= Tim Daly =

American actor (born 1956)

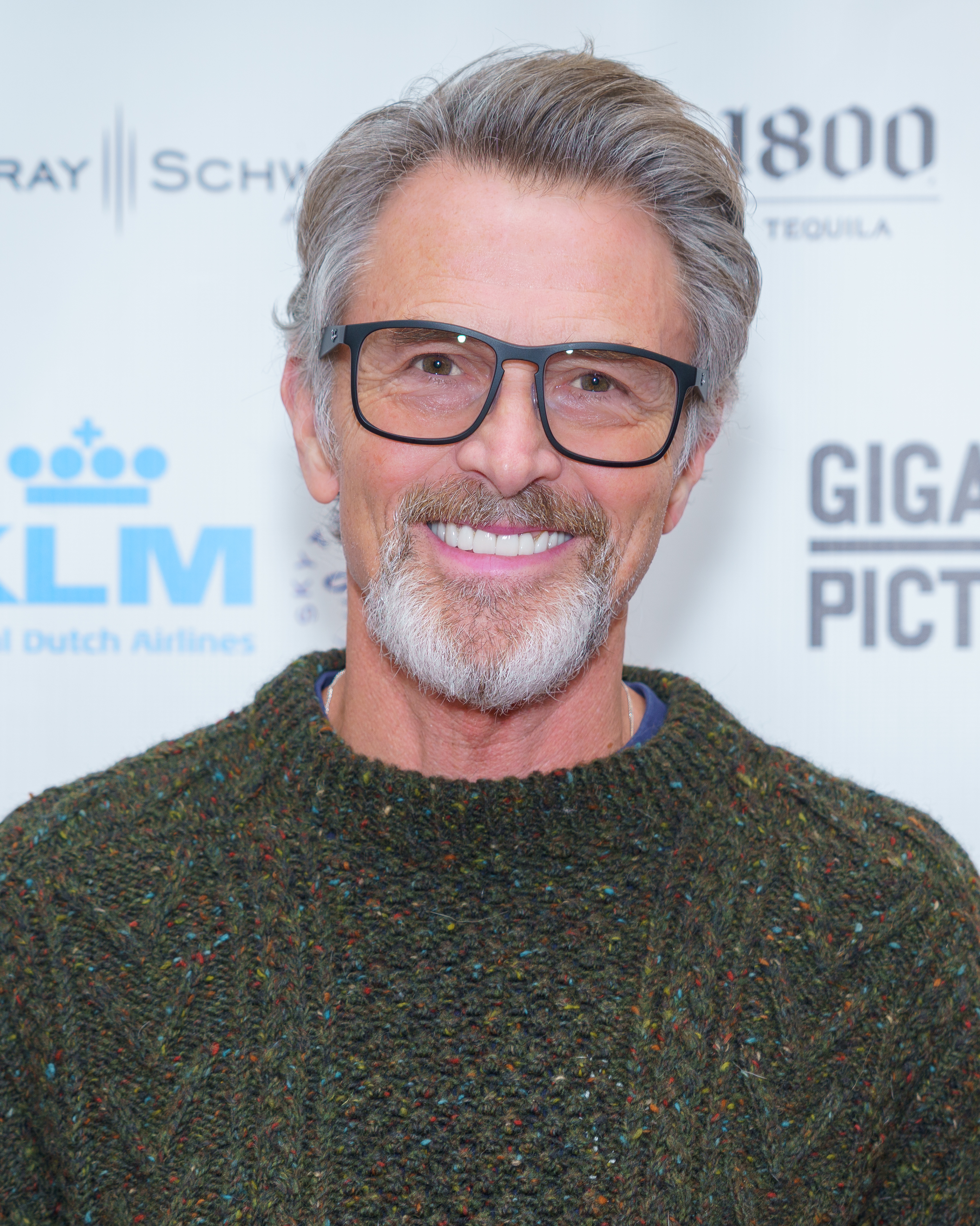
- Daly at the 2025 Woodstock Film Festival
- Born: James Timothy Daly; March 1, 1956 (age 70); New York City, U.S.
- Other name: Timothy Daly
- Education: Bennington College, B.A. 1979
- Occupations: Actor; producer; director
- Years active: 1963–present
- Spouses: Amy Van Nostrand (m. 1982; div. 2010) Téa Leoni (m. 2025)
- Children: 2, including Sam Daly
- Father: James Daly
- Relatives: Tyne Daly (sister); George Kirgo (uncle)

James Timothy Daly (born March 1, 1956) is an American actor, producer and director, best known for his roles as Joe Hackett on the NBC sitcom Wings and his recurring role as recovering alcoholic screenwriter J.T. Dolan on The Sopranos. He starred as Pete Wilder on the ABC medical drama Private Practice from 2007 to 2012. He is also known for his voice role as Clark Kent/Superman in Superman: The Animated Series and several animated Superman movies. From 2014 until 2019, he portrayed Henry McCord, husband of the Secretary of State, on the CBS political drama Madam Secretary, starring Téa Leoni, his future real-life wife.

== Early life and education ==
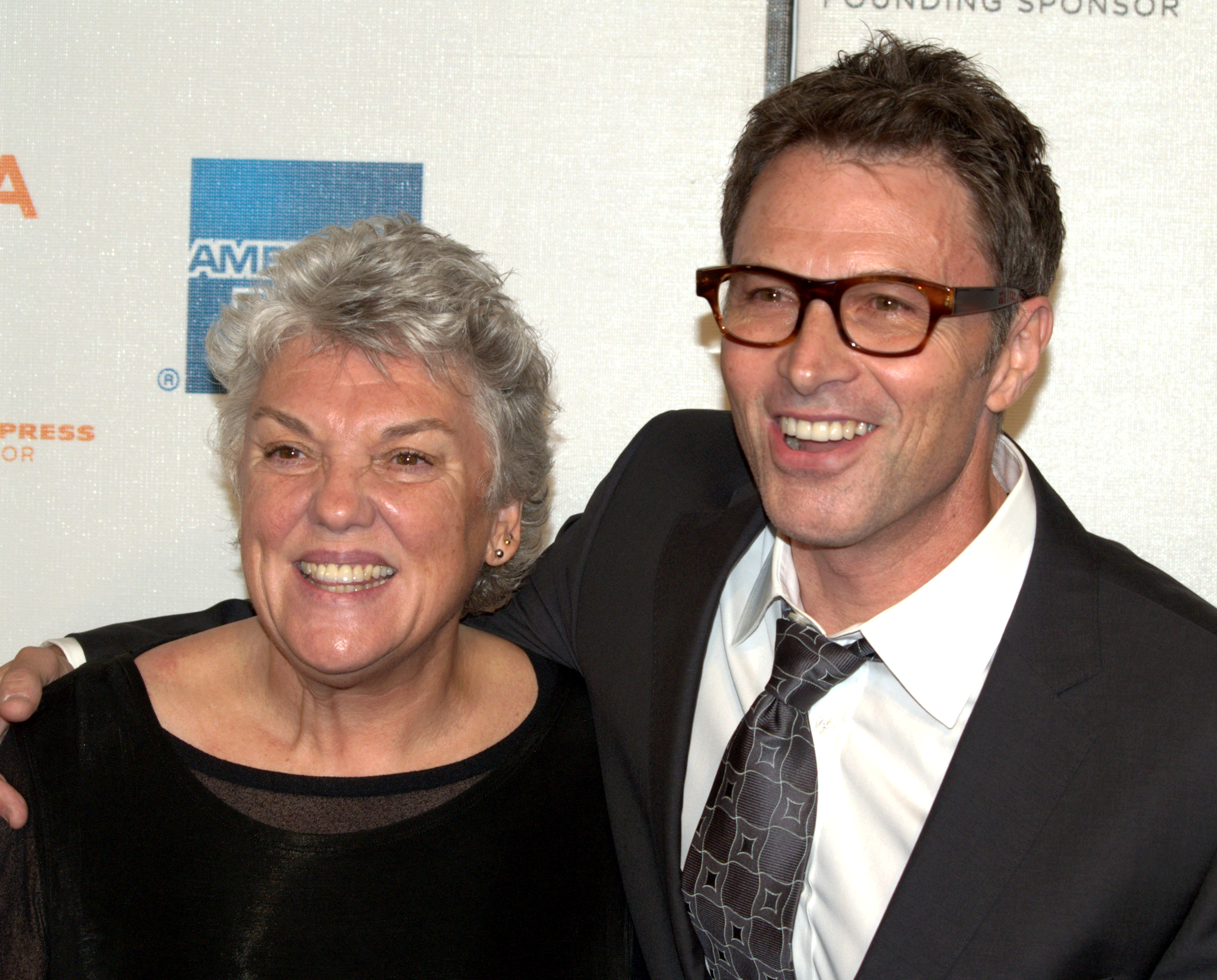
Tim Daly, with his sister Tyne

Daly was born at Mount Sinai Hospital in East Harlem, Manhattan, the only son and youngest of four children of actor James Daly (1918–1978) and actress Mary Hope Daly (née Newell; 1921–2009). He is of Irish descent, his ancestors being from Limerick and County Kerry. He is the younger brother of actress Tyne Daly. He has two other sisters, Mary Glynn (wife of Mark Snow) and Pegeen Michael. Daly attended The Putney School, where he started to study acting.

Daly began his professional career while a student at Vermont's Bennington College, where he studied Theatre and Literature, acted in summer stock, and earned a Bachelor of Arts degree. He graduated from college in 1979, and returned to New York to continue studying acting and singing.

== Career ==
Daly debuted on stage when he was seven years old in Jenny Kissed Me by Jean Kerr, together with his parents and two sisters. He appeared for the first time on TV when he was 10 years old in an American Playhouse adaptation of An Enemy of the People by Henrik Ibsen, which starred his father James Daly. He dreamed about a sports or music career and also considered becoming a doctor or a lawyer, but finally decided to become an actor. Daly started his professional acting career when he appeared in a 1978 adaptation of Peter Shaffer's play Equus.

His first leading film role was in the film Diner, directed by Barry Levinson, in which he shared screen time with actors including Kevin Bacon and Mickey Rourke. Starring roles soon followed in Alan Rudolph's feature, Made in Heaven, the American Playhouse production of The Rise & Rise of Daniel Rocket, and the CBS dramatic series, Almost Grown created by David Chase.

In theatre he has starred in the Broadway production of Coastal Disturbances by playwright Tina Howe opposite Annette Bening and received a 1987 Theatre World Award for his performance. He has also starred in Oliver, Oliver at the Manhattan Theatre Club, Mass Appeal by Bill C. Davis and Bus Stop by William Inge at Trinity Repertory Company, The Glass Menagerie by Tennessee Williams at the Santa Fe Festival Theatre, A Knife in the Heart and A Study in Scarlet at the Williamstown Playhouse, and Paris Bound at the Berkshire Theatre Festival. During this time, Daly also starred in the CBS television miniseries I'll Take Manhattan as Toby Amberville.

Daly describes himself as being highly self-critical in regard to his career. In an interview with New Zealand 'ZM' radio personality Polly Gillespie, Daly was quoted as saying, "I think part of it (his self-critical nature) is passed down to me from my parents who are actors. The theatre was our temple... When you entered you were expected to live up to the example of this glorious place."

=== 1990s ===
Wings is an American sitcom that ran on NBC from April 19, 1990, to May 14, 1997. It starred Daly and Steven Weber as brothers Joe and Brian Hackett. The show was set at Tom Nevers Field, a small airport in Nantucket, Massachusetts, where the Hackett brothers operated the one-plane airline, Sandpiper Air.

In 1993, he gave a much-respected performance as David Koresh in the TV-movie In the Line of Duty: Ambush in Waco (TV). The film became controversial because it had already started production while the Waco standoff was still taking place.

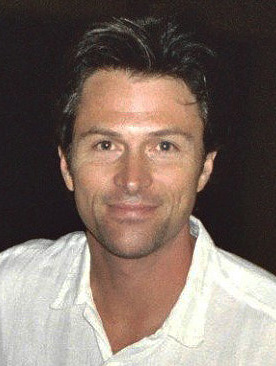
Daly in 1995

Daly also became noted for voicing Clark Kent/Superman in Superman: The Animated Series during this time.

In 1997, he and J. Todd Harris formed Daly-Harris Productions, through which he produced such films as: Execution of Justice (1999) (TV), Urbania (2000) and Tick Tock (2000). In 1998, Daly appeared in several episodes of the Emmy award-winning, Tom Hanks-produced HBO mini-series From the Earth to the Moon playing astronaut Jim Lovell. Hanks had portrayed that person in the film Apollo 13.

=== 2000s ===
During the 2000–2001 television season, Daly starred as Dr. Richard Kimble in a remake of the classic television series The Fugitive. The series lasted only one season.

In 2002, Daly guest-starred as himself in the TV series Monk in the episode "Mr. Monk and the Airplane", briefly reuniting with his Wings castmate Tony Shalhoub. In 2006, Daly returned to Broadway when he appeared on stage opposite David Schwimmer and Željko Ivanek in the Broadway revival of The Caine Mutiny Court Martial.

Daly made several appearances on The Sopranos as J.T. Dolan, an AA buddy of Christopher Moltisanti (Michael Imperioli). Daly received a 2007 Emmy nomination for his work on the series. He appeared on the midseason ABC crime series Eyes, which got good reviews but was canceled after only five episodes. In 2006, Daly played the role of Nick Cavanaugh on the new ABC drama The Nine. From 2007 to 2012, Daly played a love interest for Kate Walsh's character on the TV series Private Practice.

As a voice-actor, Daly portrayed superhero Superman and his alter ego Clark Kent in Superman: The Animated Series (1996–2000). He was unable to return as Superman (and was replaced by Christopher McDonald in Batman Beyond or as George Newbern in Justice League and Justice League Unlimited), as he was under contract to star in a remake of the 1960s TV drama The Fugitive. He reprised his role as Superman in the video game Superman: Shadow of Apokolips and the direct-to-video releases Superman: Brainiac Attacks, Superman/Batman: Public Enemies, Superman/Batman: Apocalypse and Justice League: Doom.

Daly heads Red House Entertainment. Films produced through the company include Edge of America, which won a Peabody Award and a Humanitas Prize, and Daly's directing debut, the independent film Bereft.

Daly also created Wandering Bark Productions, based at Paramount Pictures, a company designed to develop and produce a variety of film, television and theater projects. The company's producing credits include the Los Angeles premiere of Vincent J. Cardinal's play A Colorado Catechism, starring Daly. The play received favorable reviews and earned Daly the Drama-Logue Award for Best Actor. Daly co-produced a documentary, PoliWood, about the 2008 Democratic and Republican National conventions. The documentary, directed by Barry Levinson, had its premiere at the 2009 Tribeca Film Festival.

In 2014, Daly guest starred in recurring roles on The Mindy Project and Hot in Cleveland. From mid-2014 until 2019, he played Henry McCord, the husband of the title character on the TV series Madam Secretary, played by Tea Leoni, about a US Secretary of State.

== Nonprofit work ==
Daly is an activist in various liberal political and social causes.

In 2007, Daly joined The Creative Coalition (TCC), a liberal, politically active 501(c)(3) nonprofit consisting of members of the American film entertainment industry; since 2008, he has served as its president. As a member of TCC, Daly joined the National Task Force on Children's Safety, a program co-founded by TCC and Safety4Kids that calls itself "the first children's media brand focused solely on safety and health." In August 2007, Daly became one of the three chairs for TCC's activity at the 2008 Democratic and Republican conventions, along with actress Kerry Washington and writer/director Sue Kramer. In November 2007, Daly interviewed Senator John Edwards, one of the Democratic presidential candidates.

In June 2008, Daly, together with Chandra Wilson, was named the 2008 ambassador for Lee National Denim Day – a fundraiser for breast cancer benefiting the Women's Cancer Programs of the Entertainment Industry Foundation.

== Personal life ==
Daly married actress Amy Van Nostrand in 1982. They have two children. In 2010, Daly and Van Nostrand divorced. In Madam Secretary, their son Sam Daly played the ex-fiancé of White House Press Secretary Daisy Grant, and their daughter, Emelyn, played the niece of Daly's character, Henry McCord.

In 2012, Daly climbed Mount Kilimanjaro. He was in the Virgin America first-class lounge during the 2013 Los Angeles International Airport shooting.

Daly married Téa Leoni, his Madam Secretary co-star, on July 12, 2025, in New York. They had been dating since 2014.

== Filmography ==
=== Film ===
Key
†	Denotes films that have not yet been released

Year	Title	Role	Notes
1982	Diner	Billy	Credited as Timothy Daly
1984	Just the Way You Are	Frank Bantam	
1987	Made in Heaven	Tom Donnelly	
1988	Spellbinder	Jeff Mills	
1989	The More You Know	Himself	
1990	Love or Money	Chris Murdoch	
1992	Year of the Comet	Oliver Plexico	
1994	Caroline at Midnight	Detective Ray Dillon	
1995	Denise Calls Up	Frank Oliver	
1995	Dr. Jekyll and Ms. Hyde	Doctor Richard Jacks	
1996	The Associate	Frank Peterson	
1998	The Object of My Affection	Dr. Robert Joley	
1999	Seven Girlfriends	Jesse Campbell	
2003	Basic	Colonel Bill Styles	
2004	Against the Ropes	Gavin Reese	
2004	Bereft	Uncle 'Happy'	Also producer and director
2004	Return to Sender	Martin North	
2005	My Neighbor Totoro	Professor Tatsuo Kusakabe	Voice (Disney English dub)
2006	Superman: Brainiac Attacks	Clark Kent / Superman	Voice
2006	The Good Student	Ronald Gibb	
2006	Generation Boom	Himself	
2009	The Skeptic	Bryan Becket	
2009	Superman/Batman: Public Enemies	Clark Kent / Superman	Voice
2009	PoliWood	Himself	Documentary
2010	Superman/Batman: Apocalypse	Clark Kent / Superman	Voice
2010	Dilf	Jake Holt	Short film
2012	Justice League: Doom	Clark Kent / Superman	Voice
2013	Waking	Jonathan	
2013	After Darkness	Raymond Beaty Sr.	
2015	A Rising Tide	Tom Blake	
2023	Finestkind	Dennis Sykes	
2025	The Panic	William Whitney	

=== Television ===
Year	Title	Role	Notes
1966	An Enemy of the People	Morten Stockmann	Film
1981	Hill Street Blues	Dann	Episode: "Gatorbait"
1983	Ryan's Four	Dr. Edward Gillian	Episode: "Ryan's Four"
1984	I Married a Centerfold	Kevin Coates	Television film
1985	Mirrors	Chris Philips	Television film
1986	American Playhouse	Richard	Episode: "The Rise and Rise of Daniel Rocket"
1986	Alfred Hitchcock Presents	Scott	Episode: "Enough Rope for Two"
1987	I'll Take Manhattan	Toby Amberville	2 episodes
1988–1989	Almost Grown	Norman Foley	Main role
1989	Midnight Caller	Elliot Chase	Episode: "Watching Me, Watching You"
1989	Red Earth, White Earth	Guy Pehrsson	Film
1990–1997	Wings	Joe Montgomery Hackett	Main role
1993	Alex Haley's Queen	Colonel James Jackson Jr.	2 episodes
1993	In the Line of Duty: Ambush in Waco	David Koresh	Television film
1994	Dangerous Heart	Angel Perno	Television film
1994	Witness to the Execution	Dennis Casterline	Television film
1995	The John Larroquette Show	Thor Merrick	Episode: "Bad Pennies"
1996–2000	Superman: The Animated Series	Clark Kent / Superman, Bizarro	Voice, main role
1998	From the Earth to the Moon	Jim Lovell	4 episodes
1998	Invasion America	Additional Voices	Recurring role
1999	Storm of the Century	Mike Anderson	3 episodes
1999	Execution of Justice	Dan White	Film
1999	Intimate Portrait: Tyne Daly	Narrator	Film
2000	A House Divided	Charles Dubose	Film
2000–2001	The Fugitive	Dr. Richard Kimble	Main role
2002	Monk	Himself	Episode: "Mr. Monk and the Airplane"
2002	The Outsider	Johnny Gault	Television film
2003	Judging Amy	Monty Fisher	Episode: "Shock and Awe"
2003	Edge of America	Leroy McKinney	Television film
2003	Wilder Days	John Morse	Television film
2004–2007	The Sopranos	J.T. Dolan	4 episodes
2005	Eyes	Harlan Judd	Main role
2006	Commander in Chief	Cameron Manchester	Episode: "Happy Birthday, Madam President"
2006–2007	The Nine	Nick Cavanaugh	Main role
2007	Law & Order: Special Victims Unit	Reverend Jeb Curtis	Episode: "Sin"
2007	Grey's Anatomy	Dr. Peter "Pete" Wilder	2 episodes
2007–2012	Private Practice	Dr. Peter "Pete" Wilder	Main role
2013	Hawaii Five-0	Ray Harper	Episode: "A'ale Ma'a Wau"
2014	The Mindy Project	Charlie Lang	3 episodes
2014	Hot in Cleveland	Mitch	Recurring role
2014–2019	Madam Secretary	Henry McCord	Main role
2021–2023	The Game	Colonel Ulysses S. Thatcher	Recurring role
2024	Life & Beth	Mr. Pederson	Episodes: "MRI", "Shower Sex"
2025	Leanne	Andrew	Recurring role
2026	The Boys	Rick January	Episode: "King of Hell"
2026	Newlyweds	James	Main role

=== Producer credits ===
Year	Title	Notes
2000	Tick Tock	
2003	Edge of America	Executive producer, also actor
2004	Bereft	Also director and actor
2009	PoliWood	Documentary

=== Theatre ===
==== Broadway ====
Year	Production	Playwright	Role	Notes
1987–88	Coastal Disturbances	Tina Howe	Leo Hart	Circle in the Square Theatre (February 14, 1987 – January 3, 1988)
2006	The Caine Mutiny Court-Martial	Herman Wouk	prosecutor Lt. Cmdr. John Challee	Gerald Schoenfeld Theatre (May 7, 2006 – May 21, 2006)

==== Off-Broadway ====
Year	Production	Playwright	Role	Notes
1984	Fables For Friends		Trevor/Chris/Nicky/Victor/Eddie	Playwrights Horizons
1985	Oliver, Oliver	Paul Osborn	Oliver Oliver	Manhattan Theatre Club (Stage 73); City Center
1986	The Rise & Rise of Daniel Rocket	Peter Parnell	Richard	
1986–87	Coastal Disturbances	Tina Howe	Leo Hart	McGinn-Cazale Theatre (Second Stage Theatre) (from November 19, 1986 – ran for 45 performances, then transferred to Broadway)
2003	Fear of Flying at 30	Erica Jong		Manhattan Theatre Club (May 2003)
2003	The Exonerated	Jessica Blank and Erik Jensen		Theatres at 45 Bleecker/Bleecker Street Theatre
2023	The Night of the Iguana	Tennessee Williams	Rev. Shannon	Pershing Square Signature Center (Dec 2023)

==== Other stage credits ====
Year	Production	Playwright	Role	Notes
1963	Jenny Kissed Me	Jean Kerr		Bucks County Playhouse, New Hope, Pennsylvania
1978	Equus	Peter Shaffer	Alan Strang	Summer Stock (with Kevin McCarthy)
1981	The Fifth of July	Lanford Wilson		Trinity Square Repertory Company, Providence, Rhode Island
1981	Buried Child	Sam Shepard		Trinity Square Repertory Company, Providence, Rhode Island
1981	Of Mice and Men	John Steinbeck		Trinity Square Repertory Company, Providence, Rhode Island
1983	Mass Appeal	Bill C. Davis		Trinity Square Repertory Company, Providence, Rhode Island
1983	Bus Stop	William Inge		Trinity Square Repertory Company, Providence, Rhode Island
1983	The Cabaret			Williamstown Playhouse
1983	A Knife in the Heart	Susan Yankowitz	Donald Holt	Williamstown Playhouse
	A Christmas Carol	Charles Dickens/Hall and Cumming adaptation		Trinity Square Repertory Company, Providence, Rhode Island
1985	Paris Bound	Philip Barry		Berkshire Theatre Festival
	The Glass Menagerie	Tennessee Williams		Santa Fe Festival Theatre, Santa Fe, New Mexico
	The Lion in Winter	James Goldman		Windham Repertory
1987	A Study in Scarlet	Sir Arthur Conan Doyle	Jefferson Hope	Williamstown Playhouse
	Dugout			Mark Taper Forum Los Angeles
1993	The Colorado Catechism	Vincent J. Cardinal	Ty Wain	Coast Playhouse Los Angeles
	Love Letters	A. R. Gurney	Andrew Makepiece Ladd III	Canon Theater Los Angeles
2000	Ancestral Voices	A. R. Gurney		George Street Playhouse, New Brunswick, New Jersey
	Love Letters	A. R. Gurney	Andrew Makepiece Ladd III	Trinity Square Repertory Company, Providence, Rhode Island
2004	Cabaret & Main		Darius de Haas	Williamstown Playhouse
2010	Six Degrees of Separation	John Guare	Flan Kittredge	Williamstown Theatre Festival, July 14–25
2016	The Ruins of Civilization			
2017	Downstairs	Theresa Rebeck		Dorset Theatre Festival

== Awards and nominations ==
Year	Association	Category	Nominated work	Result	Ref.
1987	Theatre World Awards	Best Debut Performance in a Broadway production	Coastal Disturbances	Won	
1993	Drama-Logue Awards	Outstanding Actor	The Colorado Catechism	Won	
2000	Golden Satellite Awards	Best Actor in a Television Series Drama	The Fugitive	Won	
2001	Screen Actors Guild	Outstanding Performance by a Male Actor in a Drama Series	The Fugitive	Nominated	
2001	TV Guide Awards	Actor of the Year in a New Series	The Fugitive	Nominated	
2005	TV Land Awards	Favorite Airborne Character(s)	Wings (shared with Steven Weber)	Nominated	
2005	Peabody Awards	Peabody Award	Edge of America	Won	
2006	Daytime Emmy Awards	Outstanding Performer in a Children/Youth/Family Special	Edge of America	Nominated	
2007	Emmy Awards	Outstanding Guest Actor in a Drama Series	The Sopranos	Nominated	
2008	Vail Film Festival	Excellence in Acting Award	an annual award	Won	
