= Bye Bye Birdie =

1960 stage musical

- Original Broadway cast album
- Music: Charles Strouse
- Lyrics: Lee Adams
- Book: Michael Stewart
- Productions: 1960 Broadway; 1961 West End; 1990 U.S. tour; 2004 Encores! NYC Center; 2008 Washington DC; 2009 Broadway revival; 2024 Kennedy Center
- Awards: Tony Award for Best Musical

Bye Bye Birdie is a stage musical with music by Charles Strouse and lyrics by Lee Adams, with a book by Michael Stewart.

Originally titled Let's Go Steady, it is set in 1958. The play's book was influenced by Elvis Presley being drafted into the US Army in 1957. The rock star character's name, "Conrad Birdie", is word play on the name of Conway Twitty. Twitty later had a long career as a country music star but, in the late 1950s, he was one of Presley's rock 'n' roll rivals.

The original 1960–61 Broadway production was a Tony Award–winning success. It spawned a London production and several major revivals, a sequel, a 1963 film, and a 1995 television production. The show also became a popular choice for high school and college productions due to its variable cast size and large proportion of ensemble numbers.

== History ==
Producer Edward Padula had the idea for a musical initially titled Let's Go Steady, a "happy teenage musical with a difference". Padula contracted with two writers and Charles Strouse and Lee Adams wrote seven songs for their libretto. Padula, Strouse, and Adams sought Gower Champion as director/choreographer, who until that time had choreographed only a few musicals. (Fred Astaire and Morton DaCosta had already declined.) However, Champion did not like the book, and the writers were fired. Michael Stewart then took their place. Stewart's first draft, Love and Kisses, focused on a couple thinking of divorce whose children persuade them to stay together, a theme soon taken up by the Disney film The Parent Trap.

Champion wanted "something more". The 'something more' had been right there in the newspaper. Rock-and-roll idol Elvis Presley was drafted into the Army on 20 December 1957, and in September 1958 left the US for eighteen months in Germany, provoking a media circus that included Presley's giving a specially-selected member of the Women's Army Corps "one last kiss". After brainstorming, Stewart and Adams "came up with the idea of a rock-and-roll singer going off to the Army and its effect on a group of teenagers in a small town in Ohio. The name of the singer initially was 'Ellsworth', which was soon changed to 'Conway Twitty' before we discovered there was already a Conway Twitty who was threatening to sue us, and then, finally, 'Conrad Birdie'".

== Synopsis ==
=== Act one ===
New York–based songwriter Albert Peterson finds himself in trouble when his client, hip-thrusting rock and roll superstar and teen idol Conrad Birdie, is drafted into the Army, leaving his heavily indebted firm Al-Mae-Lou Music (a spoof of the real-life Aldon Music) in jeopardy. Albert's secretary, Rose "Rosie" Alvarez, comes up with a last-ditch publicity stunt to have Birdie record and perform a song before he is sent overseas. Having been stuck in a sort of romantic limbo for eight years, she longs for the Albert she once knew, an aspiring English teacher, before he wrote Birdie's first hit and abandoned those plans to pursue the seedier music industry ("An English Teacher"). Rose's plan is to have Birdie sing "One Last Kiss" (a song she assigns Albert to write on the spot) and give one lucky girl, chosen randomly from his fan club, a real "last kiss" on The Ed Sullivan Show before going into the Army.

In Sweet Apple, Ohio, all the teenagers are catching up on the latest gossip about 15-year-old Kim MacAfee and Hugo Peabody going steady ("The Telephone Hour"). Kim reflects on how happy she is with her maturity, believing at 15 she has fully reached adulthood ("How Lovely to Be a Woman"). She quits the Conrad Birdie fan club over the phone because of the new milestone happening in her life. Her best friend Ursula is shocked. Kim reconsiders when, after a lengthy phone conversation with Ursula, she receives the phone call telling her that she has been chosen to be Birdie's last kiss before going into the armed forces.

Meanwhile, Conrad, Albert and Rosie prepare to go to Sweet Apple. A crowd of teenage girls sees them off at the New York City train station, although one girl is sad because she thinks that by the time Conrad gets out of the army, she will be too old for him. Albert advises her to be optimistic ("Put On a Happy Face"). Soon, tabloid reporters arrive with questions about the seedy details of Conrad's personal life, but Rosie, Albert and the girls answer for him, hoping to protect his reputation and bankability ("Normal American Boy").

Conrad receives a hero's welcome in Sweet Apple, and Hugo worries that Kim likes Conrad more than she likes him, but Kim assures Hugo that he is the only one she loves ("One Boy"). Conrad shocks the town's parents and drives the teenage girls crazy with his performance of "Honestly Sincere", which causes all of the girls (including Edna, the mayor's wife) to faint. Conrad becomes a guest in the MacAfee house and irritates Kim's father, Harry, by being rude and selfish. Harry does not want Kim to kiss Conrad, until Albert tells him their whole family will be on The Ed Sullivan Show. Kim, Harry, Kim's mother Doris, and younger brother Randolph sing Sullivan's praises ("Hymn for a Sunday Evening").

Albert's overbearing mother, Mae, comes to Sweet Apple to break up her son's relationship with Rosie (she objects to Rosie's Hispanic heritage). She introduces Albert to Gloria Rasputin, a curvy blonde she met on the bus who could replace Rosie as his secretary. Gloria, a tap dancer, secretly hopes that a connection with Albert could be her way into show business. Mae sings "Swanee River" as Gloria tap-dances (usually depicted as her making a fool of herself). Albert gives Gloria a typing job. Rosie is furious, and fantasizes about violent ways to murder Albert ("One Hundred Ways Ballet"), but instead comes up with a better idea: she convinces Hugo to sabotage the last kiss.

Since both Rosie and Hugo are jealous and angry, they plot to ruin Conrad's appearance on The Ed Sullivan Show. On the broadcast, Conrad sings "One Last Kiss", and as he leans in to kiss Kim, Hugo runs onstage and punches him in the face, knocking Conrad unconscious. Rosie dumps Albert who, trying to cover for the mishaps of the evening, then leads a chorus of "Normal American Boy".

=== Act two ===
Despite plans to re-film the broadcast, Rosie and Kim resolve to leave Albert and Hugo, lamenting their stupidity for having fallen in love ("What Did I Ever See in Him?"). Conrad, with no visible effects from being knocked out, decides he wants to go out and have a good time on his last night as a civilian, and encourages the Sweet Apple teens to party ("A Lot of Livin' to Do"). Kim sneaks out of her house and joins her friends. Conrad, Kim, and all the teenagers, except Hugo, head for the Ice House, "where people go when they want to be alone." Hugo goes to Maude's Roadside Retreat, the town bar, hoping to get drunk, but grumpy proprietor Charles F. Maude sees that he's underage and refuses to serve him.

When Harry discovers Kim has run away, he and Doris lament how disobedient kids are these days ("Kids"). Rosie ends up at Maude's Roadside Retreat and starts flirting with other men, but Albert phones her and begs her to return to him ("Baby, Talk to Me"). Rosie interrupts a Shriners meeting in Maude's private dining room. She flirts with all the Shriners, and they begin a wild dance. Hugo and Albert rescue Rosie from the crazed Shriners, and Albert finally stands up to his mother, telling her to go home. Mae leaves, but not before lamenting the sacrifices she made for him ("A Mother Doesn't Matter Anymore"). Hugo tells the MacAfees and the other parents that the teenagers have gone to the Ice House, and they all declare that they do not know what's wrong with their kids ("Kids Reprise"). Randolph joins in, stating that his older sister and the other teens are "so ridiculous and so immature".

The adults and the police arrive at the Ice House and arrest Conrad for attempted statutory rape. Kim, who unconvincingly claimed to be in her late 20s to Conrad, claims she was intimidated and gladly returns to Hugo. After a reconciliation with Albert, Rosie tells Mae that she will marry Albert despite Mae's racist objections, and despite being a natural-born American citizen from Allentown, Pennsylvania, she will deliberately play up her Hispanic heritage if it annoys Mae that much ("Spanish Rose"). Albert bails Conrad out of jail and arranges for him to sneak out of town dressed as a middle-aged woman, presumably so he can report for Army induction as scheduled; in turn, Conrad offers Albert a lifetime contract for bailing him out. Albert gets Mae to leave Sweet Apple on the same train, getting his mother and Conrad out of his life for good. Albert tells Rosie they're not going back to New York; they're going to Pumpkin Falls, Iowa, a small town in need of a (married) English teacher. Albert professes that everything is rosy with Rosie ("Rosie"), and they go off together happily engaged.

== Characters ==
- Albert Peterson: The central character of the story, a poet and former aspiring English teacher who was lured into the music business after penning a hit for Conrad Birdie. Peterson is neurotic, weak and easily manipulated by his mother.
- Rose "Rosie" Alvarez: Albert's secretary and long-suffering significant other, loathed by Albert's mother
- Kim MacAfee: A precocious teenage girl from Sweet Apple, outgoing president of the Conrad Birdie Fan Club who is on the cusp of giving up her fandom when she is chosen to receive her kiss from Conrad Birdie
- Conrad Birdie: A rock and roll superstar with an implied checkered past and an unpredictable personality who is drafted into the Armed Forces
- Randolph MacAfee: Kim's younger brother, who idolizes his father
- Harry MacAfee: Kim and Randolph's befuddled and bad-tempered father, a World War II veteran and strong conservative utterly dismayed at the Baby Boomer generation
- Doris MacAfee: Kim and Randolph's mother
- Mae Peterson: Albert's manipulative, racist widowed mother
- Hugo Peabody: Kim's strait-laced boyfriend
- Ursula Merkle: Kim's hyperactive best friend and next-door neighbor, a Conrad Birdie enthusiast
- Gloria Rasputin: A curvaceous tap dancer who hopes to be Albert's new secretary, whom Mae brings to Albert, hoping he will choose her over Rosie
- Helen, Alice, Deborah Sue, Nancy, Penelope, Suzie, Margie: Sweet Apple teenage girls who are friends of Kim's, and Conrad Birdie enthusiasts; they perform solos in "Telephone Hour".
- Harvey Johnson: A nerdy teenage boy who performs a few parts in "Telephone Hour"
- Fred/Freddie, Carl/Karl and Roger: Sweet Apple teenage boys. Featured in "Telephone Hour"
- Charles Maude: Owner of Maude's Roadside Retreat, second tenor in male quartet, and member of the adult ensemble
- Mrs. Merkle: Ursula's mother
- Mr. Johnson: Harvey's father
- The Mayor: The mayor of Sweet Apple
- The Mayor's Wife (Edna): The repressed wife of the mayor; she comedically faints multiple times during Conrad Birdie's performance of "Honestly Sincere".
- Dishwasher/Bar Patrons: Three members of the quartet, with Maude; they perform solos in "Baby, Talk to Me".
- Reporters
- Policemen
- Ed Sullivan: The host of the Ed Sullivan Show (unseen character onstage; appears in 1963 film)

== Characters and original cast ==
Character	Broadway (1960)	West End (1961)	U.S. Tour (1990)	Encores! (2004)	Kennedy Center Concert (2008)	Broadway (2009)	Kennedy Center (2024)
Albert Peterson	Dick Van Dyke	Peter Marshall	Tommy Tune	Daniel Jenkins	Brooks Ashmanskas	John Stamos	Christian Borle
Rose Alvarez	Chita Rivera	Chita Rivera	Ann Reinking	Karen Ziemba	Leslie Kritzer	Gina Gershon	Krysta Rodriguez
Kim MacAfee	Susan Watson	Sylvia Tysick	Susan Egan	Jessica Grové	Laura Osnes	Allie Trimm	Ashlyn Maddox
Conrad Birdie	Dick Gautier	Marty Wilde	Marc Kudisch	William Robert Gaynor	James Snyder	Nolan Gerard Funk	Ephraim Sykes
Randolph MacAfee	Johnny Borden	Kenneth Nash	Joey Hannon	William Ullrich	N/A	Jake Evan Schwencke	Henry Kirk
Harry MacAfee	Paul Lynde	Robert Nichols	Dale O'Brien	Walter Bobbie	Ned Eisenberg	Bill Irwin	Richard Kind
Doris MacAfee	Marijane Maricle	Mary Laura Wood	Belle Calaway	Victoria Clark	Lisa Brescia	Dee Hoty	Jennifer Laura Thompson
Mae Peterson	Kay Medford	Angela Baddeley	Marilyn Cooper	Doris Roberts	Randy Graff	Jayne Houdyshell	Caroline Aaron
Hugo Peabody	Michael J. Pollard	Clive Endersby	Steve Zahn	Keith Nobbs	Bobby Steggert	Matt Doyle	Miguel Gil
Ursula Merkle	Barbara Doherty	Elaine Millar	Jessica Stone	Emma Zaks	N/A	Brynn Williams	Jackera Davis
Gloria Rasputin	Norma Richardson	Christine Child	Belle Calaway	Rachelle Rak	N/A	Paula Leggett Chase	Megan Sikora

== Musical numbers ==
=== Original Broadway Production ===
Act I

- Overture – Orchestra
- "An English Teacher" – Rosie
- "The Telephone Hour" – Teenagers
- "How Lovely to Be a Woman" – Kim
- "Penn Station Transition"/"We Love You, Conrad!" – Orchestra/Teen Trio
- "Put On a Happy Face" – Albert
- "A Normal, American Boy" – Albert, Rosie, Reporters, Ensemble
- "One Boy" – Kim, Deborah Sue, Alice
- "One Boy" (Reprise) – Rosie
- "Honestly Sincere" – Conrad and Company
- "Wounded" – Ursula, Deborah Sue, and Margie
- "Hymn for a Sunday Evening" – The MacAfee Family & Company
- "How to Kill a Man" (Ballet) – Rosie, Albert, Company
- "One Last Kiss" – Conrad & Company
- "A Normal, American Boy" (Reprise, Act One Finale) – Albert and The Company

Act II

- Entr'acte
- "What Did I Ever See in Him?" – Rosie & Kim
- "What Did I Ever See in Him?" (Reprise) – Rosie
- "A Lot of Livin' to Do" – Conrad, Kim and Teenagers
- "Kids" – Mr. and Mrs. MacAfee
- "Baby, Talk to Me" – Albert and Bar Patrons
- "Shriner's Ballet" (dance) – Rosie & Shriners
- "Kids" (Reprise) – Randolph, Mr. MacAfee, Mrs. MacAfee, and Company
- "Lot of Livin'" (Reprise) – Teenagers
- "Spanish Rose" – Rosie
- "Rosie" – Albert & Rosie

=== 2009 Broadway Revival ===
Act I

- "Overture: We Love You Conrad" – The Fan Club Girls & Orchestra
- "An English Teacher" – Rosie
- "The Telephone Hour" – Teenagers
- "How Lovely to Be a Woman" – Kim
- "Put On a Happy Face" – Albert & The Fan Club Girls
- "A Normal, American Boy" – Albert, Rosie, Reporters, The Fan Club Girls
- "One Boy" – Kim, Hugo, Helen, Alice, Rosie
- "Honestly Sincere" – Conrad
- "Hymn for a Sunday Evening" – The MacAfee Family
- "One Last Kiss" – Conrad, The MacAfee Family, TV Quartet, Company

Act II

- Entr'acte
- "What Did I Ever See in Him?" – Rosie & Kim
- "Kids” – Mr. MacAfee, Mrs. MacAfee, Randolph MacAfee
- "A Lot of Livin’ To Do" – Conrad, Kim, Teenagers
- "Baby, Talk to Me" – Albert and Men’s Quartet
- "Spanish Rose" – Rosie
- "Rosie" – Albert & Rosie
- "Finale: Bye Bye Birdie" – Company

== Productions ==
=== Original productions ===
In New York, the Broadway production opened on April 14, 1960, at the Martin Beck Theatre, transferring to the 54th Street Theatre and then the Shubert Theatre, closing on October 7, 1961 after 607 performances. The show was produced by Edward Padula and directed and choreographed by Gower Champion, with orchestrations by Robert Ginzler, scenic design by Robert Randolph, costumes by Miles White and lighting by Peggy Clark.

The original Broadway cast included Dick Van Dyke, Chita Rivera, Paul Lynde, Dick Gautier, Susan Watson, Kay Medford, Charles Nelson Reilly, and Michael J. Pollard. Reilly understudied as Albert Peterson for Van Dyke, who periodically took time off (including a two-week hiatus to film the pilot episode of The Dick Van Dyke Show) and returned to the leading role. During pre-production, Chita Rivera took the role of Rosie after both Carol Haney and Eydie Gormé turned it down, and the character's last name was changed from "Grant" to "Alvarez". Replacements during the run included Gene Rayburn as Albert and Gretchen Wyler as Rosie, both of whom joined the cast on April 9, 1961.

The musical played in July 1961 at the Los Angeles Philharmonic Auditorium as part of the 1961 season of the Los Angeles Civic Light Opera. After a two-and-a-half-week pre-run tryout at the Manchester Opera House, the show opened in London's West End at Her Majesty's Theatre in June 1961, with Peter Marshall as Albert, Rivera reprising her role as Rosie, Angela Baddeley as Mae and Marty Wilde as Conrad Birdie. That production ran for 268 performances.

=== 1990 US tour ===
A U.S. tour from mid-1990 through June 1991 starred Tommy Tune as Albert, Ann Reinking as Rosie, Marc Kudisch as Conrad, Marcia Lewis as Mrs. Peterson, Steve Zahn as Hugo, and Susan Egan as Kim.

=== 2004 Encores! concert ===
The New York City Center Encores! staged concert production ran in May 2004, with Karen Ziemba as Rosie, Daniel Jenkins as Albert, Jessica Grové as Kim, and Bob Gaynor as Conrad.

=== Kennedy Center productions ===
An abridged version of Bye Bye Birdie was presented at the Kennedy Center in Washington, DC, October 2–5, 2008, as part of its Broadway: Three Generations production. Laura Osnes played Kim and Leslie Kritzer played Rosie.

From June 7–15, 2024, a new production was produced at the Kennedy Center, directed by Marc Bruni, and starring Christian Borle as Albert, Krysta Rodriguez as Rosie, Ephraim Sykes as Conrad, and Richard Kind as Harry MacAfee.

=== 2009 Broadway revival ===
The Roundabout Theatre Company's limited-run Broadway revival began previews at Henry Miller's Theatre on September 10, 2009, opened to unanimously negative reviews on October 15, and was scheduled to close January 10, 2010 before it was extended until April 25. Due to poor advance sales after the departures of John Stamos and Gina Gershon's contracts, the closing date was moved up by three months to January 24. Robert Longbottom was the director-choreographer, with Stamos and Gershon starring as Albert and Rosie, Bill Irwin as Harry MacAfee, Jayne Houdyshell as Mrs. Mae Peterson, Nolan Gerard Funk as Conrad, Allie Trimm as Kim MacAfee and Matt Doyle as Hugo Peabody.

Although Longbottom spoke extensively about how the show was being revised and refined for the revival, there were no interpolations from the film or TV adaptations of the show barring the title tune written for the film, which was used as a finale.

== Film and television adaptations ==
=== 1963 film ===
Bye Bye Birdie was first adapted for film in 1963. It starred Dick Van Dyke reprising his stage role as a slightly rewritten Albert Peterson, Maureen Stapleton as Mae Peterson, Janet Leigh as Rosie, Paul Lynde reprising his stage role as Mr. MacAfee, Bobby Rydell as Hugo Peabody, and Ann-Margret as Kim MacAfee. Jesse Pearson played Conrad Birdie. Ed Sullivan makes a guest appearance as himself. The film is credited with making Ann-Margret a superstar during the mid-1960s, leading to her appearing with the real Elvis Presley in Viva Las Vegas (1964). The film ranked number 38 on Entertainment Weekly's list of the 50 Best High School Movies.

Several significant changes were made in the plot and character relationships in the film version. Albert is not Birdie's agent but a talented research chemist who is struggling as a songwriter only to please his mother, who is overbearing and insensitive, but not racist as in the musical. He contributed to Birdie's initial success, and therefore Birdie "owes" him a favor. The film version includes an additional character, a suave English teacher who flirts with Rosie. She plays up to him in several scenes after Albert has made her angry by caving in to his mother. The positioning and context of several songs were changed as well. "An English Teacher", "Normal American Boy", "One Hundred Ways", "What Did I Ever See in Him?", "Baby, Talk to Me", and "Spanish Rose" were omitted from the film. "Kids" was performed in the MacAfee kitchen by Mr. MacAfee, Mama Mae Peterson, Albert, and Randolph. "Put On a Happy Face" was performed by Albert and Rosie in the MacAfees' back yard; "A Lot of Livin' to Do" was performed by Conrad, Kim, and Hugo at a teen dance; and "Rosie" was sung at the end of show by Albert, Rosie, Hugo, and Kim. Kim also opens and closes the film version singing the title song, "Bye Bye, Birdie", a song written for the film. The film version ends on a brighter and lighter note than the stage musical. Conrad is not arrested, but Hugo knocks him out with a single punch "live" on The Ed Sullivan Show and wins Kim's heart. Thus, there is no necessity for Albert to bail Conrad out of jail and arrange for him to sneak out of town dressed as a middle-aged woman, presumably so he can report for Army induction as scheduled. There is also no need for Conrad to offer Albert a lifetime contract for bailing him out. Albert's mother shows up after the broadcast with Charles F. Maude (the bartender), informs Albert and Rosie that she has married him, and gives Albert and Rosie her blessing for their long-postponed wedding.

Van Dyke and other members of the Broadway production were unhappy with the film adaptation due to the focus shift to Kim. Van Dyke stated that Birdie was "a romp'" on Broadway, but they "Hollywood-ized" the movie. "They made it a vehicle for Ann-Margret." Paul Lynde, who played Mr. MacAfee on stage and in the film, later quipped "They should have retitled it 'Hello, Ann-Margret!' They cut several of my and the other actors' best scenes and shot new ones for her so she could do her teenage-sex-bombshell act." Susan Watson, who created the role of Kim on Broadway, later said, "Anyone who likes the film didn't see the show." In January 2009, Adam Shankman signed on to develop and produce a remake.

=== 1995 TV movie ===
A TV-movie adaptation was produced for ABC in 1995 by RHI Entertainment. It starred Jason Alexander in the role of Albert and Vanessa Williams as Rosie. Tyne Daly played Mae Peterson. Marc Kudisch, who played Conrad Birdie on tour opposite Tommy Tune, reprised the role. Chynna Phillips played Kim MacAfee, Sally Mayes played Mrs. MacAfee and George Wendt played Harry MacAfee. While this version remained mostly faithful to the original musical (Michael Stewart remains the only credited author of this version), several songs were added and re-arranged, and dialogue was slightly rewritten to smoothly facilitate the musical changes. The title song "Bye Bye, Birdie", written for the 1963 film and sung by Ann-Margret, was re-arranged and rewritten as a quintet for Ursula and the Sweet Apple Birdie fan club girls at the soda shop. The verse of "One Boy" that Rosie sings was replaced with "Let's Settle Down". The reference to Sammy Kaye in "Kids" was cut. The "How to Kill a Man" ballet was cut. "What Did I Ever See in Him?" was given a reprise sung by Albert, called "What Did I Ever See in Her?". The song "Baby, Talk to Me" returned to the show. "Spanish Rose" was moved to earlier in the story. "A Mother Doesn't Matter Anymore", sung by Mae Peterson was written for this version using some of the monologue it replaces. Albert tells Rosie how he has finally broken free of his overbearing mother in "A Giant Step". This song was written for the 1990 US tour.

=== Bye Bye Birdie Live! ===
On October 27, 2016, NBC announced that Jennifer Lopez would star in NBC's Bye Bye Birdie Live as Rose "Rosie" Alvarez and executive produce with her producing partners Elaine Goldsmith-Thomas and Benny Medina alongside film, TV, and live musical executive producers Craig Zadan and Neil Meron. The live television musical was initially announced to premiere in December 2017, but on May 25, 2017, it was announced that it would be pushed to sometime in 2018 to accommodate Lopez's busy schedule. On March 2, 2018, it was announced that the production had been pushed back once again, this time to 2019 at the earliest due to Lopez's busy schedule and the producers focusing on Jesus Christ Superstar Live in Concert.

NBC had in May 2018 announced plans to broadcast a live production of Hair but canceled those plans in the wake of the failure of Fox's Rent: Live in early 2019, as well as being up against the series finale of Game of Thrones and the season finale of American Idol. NBC said it intends to replace it with a more family-friendly musical and noted that if Lopez's cooperation could be secured, Bye Bye Birdie could replace Hair.

However due to the COVID-19 pandemic, Bye Bye Birdie Live got cancelled indefinitely and was replaced by Dr. Seuss' The Grinch Musical Live!

== 1981 Broadway sequel ==
In 1981, there was a short-lived Broadway sequel, Bring Back Birdie, starring Donald O'Connor and returning original cast member Chita Rivera. It closed after 31 previews and four performances.

== Critical reception ==
The original production of Bye Bye Birdie opened to mostly positive reviews, with several critics marveling at the unexpected success of a musical crafted by an inexperienced production team. John Champman of the New York Daily News called it "the funniest, most captivating, and most expert musical comedy one could hope to see ... the show is pure, plain musical comedy, with jokes, dancing, oddball costumes ... exceptionally catching orchestrations ... and a completely enthusiastic cast." He noted that "one of the best things about it is that practically nobody is connected to it. Who ever heard of Edward Padula ... Charles Strouse and Lee Adams ... Gower Champion?"

Frank Aston of the New York World-Telegram & Sun declared Bye Bye Birdie "the peak of the season" and especially liked Chita Rivera as Rosie: "Chita Rivera ... is triumphant as dancer, comic, and warbler." In the New York Daily Mirror, Robert Coleman wrote that "Edward Padula put over a sleeper in the Broadway sweepstakes, and it's going to pay off in big figures ... Rivera explodes like a bomb over West 45th Street. Michael Stewart has penned a sassy and fresh book, while Lee Adams and Charles Strouse have matched it with tongue-in-cheek lyrics and music."

Richard Watts Jr. in the New York Post wrote that while he had been "skeptical about the possibilities ... I am happy to say that I was wrong in questioning the creative powers of imagination, freshness and talent." He particularly praised Dick Gautier, whose portrayal of Conrad Birdie "is little short of perfection."

New York Herald Tribune critic Walter Kerr praised Gower Champion's direction but criticized the libretto and score, stating that "Mr. Champion has been very much responsible for the gayety, [sic] the winsomeness, and the exuberant zing of the occasion ... he has not always been given the very best to work with ... every once in a while, Michael Stewart's book starts to break down and cry ... Lee Adams's lyrics lean rather heavily on the new "talk-out-the-plot" technique, and Charles Strouse's tunes, though jaunty, are whisper-thin." Brooks Atkinson of The New York Times conceded that "the audience was beside itself with pleasure" but dryly stated that "this department was able to contain itself. Bye Bye Birdie is neither fish, fowl, nor good musical comedy. It needs work."

== Awards and nominations ==
=== Original Broadway production ===
Year	Award	Category	Nominee	Result
1961	Tony Award	Best Musical		Won
1961	Tony Award	Best Featured Actor in a Musical	Dick Van Dyke	Won
1961	Tony Award	Best Featured Actor in a Musical	Dick Gautier	Nominated
1961	Tony Award	Best Featured Actress in a Musical	Chita Rivera	Nominated
1961	Tony Award	Best Direction of a Musical	Gower Champion	Won
1961	Tony Award	Best Choreography	Gower Champion	Won
1961	Tony Award	Best Conductor and Musical Director	Elliot Lawrence	Nominated
1961	Tony Award	Best Scenic Design	Robert Randolph	Nominated

== Cast and other recordings ==
- The Original Broadway Cast recording was released by Columbia Masterworks (1960).
- The Original London Cast recording was released by Decca Records (1961).
- Bye Bye Birdie: All the Great Songs Recorded by Bobby Rydell was released by Cameo Records (1962).
- Studio Cast Recording featuring James Darren, Shelley Fabares, Paul Petersen and The Marcels was released by Colpix Records (1963).
- The film soundtrack featured Dick Van Dyke, Janet Leigh, Ann-Margret, Bobby Rydell, Paul Lynde and Jessee Pearson, released by RCA Victor (1964).
- The television soundtrack was released by RCA Records (1995) featuring Vanessa L. Williams, Jason Alexander and Marc Kudisch.
