= Bye Bye Birdie (1963 film) =

American musical romantic comedy film by George Sidney

- Theatrical release poster
- Directed by: George Sidney
- Screenplay by: Irving Brecher
- Based on: Bye Bye Birdie by Michael Stewart
- Produced by: Fred Kohlmar; George Sidney
- Starring: Janet Leigh; Dick Van Dyke; Ann-Margret; Maureen Stapleton; Bobby Rydell; Jesse Pearson; Ed Sullivan
- Cinematography: Joseph Biroc
- Edited by: Charles Nelson
- Music by: Johnny Green
- Production company: The Kohlmar-Sidney Company
- Distributed by: Columbia Pictures
- Release date: April 4, 1963 (New York)
- Running time: 112 minutes
- Country: United States
- Language: English
- Budget: $5 million
- Box office: $13.1 million

Bye Bye Birdie is a 1963 American musical romantic comedy film directed by George Sidney from a screenplay by Irving Brecher, based on Michael Stewart's book of the 1960 musical of the same name. It also features songs by composer Charles Strouse and lyricist Lee Adams and a score by Johnny Green. Produced by Fred Kohlmar, the film stars Janet Leigh, Dick Van Dyke, Ann-Margret, Maureen Stapleton, Paul Lynde, Bobby Rydell, Jesse Pearson and Ed Sullivan. Van Dyke and Lynde reprised their roles from the original Broadway production.

The story was inspired by Elvis Presley's enlistment into the U.S. Army in 1958. Pearson plays the role of teen idol Conrad Birdie, a name that is a based on that of country singer Conway Twitty.

The film is Van Dyke's feature-film debut and helped make Ann-Margret a superstar during the mid-1960s. Her performance earned a Golden Globe nomination for Best Actress and her next role was with Presley in Viva Las Vegas.

In 2006, the film was ranked number 38 on Entertainment Weekly's list of the 50 Best High School Movies.

== Plot ==
Popular rock and roll superstar Conrad Birdie receives an Army draft notice, devastating his teenage fans nationwide. Despite his doctorate in biochemistry, unsuccessful songwriter Albert Peterson schemes with his secretary and long-suffering girlfriend Rosie DeLeon to have Conrad sing a song that Albert will write. Rosie convinces Ed Sullivan to have Conrad perform Albert's song "One Last Kiss" on The Ed Sullivan Show and then kiss a randomly chosen high-school girl goodbye before joining the Army. After this succeeds, Albert will feel free to marry Rosie, despite his widowed, meddlesome mother Mae's long history of interfering with his life.

The town of Sweet Apple, Ohio is chosen as the location for Conrad's farewell performance. The random lucky girl chosen, Kim MacAfee, is thrilled, but her high-school sweetheart Hugo Peabody is jealous. Over the telephone, the teenagers of the town discuss the latest gossip: Kim and Hugo have just gotten pinned.

Upon Conrad's arrival, the teenage girls sing their anthem, "We Love You Conrad", while the boys reply with a song of hate. Sweet Apple becomes very popular, but some townspeople are unhappy with the sudden celebrity, especially after Conrad's song "Honestly Sincere" and his hip-thrusting moves cause every woman, including the mayor's wife, to faint. Pressured by the town's leading citizens, Kim's father Harry declines to allow her to kiss Conrad on television, but Albert placates him by promising that he can appear on Sullivan's show. Albert reveals to Harry that he is actually a biochemist who has developed a miracle supplement that can revolutionize farming,

Hugo feels threatened by Conrad, but Kim reassures him that she only loves him. Rosie feels unappreciated by Albert, and his mother Mae appears, distressed to find him with Rosie. Harry is also agitated about Conrad's monopoly of his house and Kim's behavioral changes. During a rehearsal for the broadcast, Conrad kisses Kim, who swoons. Hugo is hurt and Kim dumps him.

After being informed that a Russian ballet troupe has switched to a different dance requiring extra time, therefore eliminating Conrad's song and farewell kiss to Kim, Albert unsuccessfully attempts to convince the ballet's manager to shorten its performance. Albert dejectedly drowns his sorrows at a bar, where he finds Mae playing canasta with the owner Mr. Maude, also a widower. Rosie, exasperated with Albert and his mother, goes to a room where a Shriners convention is taking place. She starts dancing and flirting with the men, but when the scene becomes too wild, Albert rescues her from the crazed Shriners.

The next day, Rosie devises a plan to reinstate Conrad's spot on The Ed Sullivan Show that evening. She slips one of Albert's miracle pills into the orchestra conductor's milk, which speeds the ballet, amusing the audience, offending the Russians and placing Conrad back on the show to sing "One Last Kiss". However, just as Conrad is about to kiss Kim, Hugo runs onto the stage and punches Conrad, shocking Albert and Rosie.

Kim and Hugo reunite. Albert is free to marry Rosie and his mother reveals her own marriage to Mr. Maude.

== Cast ==
- Janet Leigh as Rosie DeLeon
- Dick Van Dyke as Albert Peterson
- Ann-Margret as Kim MacAfee
- Maureen Stapleton as Mae Peterson
- Bobby Rydell as Hugo Peabody
- Jesse Pearson as Conrad Birdie
- Ed Sullivan as himself
- Paul Lynde as Harry MacAfee
- Mary LaRoche as Doris MacAfee
- Michael Evans as Claude Paisley
- Frank Albertson as the Mayor
- Robert Paige as Bob Precht
- Gregory Morton as Maestro Borov
- Bryan Russell as Randolph MacAfee
- Milton Frome as Mr. Maude
- Trudi Ames as Ursula
- Lorene Yarnell as Hugo's dance partner (uncredited)

Two CBS personalities have cameo roles as themselves: newsman and game-show host John Daly and The Ed Sullivan Show orchestra leader Ray Bloch.

== Musical numbers ==
1. "Bye Bye Birdie" – Kim
2. "The Telephone Hour" – Ursula and Sweet Apple Kids
3. "How Lovely to Be a Woman" – Kim
4. "We Love/Hate You Conrad" - Kim, Ursula, Hugo and Sweet Apple Kids
5. "Honestly Sincere" – Conrad
6. "Hymn for a Sunday Evening" – Harry, Doris, Kim and Randolph
7. "One Boy" – Kim, Hugo and Rosie
8. "Put on a Happy Face" – Albert and Rosie
9. "Kids" – Harry, Mae, Albert and Randolph
10. "One Last Kiss (Gym Rehearsal)" – Conrad
11. "A Lot of Livin' to Do" – Conrad, Kim, Hugo and Sweet Apple Kids
12. "Shriner's Ballet" – Rosie (non-vocal dance number)
13. "One Last Kiss" – Conrad
14. "Rosie" – Albert, Rosie, Kim and Hugo
15. "Bye Bye Birdie (Reprise)" – Kim

== Production ==
According to Ann-Margret, she was cast when director George Sidney saw her dancing while on a date at the Sands Casino on New Year's Eve 1961. Janet Leigh was "very upset that all the close-ups were going to Ann-Margret", as Leigh was billed as the lead female star of the film. Ann-Margret was paid $3,500 a week and earned $85,000 in total.

Sidney said that he was only to produce the film and that Gower Champion was to direct, but Champion told Sidney that he could not see the story as a film, so Sidney became the director.

== Reception ==
Bye Bye Birdie grossed $233,825 in its opening week at Radio City Music Hall in New York, a house record at that time. It was the eighth-highest-grossing film of 1963, earning $13.1 million domestically, of which distributor Columbia Pictures received $6.2 million in rentals.

=== Contemporary reviews ===
Wanda Hale of the New York Daily News gave the comedy a full four-star rating and said it "bubbles over with the vitality of youth and the fun of farce as it creates a teenage furor over a hip-twisting, leering rock 'n' roll male singer." Philip K. Scheuer of the Los Angeles Times said it "should repeat the success It scored on the stage and is in the smash class with 'West Side Story' and 'The Music Man.'" A user of the Mae Tinee pseudonym in the Chicago Tribune said "the music is pleasant, the dances are spritely, and it's all amiable, light entertainment." Ken Barnard of the Detroit Free Press stated that it "offers an attractive and tuneful means of saying bye, bye to the summer doldrums for a couple of hours." Margo Miller of The Boston Globe called the film "fantasy as Hollywood can best serve up, slick and funny." Harold Whitehead of the Montreal Gazette said it was "a quite handsome film with not too many drawbacks" but noted that Ann-Margret "is much too frenetic for our taste. When she calms down a little, she will probably be really something for the musical screen." Michael P. Feiner of the Montreal Star called it "a gay musical—sometimes farcical, sometimes mildly satirical, sometimes merely entertaining, but most of the time fun to watch." A critic for the Buffalo Evening News called it a "hilarious song-and-dance show" that "exaggerates youth's exuberance and carries its infectious exhilaration to the audience." Jay Carmody of The Evening Star in Washington said that "the picture, glowing with color and crazy camera tricks, flatters its natural audience no end. It presents the girls as beautiful, well, mostly, the boys as abounding in animal vitality, and both sexes as given to the kinds of enthusiasm that may one day really make this the best of all possible worlds. As for the elders among the performers, they come off as no more nor less Insufferable than teen-agers know them to be." He added that "the performers, and why not, have been astutely chosen by Mr. Sidney, starting with Ann-Margret (if I can leave out that second "a” in Margret, Mr. Printer, you can do it on a linotype) as the heroine. She's just fine and so are Janet Leigh and Dick Van Dyke, of the original cast, as the managers of Conrad Birdie's adieu party. Conrad himself is played by Jesse Pearson, a mad broth of a subhuman boy in a spaceman costume which he wears with all the nonworldly distinction anyone could ask."

Ann Pacey of the London Daily Herald was critical of Ann-Margret's performance in the film, but nonetheless called it "an entertaining and undemanding send-up of the kind of girlish lunacy that used to surround Elvis Presley and, in [the UK] at least, has now moved on to those four young men with the hair". Dick Richards of the Daily Mirror called it "a brash, colourful, good-humoured jest at the expense of the wild worship pop fans lavish on their favourites." A critic for The Times, also in London, was critical of the heavy plotting, which he felt "relegated" the songs "from the raison d'être of the film to something very like awkward interruptions, especially since except for 'A Lot of Living to Do' they are staged stodgily and without flair". However, he added that "there is no point in being too unkind to the film. It does contain good things, and it is generally diverting. It is even, in its picture of the popular idol (played to produce the proper ambiguity of attraction and repulsion by Jesse Pearson) and his screaming public, perhaps not too far off the mark. The only thing is that it is just good enough to make us think how much better it should have been."

The film received generally mixed-to-positive reviews in the state of Ohio itself. Brainard Platt of the Dayton Journal-Herald said it was "an excellent follow-up to the hit stage play of the same name" and a "real fun show for the whole family". E.B. Radcliffe of The Cincinnati Enquirer said the film "should be on your list of planned holiday fun" and called it a "good farce". Dale Stevens of The Cincinnati Post criticized the film for lacking the satirical edge of the musical, but said "this is unquestionably among the smash films of the year" and "should be the teenage sensation of the century". W. Ward Marsh of the Cleveland Plain Dealer wrote that "on occasion there is too much dredged up to stimulate laughter, but for the most part the film is eminently successful. Since we’ve not had a big screen musical for some time, Bye Bye Birdie should keep the Allen's audiences—and big ones, too—laughing." Tony Mastroianni of The Cleveland Press called it "another example of Hollywood taking a fair stage show, giving it the full treatment, and making something extra special out of it."

A more mixed review of the film was offered by David Cobb of the Toronto Daily Star, who liked Ann-Margret's and Leigh's performances, its humor and the musical numbers; as for everything else, he said "it is professionally, smoothly accomplished [but not] very engaging or dramatically interesting". Richard Roud of The Guardian said, "I wonder if anyone will remember any scenes from Bye Bye Birdie (Odeon, Marble Arch) in 20 years. I doubt it. Birdie is no On the Town, no Singing in the Rain, no Funny Face. But in a year as barren of American musicals as 1963 (and 1962 for that matter) it looks pretty good [...] and it makes quite a pleasant evening out." Bosley Crowther of The New York Times praised several of the musical numbers but wrote that "unfortunately, Mr. Sidney and his scriptwriter, Irving Brecher, have allowed the essence of this spirited musical comedy of Michael Stewart to get away from them. Not only do they lose Conrad Birdie in the mazes of their rearranged plot, but they lose the essential idea of satire and the pace and sparkle of the show." Les Wedman of the Vancouver Sun was more negative in his remarks, saying that the musical "as served up In the movie version, is a bit of a turkey, well-dressed but flavored with chestnuts and overdone to the point where it fell apart to reveal a pretty flimsy skeleton." Dickson Terry of the St. Louis Post-Dispatch said it "starts out to be a hilarious satire on the Elvis-type rock and roll singers and their swooning teen-age audiences but somewhere along the way it loses its bearings and turns into just another musical." Stanley Eichelbaum of the San Francisco Examiner wrote that "producer Fred Kohlmar has clumsily transformed 'Bye Bye Birdie' from a clever musical satire on American teenagers into a comic-strip movie for adolescents. It's true that certain vestiges of the stage work's devastating humor and vitality have crept Into the film at the Fox Warfield and Mission Drive-In. But on the whole, director George Sidney and screenwriter Irving Brecher have bludgeoned the original into semiconsciousness. Happily, no one tried too hard to spoil the bouncy score by Charles Strouse and Lee Adams. The musical numbers are the best part of the film and Onna White's choreography, which brightens most of the songs, is fresh and attractively original. And since the cast is generally young and eager—with Ann-Margret doing a surprisingly competent job as a nimble Ohio 15-year-old—the movie isn't exactly a total loss. But what it misses most is Gower Champion's sleek, galvanic direction, which kept the stage musical moving like a fine Swiss watch." Paine Knickerbocker of the San Francisco Chronicle praised the musical performances, but was critical of what he viewed as the loss of its satiric value.

James O'Neill Jr. of The Washington Daily News wrote that "two hours is simply two hours too long to tell a tired joke, but this is the length of 'Bye Bye Birdie,' at the Trans-Lux, and I was not transported by it. On the other hand, the children in the audience, who understand the attraction of rock and roll singers, and seek an idol in every guitar-playing yokel they can find, seemed to love 'Birdie,' and yelled and hollered and screamed as tho he were real. The film, as the stage musical before it, actually is supposed to be a biting comment on the musical taste of our adored teen-agers, and goes to some length to explain that most of their idols are ghastly tramps with little ability. They appeal largely to the post-puberty set for reasons better explained by a psychologist than a movie reviewer." Alexander Walker of the London Evening Standard observed that the musical "started life as a musical satire about the pop disc industry and the Presley-type idol drafted into the army and bestowing a symbolic farewell kiss on a typical teenage fan. Since then, the Beatles have replaced the Presley image, the female fan public has lowered its age from 16 to 14, and the pop-disc market has defeated satirists by outdoing anything they can do. This datedness would not matter to Bye Bye Birdie, which stars Janet Leigh, Ann-Margret and Dick Van Dyke, if it had five minutes of taste, wit, imagination or charm to redeem it. It hasn't."

=== 21st century reviews ===
On the review aggregator website Rotten Tomatoes, 87% of 30 critics' reviews are positive, with an average rating of 6.7/10. The website's consensus reads: "A poppy satire on pop music, Bye Bye Birdie is silly, light, and very, very pink." According to Filmink Ann-Margret "stole the show".

=== Accolades ===
Award	Category	Nominee(s)	Result
Academy Awards	Best Scoring of Music – Adaptation or Treatment	Johnny Green	Nominated
Academy Awards	Best Sound	Charles Rice	Nominated
Golden Globe Awards	Best Motion Picture – Musical or Comedy		Nominated
Golden Globe Awards	Best Actress in a Motion Picture – Musical or Comedy	Ann-Margret	Nominated
Laurel Awards	Top Comedy		4th Place
Laurel Awards	Top Musical		Nominated
Laurel Awards	Top Female Comedy Performance	Ann-Margret	Nominated

== In popular culture ==
- In 1964, the Carefrees scored a hit with novelty song titled "We Love You Beatles", based on the song "We Love You Conrad" from Bye Bye Birdie. The song peaked at No. 39 on the Billboard Hot 100. Outside the Plaza Hotel in New York, where the Beatles were staying for their first appearance on The Ed Sullivan Show, scores of their fans sang the song, hoping that the band would hear them in their rooms above.
- In an episode of the television series Mad Men (Season 3, Episode 2), the opening sequence of Bye Bye Birdie is shown twice, and Peggy Olson sings the song to herself in front of a mirror. Two episodes later, Salvatore Romano directs a parody of the sequence for a commercial for Pepsi's new diet drink Patio.

== See also ==
- List of American films of 1963
- Bye Bye Birdie (1995 film)
