= Amy Van Nostrand =

American actress (born 1953)

Amy van Nostrand
- Born: April 11, 1953 (age 73); Providence, Rhode Island, U.S.
- Occupation: Actress
- Years active: 1981–present
- Spouse: Tim Daly (m. 1982; div. 2010)

Amy Van Nostrand (born April 11, 1953) is an American actress. She has appeared on Broadway in The Hothouse by Harold Pinter; off-Broadway, she appeared in Pearl Theatre's Dance With Me.

== Early years ==
Van Nostrand was born in Providence, Rhode Island.

== Career ==
On Broadway, Van Nostrand appeared as Miss Cutts in The Hothouse. She has worked with many regional theatres including Huntington Theatre Company, George Street Playhouse, Williamstown Theatre Festival, Coast Playhouse, Pittsburgh Public Theater, Trinity Rep, Weston Playhouse Theatre Company, and The People's Light & Theatre Company.

In film and television her credits include Partners in Crime, Outside Providence, Execution of Justice, Say You’ll Be Mine, Deception, The House of Mirth, Made in Heaven, The Fugitive, Frasier, The Practice, Wings, Trial By Jury, Dangerous Heart, Almost Grown, Over My Dead Body, L.A. Law, Cagney and Lacey, The Flood, Kids Like These, Vietnam War Story, Family Album, U.S.A., and One Life to Live.

== Personal life ==
Van Nostrand married actor Tim Daly in 1982, and they divorced in 2010.

== Selected filmography ==
=== Feature films ===
Year	Film	Role	Other notes
1987	Made in Heaven	Girl At Clios	
1993	Ruby Cairo	Marge Swimmer, Faro Neighbor	
1999	Outside Providence	Mrs. Winston	
2000	Partners in Crime	Mrs. Weems	
2008	Ghost Town	Assorted Ghost #2	

=== Television ===
Year	Title	Role	Other notes
1981	The House of Mirth	Gwen Van Osburgh	
1984–1988	Cagney & Lacey	Bon Bon Le Chocolat/Carol Terry	Episodes: "Thank God It's Monday ", "Two Grand", "Button, Button"
1987	Vietnam War Story	Waller	Episode: "Home"
1987	L.A. Law	Nancy Shacter	Episode: "The Grace of Wrath"
1987	Kids Like This	Amy	
1993	The Flood: Who Will Save Our Children?	Linda Smith	
1994	Dangerous Heart	Emily	
1995	Wings	Gwen Tucker	Episode: "Have I Got a Couple for You"
1997	The Practice	Carolyn Wiggins-Clark	Episode: "Sex, Lies and Monkeys"
1998	Frasier	Janice	Episode: “The Maris Counselor”
1999	Execution of Justice	Mary Ann White	
2001	The Fugitive	Grace Tully	Episode: "And in That Darkness"
2004	Bereft	Jodi	
2004	Landslide	Ginger	
2006	Law & Order	Maddy	

=== Producer credits ===
Year	Title	Notes
1999	Seven Girlfriends	associate producer

== Theatre ==
=== Broadway ===
Year	Production	Playwright	Role	Notes and awards
1982	The Hothouse	Harold Pinter	Miss Cutts	Broadway debut; Performances: (May 6, 1982 - May 30, 1982)

=== Off-Broadway ===
Year	Production	Playwright	Role	Notes and awards
	Dance With Me			Performances: Pearl Theatre

=== Other Stage Credits ===
Year	Production	Playwright	Role	Notes and awards
1981	The Buried Child	Sam Shepard		Performances: Trinity Square Repertory Company, Providence, Rhode Island
1993	The Colorado Catechism	Vincent J. Cardinal		Performances: Coast Playhouse, Los Angeles; Won - 1993 Drama-Logue Award
2000	Ancestral Voices	A.R. Gurney		Performances: George Street Playhouse, New Brunswick, New Jersey
2001	Heartbreak House	George Bernard Shaw	Hesione Hushabye	Performances: Huntington Theatre Company at the Boston University Theatre, January 4 - February 3, 2001
	Love Letters	A. R. Gurney		Performances: Trinity Square Repertory Company, Providence, Rhode Island
2006	Something You Did	Willy Holtzman		Performances: People's Light and Theatre Company, Malvern, Pennsylvania
2008	Death of A Salesman	Arthur Miller	Linda Loman	Performances: Chautauqua Theater Company
2008	A View from the Bridge	Arthur Miller	Beatrice	Performances: The Guthrie Theatre, Minneapolis

== Awards ==
Year	Award	Category	Project	Result
1993	Drama-Logue Award	Outstanding Actress	The Colorado Catechism	Won
