= Sam Daly =

American actor (born 1984)

- Born: March 24, 1984 (age 42); Providence, Rhode Island, U.S.
- Occupation: Actor
- Years active: 2004–present
- Spouse: Marissa Bataille (m. 2015)
- Children: 2
- Parents: Tim Daly (father); Amy Van Nostrand (mother)
- Relatives: James Daly (grandfather); Tyne Daly (aunt)

Samuel Pierce Daly (born March 24, 1984) is an American actor. He is the son of actor Tim Daly and actress Amy Van Nostrand, and grandson of actor James Daly. His aunt is actress Tyne Daly. Daly attended Moses Brown School where he started to study acting. He is a 2006 graduate of Middlebury College, where he majored in Film and Media Studies.

He was captain of the basketball team his senior year. In a loss to Trinity College, Daly led his team in scoring with 18 points, all 3-pointers.

== Filmography ==
=== Feature films ===
| Year | Film | Role | Other notes |
|---|---|---|---|
| 2007 | The Education of Charlie Banks | Owen | |
| 2009 | Apology Day | Kenny | |
| 2012 | Red Tails | Mikey | |
| 2013 | Murder 101 | Thomas Reid | |
| 2013 | Waking | Harry | |
| 2013 | Redwood Highway | Buck | |
| 2013 | Justice League: The Flashpoint Paradox | Kal-El/Superman/Subject 1 | Voice |
| 2013 | Rays of Light | Brian | |
| 2016 | Black Road | Dylan | |
| 2018 | Office Uprising | Marcus Gantt | |
| 2019 | Before You Know It | Damien | |
| 2020 | Cut Throat City | O'Malley | |
| 2020 | Fatale | Officer Stallman | |

=== Television ===
| Year | Title | Role | Other notes |
|---|---|---|---|
| 2004 | Bereft | Kenny | |
| 2008 | Grey's Anatomy | Will | Episode: "Piece of My Heart" |
| 2008 | The Unit | Waiter | Episode: "Shadow Riders" |
| 2009–2010 | The Office | Matt | Episodes: "Secret Santa", "The Delivery: Part 2", "St. Patrick's Day", "Happy Hour" |
| 2010 | Hot In Cleveland | Justin | Episode: "Straight Outta Cleveland" |
| 2012 | Ben and Kate | Kate's Boyfriend | Episode: "Pilot" |
| 2012 | LA'd | Mr. Perfect | Episode: "Perfect" |
| 2012 | Hart of Dixie | Al O'Grady | Episode: "Sweetie Pies & Sweaty Palms" |
| 2012 | 90210 | Sam | Episode: "It's All Fun and Games" |
| 2014–2019 | Madam Secretary | Win Barrington | Episodes: "Collateral Damage", "Breakout Capacity", "Family Separation: Part 1", "Family Separation: Part 2" |
| 2016 | Modern Family | Vader's Dad | Episode: "Halloween 4: The Revenge of Rod Skyhook" |
| 2019 | The Magicians | Harcourt Caan | 2 episodes |
| 2020 | Hunters | Ron Davis | Episode: "Hunters: While Visions of Safta Danced in His Head" |
| 2022–2025 | Bel-Air | Coach Johnson | 6 episodes |
