= Tyne Daly =

American actress (born 1946)

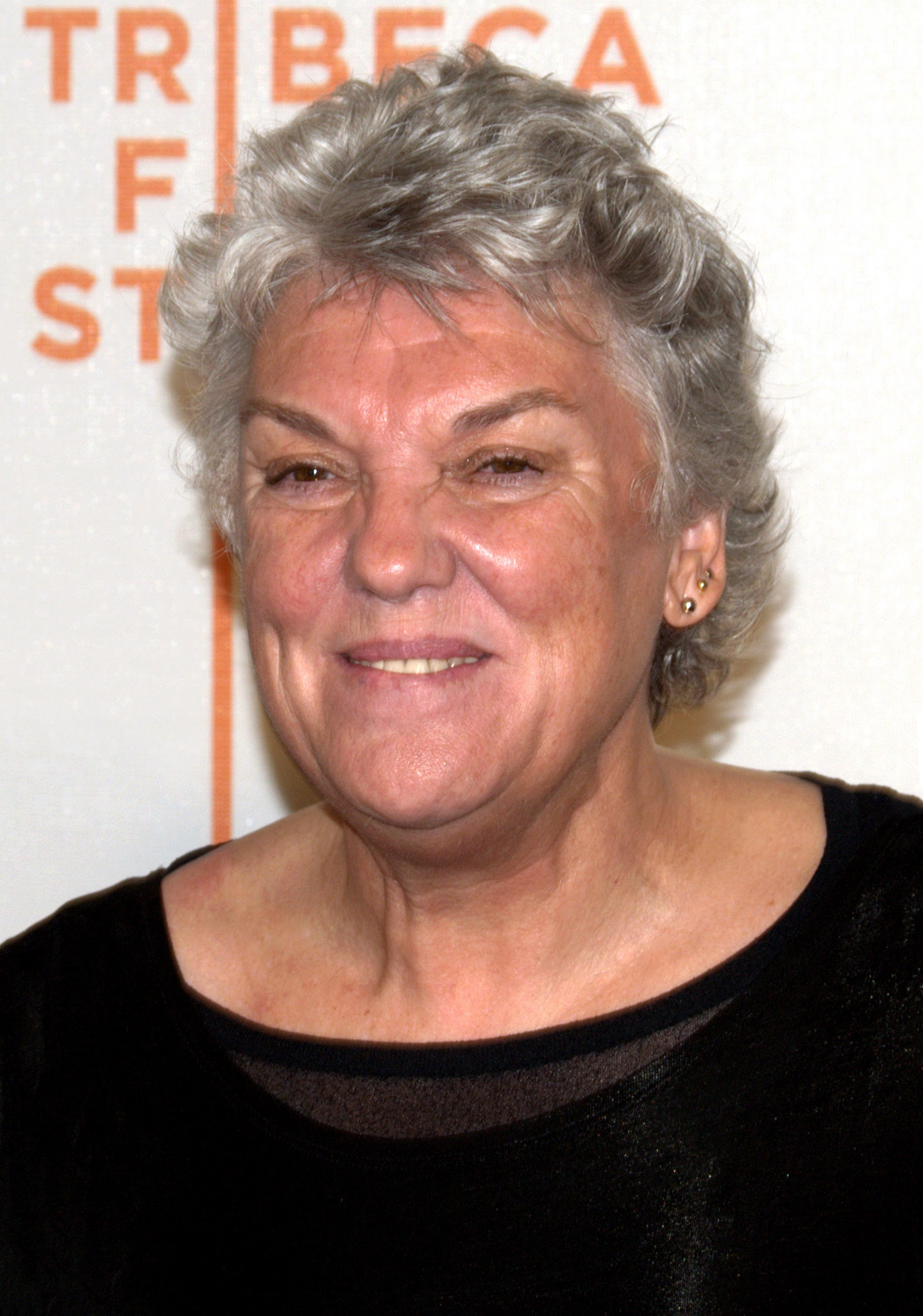
- Daly at the 2009 premiere of PoliWood
- Born: Ellen Tyne Daly; February 21, 1946 (age 80); Madison, Wisconsin, U.S.
- Education: Brandeis University; American Musical and Dramatic Academy
- Occupation: Actress
- Years active: 1963–present
- Known for: Cagney & Lacey; Gypsy; Christy; Rabbit Hole; Mothers and Sons; Judging Amy
- Spouse: Georg Stanford Brown (m. 1966; div. 1990)
- Children: 3
- Father: James Daly
- Relatives: Tim Daly (brother); Tea Leoni (sister-in-law); Sam Daly (nephew); George Kirgo (uncle)

Ellen Tyne Daly (/ˈtaɪn/; born February 21, 1946) is an American actress whose six-decade career included many leading roles in movies and theater. She has won six Emmy Awards for her television work and a Tony Award, and is a 2011 American Theatre Hall of Fame inductee.

Daly began her career on stage in summer stock in New York City, and made her Broadway debut in the play That Summer – That Fall in 1967. She is best known for her television role as Detective Mary Beth Lacey in the CBS police drama Cagney & Lacey (1982–88), for which she won four Primetime Emmy Awards for Outstanding Lead Actress in a Drama Series. She also won Emmy Awards for her roles as Alice Henderson in the period drama series Christy (1994–95) and Maxine Gray in the legal drama series Judging Amy (1999–2005).

She starred in the Broadway revival of Gypsy (1989), earning the Tony Award for Best Actress in a Musical. Her other Tony-nominated roles were in Rabbit Hole (2006) and Mothers and Sons (2014). She played Maria Callas, both on Broadway and in London's West End, in the play Master Class (2011–12). Her other Broadway credits include The Seagull (1992) and It Shoulda Been You (2015).

Daly made her film debut in John and Mary (1969). She is known for her film roles in The Enforcer (1976), Hello, My Name Is Doris (2015), and The Ballad of Buster Scruggs (2018). She received an Independent Spirit Award for Best Supporting Female nomination for her role in the Patrick Wang drama A Bread Factory (2018). She portrayed Anne Marie Hoag in Marvel Studios' Spider-Man: Homecoming (2017).

== Early years and education ==
Daly was born in Madison, Wisconsin, to actor James Daly and actress Mary Hope (née Newell). She is of Irish descent, her ancestors being from Limerick and County Kerry. Her younger brother is actor Tim Daly.

She was raised in Rockland County, New York, where she started her career by performing in summer stock with her family; she earned her equity card at age 15. She studied at Brandeis University and the American Musical and Dramatic Academy.

== Career ==
=== 1967–1980: Career beginnings ===
Daly's first Broadway role was in 1967 in a short-lived play, That Summer, That Fall.

Daly appeared in John and Mary (1969), Angel Unchained (1970), Play It as It Lays (1972), and The Adulteress. She was cast as Inspector Harry Callahan's first female partner, Kate Moore, in the 1976 Dirty Harry film The Enforcer. The film was critically panned, though a box office success. Daly's performance divided critics, with some calling it too "mannered" for film, while others praised the strength she brought to the role. The concept of a male/female police partnership was later used as the basis for the television show Hunter.

=== 1981–2005: Breakthrough and stardom ===
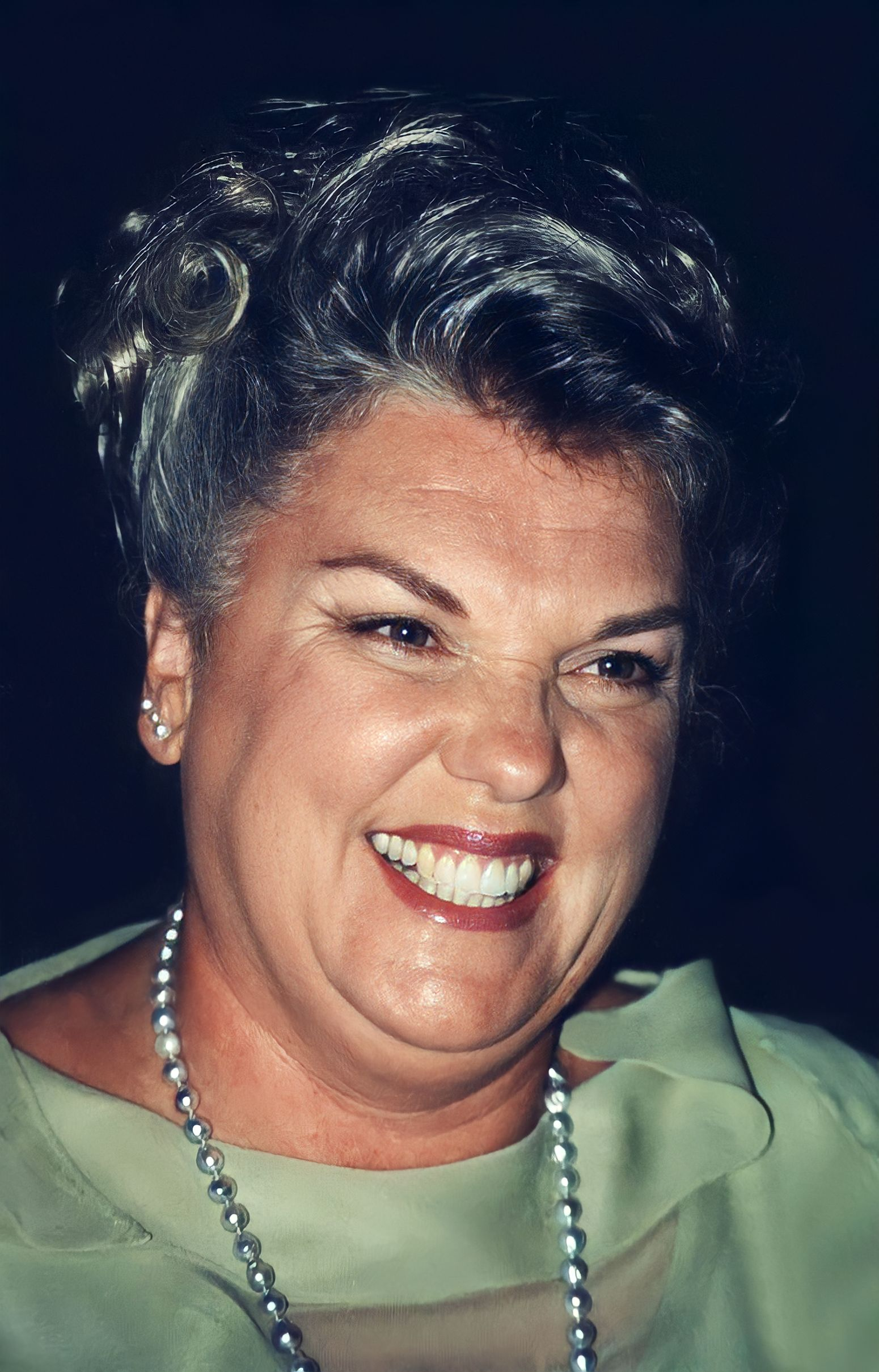
Daly in 1997

Daly appeared in the 1981 movie Zoot Suit directed by Luis Valdez. She played the role of Alice Bloomfield opposite Danny Valdéz and Edward James Olmos. Daly appeared in the CBS police-procedural crime drama Cagney & Lacey as Mary Beth Lacey, the married working mother. She won the Emmy Award for Outstanding Lead Actress in a Drama Series four times, in 1983, 1984, 1985, and 1988, and was a nominee in 1986 and 1987. Between co-star Sharon Gless and her, they won the Primetime Emmy Award for Outstanding Lead Actress in a Drama Series six years in a row.

In 1988, Daly appeared on the Dolly Parton TV variety show Dolly, and sang (at her request) a duet with Parton. Broadway producer Barry Brown saw the show, and impressed by Daly's performance, decided to mount a revival of the musical Gypsy with Daly in the lead role of Rose. Cagney & Lacey had finished airing, and Daly agreed. In April 1989, the Daly-helmed Gypsy revival began a 14-city U.S. tour; it was then presented on Broadway in November 1989. This production was the second revival of the show to play Broadway (the first was in 1974 with Angela Lansbury). Daly won the 1990 Tony Award for Best Actress in a Musical for her performance in Gypsy. Daly left Gypsy in July 1990, with Linda Lavin playing Rose, and returned in April 1991 through closing in July 1991.

In 1991, Daly guest-starred on her brother Tim's series Wings, playing a woman who dates Brian Hackett (Steven Weber), brother of Tim's character Joe. She appeared in the Broadway revival of The Seagull in 1992 as Madame Arkadina. She appeared as Sally Adams in the City Center Encores! staged concert of Call Me Madam in February 1995. In regional theatre, she played Lola in Come Back, Little Sheba at the Los Angeles Theatre Center, Los Angeles, in April 1997.

She appeared as social worker Maxine Gray, who was also the mother to the show's title character on the CBS drama Judging Amy, which ran from 1999 to 2005. Addressing a conference of the National Association of Social Workers in 2000, Daly said she had learned from social workers and social-work texts to improve her portrayal of her character, and she added: "I take from you because you are the ones dealing with all the bad institutions of our society: institutionalized poverty, institutionalized racism, institutionalized cynicism." Daly appeared in the Lifetime television film Undercover Christmas in 2003 as Anne Cunningham. Among her later television roles, Daly reunited with Cagney & Lacey costar Sharon Gless in a 2010 guest role on the series Burn Notice.

=== 2006–present: Return to Broadway ===
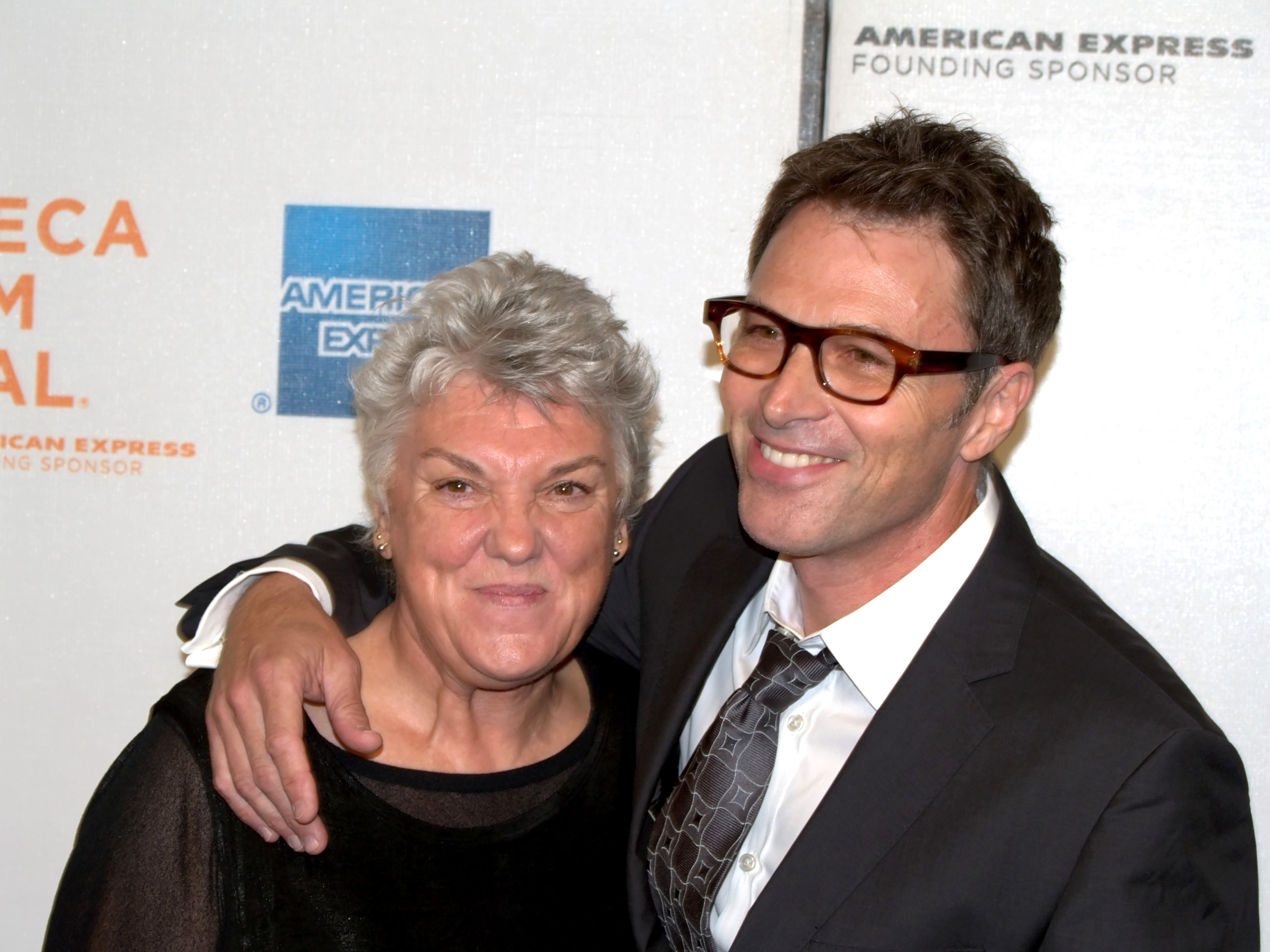
Daly with her brother Tim Daly at the 2009 Tribeca Film Festival

She appeared on Broadway in the David Lindsay-Abaire play Rabbit Hole (2006) portraying the mother of the play's protagonist, played by Cynthia Nixon. For her performance she was nominated for the Tony Award for Best Featured Actress in a Play. In January 2008, she played the role of Mother in the world premiere production of Edward Albee's Me, Myself & I at the McCarter Theatre, Princeton, New Jersey. In 2009, she appeared in the original cast of Love, Loss, and What I Wore. Daly performed a cabaret act, Second Time Around, in January 2010 at Feinstein's at Loews Regency, New York City. She had previously performed at Feinstein's in May 2009.

During this time, she took several roles in television, including portraying Mabel Dodge Luhan in the Lifetime movie Georgia O'Keeffe acting alongside Jeremy Irons and Joan Allen. She also guest-starred as Carolyn Shepherd in a 2009 episode of the ABC medical drama series Grey's Anatomy and Tina in the 2010 episode of the USA Network series Burn Notice. She starred as Maria Callas in the Terrence McNally play Master Class at the Manhattan Theater Club on Broadway, from June 14, 2011 (previews) to September 4, 2011. For her performance she was nominated for the Outer Critics Circle Awards for Best Actress in a Play. Daly reprised her role as Maria Callas in the West End production of Master Class, which opened at the Vaudeville Theatre on February 7, 2012 (after previews from January 21) in a limited engagement to April 28, 2012. In 2014 she had a guest-starring role as imperious teacher Mrs. Plank in the ABC sitcom Modern Family in the 2014 episode "Won't You Be Our Neighbor." She originated the role of Judy Steinberg in It Shoulda Been You, at the George Street Playhouse, New Brunswick, New Jersey, which ran from October 4 to November 6, 2011. The musical ran on Broadway in 2015.

She took supporting roles in the independent film Hello, My Name Is Doris starring Sally Field and the romantic comedy film Basmati Blues (2017) with Brie Larson, and played Anne Marie Hoag in the Marvel Cinematic Universe film Spider-Man: Homecoming (2017). She had a minor role in the Coen Brothers anthology Western film The Ballad of Buster Scruggs (2018). That same year, she had a leading role in the Patrick Wang films A Bread Factory Part 1 & 2 (2018). In the fall of that year, Daly joined the cast of the revival of the Murphy Brown series, playing the character of Phyllis, who runs the bar that Murphy and her coworkers often patronize. She also guest-starred in Grey's Anatomy in 2019, Madam Secretary in 2019, and Mom in 2021. In 2024 Daly was set to return to Broadway in a revival of John Patrick Shanley's play Doubt opposite Liev Schreiber; however, she withdrew from the production after being hospitalized.

== Public image and legacy ==
Daly has been identified as a feminist icon in the media, particularly based on her television role in Cagney and Lacey. Her role as Lacey showed a woman detective at a time when the idea was still novel; the show was also novel in presenting Lacey primarily in a work environment, rather than always showing the character at home. She has also been outspoken about maintaining a natural appearance as she ages, and for the run of Judging Amy, Daly's hair was in its naturally gray state and not dyed.

== Personal life ==
Daly was married to Georg Stanford Brown from 1966 to 1990. They have three daughters.

== Filmography ==
=== Film ===
Year	Title	Role	Notes
1969	John and Mary	Hillary	
1970	Angel Unchained	Merilee	
1972	Play It As It Lays	Journalist	
1973	The Adulteress	Inez Steiner	
1976	The Enforcer	Inspector Kate Moore	
1977	Speedtrap	Niffty Nolan	
1977	Telefon	Dorothy Putterman	
1981	Zoot Suit	Alice Bloomfield	
1985	The Aviator	Evelyn Stiller	
1985	Movers & Shakers	Nancy Derman	
1997	The Lay of the Land	Dr. Guttmacher	
1999	The Autumn Heart	Ann	
2000	The Simian Line	Arnita	
2000	A Piece of Eden	Aunt Aurelia	
2015	Hello, My Name Is Doris	Roz	
2017	Spider-Man: Homecoming	Anne-Marie Hoag	
2017	Basmati Blues	Evelyn	
2018	The Ballad of Buster Scruggs	Lady (Mrs. Betjeman)	Segment "The Mortal Remains"
2018	A Bread Factory, Part One	Dorothea	
2018	A Bread Factory, Part Two	Dorothea	

=== Television ===
Year	Title	Role	Notes
1954	Foreign Intrigue	Girl	Episode: "International Finance"
1968	General Hospital	Caroline Beale	
1968	The Virginian	Faith Bradbury	Episode: "The Orchard"
1969	Judd, for the Defense	Sandy Jamieson	Episode: "The View from the Ivy Tower"
1969	CBS Playhouse	Sarah	Episode: "Sadbird"
1969	The Mod Squad	Dolores Abernathy	Episode: "The Death of Wild Bill Hannachek"
1970	The New People	Kathy	Episode: "On the Horizon"
1970	Ironside	Joanna Leigh	Episode: "The People Against Judge McIntire"
1970	Medical Center	Jennifer Lochner	Episode: "Moment of Decision"
1971	In Search of America	Anne	Television film
1971	A Howling in the Woods	Sally Bixton	Television film
1971	Longstreet	Marcella	Episode: "One in the Reality Column"
1971	McMillan & Wife	Janet Benton	Episode: "Husbands, Wives, and Killers"
1971	Mission: Impossible	Saretta Lane	Episode: "Nerves"
1972	Heat of Anger	Jean Carson	Television film
1972	Young Dr. Kildare	Rachel Dixon	Episode: "The Thing with Feathers"
1972	Mod Squad	Prudence Gordon	Episode: "Good Times Are Just Memories"
1972	Medical Center	Barbara	Episode: "The Choice"
1973	Medical Center	April	Episode: "Deadly Game"
1973	Ghost Story	Anna Freeman	Episode: "Earth, Air, Fire and Water"
1973	Hawkins	Ellen Hamilton	Episode: "A Life for a Life"
1973	The Rookies	Marly Devon	Episode: "A Farewell Tree from Marly"
1973	The Man Who Could Talk to Kids	Susie Datweiler	Television film
1974	Larry	Nancy Hockworth	Television film
1974	The Rookies	Lucille Baker	Episode: "Time Lock"
1974	The Streets of San Francisco	Mrs. Carlino	Episode: "Commitment"
1974	Doc Elliot	Beth Ann Blackner	Episode: "The Touch of God"
1974	Barnaby Jones	Madge Winston	Episode: "A Gathering of Thieves"
1974	The Wide World of Mystery	Laurie	Episode: "The Haunting of Penthouse D"
1975	Lucas Tanner	Jenny Milo	Episode: "Collision"
1975	The Law	Lucy	TV miniseries
1975	Medical Center	Liz Lathem	Episode: "Gift from a Killer"
1975	The Rookies	Mary	Episode: "Cliffy"
1976	The Entertainer	Jean	Television film
1976	The Rookies	Amy Kennedy	Episode: "From Out the Darkness"
1977	Intimate Strangers	Karen Renshaw	Television movie
1977	Visions	Ann	Episode: "The Dancing Bear"
1978	Greatest Heroes of the Bible	Abishag	Episode: "The Judgment of Solomon"
1979	Shirley	Athena	Episode: "Twenty Years to Life"
1979	Better Late Than Never	Ms. Davis	Television film
1980	The Women's Room	Adele	Television film
1980	Quincy, M.E.	Madeline Estes	Episode: "The Night Killer"
1981	A Matter of Life and Death	Donna	Television film
1981	Quincy, M.E.	Kay Silver	Episode: "Gentle Into That Good Night"
1981	CBS Afternoon Playhouse	Catherine Ellis	Episode: "The Great Gilly Hopkins"
1981	Lou Grant	Melissa Cummings	Episode: "Violence"
1981–1988	Cagney & Lacey	Det. Mary Beth Lacey	Main Cast; 126 episodes
1982	Magnum, P.I.	Kate Sullivan	Episode: "The Jororo Kill"
1982	Quincy, M.E.	Anna Krushevitz	Episode: "For Love of Joshua"
1983	Your Place... or Mine	Karen	Television film
1983	The Mississippi	Performer	Episode: "The Shooting"
1986	Wanted: A Room with Love	Narrator	Television special
1987	Kids Like These	Joanna Goodman	Television film
1988	Dolly	Genevieve	Episode: "1.20"
1989	Stuck with Each Other	Sylvia Cass	Television film
1991	The Last to Go	Mary Ellen	Television film
1991	Face of a Stranger	Dollie Madison	Television film
1991	The Trials of Rosie O'Neill	Vicki Lindman	Episode: "The Reunion"
1991	Wings	Mimsy Borogroves	Episode: "My Brother's Keeper"
1992	Swamp Thing	Carla Jeffries	Episode: "Lesser of Two Evils"
1992	The Ray Bradbury Theater	Cora Gibbs	Episode: "Great Wide World Over There"
1992	Columbo	Dolores McCain	Episode: "A Bird in the Hand..."
1993	No Room for Opal	Glorene	Television film
1993	Scattered Dreams	Kathryn Messenger	Television film
1994	The Forget-Me-Not Murders	Dr. Archer	Television film
1994	Christy	Alice Henderson	Television film
1994	The Return	Mary Beth Lacey	A Cagney & Lacey television film
1994	Columbo	Dorothea McNally	Episode: "Undercover"
1994–1995	The Magic School Bus	Dr. Tennelli	Voice, 2 episodes: "Inside Ralphie" and "Going Batty"
1994–1995	Christy	Alice Henderson	Main Cast; 20 episodes
1995	The Nanny	Mona	Episode: "Strange Bedfellows"
1995	Together Again	Mary Beth Lacey	A Cagney & Lacey Television film
1995	Bye Bye Birdie	Mae Peterson	Television film
1995	The View Through the Glass Ceiling	Mary Beth Lacey	A Cagney & Lacey Television film
1996	True Convictions	Mary Beth Lacey	A Cagney & Lacey television film
1997	The Perfect Mother	Elanie Podaras	Television film
1997	Tricks	Sarah	Television film
1998	Vig	Ellen	Television film
1998	For Your Love	Mary Winston	Episode: "The Mother of All Visits"
1999	Three Secrets	Shelley	Television film
1999	Absence of the Good	Dr. Marcia Lyons	Television film
1999	Execution of Justice	Goldie Judge	Television film
1999	Veronica's Closet	Emily Blair	Episode: "Veronica's from Venus/Josh's Parents Are from Mars"
1999	The Magnificent Seven	Ma Nichols	Episode: "Vendetta"
1999–2005	Judging Amy	Maxine Gray	Main Cast; 138 episodes
2001	The Wedding Dress	Joan Delano	Television film
2003	Undercover Christmas	Anne Cunningham	Television film
2009	Georgia O'Keeffe	Mabel Dodge Stern	Television film
2009–2019	Grey's Anatomy	Carolyn Shepherd	2 episodes
2010	Burn Notice	Tina	Episode: "A Dark Road"
2014	Modern Family	Mrs. Plank	Episode: "Won't You Be Our Neighbor"
2016	Looking: The Movie	Justice of the Peace	Television film
2018	Murphy Brown	Phyllis	13 episodes
2019	Madam Secretary	Senator Amy Ross	Episode: "Leaving the Station"
2021	Mom	Barbara	Episode: "Whip-Its and Emotionally Attuned Babies"
2026	Leanne	Nancy	Episode: "The Old Cat Had Her Reasons"

=== Theatre ===
Year	Production	Role	Venue	Ref
Broadway roles
1967	That Summer - That Fall	Josie	Helen Hayes Theatre, Broadway	
1989	Gypsy	Rose	St. James Theatre, Marquis Theatre, National tour (1989–91)	
1992	The Seagull	Madame Arkadina	Lyceum Theatre	
2006	Rabbit Hole	Nat	Biltmore Theatre	
2011	Master Class	Maria Callas	Samuel J. Friedman Theatre	
2014	Mothers and Sons	Katharine Gerard	John Golden Theatre	
2015	It Shoulda Been You	Judy Steinberg	Brooks Atkinson Theater	
Off-Broadway roles
1966	The Butter and Egg Man	Jane Weston	Cherry Lane Theatre	
1995	Call Me Madam	Sally Adams	Encores!, New York City Center	
1998	Mystery School	Performer	Angel Orensanz Center	
2009	Love, Loss, and What I Wore	Performer	Westside Theatre	
2017	Dear World	Countess Aurelia	York Theatre Company	
2018	Downstairs	Irene	Primary Stages, Cherry Lane Theatre	
Other stage credits
1963	Jenny Kissed Me	Performer	Bucks County Playhouse, New Hope, Pennsylvania	
2008	Agamemnon	Clytaemnestra	Getty Villa, Malibu, California	
2010	The Second Time Around	Cabaret	Feinstein's at the Regency, New York City	
2010	Master Class	Maria Callas	Kennedy Center	
2011	It Shoulda Been You	Mother of the Bride	George Street Playhouse, New Brunswick, New Jersey	
2012	Master Class	Maria Callas	Vaudeville Theatre, London	
2013	Ragtime	Emma Goldman	Avery Fisher Hall	
2016	Dear World	Countess Aurelia	Valley Performing Arts Center, Los Angeles	
2017	Chasing Mem'ries	Victoria	The Geffen Playhouse, Los Angeles	

Note: Tyne was scheduled to return to Broadway in the 2024 revival of Doubt: A Parable as Sister Aloysius, but was forced to pull out of performances the week previews began due to a brief hospital stay. Amy Ryan stepped in to fill the role for the remainder of its run.

== Awards and nominations ==
Daly has been nominated for the Emmy Award a total of 16 times; she has won 6 times, for the following television performances:

- Lead Actress in a Drama Series for Cagney and Lacey in 1983, 1984, 1985, and 1988
- Supporting Actress in a Drama Series for Christy in 1996
- Supporting Actress in a Drama Series for Judging Amy in 2003

She was also recognized for her work on Broadway receiving a Tony Award with three nominations:

- Best Actress in a Musical, winner, for Rose in Gypsy (1990)
- Best Featured Actress in a Play, nominee, for Nat in Rabbit Hole (2006)
- Best Actress in a Play, nominee, for Katharine in Mothers and Sons (2014)

== Discography ==
- Bernstein: On the Town, conducted by Michael Tilson Thomas, Deutsche Grammophon, 1993
