= Bye Bye Birdie (1995 film) =

1995 television film

- Genre: Musical; Comedy
- Based on: Bye Bye Birdie by Charles Strouse; Lee Adams and Michael Stewart
- Written by: Michael Stewart
- Directed by: Gene Saks
- Starring: Jason Alexander; Vanessa Williams; Chynna Phillips; Tyne Daly; Marc Kudisch; George Wendt; Sally Mayes
- Composers: Charles Strouse; Lee Adams
- Country of origin: America
- Original language: English

Production
- Executive producer: Robert Halmi Sr.
- Producers: Tim Bell; J. Boyce Harman Jr.
- Production locations: British Columbia; Vancouver
- Cinematography: Glen MacPherson
- Editor: Eric Albertson
- Camera setup: Multi-Camera
- Running time: 135 mins
- Production company: RHI Entertainment

Original release
- Release: December 3, 1995

Bye Bye Birdie is a 1995 musical comedy television film directed by Gene Saks with a screenplay by Michael Stewart based on his book of the 1960 stage musical of the same name. It features music and lyrics by Charles Strouse and Lee Adams respectively. It stars Jason Alexander and Vanessa Williams and features Chynna Phillips, Tyne Daly, Marc Kudisch, George Wendt, and Sally Mayes. It was produced by RHI Entertainment and released by ABC on December 3, 1995. It is the second film adaptation of the musical, the first being in 1963.

== Plot ==
In 1959, it is announced that Conrad Birdie (loosely based on Elvis Presley), the most popular rock and roll singer, is to be drafted into the army, upsetting teenagers across the country. Included in this group are Albert Peterson, Birdie's manager and songwriter, and Rose 'Rosie' Alvarez, his long-time girlfriend. Rose tells Albert that she wants him to leave the music and study to become an English teacher at NYU ("An English Teacher"). However, Albert's mother, Mae, wants him to continue managing Al-mae-lou, the music studio she and Albert created. Rosie comes up with an idea for one final public stunt before Birdie's drafting. She plans to pick a girl from a stack of names and send Birdie to kiss her and sing one final song on live television. Kim MacAfee from Sweet Apple, Ohio, is chosen, but all the phone lines there are busy. This is due to the news that Kim got pinned to Hugo Peabody ("The Telephone Hour").

In Sweet Apple, Kim decides to mature into a grown woman ("How Lovely To Be A Woman") but quickly loses this mentality when she learns that she will be kissed by Birdie. Albert and Rosie arrive in Penn Station to see Conrad off to Sweet Apple and Albert confronts a girl about being too old to date Birdie when he comes back from war ("Put On A Happy Face"). Conrad arrives, and Albert and Rosie feed reporters false stories in an attempt to clean up his past ("A Healthy, Normal American Boy"). Hugo worries that Birdie's arrival will cause Kim to break up with him, but she assures him that Conrad means nothing to her ("One Boy"). Though everyone is ablaze about Birdie's arrival, Rosie is still upset about Albert's career choice ("Let's Settle Down").

Birdie is awarded a key to the city by the mayor of Sweet Apple but the ceremony breaks into chaos when he begins singing ("Honestly Sincere"). Harry MacAfee, Kim's father, is frustrated about all the commotion in the town and in their house, as Birdie is now staying in their home, but Albert makes him feel better by promising that he and the rest of the MacAfees will all be featured on The Ed Sullivan Show ("Hymn For A Sunday Evening (Ed Sullivan)"). During the broadcast ("One Last Kiss"), Hugo, with the help of Rosie, punches Conrad before he kisses Kim. Rosie goes back to the MacAfee home and packs her things as she regrets her relationship with Albert ("What Did I Ever See In Him"). Kim wants to join Rosie, but she doesn't allow it. However, Kim sneaks out anyway to go on a date with Birdie and hang out with the rest of the teens. The parents of Sweet Apple soon learn that all their children are missing, and Harry reminisces over a time when children obeyed their parents ("Kids").

Rosie has ended up in Maude's Bar, where she tells the men sitting at the counter that she is single ("Spanish Rose"). Albert calls the bar, begging Rosie for her forgiveness ("Talk To Me") but gets none from her. Meanwhile, Kim and Conrad are hiding from their parents in "the ice house" but she leaves when Conrad begins to pressure her into sexual intercourse. Albert and Rosie, looking for the teens, are stopped by Mae, who tries to convince Albert to stay in the music business again. He finally stands up for himself, and she dramatically says her goodbyes to the world ("A Mother Doesn't Matter Anymore"). He proudly leaves his mother alone ("A Giant Step") and continues to search for Kim. Meanwhile, Conrad is arrested by the police for statutory rape. Sometime later, Conrad (dressed as Rosie) and Albert are seen at a train station where they are expecting Mae. His mother arrives, and he puts them both on a train out of Ohio, left alone to bicker with one another. Rosie comes rushing in, worrying that they have missed the train, but Albert assures her that it was part of a plan. He tells her that he plans to take a teaching position in Pumpkin Falls, Iowa, and proposes to her, claiming that he must be married to take the position. She happily accepts, and he reflects on all her wonderful qualities ("Rosie").

== Cast ==
- Jason Alexander as Albert J. Peterson
- Vanessa Williams as Rose 'Rosie' Alvarez
- Chynna Phillips as Kim MacAfee
- Tyne Daly as Mae Peterson
- Marc Kudisch as Conrad Birdie
- George Wendt as Harry MacAfee
- Sally Mayes as Doris MacAfee
- Jason Gaffney as Hugo F. Peabody
- Blair Slater as Randolph MacAfee
- Vicki Lewis as Gloria Rasputin
- Brigitta Dau as Ursula Merkle
- Angela Brydon as The Sad Face Girl
- Jay Brazeau as The Mayor
- Nicole Robert as Edna, The Mayor's Wife
- Garry Chalk as Maude
- Capper McIntyrre as Mr. Johnson
- Sheelah Megill as Mrs. Merkle

=== Teens ===
- Shelley S. Hunt as Alice
- Marlowe Windsor-Menard as Suzie
- Brenna Quan as Penelope-Ann
- Angela Quinn as Debra Sue
- Debbie Timuss as Nancy
- Julie Tomaino as Margie
- Chiara Zanni as Helen
- Kristian Ayre as Harvey Johnson
- Duane Keogh as Freddie
- Chancz Perry as Karl

== Musical numbers ==
- "Main Title (Bye Bye Birdie)" - Orchestra
- "An English Teacher" - Rosie
- "The Telephone Hour" - The Teens
- "How Lovely To Be A Woman" - Kim
- "Bye Bye Birdie"- The Teen Girls
- "Put On a Happy Face" - Albert
- "A Healthy, Normal American Boy" - Albert, Rosie, Teens
- "One Boy" - Kim, Teens
- "Let's Settle Down" - Rosie
- "Honestly Sincere" - Conrad
- "Hymn for a Sunday Evening (Ed Sullivan)" - Harry, Doris, Kim, Randolph
- "One Last Kiss" - Conrad
- "What Did I Ever See In Him" - Rosie, Kim
- "A Lot of Livin' to Do" - Conrad, Kim, Teens
- "Kids" - Harry, Mae
- "Spanish Rose" - Rosie
- "Talk To Me" - Albert
- "A Mother Doesn't Matter Anymore" - Mae
- "A Giant Step" - Albert
- "Rosie" - Albert, Rosie
- "End Credits (Bye Bye Birdie)" - Kim, Orchestra

== Reception ==
The TV movie won an Emmy Award in 1996 for Outstanding Music and Lyrics and was nominated for Outstanding Music Direction and Outstanding Hairstyling for a Miniseries or a Special.

The film was the fourth most-watched program the night of its premiere, behind Shadow of a Doubt on NBC, The Haunting of Helen Walker on CBS, and new episodes of Married... with Children and What's So Funny? on Fox.
