= Welcome to the Club (musical) =

- Opening Night Broadway Playbill
- Music: Cy Coleman
- Lyrics: Cy Coleman; A. E. Hotchner
- Book: A. E. Hotchner
- Productions: 1989 Broadway

Welcome to the Club is a 1989 Broadway musical with music and lyrics by Cy Coleman. Set in a New York City jail for alimony violators, the musical was directed by Peter Mark Schifter and opened at the Music Box Theatre on April 13, 1989. Poor reviews led the production to close on April 22, after only twelve performances.

The New York Times deemed the musical "embarrassingly out of touch with the present-day realities of men, women, sex, marriage and divorce", with limited praise given to Coleman's "inconsistent" score.

Despite flopping at the box office, the musical garnered two Tony nominations: Best Featured Actor in a Musical (Scott Wentworth) and Best Direction of a Musical (Schifter). In her Broadway debut, actress Sally Mayes won a 1989 Theatre World award.

== Songs ==
Act I

- A Place Called Alimony Jail - Husbands and Wives
- Pay the Lawyer - Husbands
- Mrs. Meltzer Wants the Money Now! - Arlene Meltzer and Husbands
- That's a Woman - Aaron Bates, Carol Bates and Wives
- Piece of Cake - Eve Aiken and Bruce Aiken
- Rio - Milton Meltzer, Arlene Meltzer, Wives and Gus Bottomly
- Holidays - Arlene Meltzer
- The Trouble with You - Aaron Bates, Carol Bates, Husbands and Wives
- Mother-in-Law - Husbands
- At My Side - Bruce Aiken and Kevin Bursteter

Act II

- Southern Comfort - Winona Shook, Aaron Bates, Wives and Husbands
- The Two of Us - Bruce Aiken and Milton Meltzer
- It's Love! It's Love! - Gus Bottomly and Husbands
- The Name of Love - Carol Bates
- Miami Beach - Arlene Meltzer and Husbands
- Guilty - Winona Shook
- Love Behind Bars - Winona Shook, Aaron Bates and Wives
- At My Side (Reprise) - Kevin Bursteter and Betty Bursteter
- It Wouldn't Be You - Husbands and Wives

== Awards and nominations ==
=== Original Broadway production ===
Year	Award	Category	Nominee	Result
1989	Tony Award	Best Performance by a Featured Actor in a Musical	Scott Wentworth	Nominated
1989	Tony Award	Best Direction of a Musical	Peter Mark Schifter	Nominated
1989	Theatre World Award		Sally Mayes	Won
