= The Adulteress (1973 film) =

1973 film directed by Norbert Meisel

- Directed by: Norbert Meisel
- Written by: Norbert Meise; Gregory Morton
- Produced by: Mihaly T. Lenart; Norbert Meisel
- Starring: Eric Braeden; Tyne Daly; Gregory Morton; Margaret Cook
- Cinematography: Mihaly T. Lenart
- Edited by: Mihaly T. Lenart
- Music by: Ted Shreffler
- Release date: 1973 (U.S.)
- Running time: 85 minutes
- Language: English

The Adulteress is a 1973 drama film directed by Norbert Meisel and starring Eric Braeden, Tyne Daly, Gregory Morton, and Margaret Cook.

== Premise ==
A couple cannot conceive a child and they hire a young drifter to solve their problem.

== Cast ==
- Eric Braeden as Hank Baron
- Tyne Daly as Inez Steiner
- Gregory Morton as Carl Steiner
- Margaret Cook as Jessica
- Lynn Roth as Vikki
- Malek Paul Wazzan as Boy

== Reception ==
The film received a negative review from Leonard Maltin.
