= Jesse Pearson (actor) =

American actor (1930–1979)

- Pearson undated photo (Internet Movie Database)
- Born: Bobby Wayne Pearson; August 18, 1930; Seminole, Oklahoma, U.S.
- Died: December 5, 1979 (aged 49); Monroe, Louisiana, U.S.
- Occupations: Actor and screenwriter

Jesse Pearson (born Bobby Wayne Pearson; August 18, 1930 – December 5, 1979) was an American actor, singer, director, and writer.

== Career ==
After releasing two singles on Decca Records with little success, Pearson was heard by composer Charles Strouse, who recommended him for the national tour of the musical Bye Bye Birdie. When Dick Gautier, the original actor playing Conrad Birdie, fell ill, Pearson took the role of the rock idol inspired by Elvis Presley. He repeated his characterization in the 1963 film version, Bye Bye Birdie. That same year (1963), he made two unsuccessful singles for RCA records. One of them, "One Last Kiss", was a song from the movie. This was followed by a performance in the Glenn Ford comedy Advance to the Rear (1964), but because he had no more film offers, he turned to television, appearing in shows such as Bonanza, The Andy Griffith Show, McHale's Navy, The Great Adventure and The Beverly Hillbillies. In the next decade, Pearson narrated the film The Norseman (1978), a Viking saga starring Lee Majors and Cornel Wilde.

As expressions of sexuality became culturally more free, Pearson wrote two adult films, Pro-Ball Cheerleader (1979) and The Legend of Lady Blue (1978), which he also directed, both under the name, A. Fabritzi.

Pearson was also the narrator of many albums, including Rod McKuen's The Sea (1967) and Home to the Sea (1968), as recorded by the San Sebastian Strings; as well as The Body Electric and The Body Electric-2, two LPs based on poems by Walt Whitman, with music by McKuen, released in the early 1970s; the album tribute to songwriter-singer Woody Guthrie, We Ain't Down Yet (1976); and two religious albums by Jaime Mendoza-Nava: And Jesus Said... and Meditation in Psalms, also in 1976. Pearson also recorded the album The Glory of Love for RCA Victor, which remains unreleased to this day.

== Death ==
Pearson was diagnosed with cancer and moved to Monroe, Louisiana, to be near his mother, dying there at age 49 on December 5, 1979.
