= Bereft (film) =

- Written by: Peter Ferland
- Directed by: Tim Daly and J. Clark Mathis
- Theme music composer: Mark Snow

Production
- Producers: Tim Daly and Stephen Burleigh

Original release
- Release: 2004

Bereft is a 2004 television film written by Peter Ferland and directed by Tim Daly and J. Clark Mathis. Bereft is the first film Daly directed. It stars Vinessa Shaw, Michael C. Hall, Tim Blake Nelson, Marsha Mason, and Edward Herrmann. Set in Vermont, Bereft tells the story of a young widow haunted by the memory of her dead husband, while trying to date again.

== Plot ==
A woman has a hard time embracing reality after a personal tragedy. Molly (Vinessa Shaw) is a young widow having a hard time putting her life back together after her husband's death. Molly obsesses over the leftover artifacts of his life, and she believes that his spirit walks the house they used to share, though her attempts to photograph the ghost are a failure. Molly supports herself by working at a photo shop, where the manager (Amy Van Nostrand) is convinced Molly needs to remarry, and isn't shy about dropping hints. But Molly seems to have built an emotional wall around herself until she meets an uncouth neighbor (Tim Blake Nelson) who lives in the neighborhood with his uncle. While she doesn't think much of him at first, Molly in time makes friends with the man, and under his spell, she develops a daring and impulsive streak.

== Cast ==
- Vinessa Shaw as Molly
- Tim Blake Nelson as Denis
- Tim Daly as Uncle "Happy"
- Amy Van Nostrand as Jodi
- Edward Herrmann as Lloyd
- Sam Daly as Kenny
- Patrick Burleigh as Joel
- Marsha Mason as Helen
- Ari Graynor as Louise
- Michael C. Hall as Jonathan
