= Gregory Morton (actor) =

American film, radio, stage and television actor

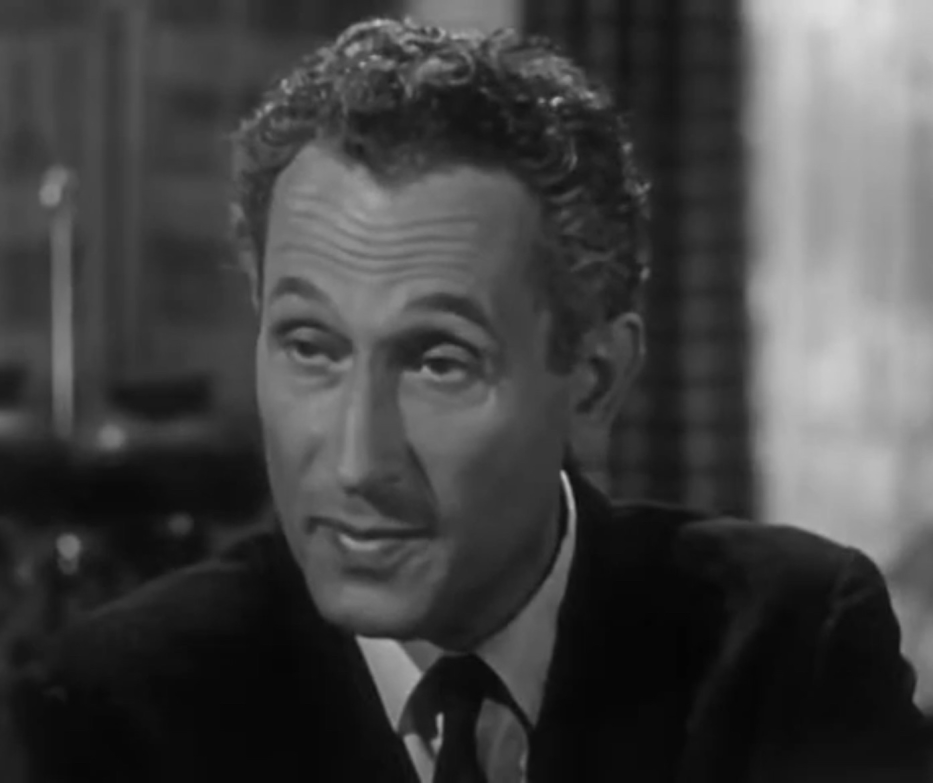
- Morton in Man with a Camera, 1959
- Born: Gregory Kossoff; November 28, 1911; New York, U.S.
- Died: January 28, 1986 (aged 74); Los Angeles, California, U.S.
- Occupations: Film, radio, stage and television actor
- Spouse: Enid Morton
- Children: 3

Gregory Kossoff (November 28, 1911 – January 28, 1986) was an American film, radio, stage and television actor. He was known for playing Walter Williams in the final season of the American medical drama television series Ben Casey.

== Life and career ==
Morton was born in New York, the son of Moris and Ida Kosoff. He began his stage career in 1940, appearing in the stage play The Devil Is A Good Man. He appeared in such other plays as Romeo and Juliet, Now I Lay Me Down to Sleep, Who Was That Lady I Saw You With?, Montserrat and War President. During his stage career, he performed in radio, and served in the United States Air Force during World War II. He then began his screen career in 1950, appearing in the NBC anthology drama television series Armstrong Circle Theatre. The next year, he appeared in the television programs Danger and Lights Out.

Later in his career, in 1965, Morton starred as Walter Williams in the final season of the ABC medical drama television series Ben Casey, starring along with Vince Edwards, Harry Landers, Jeanne Bates and Franchot Tone. After the series ended in 1966, he played the recurring role of Mr. Wainwright in the ABC soap opera television series Peyton Place, and the recurring role of Enzo Martelli in the NBC sitcom television series Hazel. He guest-starred in numerous television programs including Perry Mason, Get Smart, The Twilight Zone, The Wild Wild West, The Man from U.N.C.L.E, Death Valley Days, 77 Sunset Strip, Man with a Camera, Peter Gunn, Voyage to the Bottom of the Sea and The Time Tunnel. He also appeared in films such as The Mephisto Waltz, The Vagabond King, Counterpoint, Bye Bye Birdie, The Fiend Who Walked the West and The Flight That Disappeared.

Morton retired from acting in 1973, last appearing in the film The Adulteress.

== Death ==
Morton died on January 28, 1986, in Los Angeles, California, at the age of 74.
