= Sally Mayes =

American actress

Sally Mayes is an American actress and cabaret and concert singer.

== Biography ==
Born in Livingston, Texas, Mayes began her career as a rock and jazz singer in Houston. She attended the University of Houston.

She made her Broadway debut in April 1989 as Winona Shook in Cy Coleman's Welcome to the Club, for which she won a 1989 Theatre World Award (outstanding debut performance on- or off-Broadway).

This was followed by her appearance in the original Off-Broadway production of Richard Maltby, Jr. and David Shire's Closer Than Ever at the Cherry Lane Theatre. A critical success, the show ran for 312 performances and a CD recording was made on the RCA Victor label.

Mayes next appeared as Ilona Ritter in a revival of Jerry Bock's She Loves Me at the Roundabout Theatre in 1993. The production moved to the Brooks Atkinson Theatre on Broadway the following year, and Mayes garnered Tony and Drama Desk Award nominations for her performance.

After She Loves Me closed in June 1994, Mayes appeared as Brunnhilde in Jim Luigs's Das Barbecu at the Minetta Lane Theatre the following Fall.

In 1995 she appeared as Mrs. MacAfee in the television movie version of Bye Bye Birdie with Jason Alexander, Vanessa L. Williams, Marc Kudisch, and Chynna Phillips. The following year she played a small role in Harold Becker's film City Hall.

In 1997 she appeared at the Queens Theatre in the Park in a production of Stephen Sondheim's Marry Me A Little.

In 2000 Mayes appeared Off-Broadway as Keely in James Hindman's critically acclaimed musical Pete 'n' Keely. For her performance she was nominated for a Drama Desk Award for Outstanding Actress in a Musical. That same year she appeared in a small role in the film Double Parked.

In 2001 she returned to the Queens Theatre in the Park to appear in the play Decade. She also appeared in the musical revue The Broadway Musicals of 1943 at Town Hall.

She toured the United States in a production of Claudia Shear's and James Lapine's Dirty Blonde, and appeared on Sex and the City in the episode Coulda, Woulda, Shoulda. In 2002 she guest starred on Law & Order: Criminal Intent as Brenda in the episode Crazy. In 2003 she returned to Broadway as Aunt Corene in the musical Urban Cowboy, earning a third Drama Desk Award nomination. In 2005 she appeared in the ensemble of the film The Producers.

When Mayes isn't working as an actress, she maintains a busy schedule as a concert and cabaret singer in New York City. Stephen Holden of The New York Times wrote in a 2001 review:

"There is hardly a cabaret performer in New York who couldn't learn something from Sally Mayes. The plucky platinum-haired singer and actress embodies a hard-shelled professionalism that is too often missing from the nightclub stage. Alternately sparkly and brassy, and exuding a determined can-do energy, Ms. Mayes often suggests a contemporary cabaret descendant of Ginger Rogers."

== Stage ==
Year	Title	Role	Venue	Ref.
1989	Welcome to the Club	Winona Shook	Broadway, Music Box Theatre	
1989	Closer Than Ever	Performer	Off-Broadway, Cherry Lane Theatre	
1993	She Loves Me	Ilona Ritter	Broadway, Criterion Center Stage Right	
1994	Das Barbecu	Brunnhilde/et al	Off-Broadway, Minetta Lane Theatre	
2000	Pete 'n' Keely	Keely	Off-Broadway, John Houseman Theatre	
2003	Urban Cowboy	Aunt Corene	Broadway, Broadhurst Theatre	
2005	Steel Magnolias	Truvy	Broadway, Lyceum Theatre	
2011	Play It Cool	Performer	Off-Broadway, Acorn Theatre	

== Awards and nominations ==
Year	Award	Category	Work	Result	Ref.
1989	Theatre World Awards		Welcome to the World	Won	
1990	Outer Critics Circle Awards	Best Actress in a Musical	Closer Than Ever	Nominated	
1991	Helen Hayes Awards	Outstanding Lead Actress, Non-Resident Production	Closer Than Ever	Nominated	
1994	Tony Awards	Best Featured Actress in a Musical	She Loves Me	Nominated	
1994	Drama Desk Awards	Outstanding Featured Actress in a Musical	She Loves Me	Nominated	
2000	Drama Desk Awards	Outstanding Actress in a Musical	Pete 'n' Keely	Won	
2003	Drama Desk Awards	Outstanding Featured Actress in a Musical	Urban Cowboy	Won	
