= Seven Girlfriends =

- DVD cover
- Directed by: Paul Lazarus
- Written by: Paul Lazarus; Stephen Gregg
- Produced by: George Conda; J. Todd Harris; Paul Lazarus; Steve Lazarus; Barry Opper; Tom Traub; Amy Van Nostrand
- Starring: Tim Daly; Laura Leighton; Mimi Rogers; Olivia d'Abo; Melora Hardin; Jami Gertz; Katy Selverstone; Elizabeth Peña; Arye Gross
- Cinematography: Don E. FauntLeRoy
- Edited by: Ed Marx
- Music by: Christopher Tyng
- Release date: April 21, 2000
- Country: United States
- Language: English

Seven Girlfriends is a 1999 romantic comedy film directed by Paul Lazarus and starring Tim Daly.

== Plot ==
Ladies man, Jesse, impulsively proposes to his girlfriend after hearing that one of his exes has died. After being rejected, Jesse asks all of his ex-girlfriends why their relationship ended.

== Cast ==
- Tim Daly as Jesse Campbell
- Laura Leighton as Anabeth
- Mimi Rogers as Marie
- Olivia d'Abo as Hannah
- Melora Hardin as Laura
- Jami Gertz as Lisa
- Katy Selverstone as Peri
- Elizabeth Peña as Martha
- Arye Gross as Roman

== Release ==
=== Critical response ===
On Rotten Tomatoes, the film has a 50% critics' rating based on 6 reviews.

Dennis Harvey of Variety wrote "It’s a lightweight date movie best suited to living-room viewing."

=== Home media ===
The film was released on DVD February 13, 2001.
