= PoliWood =

2009 film

- Directed by: Barry Levinson
- Produced by: Tim Daly; Robin Bronk; Robert E. Baruc; Jason Sosonoff
- Cinematography: Aengus James; Adam Jandrup
- Edited by: Aaron Yanes
- Distributed by: Screen Media Films
- Release date: May 1, 2009 (Tribeca Film Festival)
- Running time: 90 minutes
- Country: United States
- Language: English

PoliWood is a 2009 American documentary film directed by Barry Levinson and produced by Tim Daly, Robin Bronk and Robert E. Baruc.

== Synopsis ==
The Democratic and Republican National Conventions held in 2008 during the United States presidential election that year are examined in depth in PoliWood, which features interviews with well-known Hollywood celebrities like Susan Sarandon and Anne Hathaway.

== Interviewees ==
- Richard Abramowitz
- Stephen Baldwin
- Annette Bening
- Ellen Burstyn
- Rachael Leigh Cook
- Bradley Cooper
- David Crosby
- Alan Cumming
- Tim Daly
- Charlie Daniels
- Robert Davi
- Dana Delany
- Giancarlo Esposito
- Tom Fontana
- Danny Glover
- Anne Hathaway
- Spike Lee
- Blanche Lincoln
- Josh Lucas
- Frank Luntz
- Matthew Modine
- Tom Morello
- Lawrence O'Donnell
- David Paterson
- Gloria Reuben
- Susan Sarandon
- Richard Schiff
- Ron Silver
- Arlen Specter
- Sting
- Lynn Whitfield
- will.i.am
- Zooey Deschanel

== Debuts and receptions ==
PoliWood had its premiere at the Tribeca Film Festival on May 1, 2009 and continued screening through various film festivals including the 2009 Maryland Film Festival, Austin Film Festival, Denver Starz Film Festival, the 2010 Sedona Film Festival and Artivist Film Festival. It also got a special screening at the Paley Center for Media in New York on October 29, 2009. The event was attended by director Barry Levinson and producers. It had its TV premiere November 2, 2009 on Showtime.
