= Marc Kudisch =

American stage actor (born 1966)

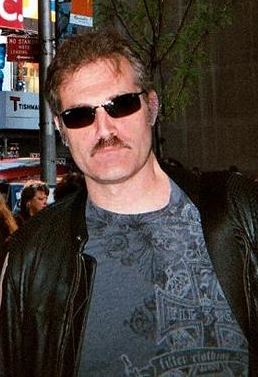
- Kudisch in 2009
- Born: September 22, 1966 (age 60); Hackensack, New Jersey, U.S.
- Education: Florida Atlantic University (BFA)
- Occupation: Actor
- Years active: 1990–present
- Spouse: Shannon Lewis
- Website: www.marckudisch.net

Marc Kudisch (born September 22, 1966) is an American stage actor, who is best known for his musical theatre roles on Broadway.

== Early life and education ==
Kudisch was born in Hackensack, New Jersey, the son of Florence and Raymond Kudisch. His family is Jewish. He grew up in Plantation, Florida. He enrolled at Florida Atlantic University to study political science and switched to theatre. After receiving his degree, Kudisch went to New York City and was cast as Conrad Birdie in the Barry Weissler-produced national tour of Bye Bye Birdie with Tommy Tune and Ann Reinking. Kudisch later starred in a television version of the Broadway musical along with Jason Alexander and Vanessa Williams.

== Career ==
Kudisch's Broadway credits include Chitty Chitty Bang Bang (Baron Bomburst), Assassins (The Proprietor), Thoroughly Modern Millie (Trevor Graydon), Finding Neverland (Charles Frohman/Captain Hook), Girl from the North Country (Mr. Burke), Floyd Collins (Lee Collins), Bells Are Ringing (Jeff Moss), Michael John LaChiusa's The Wild Party at the Public Theater (Jackie), The Scarlet Pimpernel (Chauvelin), High Society (George Kittredge), Disney's Beauty and the Beast (Gaston), and Andrew Lloyd Webber's Joseph and the Amazing Technicolor Dreamcoat (Reuben). He has been nominated for the Tony Award for Best Featured Actor in a Musical for his roles in Thoroughly Modern Millie (2002), Chitty Chitty Bang Bang (2005) and 9 to 5 (2009), as well as the Outer Critics Circle Award and the Drama Desk Award.

Once more playing a villain, Kudisch starred in the Roundabout Theatre Company revival of The Apple Tree with his former fiancee, Kristin Chenoweth, as Eve and Brian d'Arcy James as Adam. In late 2008, Kudisch joined Allison Janney, Megan Hilty and Stephanie J. Block in the new musical, 9 to 5. Based on the film of the same name, the production was directed by Joe Mantello and had its pre-Broadway run at the Ahmanson Theatre in Los Angeles beginning September 21, 2008. The musical began preview performances on Broadway at the Marquis Theatre on April 7, 2009 with an official opening on April 30, 2009. Kudisch played sexist, egotistical boss Franklin Hart Jr., a part played by Dabney Coleman. Dolly Parton, who appeared in the original film, wrote the music and lyrics for the new musical. The show closed on September 6, 2009.

He starred as Slick Follicle in the City Centers Encores! production of Girl Crazy, which ran Nov. 19 – 22, 2009. Kudisch appeared off-Broadway in the critically acclaimed improvisational comedy show Noo Yawk Tawk, as well as The Thing About Men, See What I Wanna See (Public Theater), and in the Lucille Lortel Award nominated The Glorious Ones. In 1987 he appeared in the murder mystery/party game Tamara: The Living Movie at New York City's Armory. He appeared in the Off-Broadway musical Minister's Wife. The show's music was by Josh Schmidt, lyrics by Jan Tranen, and a book by Austin Pendleton and it was based on Candida by George Bernard Shaw. He also performed in a one-man show beginning in July 2011 entitled What Makes Me Tick.

Kudisch has also appeared in Stephen Sondheim's A Little Night Music as Count Carl-Magnus Malcolm opposite Juliet Stevenson and Jeremy Irons in a 2003 production at the New York City Opera, and with Victor Garber and Judith Ivey in a 2004 staging by the Los Angeles Opera. In regional theatre, he originated the role of Vincent van Gogh in The Highest Yellow, also by LaChiusa. In June 2007, he starred as Darryl van Horne in the American premiere of The Witches of Eastwick at the Signature Theatre in Arlington, Virginia.

On television, in addition to a stint on All My Children, Kudisch played a kinky lawyer on Sex and the City and was also the spokesperson for Toyota in the U.S. for several years. He appeared on the NBC show Smash as Darryl Zanuck.

== Personal life ==
In the early 90s, Kudisch became a baritone after working with a new vocal coach. Unlike many operatic singers, he trained in opera after college.

Kudisch and Kristin Chenoweth met when she moved to New York. They were engaged from 1998 to 2001. Kudisch began a relationship in 2003 with Broadway dancer and choreographer Shannon Lewis, with the couple marrying in 2011. In 2016, the two mounted a production of Joseph and the Amazing Technicolor Dreamcoat for 3D Theatricals, with Marc directing and Shannon choreographing.

== Credits ==
=== Theatre ===
Year(s)	Production	Role	Notes
1988	A Hell of a Town	Sandy	
1990–1991	Bye Bye Birdie	Conrad Birdie	US Tour
1993–1994	Joseph and the Amazing Technicolor Dreamcoat	Reuben, u/s Pharaoh	Broadway
1995–1997	Beauty and the Beast	Gaston	Broadway
1998	High Society	George Kittredge	Broadway
1999-2000	The Scarlet Pimpernel	Chauvelin	Broadway
2000	The Wild Party	Jackie	Broadway
2000–2001	The Prince and the Pauper	Miles Hendon	Starlight Theatre
2001	Bells Are Ringing	Jeff	Broadway
2002	Earth Girls Are Easy	Dr. Ted Gallagher	
2002-2003	Thoroughly Modern Millie	Trevor Graydon	Broadway
2002	A Little Night Music	Count Carl-Magnus Malcolm	Ravinia Festival
2003	A Little Night Music	Count Carl-Magnus Malcolm	New York City Opera
2003	No Strings	Mike Robinson	Encores! / Off-Broadway
2003	The Thing About Men	Tom	Off-Broadway
2004	Assassins	The Proprietor	Broadway
2004	A Little Night Music	Count Carl-Magnus Malcolm	Los Angeles Opera
2004	The Highest Yellow	Vincent van Gogh	Signature Theatre
2005	Chitty Chitty Bang Bang	Baron Bomburst	Broadway
2005	See What I Wanna See	Morito/Husband/CPA	Off-Broadway
2005	A Wonderful Life	Sam Wainwright	Broadway Benefit Concert
2006	Summer and Smoke	John Buchanan Jr.	Hartford Stage
2006	Young Frankenstein	Inspector Kemp	Workshop
2006-2007	The Apple Tree	Snake / Balladeer / Narrator	Broadway
2007	The Pirates of Penzance	The Pirate King	New York City Opera
2007	The Witches of Eastwick	Darryl Van Horne	Signature Theatre
2007	9 to 5	Franklin Hart, Jr.	Reading & Workshop
2007-2008	The Glorious Ones	Flaminio Scala	Off-Broadway
2008	Camelot	Sir Lionel	New York Philharmonic Concert
2008	9 to 5	Franklin Hart, Jr.	Ahmanson Theatre
2009	A Little Night Music	Count Carl-Magnus Malcolm	Broadway Concert
2009	9 to 5	Franklin Hart, Jr.	Broadway
2009	Bonnie & Clyde	Buck Barrow	Workshop
2011	On a Clear Day You Can See Forever	Dr. Mark Bruckner	Workshop
2011	A Minister's Wife	Reverend James Morell	Off-Broadway
2011	The Unsinkable Molly Brown	Johnny "Leadville" Brown	Workshop
2011	The Blue Flower	Max	Off-Broadway
2012	Tartuffe	Tartuffe	Westport Country Playhouse
2012	Assassins	The Proprietor	Broadway Reunion Concert
2013	Hamlet	Claudius/Ghost	Yale Repertory Theatre
2013	Somewhere in Time	William Robinson	Portland Center Stage
2013	Kiss Me, Kate	Fred Graham / Petruchio	Boston Concert
2014	Hand to God	Pastor Greg	Off-Broadway
2014	The Wayside Motor Inn	Vince	Signature Theatre
2015	Hand to God	Pastor Greg	Broadway
2016	Finding Neverland	Charles Frohman / Captain Hook	Broadway
2016	Wonderful Town	Robert Baker	Los Angeles Opera
2017	The Unsinkable Molly Brown	Johnny "Leadville" Brown	The Muny
2017	Man of La Mancha	Don Quixote / Miguel de Cervantes	Merkin Hall
2018	Thoroughly Modern Millie	Trevor Graydon	Broadway Reunion Concert
2018	Girl from the North Country	Mr. Burke	Off-Broadway
2019	The Great Society	Richard J. Daley/Dr. James Z. Appel/General	Broadway
2020-2022	Girl from the North Country	Mr. Burke	Broadway
2023	The Frogs	Herakles	Lincoln Center Concert
2024	Follies	Benjamin Stone	Carnegie Hall
2025	Floyd Collins	Lee Collins	Broadway
2026	Jane Eyre	Richard Mason / Mr. Brocklehurst	Lincoln Center Concert

Discography

- Z: The Masked Musical 1998 Concept Cast
- The Wild Party as Jackie 2000 Original Cast
- Thoroughly Modern Millie 2002 Original Cast
- Anna Karenina 2003 Original Broadway Cast
- The Thing About Men 2004 Original Off-Broadway Cast
- The Man Who Would Be King 2004 Studio Cast
- Assassins 2004 Revival Cast
- See What I Wanna See 2005 Off-Broadway Original Cast
- The Glorious Ones 2007 Off-Broadway Original Cast
- 9 to 5 2009 Original Cast
- James and the Giant Peach 2015 World Premiere Cast

Film

- Unsane (2018) as Bank Manager
- Late Night (2019) as Billy Kastner

Television

- Bye Bye Birdie (1995) as Conrad Birdie
- Sex and the City (1999) as Harrison
- All My Children (2005) as Steve Lasko
- One Life to Live (2005) as Steve Lasko
- As the World Turns (2006–2008) as Judge Burke / Radio Announcer
- Submissions Only (2012) as Joe Flunt
- Blue Bloods (2012) as Terry Longacre
- Smash (2012) as himself, playing Darryl F. Zanuck in Bombshell!
- Gossip Girl (2012) as Benedict Tate
- Person of Interest (2014) as Businessman
- Unforgettable (2014) as Donovan Gates
- House of Cards (2015–2018) as Henry Mitchell
- Limitless (2016) as Gordon Cooker
- Mindhunter (2017) as Roger Wade, a Fredericksburg elementary school principal
- Billions (2017–2019) as Dr. Gus, a therapist at Axe Capital
- The Tick (2019) as Agent Tyrannosaurus Rathbone
- The Blacklist (2019) as Dr. Adrian McCaffrey
- Condor (2020) as Jay Atwood
- The Good Fight (2021) as Mr. Rottenberg
- The Equalizer (2021) as Congressman Gates
- Law & Order: Organized Crime (2023) as Robert Petrillo

== Awards and nominations ==
Year	Award	Category	Work	Result
2002	Tony Award	Best Performance by a Featured Actor in a Musical	Thoroughly Modern Millie	Nominated
2002	Drama Desk Award	Outstanding Featured Actor in a Musical	Thoroughly Modern Millie	Nominated
2002	Outer Critics Circle Award	Outstanding Featured Actor in a Musical	Thoroughly Modern Millie	Nominated
2004	Drama Desk Award	Outstanding Featured Actor in a Musical	Assassins	Nominated
2005	Tony Award	Best Performance by a Featured Actor in a Musical	Chitty Chitty Bang Bang	Nominated
2005	Outer Critics Circle Award	Outstanding Featured Actor in a Musical	Chitty Chitty Bang Bang	Nominated
2006	Drama Desk Award	Outstanding Actor in a Play	See What I Wanna See	Nominated
2007	Broadway.com Audience Awards	Favorite Featured Actor in a Broadway Musical	The Apple Tree	Nominated
2008	Helen Hayes Award	Outstanding Lead Actor in a Resident Musical	The Witches of Eastwick	Won
2009	Tony Award	Best Performance by a Featured Actor in a Musical	9 to 5	Nominated
2009	Drama Desk Award	Outstanding Featured Actor in a Musical	9 to 5	Nominated
2015	Drama Desk Award	Outstanding Ensemble Performance	The Wayside Motor Inn	Won
