= Vincent J. Cardinal =

American dramatist (born 1960)

Vincent J. Cardinal (born August 9, 1960 in Ashtabula, Ohio) is an American playwright and director. He has written The Colorado Catechism and directed Queens Blvd. and Steve Hayes' Hollywood Reunion. Cardinal is the former chair of the Department of Musical Theatre at the University of Michigan School of Music, Theatre & Dance. He is a graduate of Yale School of Drama.
