= Put On a Happy Face (song) =

1960 song from the stage musical Bye Bye Birdie

"Put on a Happy Face"

Song by Dick Van Dyke

from the album Bye Bye Birdie
- Released: May 2, 1960
- Recorded: April 24, 1960
- Studio: CBS 30th Street Studio, New York City
- Genre: Show tune
- Length: 3:18
- Label: Columbia
- Composer: Charles Strouse
- Lyricist: Lee Adams
- Producer: Goddard Lieberson

"Put on a Happy Face" is a popular song with lyrics by Lee Adams and music by Charles Strouse. It was introduced by Dick Van Dyke in the 1960 stage musical Bye Bye Birdie.
