= Execution of Justice =

Play written by Emily Mann

- Written by: Emily Mann
- Chorus: Uncalled Witnesses
- Characters: See text
- Subject: Moscone–Milk assassinations
- Genre: Docudrama; History
- Setting: San Francisco, 1978

Premiere
- Date: May 10, 1985
- Place: Arena Stage

Execution of Justice is an ensemble play by Emily Mann chronicling the case of Dan White, who assassinated San Francisco mayor George Moscone and openly gay city supervisor Harvey Milk in November 1978. The play was originally commissioned by the Eureka Theatre Company, but premiered at Arena Stage on May 10, 1985.

In the play, the trial itself is on trial in the court of theater, and is found guilty of a miscarriage of justice. In the actual trial, White was convicted only of a lesser charge of voluntary manslaughter, rather than two counts of first-degree murder; he was sentenced to less than eight years in prison. The dialogue mentions the urban legend that White's defense strategy was primarily the so-called "Twinkie defense"—painting his junk food consumption as a significant factor in his capacity for murder.

The play's Broadway premiere was on March 13, 1986. John Spencer played the role of Dan White. Also among the cast were Wesley Snipes, Stanley Tucci, Mary McDonnell, and Earle Hyman. The set was designed by Ming Cho Lee, costumes by Jennifer von Mayrhauser, lighting by Pat Collins.

== Awards ==
Execution of Justice won the HBO New Plays USA award, the Helen Hayes Award, the Bay Area Critics Circle Award. It was nominated for a Drama Desk and Outer Critics Circle Award.

== Adaptations ==
In 1999, Showtime Networks aired a film adaptation of the play, directed by Leon Ichaso and adapted by screenwriter Michael Butler. In 2000, the film won the GLAAD Media Award for Outstanding TV Movie or Limited Series.

== Summary ==
The play is set in the US city of San Francisco in the year 1978. The set is a bare stage with at least one white screen overhead.

To the live performance on-stage, it adds video, prerecorded voices, and music. Throughout the performance, the feed from a video camera pointed at the stage is projected onto large screens. The drag nun, an AIDS activist called Sister Boom Boom, is the voice of conscience who represents human rights for all marginalized groups.

The dialogue is based on trial transcripts, reportage, and interviews.

=== Act I: Murder ===
This act is beginning the trial of Daniel James White, who has assassinated Harvey Milk, the Supervisor of the City and County of San Francisco, California, and George R. Moscone, the Mayor of the City and County of San Francisco, California. The Prosecution and Defense choose a jury, and then present the facts of what has occurred, such as White resigning from his position as the Supervisor of District 8 of San Francisco, and the discussion of his intent to possibly withdraw that resignation. They discuss White's background, where he grew up in San Francisco, served in Vietnam, and was a police officer and fireman in San Francisco. They then discuss the wounds of the victims, and question the witnesses to the shooting of Milk and Moscone. White explains his side of the story, and the end of the act is Dan White, his wife Mary Ann, and the Jurors sobbing. Court then takes a recess.

=== Act II: In Defense of Murder ===
This begins with the Prosecution questioning Falzon and his relationship to Dan White. Then the Defense brings in Freitas, Sherrant, and Frediani, to discuss his character and their relationships with him in the past. Then there is a psychiatric defense, and then questioning of his wife, Mary Ann, and her perspective. After all final statements and deliberation of the jury, the court announces Mr. White is sentenced to seven years and eight months, the maximum sentence for two counts of voluntary manslaughter. In the last line of the play, Dan White says: "I was always just a lonely vote on the board. I was just trying to do a good job for the city".

== Characters ==
Main characters
- Dan White (man on trial for murder of George R. Moscone and Harvey Milk)
- Mary Ann White (wife of Dan White)
- Cop
- Sister Boom Boom (Nun in Drag)

Chorus of Uncalled Witnesses
- Jim Denman (White's Jailer)
- Young Mother
- Milk's Friend
- Gwenn Craig (Vice President of Harvey Milk Democratic Club)
- Harry Britt (City Supervisor)
- Joseph Freitas (D.A.)
- Mourner

Trial Characters
- The Court
- Court Clerk
- Douglas Schmidt (Defense Attorney)
- Thomas F. Norman (Prosecuting Attorney)
- Joanna Lu (TV Reporter)
- Prospective Jurors
- Juror #3/Foreman Bailiff

Witnesses for the People
- Coroner Stephens
- Rudy Nothenberg (Deputy Mayor, Moscone's Friend)
- Barabara Taylor (Reporter)
- Officer Byrne (Department of Records)
- William Melia (Civil Engineer)
- Cyr Copertini (Secretary to Mayor)
- Carl Henry Carlson (Aide to Harvey Milk)
- Richard Pabich (Assistant to Harvey Milk)
- Frank Falzon (Inspector, Homicide)
- Edward Erdelatz (Inspector)

Witnesses for the Defense
- Denise Apcar (Aide to White)
- Sherratt (Fire Chief)
- Frediani (Fireman)
- Sullivan (Police Officer)
- Lee Dolson (City Supervisor)

Psychiatrists
- Dr. Jones
- Dr. Solomon
- Dr. Blinder
- Dr. Lunde
- Dr. Delman

In Rebuttal for the People
- Carol Ruth Silver (City Supervisor)
- Dr. Levy (Psychiatrist)
- Riot Police
- Action Cameraman
