= List of Broadway musicals stars =

Following is a list of notable actors and actresses from Broadway musicals:

== A ==
- F. Murray Abraham
- Edie Adams
- Nick Adams
- Uzo Aduba
- Kevin Del Aguila
- Krystina Alabado
- Anna Maria Alberghetti
- Eddie Albert
- Jack Albertson
- Alan Alda
- Robert Alda
- Tom Aldredge
- Graham Alexander
- Jason Alexander
- Debbie Allen
- Elizabeth Allen
- Fred Allen
- Jonelle Allen
- Rae Allen
- Sasha Allen
- June Allyson
- Christy Altomare
- Don Ameche
- Christine Andreas
- Julie Andrews
- Marc Anthony
- Christina Applegate
- Sebastian Arcelus
- Eve Arden
- Michael Arden
- Adam Arkin
- Desi Arnaz
- Lucie Arnaz
- Bea Arthur
- Annaleigh Ashford
- Brooks Ashmanskas
- Adele Astaire
- Fred Astaire
- Skylar Astin
- Ashlie Atkinson
- René Auberjonois
- Hank Azaria
- Tony Azito

== B ==
=== Ba–Bm ===
- Obba Babatundé
- Lauren Bacall
- Pearl Bailey
- Dylan Baker
- David Bozza
- Josephine Baker
- Mark Baker
- Scott Bakula
- Kate Baldwin
- Lucille Ball
- Michael Ball
- Kaye Ballard
- Colleen Ballinger
- Christine Baranski
- Adrienne Barbeau
- Sara Bareilles
- Brent Barrett
- Barbara Barrie
- Fantasia Barrino
- John Barrowman
- Gene Barry
- Roger Bart
- Peter Bartlett
- Rob Bartlett
- Lance Bass
- Hinton Battle
- Anne Baxter
- Nora Bayes
- Gary Beach
- Shoshana Bean
- Laurie Beechman
- Harry Belafonte
- Bertha Belmore
- Laura Benanti
- William Bendix
- Jack Benny
- Melissa Benoist
- Jodi Benson
- Robby Benson
- Polly Bergen
- Milton Berle
- Herschel Bernardi
- Michael Berresse
- Ken Berry
- Sarah Uriarte Berry
- Isabel Bigley
- Theodore Bikel
- Alexandra Billings
- Vivian Blaine
- Tammy Blanchard
- Jules Bledsoe
- Corbin Bleu
- Heidi Blickenstaff
- Stephanie J. Block
- Eric Blore
- Larry Blyden

=== Bn–Bz ===
- Walter Bobbie
- Alfie Boe
- Stephen Bogardus
- Sierra Boggess
- Ray Bolger
- Sheila Bond
- Shirley Booth
- Irene Bordoni
- Christian Borle
- Philip Bosco
- Tom Bosley
- Barry Bostwick
- Simon Bowman
- Phillip Boykin
- Eddie Bracken
- Toni Braxton
- Lisa Brescia
- Eileen Brennan
- Donald Brian
- Fanny Brice
- Beau Bridges
- Dee Dee Bridgewater
- Alex Brightman
- Sarah Brightman
- Helen Broderick
- Matthew Broderick
- Geraldine Brooks
- Louise Brooks
- Anne Brown
- Blair Brown
- Georgia Brown
- Jason Robert Brown
- Johnny Brown
- Russ Brown
- Tally Brown
- Roscoe Lee Browne
- Susan Browning
- Carol Bruce
- Yul Brynner
- John W. Bubbles
- Jack Buchanan
- Betty Buckley
- Gregg Burge
- Tituss Burgess
- Laura Bell Bundy
- Billie Burke
- Delta Burke
- Carol Burnett
- David Burns
- Karla Burns
- Raymond Burr
- Danny Burstein
- Kate Burton
- Richard Burton
- Meg Bussert
- Kerry Butler
- Norbert Leo Butz

== C ==
=== Ca–Cm ===
- Sid Caesar
- James Cagney
- L. Scott Caldwell
- Michael Callan
- Ann Hampton Callaway
- Liz Callaway
- Cab Calloway
- Eduardo Cansino, Sr.
- Mario Cantone
- David Cantor
- Eddie Cantor
- Virginia Capers
- Irene Cara
- Len Cariou
- Kitty Carlisle
- Jeffrey Carlson
- Carolee Carmello
- Reeve Carney
- Carleton Carpenter
- Thelma Carpenter
- Diahann Carroll
- Pat Carroll
- Aaron Carter
- Dixie Carter
- Jack Carter
- Nell Carter
- Ralph Carter
- Emma Carus
- Sophia Anne Caruso
- Max Casella
- Peggy Cass
- David Cassidy
- Jack Cassidy
- Patrick Cassidy
- Shaun Cassidy
- Roy Castle
- Vernon and Irene Castle
- Mary Jo Catlett
- Matt Cavenaugh
- Jonathan Stuart Cerullo
- Michael Cerveris
- George Chakiris
- Richard Chamberlain
- Kevin Chamberlin
- Gower Champion
- Marge Champion
- Adam Chanler-Berat
- Carol Channing
- Stockard Channing
- Sydney Chaplin
- Cyd Charisse
- Will Chase
- Kristin Chenoweth
- Maurice Chevalier
- Sandra Church
- Wayne Cilento
- Ina Claire
- Petula Clark
- Victoria Clark
- Katie Rose Clarke
- Jan Clayton
- Lewis Cleale
- Glenn Close
- Kit Connor

=== Cn–Cz ===
- Imogene Coca
- James Coco
- Jennifer Cody
- George M. Cohan
- Patti Cohenour
- Jenn Colella
- Charles Coles
- Toni Collette
- Dorothy Collins
- José Collins
- Betty Comden
- Bert Convy
- Jeff Conaway
- Shirl Conway
- Barbara Cook
- Carole Cook
- Chuck Cooper
- Marilyn Cooper
- Robert Coote
- Leanne Cope
- Nick Cordero
- Jesse Corti
- Noël Coward
- Deborah Cox
- Veanne Cox
- Ben Crawford
- Michael Crawford
- Luther Creek
- Gavin Creel
- Darren Criss
- Anthony Crivello
- Ann Crumb
- Max Crumm
- Wilson Cruz
- John Cullum
- Alan Cumming
- Robert Cummings
- Michael Cumpsty
- Tim Curry
- Keene Curtis

== D ==
- Stephanie D'Abruzzo
- Charlotte d'Amboise
- Jacques d'Amboise
- Fifi D'Orsay
- Janet Dacal
- Dan Dailey
- Jim Dale
- Tyne Daly
- Jennifer Damiano
- Stuart Damon
- Lili Damita
- Dorothy Dandridge
- Merle Dandridge
- Jason Danieley
- Billy Daniels
- Blythe Danner
- Severn Darden
- Howard Da Silva
- Mara Davi
- Keith David
- John Davidson
- Erin Davie
- Marion Davies
- Bette Davis
- Clifton Davis
- Elizabeth A. Davis
- Frenchie Davis
- Ossie Davis
- Sammy Davis Jr.
- Rachel deBenedet
- Ariana DeBose
- Yvonne De Carlo
- Billy De Wolfe
- Diana DeGarmo
- Gloria DeHaven
- Robin de Jesús
- Lea DeLaria
- Judi Dench
- Cleavant Derricks
- Andre DeShields
- Gaby Deslys
- Loretta Devine
- Karla DeVito
- Chris Diamantopoulos
- Joan Diener
- Daveed Diggs
- Taye Diggs
- Phyllis Diller
- Denny Dillon
- Lee Dixon
- Marcie Dodd
- Dan Domenech
- Colman Domingo
- Stephen Douglass
- Bruce Dow
- Eddie Dowling
- Matt Doyle
- Alfred Drake
- Paul Draper
- Marie Dressler
- Laura Dreyfuss
- Haylie Duff
- Isadora Duncan
- Sandy Duncan
- Irene Dunne
- Christopher Durang
- Jimmy Durante
- Nancy Dussault
- Ronnie Dyson

== E ==
- Daisy Eagan
- Sheena Easton
- Christine Ebersole
- Buddy Ebsen
- Nelson Eddy
- Gregg Edelman
- Linda Eder
- Susan Egan
- Taina Elg
- Patricia Elliott
- Kerry Ellis
- Julian Eltinge
- Georgia Engel
- Cynthia Erivo
- Melissa Errico
- Leon Errol
- Raúl Esparza
- Michael Esper
- Eden Espinosa
- Ruth Etting
- Rob Evan
- Harvey Evans
- Maurice Evans
- Rex Everhart

== F ==
- Mary Faber
- Nanette Fabray
- Megan Fairchild
- Robert Fairchild
- Mike Faist
- Lola Falana
- Joey Fatone
- Alice Faye
- Joey Faye
- Michael Feinstein
- Tovah Feldshuh
- Edith Fellows
- Jesse Tyler Ferguson
- José Ferrer
- W.C. Fields
- Harvey Fierstein
- Katie Finneran
- Carrie Fisher
- Christopher Fitzgerald
- Michael Flatley
- Dan Fogler
- Santino Fontana
- Bob Fosse
- Hunter Foster
- Sutton Foster
- Beth Fowler
- Eddie Foy
- Eddie Foy Jr.
- Sergio Franchi
- Stacy Francis
- Bonnie Franklin
- Hadley Fraser
- William Frawley
- Jonathan Freeman
- Morgan Freeman
- Maria Friedman
- Peter Friedman
- Jane Froman
- Penny Fuller

== G ==
- June Gable
- Eva Gabor
- Josh Gad
- Boyd Gaines
- Davis Gaines
- Helen Gallagher
- John Gallagher Jr.
- Peter Gallagher
- Jenn Gambatese
- Victor Garber
- Tess Gardella
- Judy Garland
- Betty Garrett
- Ana Gasteyer
- Dick Gautier
- William Gaxton
- Will Geer
- Drew Gehling
- Alexander Gemignani
- Stephen Geoffreys
- Florence Gerald
- Richard Gere
- Malcolm Gets
- Tamara Geva
- J. Harrison Ghee
- Alice Ghostley
- Debbie Gibson
- Virginia Gibson
- Kathie Lee Gifford
- Jack Gilford
- Anita Gillette
- Elizabeth Gillies
- Hermione Gingold
- Lillian Gish
- Jackie Gleason
- Joanna Gleason
- Kimiko Glenn
- Montego Glover
- Savion Glover
- Adam Godley
- Renée Elise Goldsberry
- Whoopi Goldberg
- Annie Golden
- Tony Goldwyn
- Eydie Gormé
- Louis Gossett Jr.
- Elliott Gould
- Robert Goulet
- Jason Graae
- Betty Grable
- Ilene Graff
- Randy Graff
- Todd Graff
- Lauren Graham
- Kelsey Grammer
- Ariana Grande
- Cary Grant
- Debbie Gravitte
- Dolores Gray
- Gilda Gray
- Tamyra Gray
- Kathryn Grayson
- Adolph Green
- Al Green
- Ellen Greene
- Julie Gregg
- Joel Grey
- David Alan Grier
- Andy Griffith
- Tammy Grimes
- Harry Groener
- Jonathan Groff
- Justin Guarini
- Robert Guillaume
- Laurence Guittard
- Jasmine Guy

== H ==
- Larry Haines
- Jack Haley
- Juanita Hall
- Lena Hall
- Michael C. Hall
- George Hamilton
- Carol Haney
- Christopher Hanke
- Ann Harada
- Ben Harney
- Barbara Harris
- Julie Harris
- Neil Patrick Harris
- Richard Harris
- Sam Harris
- Rex Harrison
- Jackee Harry
- Melissa Hart
- Grace Hartman
- Paul Hartman
- David Hasselhoff
- June Havoc
- Jill Haworth
- Richard Haydn
- Bill Hayes
- Sean Hayes
- Lillian Hayman
- Heather Headley
- George Hearn
- Joey Heatherton
- Ray Heatherton
- Anna Held
- Florence Henderson
- Marilu Henner
- Doug Henning
- Erika Henningsen
- Joshua Henry
- Ruthie Henshall
- Shuler Hensley
- Grey Henson
- Katharine Hepburn
- Wilson Jermaine Heredia
- Eileen Herlie
- David Hibbard
- Edward Hibbert
- Catherine Hickland
- Darryl Hickman
- Rodney Hicks
- Samantha Hill
- Megan Hilty
- Gregory Hines
- Maurice Hines
- Mimi Hines
- Douglas Hodge
- Christian Hoff
- Portland Hoffa
- Jackie Hoffman
- Hal Holbrook
- Ron Holgate
- Jennifer Holliday
- Judy Holliday
- Stanley Holloway
- Celeste Holm
- Libby Holman
- Robert Hooks
- Bob Hope
- Linda Hopkins
- DeWolf Hopper
- Hedda Hopper
- Lena Horne
- Dee Hoty
- Jayne Houdyshell
- Sally Ann Howes
- Jennifer Hudson
- Cady Huffman
- Rhetta Hughes
- Ron Husmann
- Betty Hutton
- Phyllis Hyman

== I ==
- James Monroe Iglehart
- George S. Irving
- Bill Irwin
- May Irwin
- Burl Ives
- Dana Ivey

== J ==
- Paul Jabara
- Hugh Jackman
- Cheyenne Jackson
- Christopher Jackson
- Ernestine Jackson
- Arielle Jacobs
- Scott Jacoby
- Brian d'Arcy James
- Nikki M. James
- Gregory Jbara
- Anne Jeffreys
- Daniel H. Jenkins
- Michael Jeter
- Glynis Johns
- Susan Johnson
- Van Johnson
- Bill Johnson
- Al Jolson
- Allan Jones
- Rachel Bay Jones
- Davy Jones
- Dean Jones
- Jasmine Cephas Jones
- Leilani Jones
- Shirley Jones
- Jeremy Jordan
- Joseph
- Raúl Juliá
- Adam Jacobs

== K ==
- Madeline Kahn
- Brad Kane
- Helen Kane
- Ramin Karimloo
- Andy Karl
- Maria Karnilova
- Patti Karr
- Kendra Kassebaum
- Kurt Kasznar
- Danny Kaye
- Judy Kaye
- Stubby Kaye
- Lainie Kazan
- Steve Kazee
- Isabel Keating
- Diane Keaton
- Lila Kedrova
- Howard Keel
- Ruby Keeler
- Andrew Keenan-Bolger
- Celia Keenan-Bolger
- Sally Kellerman
- Mike Kellin
- Gene Kelly
- Laura Michelle Kelly
- Patsy Kelly
- Pert Kelton
- Lauren Kennedy
- Anna Kendrick
- Larry Kert
- Michael Kidd
- Richard Kiley
- Randall Duk Kim
- Chad Kimball
- Charles Kimbrough
- Mabel King
- Caitlin Kinnunen
- Lisa Kirk
- Eartha Kitt
- Derek Klena
- Kevin Kline
- Jack Klugman
- Hildegard Knef
- Wayne Knight
- Ruth Kobart
- Nikos Kourkoulos
- Jane Krakowski
- Levi Kreis
- Leslie Kritzer
- Marc Kudisch
- Judy Kuhn

== L ==
- Patti LaBelle
- LaChanze
- Drew Lachey
- Bert Lahr
- Cleo Laine
- Christine Lakin
- Fernando Lamas
- Nathan Lane
- Harold Lang
- Angela Lansbury
- Leigh Ann Larkin
- John Larroquette
- Lisby Larson
- Dick Latessa
- Linda Lavin
- Carol Lawrence
- Gertrude Lawrence
- Sharon Lawrence
- Steve Lawrence
- Tamika Lawrence
- Twiggy Lawson
- Evelyn Laye
- Beth Leavel
- Baayork Lee
- Gavin Lee
- Gypsy Rose Lee
- Michele Lee
- Vivien Leigh
- Ute Lemper
- Lotte Lenya
- Hal Le Roy
- Telly Leung
- Sam Levene
- Caissie Levy
- Dawnn Lewis
- Jenifer Lewis
- Jerry Lewis
- Marcia Lewis
- Norm Lewis
- Vicki Lewis
- Winnie Lightner
- Beatrice Lillie
- Hal Linden
- Robert Lindsay
- Mark Linn-Baker
- Luba Lisa
- John Lithgow
- Cleavon Little
- Danny Lockin
- Avon Long
- Mario Lopez
- Priscilla Lopez
- Tilly Losch
- Taylor Louderman
- Dorothy Loudon
- Tina Louise
- Claire Luce
- Lorna Luft
- Rebecca Luker
- BarBara Luna
- Patti LuPone
- Robert LuPone
- Stephen Lynch

== M ==
=== Ma–Mh ===
- Jeanette MacDonald
- Erin Mackey
- Shirley MacLaine
- Fred MacMurray
- Gordon MacRae
- Brandon Maggart
- Natalia Makarova
- Mako
- Victoria Mallory
- Terrence Mann
- Patricia Marand
- Lesli Margherita
- Julienne Marie
- Constantine Maroulis
- Bianca Marroquín
- Howard Marsh
- Rob Marshall
- Andrea Martin
- Mary Martin
- Millicent Martin
- Ross Martin
- Virginia Martin
- The Marx Brothers
- Kyle Dean Massey
- Mary Elizabeth Mastrantonio
- Jessie Matthews
- Matt Mattox
- Victor Mature
- Alli Mauzey
- Jefferson Mays
- Marin Mazzie
- Andrea McArdle
- Chris McCarrell
- Isabelle McCalla
- Forrest McClendon
- Rob McClure
- Myron McCormick
- Joan McCracken
- Audra McDonald
- Christopher McDonald
- Roddy McDowall
- Maureen McGovern
- Michael McGrath
- Frank McHugh
- Joey McIntyre
- Donna McKechnie
- Lonette McKee
- Julia McKenzie
- Nina Mae McKinney
- Elle McLemore
- John McMartin
- Barbara McNair
- Armelia McQueen
- Butterfly McQueen
- Kay Medford
- Eddie Mekka
- Idina Menzel
- Marian Mercer
- Melina Mercouri
- Una Merkel
- Ethel Merman
- Theresa Merritt
- Timothy Meyers
- Lea Michele
- Lin-Manuel Miranda

=== Mi–Mz ===
- Marilyn Michaels
- Lea Michele
- Keith Michell
- Ray Middleton
- Bette Midler
- Ruthie Ann Miles
- Cristin Milioti
- Ann Miller
- Marilyn Miller
- Patina Miller
- Sienna Miller
- Florence Mills
- Greg Mills
- Hayley Mills
- Stephanie Mills
- Liza Minnelli
- Carmen Miranda
- Lin-Manuel Miranda
- Brian Stokes Mitchell
- James Mitchell
- John Cameron Mitchell
- Thomas Mitchell
- Lauren Molina
- Debra Monk
- Paolo Montalban
- Ricardo Montalbán
- Liliane Montevecchi
- Ron Moody
- Grace Moore
- Mary Tyler Moore
- Maureen Moore
- Melba Moore
- Victor Moore
- Jinkx Monsoon
- Lisa Mordente
- Tony Mordente
- Rita Moreno
- Frank Morgan
- Helen Morgan
- Patricia Morison
- Anita Morris
- Garrett Morris
- Matthew Morrison
- Robert Morse
- Euan Morton
- Joe Morton
- Sydney Morton
- Zero Mostel
- Jessie Mueller
- Megan Mullally
- Jules Munshin
- Patti Murin
- Julia Murney
- Donna Murphy
- George Murphy
- Peg Murray
- Pamela Myers
- Timothy Myers

== N ==
- Mildred Natwick
- James Naughton
- Barry Nelson
- Gene Nelson
- Bebe Neuwirth
- Phyllis Newman
- Julie Newmar
- Patricia Neway
- Alex Newell
- Anthony Newley
- Sahr Ngaujah
- The Nicholas Brothers
- Denise Nickerson
- Gertrude Niesen
- Marni Nixon
- Eva Noblezada
- Christiane Noll
- Brandy Norwood
- Jack Norworth
- Ivor Novello
- Carrie Nye
- Louis Nye
- Russell Nype

== O ==
- Richard O'Brien
- Caroline O'Connor
- Donald O'Connor
- Aubrey O'Day
- Rosie O'Donnell
- Kelli O'Hara
- Maureen O'Hara
- Paige O'Hara
- Denis O'Hare
- John O'Hurley
- Tessie O'Shea
- Michael O'Sullivan
- Jack Oakie
- Leslie Odom Jr.
- Edna May Oliver
- Karen Olivo
- Nancy Opel
- Jerry Orbach
- Brad Oscar
- Laura Osnes

== P ==
- Ken Page
- Patrick Page
- Elaine Paige
- Janis Paige
- Leland Palmer
- Hugh Panaro
- Ashley Park
- Joshua Park
- Nicole Parker
- Sarah Jessica Parker
- Hunter Parrish
- Estelle Parsons
- Adam Pascal
- Mandy Patinkin
- Lauren Patten
- Meredith Patterson
- Alan Paul
- Michele Pawk
- Alice Pearce
- Mary Beth Peil
- Ann Pennington
- Anthony Perkins
- Osgood Perkins
- Bernadette Peters
- Brock Peters
- Clarke Peters
- Lauri Peters
- Lenka Peterson
- Irra Petina
- Valarie Pettiford
- Molly Picon
- Walter Pidgeon
- David Hyde Pierce
- Bryce Pinkham
- Tonya Pinkins
- Ezio Pinza
- Karine Plantadit
- Marc Platt
- Ben Platt
- Alice Playten
- Christopher Plummer
- Billy Porter
- Eleanor Powell
- Jane Powell
- Jenny Powers
- Josephine Premice
- Harve Presnell
- Robert Preston
- Gilbert Price
- Lonny Price
- Vincent Price
- Faith Prince
- Jonathan Pryce

== Q ==
- Anna Quayle
- Mae Questel
- Anthony Quinn

== R ==
- Daniel Radcliffe
- Charlotte Rae
- George Raft
- Ron Raines
- John Raitt
- Tommy Rall
- Sheryl Lee Ralph
- Sara Ramirez
- Anthony Ramos
- Sally Rand
- Tony Randall
- Da’Vine Joy Randolph
- Andrew Rannells
- Anthony Rapp
- Reneé Rapp
- Phylicia Rashad
- Raven-Symoné
- Martha Raye
- Usher Raymond
- Lee Roy Reams
- Vivian Reed
- Roger Rees
- Charles Nelson Reilly
- Kate Reinders
- Carl Reiner
- Ann Reinking
- Charles Repole
- Clive Revill
- Debbie Reynolds
- Kyle Riabko
- Ian Richardson
- Natasha Richardson
- Ron Richardson
- Eden Riegel
- Molly Ringwald
- Alice Ripley
- Cyril Ritchard
- Thelma Ritter
- Chita Rivera
- Jerome Robbins
- Lyda Roberti
- Joan Roberts
- Tony Roberts
- Paul Robeson
- Bill Robinson
- Marcia Rodd
- Jai Rodriguez
- Krysta Rodriguez
- Kate Rockwell
- Elena Roger
- Anne Rogers
- Ginger Rogers
- Will Rogers
- Will Roland
- Esther Rolle
- Linda Ronstadt
- Mickey Rooney
- Dee Roscioli
- Anika Noni Rose
- George Rose
- Ted Ross
- Lillian Roth
- Patricia Routledge
- Daphne Rubin-Vega
- John Rubinstein
- Rita Rudner
- Frances Ruffelle
- Michael Rupert
- Lillian Russell
- Rosalind Russell
- Irene Ryan
- Peggy Ryan
- Roz Ryan

== S ==
- Ernie Sabella
- George Salazar
- Lea Salonga
- Stark Sands
- Jimmy Savo
- Josefina Scaglione
- Jana Schneider
- Susan H. Schulman
- Peter Scolari
- Sherie Rene Scott
- Elizabeth Seal
- Harry Secombe
- Vivienne Segal
- Kyle Selig
- Janie Sell
- Coleen Sexton
- Shanice
- Dick Shawn
- Tony Sheldon
- Carole Shelley
- Hiram Sherman
- Brooke Shields
- Martin Short
- Richard B. Shull
- Ethel Shutta
- Christopher Sieber
- Cesare Siepi
- Phil Silvers
- Hal Skelly
- Emily Skinner
- Walter Slezak
- Mews Small
- Alexis Smith
- Queenie Smith
- Rex Smith
- Alexandra Socha
- Phillipa Soo
- Paul Sorvino
- Ann Sothern
- J. Robert Spencer
- Kenneth Spencer
- Brent Spiner
- Victor Spinetti
- June Squibb
- Lewis J. Stadlen
- John Stamos
- Elizabeth Stanley
- Pat Stanley
- Jean Stapleton
- Lucas Steele
- Tommy Steele
- Bobby Steggert
- Anthony Stephens
- Frances Sternhagen
- David Ogden Stiers
- Emma Stone
- Leonard Stone
- Meryl Streep
- Barbra Streisand
- Josh Strickland
- Elaine Stritch
- Ali Stroker
- Sally Struthers
- Jo Sullivan
- Yma Sumac
- Pat Suzuki
- Inga Swenson
- Swen Swenson
- Will Swenson
- Paulo Szot

== T ==
- Caren Lyn Tackett
- Jason Tam
- Eva Tanguay
- John Tartaglia
- Lilyan Tashman
- Rip Taylor
- Valerie Taylor
- Wesley Taylor
- Lara Teeter
- Fay Templeton
- Norma Terris
- Mary Testa
- Donna Theodore
- Lynne Thigpen
- Jennifer Laura Thompson
- Tracie Thoms
- Kenneth Tobey
- Chaim Topol
- Constance Towers
- Helen Traubel
- John Travolta
- Taylor Trensch
- Louise Troy
- Tom Tryon
- Sophie Tucker
- Tommy Tune
- Aaron Tveit
- Judy Tyler

== U ==
- Leslie Uggams
- Miyoshi Umeki
- Brandon Uranowitz
- Michael Urie
- Jenna Ushkowitz

== V ==
- Brenda Vaccaro
- Rudy Vallee
- Bobby Van
- Vivian Vance
- Dick Van Dyke
- Lupe Vélez
- Benay Venuta
- Gwen Verdon
- Ben Vereen
- Willemijn Verkaik
- Virginia Vestoff
- Martin Vidnovic
- Max von Essen

== W ==
- Chuck Wagner
- Benjamin Walker
- Fredi Walker
- Nancy Walker
- Shani Wallis
- Barbara Walsh
- Ray Walston
- Charles Walters
- Adrienne Warren
- Lesley Ann Warren
- Gedde Watanabe
- Ken Watanabe
- Ethel Waters
- Dilys Watling
- Susan Watson
- David Wayne
- Clifton Webb
- Barrett Wilbert Weed
- Robert Weede
- Elisabeth Welch
- Raquel Welch
- Orson Welles
- Robert Westenberg
- Helen Westley
- Bert Wheeler
- Lillias White
- Richard White
- Sammy White
- Terri White
- Paxton Whitehead
- Mary Wickes
- Teal Wicks
- Lee Wilkof
- Bert Williams
- Vanessa Williams
- Michelle Williams
- Michelle Williams
- Nicol Williamson
- Walter Willison
- Chandra Wilson
- Dooley Wilson
- Patrick Wilson
- Trey Wilson
- Beatrice Winde
- Barbara Windsor
- Charles Winninger
- Marissa Jaret Winokur
- Hattie Winston
- Edward Winter
- Norman Wisdom
- Ignatius Wolfington
- BD Wong
- Charles Wood
- Tom Wopat
- Jo Anne Worley
- Lauren Worsham
- Fay Wray
- Amra-Faye Wright
- Samuel E. Wright
- Gretchen Wyler
- Nick Wyman
- Patrice Wymore
- Ed Wynn
- Keenan Wynn
- Jessica Keenan Wynn

== Y ==
- Tony Yazbeck
- Rachel York
- John Lloyd Young
- Josh Young

== Z ==
- Pia Zadora
- Jerry Zaks
- Remy Zaken
- Karen Ziemba
- Chip Zien
- Vera Zorina

== See also ==
- List of people from New York City
- Lists of actors
