= Mark Lambert (American actor) =

American actor and singer (born 1952)

- Born: Mark Robert Luebke; January 19, 1952 (age 74)
- Occupations: Actor, singer
- Years active: 1971–present
- Spouse: Victoria Mallory (m. 1975; died 2014)
- Children: 1

Mark Lambert (born Mark Robert Luebke; January 19, 1952) is an American actor and singer.

== Early life ==
He was born Mark Robert Luebke and grew up in San Jose, California, where he graduated from Oak Grove High School in 1970. He was discovered by a Hollywood manager while appearing at the San Jose Community Theatre.

== Career ==
After moving to Los Angeles, Lambert made a single episode appearance of Room 222. He went on to guest star in a variety of television shows, including The Mod Squad, The Partridge Family, and Ironside. He made his Broadway-theatre début in New York City originating the role of Henrik Egerman in the musical-theatre production of A Little Night Music (1973–74) with music and lyrics by Stephen Sondheim and book by Hugh Wheeler. After Night Music closed, Lambert moved back to California and appeared in feature films and television productions.

He dubbed the singing voice for "Tomorrow Belongs to Me" in Cabaret (1972), although the screen role was played by Oliver Collignon, a young German extra; both Lambert and Collignon were uncredited.

== Personal life ==
Lambert married actress Victoria Mallory in 1975; they remained together until her death from cancer in 2014. The couple had a daughter, Ramona Mallory Lambert, also an actress, known professionally as Ramona Mallory.

== Filmography ==
=== Film ===
| Year | Title | Role | Notes |
|---|---|---|---|
| 1972 | Cabaret | Hitler youth singer | Uncredited |
| 1984 | Champions | Sean | |
| 1987 | A Prayer for the Dying | Ainsley | |
| 1996 | Jude | Tinker Taylor | |
| 2000 | Borstal Boy | Chief Dixon | |
| 2002 | Evelyn | Minister of Education | |
| 2003 | Veronica Guerin | Willie Kealy | |
| 2004 | Vendetta: No Conscience, No Mercy | Dwight | |
| 2005 | Breakfast on Pluto | Bishop's Secretary | |
| 2006 | The Tiger's Tail | District Judge | |
| 2009 | Savage | Garda Superintendent | Voice |
| 2016 | The Journey | Bertie Ahern | |

=== Television ===
| Year | Title | Role | Notes |
|---|---|---|---|
| 1971 | Room 222 | Val Silverton | Episode: "Episode: "The Sins of the Fathers" |
| 1972 | The Mod Squad | Palo Harrison | Episode: "No More Oak Leaves for Ernie Holland" |
| 1972 | Ironside | Harv Fowler | Episode: "The Countdown" |
| 1972 | The Partridge Family | Dale | Episode: "Whatever Happened to Keith Partridge?" |
| 1972 | The Rookies | Frank | Episode: "A Very Special Piece of Ground" |
| 1975 | The Streets of San Francisco | Randy Pruitt | Episode: "School of Fear" |
| 1975 | The Secrets of Isis | Fred Wieting | Episode: "No Drums, No Trumpets" |
| 1976 | Medical Story | Dr. Sandler | Episode: "The Quality of Mercy" |
| 1976 | The Quest | Young Punk | Television film |
| 1977 | The Fantastic Journey | Alpha | Episode: "Children of the Gods" |
| 1977 | Quincy, M.E. | Officer James Wells | Episode: "A Dead Man's Truth" |
| 1977 | Mulligan's Stew | Denny | Episode: "Melinda Special" |
| 1982 | Ennal's Point | Gorman | Episode: "The Jade" |
| 1983 | Caught in a Free State | Sean McGlynn | 4 episodes |
| 1984 | The Young Ones | Bank Manager | Episode: "Summer Holiday" |
| 1986 | Screen Two | Christy Lucey | Episode: "Time After Time" |
| 1988 | The Face of Trespass | Francis | Television film |
| 1991 | Bottom | Gasman | Episode: "Gas" |
| 1991 | Boon | Stan | Episode: "Help Me Make It Through the Night" |
| 1993–1998 | The Bill | Various roles | 6 episodes |
| 1994 | Scarlett | Donnelly | 3 episodes |
| 1995 | Cracker | David Harvey | 2 episodes |
| 1995 | Kidnapped | John | Television film |
| 1995 | Beyond Reason | DI Albert Christie | Television film |
| 1996 | Casualty | Clive Wingate | Episode: "Asking for Miracles" |
| 1996 | Dalziel and Pascoe | Marcus Felstead | Episode: "A Clubbable Woman" |
| 1996 | Annie's Bar | Tory Whip | 3 episodes |
| 1996 | September | George | Television film |
| 1996 | Rough Justice | Pat Molloy | Episode: "Who Killed Carl Bridgewater?" |
| 1996 | Sharpe | Colonel Girdwood | Episode: "Sharpe's Regiment" |
| 1996 | Bramwell | Jack Beamish | Episode #2.7 |
| 1996 | Performance | J. O'Leary | Episode: "Broken Glass" |
| 1997 | A Touch of Frost | Peter Lawson | Episode: "No Other Love" |
| 1998 | Vanity Fair | Major O'Dowd | 3 episodes |
| 1999 | Durango | Algie Clawhammer | Television film |
| 2002 | No Tears | Minister for Health | Miniseries |
| 2002 | Sunday | Jack Doherty | Television film |
| 2002 | Fergus's Wedding | Julian / Jules | 4 episodes |
| 2003 | Benedict Arnold: A Question of Honor | Joshua Smith | Television film |
| 2003 | Rosemary & Thyme | Derek Kelly | Episode: "A Simple Plot" |
| 2004 | Proof | Frank Erskine | 2 episodes |
| 2004 | The Big Bow Wow | Sullivan | 3 episodes |
| 2007 | Be More Ethnic | Station Policeman | Television film |
| 2007 | Inspector George Gently | Corby | Episode: "Gently Go Man" |
| 2007 | The Tudors | William Cornish | 2 episodes |
| 2008 | Single-Handed | Malachy Doran | 2 episodes |
| 2008 | Heartbeat | Tom Padgett | Episode: "Take Three Girls" |
| 2009 | Durham County | Umpire | Episode: "Little Lost Children" |
| 2009 | The Last Templar | New York Cop #2 | 2 episodes |
| 2009–2015 | Roy | Mr. Hammond | 31 episodes |
| 2010–2013 | Raw | Des Harte | 4 episodes |
| 2011 | Hidden | Ian Savage | Episode #1.4 |
| 2012 | 13 Steps Down | Various roles | 2 episodes |
| 2013 | An Crisis | President Van de Veld | 5 episodes |
| 2014 | Play Next Door | John | Episode: "Pheasant Island" |
| 2016 | Rebellion | Brigadier Blackader | 2 episodes |
| 2016 | Orange Is the New Black | Singer | Episode: "We'll Always Have Baltimore" |
| 2016–2017 | Fair City | Trigger Foley | 29 episodes |
| 2017 | Nowhere Fast | David | Episode: "Work" |
| 2018 | Women on the Verge | Bernard | 3 episodes |
| 2019 | Agatha and the Curse of Ishtar | Godfrey | Television film |
| 2020 | The South Westerlies | Paudi | 3 episodes |
