= September (1996 film) =

1996 film

September Rosamunde Pilcher's September
- Directed by: Colin Bucksey
- Written by: Lee Langley; Rosamunde Pilcher
- Produced by: Claus Beling; Stephan Wiesehöfer; Nigel Watts
- Starring: Jenny Agutter; Michael York; Jacqueline Bisset
- Cinematography: Peter Sinclair
- Edited by: Roy Watts
- Music by: Richard Hartley
- Release date: 7 April 1996
- Running time: 171 minutes
- Countries: Germany; United Kingdom
- Language: English
- Budget: $12 million

September is a German-British made-for-television drama film of 1996 directed by Colin Bucksey, based on a novel of the same name by Rosamunde Pilcher.

== Plot ==
The action takes place at Strathcroy in the Scottish Highlands, where Verena Steynton is holding a party for her daughter, with many upper-class guests. These include Pandora, who vanished twenty years before, her brother Lord Archie Balmerino, and Edmund Aird, a rich business man, and his American wife. And then a dead body is found in the loch.

== Cast ==
- Jenny Agutter as Isobel Balmerino
- Michael York as Edmund Aird
- Jacqueline Bisset as Pandora Balmerino
- Judy Parfitt as Verena Steynton
- Edward Fox as Lord Archie Balmerino
- Mariel Hemingway as Virginia
- Virginia McKenna as Violet Aird
- Emily Hamilton as Alexa Aird
- Paul Guilfoyle as Conrad Tucker
- Angela Pleasence as Lottie Carstairs
- Anna Cropper as Edie
- Jesse Birdsall as Neil
- Mark Lambert as George
- Derry Power as Barman

== Production ==
The film was produced by a partnership of the German television company ZDF, which had bought the film rights to all of Pilcher’s work, and BSkyB. It was filmed in Scotland in the summer of 1995.

== See also ==
- Rosamunde Pilcher (Filmreihe), on the German Wikipedia
