= Somebody Killed Her Husband =

1978 film by Lamont Johnson

- Directed by: Lamont Johnson
- Written by: Reginald Rose
- Produced by: Martin Poll
- Starring: Farrah Fawcett-Majors; Jeff Bridges; John Wood; Tammy Grimes; John Glover; Patricia Elliott; Mary McCarty; Lawrence Guittard; Vincent Robert Santa Lucia; Beeson Carroll
- Cinematography: Andrew Laszlo; Ralf D. Bode
- Edited by: Barry Malkin
- Music by: Alex North
- Production company: Melvin Simon Productions
- Distributed by: Columbia Pictures
- Release date: September 29, 1978
- Running time: 97 minutes
- Country: United States
- Language: English
- Budget: $5.1 million

Somebody Killed Her Husband is a 1978 American comedy–mystery film directed by Lamont Johnson and written by Reginald Rose. It starred Farrah Fawcett and Jeff Bridges. Also in the cast were John Wood, Tammy Grimes and John Glover.

== Plot ==
The film is set in Manhattan, New York City. The plot concerns the efforts of a woman (Fawcett) and her lover (Bridges) to find the murderer of her husband before they are accused of it themselves. The story's climax takes place in the toy department and Santa's house of Macy's famous department store. Reginald Rose's screenplay was nominated for an Edgar Allan Poe Award. Strewn throughout this story are clues that implicate real elements of the former President Richard Nixon's activities regarding Watergate and are followed by Bridges' and Fawcett's characters throughout the movie to find out who killed her husband.

== Cast ==
- Farrah Fawcett – Jenny Moore (as Farrah Fawcett-Majors)
- Jeff Bridges – Jerry Green
- John Wood – Ernest Van Santen
- Tammy Grimes – Audrey Van Santen
- John Glover – Herbert Little
- Patricia Elliott – Helene
- Mary McCarty – Flora
- Laurence Guittard – Preston Moore
- Vincent Robert Santa Lucia – Benjamin
- Beeson Carroll – Frank Danziger
- Eddie Lawrence – Other Neighbor
- Arthur Rhyris – Customer
- Jean-Pierre Stewart – Man in Beret
- Terri DuHaime – Lulu's Mother
- Sands Hall – Girl Typist

== Production ==
Martin Poll acquired the script from Reginald Rose in 1976.

Farrah Fawcett had become a star on Charlie's Angels but quit the show. Charlie's Angels producers were suing her. Paramount wanted Fawcett for the lead in Foul Play but were reluctant to hire her with a lawsuit hanging over her head. Poll however signed her to make Somebody Killed Her Husband for a fee of nearly $1 million.

Filming took place in November 1977. The budget was a reported $4.5 million.

== Release ==
The film was not a big hit but Melvin Simon made a $2 million profit by pre-selling the film. He presold it to TV for $3.5 million, sold the foreign rights for $1.8 million, got an advance from Columbia for $1 million and sold TV syndication rights for $850,000. Shortly after the film was released, Who Is Killing the Great Chefs of Europe? came out, which originally was going to be titled Someone Is Killing the Great Chefs of Europe?, but the title was changed to avoid confusion between the two films.

== Reception ==
Reviews for the film were poor. Roger Ebert gave the film 2/4 stars and claimed the leads had no chemistry and by the end of the film "We’ve long since ceased to have much interest." Time Out described the film as a "leaden comedy-thriller". Bernard Drew of The San Bernardino Sun claimed the film "won't be recalled ten weeks from now."

== See also ==
- List of American films of 1978
