= Patricia Elliott =

American actress

- Born: July 21, 1938; Gunnison, Colorado, U.S.
- Died: December 20, 2015 (aged 77); New York City, U.S.
- Education: University of Colorado
- Occupation: Actress
- Years active: 1968–2011
- Known for: Renée Divine Buchanan (One Life to Live)
- Awards: Tony Award for Best Performance by a Featured Actress in a Musical (1973) for A Little Night Music

Patricia Elliott (July 21, 1938 – December 20, 2015) was an American theater, film, soap opera and television actress.

== Early life ==
Elliott was born July 21, 1938, in Gunnison, Colorado to Clyde and Lavon (née Gibson) Elliott. She claimed direct descent from President Ulysses S. Grant, John Winthrop (first governor of Massachusetts) and Mary Lyon (founder of what became Mount Holyoke College). She graduated from South High School, Denver.

In 1960, Elliott graduated from the University of Colorado and then studied at the London Academy of Music and Dramatic Art. She worked at the Cleveland Play House, the Guthrie Theater in Minneapolis and Arena Stage in Washington, D.C., among others, before moving to New York.

== Career ==
Elliott began her career in 1968 in the science fiction film The Green Slime. She later appeared in the films Birch Interval (1976), Somebody Killed Her Husband (1978), and Natural Enemies (1979).

In 1973, Elliott appeared in a made-for-TV adaptation of The Man Without a Country. In 1976 she portrayed Minnie Adams in The Adams Chronicles, a thirteen-episode miniseries on PBS. She is best known for her portrayal of Renée Divine Buchanan on the ABC soap opera One Life to Live, a role she played on a recurring basis from 1988 to 2011. She assumed the role from its originator, Phyllis Newman. She guest starred on such television series as Kojak, the ABC Afterschool Special, St. Elsewhere, and Spenser: For Hire.

She won a Tony Award for her performance as Countess Charlotte Malcolm in the original 1973 production of Stephen Sondheim musical A Little Night Music. She played the role of Dorine in the 1977 Circle in the Square revival of Molière's Tartuffe, for which she was nominated for a Drama Desk Award. She reprised this role when the production was restaged for television on PBS in 1978.

== Personal life ==
Elliot married Christopher V H Fay on September 10, 1960 in Clinton, Connecticut. They were divorced. She also was briefly married to Peter Heath.

== Death ==
Elliot died in Manhattan on December 20, 2015, aged 77. Broadway.com reported that she died of leiomyosarcoma, a rare cancer.

== Filmography ==
=== Film ===
| Year | Title | Role | Notes | Ref. |
|---|---|---|---|---|
| 1968 | The Green Slime | Nurse | Science fiction film directed by Kinji Fukasaku. | |
| 1976 | Birch Interval | Martha | Directed by Delbert Mann. | |
| 1978 | Somebody Killed Her Husband | Helene | Comedy/mystery film directed by Lamont Johnson and written by Reginald Rose. | |
| 1979 | Natural Enemies | Woman on Train | Directed by Jeff Kanew. | |
| 1996 | Criminal Hearts | Good Samaritan | Directed and written by Dave Payne. | |
| 1997 | Casper: A Spirited Beginning | Mortified Teacher | A direct-to-video and first prequel/spin-off to the 1995 film Casper.; Directed by Sean McNamara. | |
| 1998 | Casper Meets Wendy | Snotty Woman | A direct-to-video film which is a sequel to Casper: A Spirited Beginning; A prequel/spin-offs to the 1995 film Casper; Credited as Pat Elliot | |
| 1998 | Ri¢hie Ri¢h's Christmas Wish | Hazel | Also known as Richie Rich 2; A direct-to-video stand-alone sequel to the 1994 film Richie Rich.; Directed by John Murlowski. | |
| 2000 | 101 Ways (The Things a Girl Will Do to Keep Her Volvo) | Ruth | Directed and written by Jennifer B. Katz. | |
| 2019 | Grand-Daddy Day Care | Terrified Woman | | |

=== Television ===
| Year | Title | Role | Notes | Ref. |
|---|---|---|---|---|
| 1973 | The Man Without a Country | Mrs. Graff | Made-for-TV-Movie directed by Delbert Mann. | |
| 1976 | The Adams Chronicles | Minnie Adams | Miniseries; Chapter XII: Henry Adams, Historian; Chapter XIII: Charles Francis Adams II, Industrialist | |
| 1977 | Kojak | Christina | Episode: ""The Godson" (S 4:Ep 15) | |
| 1977 | The Quinns | Rita Quinn O'Neill | Made-for-TV-Movie; Directed by Daniel Petrie. | |
| 1978 | Tartuffe | Dorine | Made-for-TV-Movie; Directed by Kirk Browning and Stephen Porter. | |
| 1981 | Summer Solstice | Emily | Made-for-TV-Movie; Directed by Ralph Rosenblum. | |
| 1982 | ABC Afterschool Special | Ellen Davis | Episode: "Sometimes I Don't Love My Mother" (S 10:Ep 7) | |
| 1982 | Nurse | Ellen Geddis | Episode: "Euthanasia" | |
| 1984 | Empire | Renee | Main cast | |
| 1984 | St. Elsewhere | Ms. Colman | Episode: "The Women" (S 2:Ep 19) | |
| 1984 | Partners in Crime | Phyllis | Episode: "Celebrity (Pilot)" (S 1:Ep 1) | |
| 1984 | The Cartier Affair | Margo Houser | Made-for-TV-Movie; Directed by Rod Holcomb. | |
| 1985 | Hill Street Blues | Patient of Dr. Rose | Episode: "Dr. Hoof and Mouth" (S 5: Ep 14) | |
| 1985 | Spenser: For Hire | Edie James | Episode: "Discord in a Minor" (S 1:Ep 6) | |
| 1987 | Spenser: For Hire | Vera Canning | Episode: "I Confess" (S 2:Ep 12) | |
| 1987 | A Special Friendship | Mrs. Davis | Made-for-TV-Movie; Directed by Fielder Cook. | |
| 1987 | The Ladies | Darlene | Made-for-TV-Movie; Directed by Jackie Cooper. | |
| 1988 | One Life to Live | Renée Divine Buchanan #2 | Contract role: 1987–2003; Recurring: 2003–11 | |
| 1988 | Kate & Allie | Guest | Episode: "A Catered Affair" (S 5:Ep 13) | |
| 1998 | Men in White | Girl Scout Leader | A straight-to-television satirical parody of contemporary science fiction movies, mainly spoofing Men in Black and Independence Day.; Directed by Scott P. Levy (Credited as Scott Levy) and Bruce McCarthy (uncredited) | |

=== Theatre ===
| Year | Title | Role | Theatre | Notes | Ref. |
|---|---|---|---|---|---|
| 1968 | King Lear | Regan; November 07, 1968–February 12, 1969 | Vivian Beaumont Theatre | Revival; Directed by Gerald Freedman. | |
| 1968 | A Cry of Players | Townsperson; November 14, 1968–February 15, 1969 | Vivian Beaumont Theatre | Original performer; Directed by Gene Frankel. | |
| 1969 | King Henry V | Alice; November 10, 1969–November 22, 1969 | ANTA Playhouse | Revival; Directed by Michael Kahn. | |
| 1971 | A Doll's House | Kristine Linde; January 13, 1971–June 26, 1971 | Playhouse Theatre | Revival; Directed by Patrick Garland. | |
| 1971 | Hedda Gabler | Thea Elvsted; February 17, 1971–June 19, 1971 | Playhouse Theatre | Revival; Directed by Patrick Garland. | |
| 1973 | A Little Night Music | Countess Charlotte Malcolm; February 25, 1973–August 3, 1974 | Shubert Theatre February 25, 1973–September 15, 1973; Majestic Theatre September 17, 1973–August 3, 1974 | Original performer; Directed by Harold Prince. | |
| 1977 | The Shadow Box | Beverly; March 31, 1977–December 31, 1977 | Morosco Theatre | Original performer; Directed by Gordon Davidson. | |
| 1977 | Tartuffe | Dorine; September 25, 1977–November 20, 1977 | Circle in the Square Theatre | Original performer; Directed by Stephen Porter. | |
| 1978 | 13 Rue de l'Amour | Leontine; March 16, 1978–May 21, 1978 | Circle in the Square Theatre | Original performer; Directed by Basil Langton. | |
| 1979 | The Elephant Man | Mrs. Kendal/Pinhead; April 19, 1979–June 28, 1981 | Booth Theatre | Replacement performer; Directed by Jack Hofsiss. | |
| 1987 | A Month of Sundays | Julia; April 16–April 18 | Ritz Theatre | A comedy by Bob Larbey.; Later adapted by Larbey as the 1989 television movie Age-Old Friends.; Directed by Gene Saks. | |

== Awards and nominations ==
| Year | Award | Category | Nominated work | Result | Ref. |
|---|---|---|---|---|---|
| 1973 | Tony Awards | Best Supporting or Featured Actress in a Musical | A Little Night Music | Won | |
| 1977 | Tony Awards | Best Featured Actress in a Play | The Shadow Box | Nominated | |
| 1978 | Drama Desk Awards | Outstanding Actress in a Play | Tartuffe | Won | |
| 1992 | Soap Opera Digest Awards | Outstanding Supporting Actress | One Life to Live | Nominated | |
| 1993 | Soap Opera Digest Awards | Outstanding Supporting Actress | One Life to Live | Nominated | |
