= A Little Night Music (film) =

1977 film by Harold Prince

- Theatrical release poster
- Directed by: Harold Prince
- Screenplay by: Hugh Wheeler
- Based on: A Little Night Music by Hugh Wheeler; Smiles of a Summer Night by Ingmar Bergman
- Produced by: Elliott Kastner
- Starring: Elizabeth Taylor; Diana Rigg; Len Cariou; Lesley-Anne Down
- Cinematography: Arthur Ibbetson
- Edited by: John Jympson
- Music by: Stephen Sondheim; Jonathan Tunick
- Production companies: Sascha-Verleih; S&T-Film Berlin
- Distributed by: New World Pictures
- Release date: September 30, 1977 (United States)
- Running time: 119 minutes
- Countries: United States; West Germany; Austria
- Language: English
- Budget: $6 million–$7.2 million

A Little Night Music (German: Das Lächeln einer Sommernacht) is a 1977 musical romantic comedy film directed by Harold Prince, his second and final directorial role. The screenplay by Hugh Wheeler is adapted from his libretto for Stephen Sondheim's 1973 musical of the same name, itself based on Ingmar Bergman's 1955 film, Smiles of a Summer Night.

An international co-production of the United States, West Germany and Austria, the film stars Elizabeth Taylor, Diana Rigg and Lesley-Anne Down, and features Len Cariou, Hermione Gingold and Laurence Guittard reprising their Broadway roles.

== Plot ==
In a town in Austria at the turn of the 20th century, widower Frederich Egerman works as a successful lawyer but is struggling with his marriage to Anne, his 18-year-old second wife. Anne nervously has protected her virginity for the first eleven months of marriage, but continues to tell Frederich that she will be ready to have sex with him "soon". Frederich's son (from his first marriage) Erich is studying to be a member of the church. However, Erich has been lusting after Anne, whom he is only one year older than. Trying to please Anne, Frederich purchases tickets to a play touring through the city. The play stars renowned actress Desiree Armfeldt, Frederich's old flame from fourteen years before. When they lock eyes in the theatre, Anne becomes aggravated and demands to leave. After the play, Frederich and Desiree reunite in her dressing room.

While Desiree tours around Europe in play after play, her 14-year-old daughter, Fredericka, lives with Desiree's mother, Madame Armfeldt, in her estate in the country. Desiree, who is getting tired of her actress lifestyle, is thinking of settling down, and sets her sights on Frederich, despite his marriage. Desiree's own married lover Count Carl-Magnus Mittelheim eventually arrives at her dressing room and goes toe-to-toe with Frederich. Desiree lies and tells Carl-Magnus that Frederich is Madame Armfeldt's personal lawyer and that he was just dropping off documents. However, Carl-Magnus does not believe her. He reports the encounter to his wife Charlotte and tells her to visit Anne Egerman (whom she knows through her younger sister) and expose the affair. Charlotte complies, but Anne chooses not to confront Frederich.

Desiree persuades her mother to invite the Egermans to the country estate for the weekend, planning to convince Frederich to leave Anne and be with her. Upon receiving the invitation, Anne is insulted and refuses the offer. However, Charlotte tells her that it would be in her best interest to accept and sabotage Desiree's attempts at seducing Frederich. Anne accepts the invitation but once Carl-Magnus gets wind of the weekend in the country, he makes it his mission to go and challenge Frederich to a duel. The Egermans (Frederich, Anne, Erich and their maid Petra) and the Mittelheims drive out to the estate.

There, Desiree is shocked to see Carl-Magnus and his wife arriving. Nonetheless, she invites everyone to stay. Charlotte intends to flirt openly with Frederich to make her own husband jealous. Erich confides in Fredericka that he is in love with Anne but cannot do anything about it.

At dinner, tensions rise with Charlotte and Desiree throwing jabs at each other and Charlotte overtly flirting with Frederich. Erich calls everyone out for their absurd behavior before running outside to kill himself. However, Fredericka tells Anne the truth about Erich's love for her and she stops him from committing suicide. The two kiss before deciding to run away together.

In the privacy of her bedroom, Desiree attempts to follow through on her intentions with Frederich and confesses how much she wants to be with him. Despite admitting that there is a part of him that wants to be with Desiree, Frederich cannot bring himself to leave Anne. Frederich and Charlotte later witness Anne and Erich running off together. Charlotte consoles Frederich. After seeing this interaction, Carl-Magnus jumps to conclusions and challenges Frederich to a game of Russian Roulette.

Despite being the one to get the loaded chamber, Frederich only grazes his ear with the bullet. Desiree runs to his side while Charlotte and Carl-Magnus decide to return home together. Frederich mentions seeing Erich and Anne run off together and agrees to be with Desiree.

== Cast ==
- Elizabeth Taylor as Desiree Armfeldt
- Diana Rigg as Charlotte Mittelheim
- Len Cariou as Frederich Egerman
- Lesley-Anne Down as Anne Egerman
- Hermione Gingold as Madame Armfeldt
- Laurence Guittard as Count Carl-Magnus Mittelheim
- Christopher Guard as Erich Egerman
- Lesley Dunlop as Petra
- Heinz Marecek as Kurt
- Chloe Franks as Fredericka Armfeldt
- Jonathan Tunick as Conductor

== Production ==
=== Score ===
The film largely transposes the music and lyrics of the stage production, though some songs were cut. Sondheim made several notable adaptations for the screen: augmenting the "Night Waltz" theme with lyrics ("Love Takes Time"), adding a verse to "Every Day a Little Death", expanded lyrics for "Weekend in the Country", and entirely rewriting "The Glamorous Life" (a version that has been incorporated into several subsequent productions of the stage musical).

=== Location ===
The setting for the film was moved from Sweden to Austria and was filmed on location. This location shift changed the name of Frederich's son from Henrik to Erich.

== Release and reception ==
The film received mostly negative reviews, with much being made of Taylor's wildly fluctuating weight from scene to scene. Pauline Kael in The New Yorker was particularly scathing, writing that "This picture has been made as if Harold Prince had never seen a movie." Some critics talked more positively of the film, with Variety calling it "an elegant looking, period romantic charade". The film has received critical praise for Diana Rigg's performance. The film holds a 17% rating on Rotten Tomatoes based on 12 reviews.

== Accolades ==
Award	Category	Nominee(s)	Result	Ref.
Academy Awards	Best Costume Design	Florence Klotz	Nominated	
Academy Awards	Best Music, Original Song Score, and Its Adaptation or Best Adaptation Score	Jonathan Tunick	Won	

== Home media ==
A Little Night Music

Soundtrack album by Stephen Sondheim
- Released: 1977
- Recorded: 1974–1977
- Genre: Soundtrack
- Length: 49:07
- Label: Masterworks Broadway
- Producer: Jonathan Tunick

A soundtrack was released on LP. In 2013, Masterworks Broadway released an expanded edition on compact disc featuring one previously unreleased stereo track prepared for the LP and three mono tracks taken directly from the film's soundtrack.

The film was, for a time, available on VHS and LaserDisc. A DVD release was issued in June 2007. A newer version of "The Glamorous Life" was included on the new remastered version of the Original Broadway Cast Recording.
