= Black Rodeo =

1972 documentary film

- Directed by: Jeff Kanew
- Written by: Jeff Kanew
- Starring: Muhammad Ali
- Narrated by: Woody Strode
- Distributed by: Cinerama Releasing
- Release date: May 1, 1972
- Running time: 87 minutes
- Country: United States
- Language: English

Black Rodeo is a 1972 documentary by filmmaker Jeff Kanew.

== Overview ==
Black Rodeo captures the events surrounding the first-time performance of an all African-American rodeo at Triborough Stadium on Randall's Island, New York. The documentary shows that the people who attended the rodeo were awed to find African-American men and women actively involved in skills such as bronc riding, calf roping and brahma bull riding.

Actor Woody Strode attended the rodeo and appears in the film as its narrator. He imparts a number of stories that show the participation of blacks in the development of the American Old West.

The film captures the appearance of Muhammad Ali, who rides a horse on 125th Street (the main street in Harlem), trades friendly verbal jibes with the cowboys, straps on chaps and rides a bull.

The rodeo events in the film are set to the music of Aretha Franklin, Ray Charles, Little Richard, Lee Dorsey, Sammy Turner, Little Eva and other R&B acts.

The film was released by Cinerama Releasing in the spring of 1972.

== See also ==
- Black cowboys
- List of American films of 1972
