= Pieces of Eight (1985 musical) =

- Music: Jule Styne
- Lyrics: Susan Birkenhead
- Book: Michael Stewart, Mark Bramble
- Basis: Treasure Island by Robert Louis Stevenson
- Premiere: November 27, 1985: Citadel Theatre, Edmonton
- Productions: Edmonton 1985

Pieces of Eight is a musical with a book by Michael Stewart and Mark Bramble, lyrics by Susan Birkenhead, and music by Jule Styne. It is based on the classic 1883 novel Treasure Island by Robert Louis Stevenson.

The central characters are Jim Hawkins, a young man in possession of a treasure map, and the mutinous pirate Long John Silver, who serves as a mentor and father-figure to the boy.

The world premiere opened on November 27, 1985 at the Citadel Theatre in Edmonton. Joe Layton was the director and choreographer, and the cast included George Hearn (as Silver), Jonathan Ross, Graeme Campbell, George Lee Andrews, Robert Fitch, and Brian McKay.

According to theatre critic/historian Ken Mandelbaum, Pieces of Eight never got beyond its Edmonton production.
