= Laurence Guittard =

American actor and singer (born 1939)

- Born: July 16, 1939 (age 87); San Francisco, California
- Occupations: Actor, singer

Laurence Guittard (born July 16, 1939) is an American actor and singer, mostly appearing on the Broadway stage. He made his Broadway debut in Baker Street in 1965. Notable appearances include Count Carl-Magnus Malcolm in Stephen Sondheim's A Little Night Music, Curly in the 1979 revival of Oklahoma!, and as Don Quixote in several productions of Man of La Mancha.

Guittard was nominated for a Tony Award for Best Featured Actor in a Musical for his role in A Little Night Music; he won the 1973 Theatre World Award for the same role.

In 1978, he reprised the role of Count Malcolm in the film version of A Little Night Music, which starred Elizabeth Taylor.

For the 1973 Shubert Theatre celebration of Stephen Sondheim—performed by such all-star performers as Angela Lansbury, Alexis Smith, Dorothy Collins, Chita Rivera, Glynis Johns, Hermione Gingold, Anthony Perkins, Larry Kert, and many others — Guittard sang "We're Gonna Be All Right", which was included on the live recording made of that special occasion, Sondheim: A Musical Tribute (1973).

He lent his baritone voice and acting skills to the Broadway revival of She Loves Me and to the musical revue Rodgers and Hart. In 1995, he again appeared in A Little Night Music, this time playing the role of Frederik opposite Judi Dench's Desiree at the Royal National Theatre. He co-starred opposite Donna McKechnie, Dee Hoty, and Tony Roberts in the acclaimed all-star 1998 revival of the Sondheim-Goldman musical Follies at the Paper Mill Playhouse. In recent years he has appeared extensively at the Ahmanson Theatre and at the Old Globe in San Diego. He won the Los Angeles Drama Critics Circle Award for his ensemble performance in Cloud 9.

Television credits include Covenant, The Man Without a Country (1973 film), and Three's Company. He appeared in the comedy-mystery Somebody Killed Her Husband (1978).

Guittard is a scion of the Guittard family of chocolatiers.
