= A Little Night Music =

1973 musical

- Original Broadway windowcard
- Music: Stephen Sondheim
- Lyrics: Stephen Sondheim
- Book: Hugh Wheeler
- Basis: Smiles of a Summer Night by Ingmar Bergman
- Productions: 1973 Broadway; 1974 North American Tour; 1975 West End; 1975 South African Tour; 1977 Film; 1989 West End revival 1990 New York City Opera; 1995 Royal National Theatre; 1999 Houston Grand Opera; 2000 Barcelona; 2002 John F. Kennedy Center for the Performing Arts; 2003 NYCO revival 2008 Off-West End Revival; 2009 West End Revival; 2009 Broadway revival 2024 Lincoln Center; International productions
- Awards: Tony Award for Best Musical; Tony Award for Best Book; Tony Award for Best Original Score

A Little Night Music is a musical with music and lyrics by Stephen Sondheim and book by Hugh Wheeler. Inspired by the 1955 Ingmar Bergman film Smiles of a Summer Night, it involves the romantic lives of several couples. Its title is a literal English translation of the German name for Mozart's Serenade No. 13, K. 525, Eine kleine Nachtmusik. The musical includes the popular song "Send In the Clowns", written for Glynis Johns.

Since its original 1973 Broadway production, the musical has enjoyed professional productions in the West End, by opera companies, in a 2009 Broadway revival, and elsewhere, and it is a popular choice for regional groups. It was adapted for film in 1977, with Harold Prince directing and Elizabeth Taylor, Len Cariou, Lesley-Anne Down, and Diana Rigg starring.

== Synopsis ==
=== Act One ===
The setting is Sweden, around the turn of the 20th century. One by one, the Quintet – five singers who comment like a Greek chorus throughout the show – enter, tuning up. Gradually, their vocalizing becomes an overture blending fragments of "Remember," "Soon," and "The Glamorous Life." The other characters enter waltzing, each uncomfortable with their partner ("Night Waltz"). After they drift back off, the aging and sardonic Madame Leonora Armfeldt, a wealthy former courtesan, and her solemn granddaughter, Fredrika, enter. Madame Armfeldt tells Fredrika that the summer night "smiles" three times: first on the young, second on fools, and third on the old. Fredrika vows to watch the smiles occur.

Middle-aged, successful lawyer Fredrik Egerman has recently married an 18-year-old trophy wife, Anne, a naive girl who loves Fredrik but is not attracted to him. The two have been married for eleven months, and Anne still protects her virginity. Upon coming home from work, Fredrik surprises Anne with tickets to a play, starring Desiree Armfeldt, a glamorous actress whom Anne greatly admires. Anne giddily fantasizes about what it would be like to be as beautiful and beloved as Desiree, and starts talking at Fredrik about her day. Fredrik, distracted by his lust, considers various ways he might seduce his wife but ultimately rules each one out and elects to take a nap instead ("Now"). Meanwhile, his son Henrik, a seminary student a year older than his stepmother, is frustrated and ignored ("Later"). Anne promises her husband that shortly she will consent to have sex even though she can't help recoiling at his touch ("Soon"), and all three of them lament at once. The number concludes with Fredrik sighing Desiree's name in his sleep, which Anne overhears. Anne's maidservant Petra, an experienced and forthright girl, slightly older than the teen herself, offers her worldly but crass advice.

Desiree Armfeldt, although once prominent, is now a fading flower clinging onto what's left of her past fame. Desiree tours in small, obscure towns with her theatre troupe. Madame Armfeldt, Desiree's mother, has taken over the care of Desiree's daughter Fredrika. Fredrika misses her mother, but Desiree continually delays seeing her, preferring, somewhat ironically, her life on tour ("The Glamorous Life"). As Fredrik and Anne take their seats at Desiree's play, Anne's previous excitement quickly devolves into anxiety, suspicious that Fredrik and Desiree have a romantic history that he never disclosed to her. The play begins and Desiree immediately notices Fredrik in the audience, and the Quintet reveals their shared memories and passionate relationship ("Remember"). Desiree, ironically playing a sexually irresistible countess, exchanges amorous glances with Fredrik and delivers her lines in an overtly suggestive tone, confirming Anne's suspicions as true. Anne, upset and overwhelmed, demands that Fredrik take her home. Meanwhile, Petra tries to seduce a nervous and petulant Henrik.

That night, as Fredrik remembers his past with Desiree, he sneaks out to see her. The two have a happy but strained reunion, reflecting on their new lives. Desiree sarcastically boasts of her own adultery, as she has been seeing the married dragoon, Count Carl-Magnus Malcolm. Following, Fredrik tries to explain how much he loves Anne, fending off Desiree's interjecting quips, but he ultimately reveals his sexual frustration ("You Must Meet My Wife"). Upon learning that Fredrik has gone for eleven months without sex, she agrees to accommodate him as a favor for an old friend.

Madame Armfeldt offers advice to young Fredrika. The elderly woman reflects poignantly on her own checkered past and wonders what happened to prior refined styles of living ("Liaisons"). In Desiree's apartment, Count Carl-Magnus Malcolm proclaims his unannounced arrival in his usual booming tones. Fredrik and Desiree fool the Count with an innocent explanation for their disheveled appearance, but he is still suspicious. He boasts of his many duels and the various wounds he has suffered before demonstrating his skills in knife-throwing. Fredrik responds sarcastically, causing the dragoon to dislike him immediately. Carl-Magnus returns to his wife, Countess Charlotte. Charlotte knows of her husband's infidelity, but Carl-Magnus is too absorbed in his suspicions of Desiree to talk to her ("In Praise of Women"). When she persuades him to blurt out the whole story, a twist is revealed—Charlotte's little sister Marta is a schoolfriend of Anne's.

Charlotte visits Anne and describes Fredrik's tryst with Desiree. Anne is shocked and saddened, but Charlotte explains that such is the lot of a wife, and love brings pain ("Every Day a Little Death"). Meanwhile, Desiree asks Madame Armfeldt to host a party for Fredrik, Anne, and Henrik. Madame Armfeldt reluctantly agrees and sends out a personal invitation; its receipt sends Anne into a frenzy, imagining Desiree further seducing Fredrik at the estate. Anne does not want to accept the invitation, but Charlotte convinces her to do so to heighten the contrast between the older Desiree and the young and beautiful teenager. Charlotte relates this to the Count, who (much to her chagrin) decides to visit the Armfeldts, uninvited, as well. Carl-Magnus plans to challenge Fredrik to a duel, while Charlotte hopes to seduce the lawyer to make her husband jealous and end his philandering. The act ends as all characters head to Madame Armfeldt's estate ("A Weekend in the Country").

=== Act Two ===
Madame Armfeldt's country estate is bathed in the golden glow of perpetual summer sunset at this high latitude ("Night Waltz One and Two"). Everyone arrives, each with their own amorous purposes and desires—even Petra, who catches the eye of Armfeldt's fetching manservant, Frid. The women begin to quarrel with one another. Fredrik is astonished to learn the name of Desiree's daughter. Henrik meets Fredrika, and confesses to her he deeply loves Anne. Meanwhile, in the garden, Fredrik and Carl-Magnus reflect on the difficulty of being annoyed with Desiree, contrasting her immoral actions with her physical beauty ("It Would Have Been Wonderful"). Dinner is served, and the female Quintet singers comment on the characters’ suspense regarding the coming meal ("Perpetual Anticipation").

At dinner, Charlotte attempts to flirt with Fredrik and trades insults with Desiree. Soon, everyone is shouting and scolding everyone else, except for Henrik, who finally speaks up. He accuses the whole company of being amoral, and flees the scene. Stunned, everyone reflects on the situation and wanders away. Fredrika tells Anne of Henrik's secret love and the two dash off searching for him. Meanwhile, Desiree meets Fredrik and asks if he still wants to be "rescued" from his life. Fredrik answers honestly that he loves Desiree but cannot bring himself to hurt Anne. Regretful and hurt, Desiree can only reflect on the nature of her life and relationship with Fredrik ("Send In the Clowns"). Anne finds Henrik, who is attempting to commit suicide. The clumsy boy cannot complete the task, and Anne tells him she loves him, too. The pair begins to kiss, which leads to Anne's first sexual encounter. Meanwhile, not far away, Frid sleeps in Petra's lap. The maid imagines advantageous marriages but concludes that in the meantime, "a girl ought to celebrate what passes by" ("The Miller's Son"). Charlotte confesses her plan to Fredrik, and both watch Henrik and Anne, happy together, run away to start their new life. The two commiserate on a bench. Carl-Magnus, preparing to sleep with Desiree, sees this and jealously challenges Fredrik to Russian Roulette; Fredrik nervously misfires and merely grazes his own ear. Feeling victorious, Carl-Magnus reaffirms his love for Charlotte, finally granting her wish.

After the Count and Countess leave, Fredrika and Madame Armfeldt discuss the recent chaotic turns of events. The elderly woman asks Fredrika a surprising question: "What is it all for?" Fredrika thinks about this and decides that love, for all of its frustrations, "must be worth it." Madame Armfeldt is surprised, ruefully noting that she rejected love for material wealth at Fredrika's age. She praises her granddaughter and remembers true love's fleeting nature.

Fredrik finally confesses his love for Desiree, acknowledging that Fredrika is his daughter, and the two promise to start a new life together ("Send in the Clowns" (Reprise)). Madame Armfeldt sits alone with Fredrika, who tells her grandmother that she has watched carefully but still has not seen the night smile. Madame Armfeldt laughs and points out that the night has indeed smiled twice: first on Henrik and Anne, the young, and second on Desiree and Fredrik, the fools. As the two wait for the "third smile... on the old", it occurs: Madame Armfeldt closes her eyes and dies peacefully with Fredrika beside her ("Last Waltz").

== Musical numbers ==
Act I

- Overture – Mr. Lindquist, Mrs. Nordstrom, Mrs. Anderssen, Mr. Erlanson and Mrs. Segstrom (the "Quintet")
- "Night Waltz" – Company
- "Now" – Fredrik Egerman
- "Later" – Henrik Egerman
- "Soon" – Anne Egerman
- "Soon/Later/Now" – Anne, Henrik and Fredrik
- "The Glamorous Life" – Fredrika Armfeldt, Desiree Armfeldt, Madam Armfeldt and Quintet
- "Remember?" – Quintet
- "You Must Meet My Wife" – Desiree and Fredrik
- "Liaisons" – Madam Armfeldt
- "In Praise of Women" – Count Carl-Magnus Malcolm
- "Every Day a Little Death" – Countess Charlotte Malcolm and Anne
- "A Weekend in the Country" – Company

Act II

- Entr'acte – Orchestra
- "Night Waltz I (The Sun Won't Set)" – Quintet
- "Night Waltz II (The Sun Sits Low)" – Quintet
- "It Would Have Been Wonderful" – Fredrik and Carl-Magnus
- "Perpetual Anticipation" – Mrs. Nordstrom, Mrs. Segstrom and Mrs. Anderssen
- "Dinner Table Scene" – Orchestra
- "Send In the Clowns" – Desiree
- "The Miller's Son" – Petra
- "The World Won't End/Every Day a Little Death (reprise)" – Desiree and Charlotte
- Reprises ("Soon", "You Must Meet My Wife", "A Weekend in the Country" and "Every Day a Little Death") – Quintet
- "Send in the Clowns" (Reprise) – Desiree and Fredrik
- "Last Waltz" – Orchestra

Additional musical numbers

Stage:

- "Two Fairy Tales" – Henrik and Anne (cut in rehearsals when the tone of the musical changed)
- "Silly People" – Frid (cut for time when "The Miller's Son" was added in Boston)
- "Bang!" – Carl-Magnus (replaced by "In Praise of Women")
- "My Husband the Pig" – Charlotte (replaced by the second half of "In Praise of Women")

Screen:

- "Love Takes Time" – Company (lyrics added to Night Waltz)
- "The Glamorous Life" – Fredrika (solo version; later used combined with the original in the RNT revival)
- A new introductory verse to "Every Day a Little Death"
- Additional lyrics for "A Weekend in the Country", including a short section for Mme. Armfeldt

== Characters ==
- Fredrik Egerman: A successful widowed middle-aged lawyer. He is married to the 18-year-old Anne and has one son, Henrik, from his previous marriage. In the past, he and Desiree were lovers. Bass-Baritone A_{2}–E_{4}
- Anne Egerman (née Sorensen): Fredrik's new, naive wife, who is still a virgin after 11 months of marriage. Soprano G♯_{3}–A_{5}
- Henrik Egerman: Fredrik's son, 20 years old and Anne's stepson. He is serious but confused; he reads the works of philosophers and theologians whilst studying for the Lutheran priesthood. His sexual repression is a great cause of his turmoil, as he lusts after Anne and attempts to have a sexual encounter with Petra. Tenor G_{2}–B_{4}
- Petra: Anne's maid and closest confidante, brash, bold and flirtatious. She has relations with Henrik. Mezzo-soprano F♯_{3}–F_{5}
- Desiree Armfeldt: Self-absorbed, once-successful actress, now touring the countryside in what is clearly not the "glamorous life". Harboured love for Fredrik for years since their affair. Mezzo-soprano F♯_{3}–E_{5}
- Fredrika Armfeldt: Desiree's thirteen-year-old daughter, who may or may not be the product (unbeknownst to Fredrik) of the actress's and Fredrik's affair. Soprano C_{4}–E_{5}
- Madame Leonora Armfeldt: Desiree's mother, a former courtesan who has had "liaisons" with royalty. Contralto C_{3}–F♯_{4}
- Count Carl-Magnus Malcolm: A military dragoon who is Desiree's latest lover. Hypocritically places value on fidelity, being hugely possessive when it comes to both his wife and mistress. Comedic role. Operatic Baritone G_{2}–F♯_{4}
- Countess Charlotte Malcolm (née Olafsson): Carl-Magnus' wife, to whom he flaunts his infidelities. She despises her husband for his behaviour, but obeys his orders due to her hopeless love for him. Self-loathing and borderline alcoholic, yet the more intelligent half of the Malcolm couple. Mezzo-soprano G_{3}–F_{5}
- Frid: Madame Armfeldt's manservant. Has a tryst with Petra.
- The Quintet: Mr. Lindquist, Mrs. Nordstrom, Mrs. Anderssen, Mr. Erlanson and Mrs. Segstrom. A group of five singers that act as a Greek chorus. Sometimes referred to as the Liebeslieder Singers (love song singers) although Stephen Sondheim and Hugh Wheeler did not script them to have that title, using Quintet instead. The first usage of Liebeslieder for the Quintet came during the 1990 New York City Opera production. Prince said that these characters represent "people in the show who aren't wasting time ... the play is about wasting time."
- Malla: Desiree's maid, who is with her constantly. Silent part
- Osa: Maid at Madame Armfeldt's manse. Silent part
- Bertrand: Page at Madame Armfeldt's manse. Silent part

== Casts and characters ==
Character	Broadway	US National Tour	West End	First West End Revival	Second West End Revival	Off-West End Revival	Third West End Revival	First Broadway Revival	Lincoln Center Concert
Character	1973	1974	1975	1989	1995	2008	2009		2024
Desiree Armfeldt	Glynis Johns	Jean Simmons	Jean Simmons	Dorothy Tutin	Judi Dench	Hannah Waddingham	Hannah Waddingham	Catherine Zeta-Jones	Susan Graham
Fredrik Egerman	Len Cariou	George Lee Andrews	Joss Ackland	Peter McEnery	Laurence Guittard	Alexander Hanson	Alexander Hanson	Alexander Hanson	Ron Raines
Madame Armfeldt	Hermione Gingold	Margaret Hamilton	Hermione Gingold	Lila Kedrova	Siân Phillips	Maureen Lipman	Maureen Lipman	Angela Lansbury	Marsha Mason
Fredrika Armfeldt	Judy Kahan	Marti Morris	Christine McKenna-Tirella	Debra Beaumont	Claire Cox	Holly Hallam Grace Link	Holly Hallam Grace Link	Katherine Leigh Doherty Keaton Whittaker	Addie Harrington
Petra	D'Jamin Bartlett	Mary Ann Chinn	Diane Langton	Sara Weymouth	Issy van Randwyck	Kaisa Hammarlund	Kaisa Hammarlund	Leigh Ann Larkin	Cynthia Erivo
Henrik Egerman	Mark Lambert	Stephen Lehew	Terry Mitchell	Alexander Hanson	Brendan O'Hea	Gabriel Vick	Gabriel Vick	Hunter Ryan Herdlicka	Jason Gotay
Anne Egerman	Victoria Mallory	Virgina Pulos	Veronica Page	Deborah Poplett	Joanna Riding	Jessie Buckley	Jessie Buckley	Ramona Mallory	Kerstin Anderson
Frid	George Lee Andrews	Jonathan Banks	Michael N. Harbour	David Hitchen	Paul Kynman	Jeremy Finch	Andy Morton	Bradley Dean	Jin Ha
Countess Charlotte Malcolm	Patricia Elliott	Andra Akers	Maria Aitken	Susan Hampshire	Patricia Hodge	Kelly Price	Kelly Price	Erin Davie	Ruthie Ann Miles
Count Carl-Magnus Malcolm	Laurence Guittard	Ed Evanko	David Kernan	Eric Flynn	Lambert Wilson	Alistair Robins	Alistair Robins	Aaron Lazar	Shuler Hensley

=== Notable replacements ===
Broadway (1973–74)

- Fredrik Egerman: William Daniels

West End (1975)

- Desiree Armfeldt: Virginia McKenna
- Madame Armfeldt: Angela Baddeley
- Count Carl-Magnus: Michael N. Harbour

Broadway Revival (2009–11)

- Desiree Armfeldt: Bernadette Peters
- Madame Armfeldt: Elaine Stritch
- Fredrika Armfeldt: Katherine McNamara
- Frid: Ron Bohmer
- Count Carl-Magnus: Bradley Dean

== Productions ==
=== Original Broadway production ===
Subsequent to its January 23-February 10 tryout engagement at the Colonial Theatre (Boston),A Little Night Music opened on Broadway at the Shubert Theatre on February 25, 1973. It played there until September 15, 1973, then moved to the Majestic Theatre, on September 17, and closed there on August 3, 1974, after 601 performances and 12 previews. It was directed by Harold Prince with choreography by Patricia Birch and design by Boris Aronson. The cast included Glynis Johns (Desiree Armfeldt), Len Cariou (Fredrik Egerman), Hermione Gingold (Madame Armfeldt), Victoria Mallory (Anne Egerman), Judith Kahan (Fredrika Armfeldt), Mark Lambert (Henrik Egerman), Laurence Guittard (Carl-Magnus Malcolm), Patricia Elliott (Charlotte Malcolm), George Lee Andrews (Frid), and D'Jamin Bartlett (Petra). It won the New York Drama Critics' Circle Award and the Tony Award for Best Musical.

=== Australian premiere ===
The first international production opened at Her Majesty's Theatre in Sydney, Australia in November 1973, with a cast including Taina Elg, Bruce Barry, Jill Perryman, Doris Fitton, Anna Russell and Geraldine Turner. Australian revivals have been presented by the Sydney Theatre Company (featuring Geraldine Turner, John Waters, Michael Smith, Di Smith, Bettina Welch, Pippa Grandison,Rachael Beck and a young Toni Collette) in 1990, Melbourne Theatre Company (featuring Helen Morse and John O'May) in 1997, Opera Australia (featuring Sigrid Thornton and Anthony Warlow as Fredrik Egerman) in 2009, and Victorian Opera (featuring Ali McGregor, Simon Gleeson and Verity Hunt-Ballard) in 2019.

=== United States tour ===
A US national tour began on February 26, 1974, at the Forrest Theatre, Philadelphia, and ended on February 13, 1975, at the Shubert Theatre, Boston. Jean Simmons as Desiree Armfeldt, George Lee Andrews as Fredrik Egerman and Margaret Hamilton as Madame Armfeldt headed the cast.

=== West End premiere ===
The musical premiered in the West End at the Adelphi Theatre on April 15, 1975, and starred Jean Simmons, Joss Ackland, David Kernan, Liz Robertson, and Diane Langton, with Hermione Gingold reprising her role as Madame Armfeldt. It ran for 406 performances. During the run, Angela Baddeley replaced Gingold, and Virginia McKenna replaced Simmons.

=== 1989 West End revival ===
A revival opened in the West End on October 6, 1989, at the Piccadilly Theatre, directed by Ian Judge, designed by Mark Thompson, and choreographed by Anthony Van Laast. It starred Lila Kedrova as Madame Armfeldt, Dorothy Tutin as Desiree Armfeldt, Peter McEnery as Fredrik, and Susan Hampshire. The production ran for 144 performances, closing on February 17, 1990.

=== 1995 London revival ===
A revival by the Royal National Theatre opened at the Olivier Theatre on September 26, 1995. It was directed by Sean Mathias, with set design by Stephen Brimson Lewis, costumes by Nicky Gillibrand, lighting by Mark Henderson and choreography by Wayne McGregor. It starred Judi Dench (Desiree), Siân Phillips (Madame Armfeldt), Joanna Riding (Anne Egerman), Laurence Guittard (Fredrik Egerman), Patricia Hodge (Countess Charlotte) and Issy van Randwyck (Petra). The production closed on August 31, 1996. Dench received the Olivier Award for Best Actress in a Musical.

=== 2008 London revival ===
The third London revival ran at the Menier Chocolate Factory from November 22, 2008, until March 8, 2009. The production was directed by Trevor Nunn, with musical supervision by Caroline Humphris, choreography by Lynne Page, sets and costumes by David Farley and new orchestrations by Jason Carr. The cast included Hannah Waddingham as Desiree, Alexander Hanson as Frederik, Jessie Buckley (Anne), Maureen Lipman (Madame Armfeldt), Alistair Robins (the Count), Gabriel Vick (Henrik), Grace Link (Fredrika) and Kasia Hammarlund (Petra). This critically acclaimed production transferred to the Garrick Theatre in the West End for a limited season, opening on March 28, 2009, and running until July 25, 2009. The production then transferred to Broadway with a new cast.

=== 2009 Broadway revival ===
The 2008 Menier Chocolate Factory production opened on Broadway at the Walter Kerr Theatre in previews on November 24, 2009, and officially on December 13, 2009, with the same creative team. The cast was led by Angela Lansbury as Madame Armfeldt and, in her Broadway debut, Catherine Zeta-Jones as Desiree. Also featured were Alexander Hanson as Frederik, Ramona Mallory (the daughter of original Broadway cast members Victoria Mallory and Mark Lambert) as Anne, Hunter Ryan Herdlicka as Henrik, Leigh Ann Larkin as Petra, Erin Davie as the Countess, Aaron Lazar as the Count, and Bradley Dean as Frid. Zeta-Jones received the award for Best Leading Actress in a Musical at the 64th Tony Awards.

Originally, Katherine Doherty and Keaton Whittaker played Fredrika in alternating performances, beginning with the November 2009 previews. The official show album, which was recorded in January 2010, features both Doherty and Whittaker as Fredrika (on different songs). However, Katherine McNamara replaced Doherty in February 2010. McNamara and Whittaker stayed with the production until it ended in January 2011.

When the contracts of Zeta-Jones and Lansbury ended, the production closed temporarily on June 20, 2010, and resumed on July 13, with new stars Bernadette Peters as Desiree Armfeldt and Elaine Stritch as Madame Armfeldt. In an interview, Peters said that Sondheim had "proposed the idea to her this spring and urged the producers of the revival to cast her." Trevor Nunn directed rehearsals with the two new stars, and the rest of the original cast remained. Peters and Stritch extended their contracts until January 9, 2011, when the production closed with 20 previews and 425 regular performances. Before the production closed, it recouped its initial investment.

=== 2026 Royal Exchange Theatre revival ===
A Royal Exchange Theatre production in Manchester will be staged 5 December 2026 – 30 January 2027. Starring Michelle Gomez as Desiree Armfeldt, Michael D. Xavier as Fredrick, Gillian Bevan as Madame Armfeldt and Courtney Bowman as Petra. It will be directed by Selina Cartmell.

=== Europe ===
Zarah Leander played Madame Armfeldt in the original Austrian staging (in 1975) as well as in the original Swedish staging in Stockholm in 1978 (here with Jan Malmsjö as Fredrik Egerman). The successful Stockholm staging was directed by Stig Olin. In 2010 the musical was scheduled to return to Stockholm and the Stockholm Stadsteater. The cast included Pia Johansson, Dan Ekborg, Yvonne Lombard and Thérese Andersson.

The Théâtre du Châtelet, Paris production ran from February 15, 2010, through February 20, 2010. Lee Blakeley directed and Andrew George was the choreographer. Italian-born actress Greta Scacchi played Désirée, and Leslie Caron played Madame Armfeldt.

The Turku City Theatre staged the musical in 2011 with Kirsi Tarvainen in the role as Désirée. Tuomas Parkkinen directed and Jussi Vahvaselkä was musical director.

In 2019, the Nederlands Reisopera staged a version directed by Zack Winokur, with Susan Rigvava-Dumas playing Désirée.

=== Opera companies and concerts ===
The musical has also become part of the repertoire of a few opera companies. Michigan Opera Theatre was the first major American opera company to present the work in 1983, and again in November 2009. Light Opera Works (Evanston, Illinois) produced the work in August 1983. The New York City Opera staged it in 1990, 1991 and 2003, the Houston Grand Opera in 1999, the Los Angeles Opera in 2004, and Hartford Opera Theater in 2014. The New York City Opera's production in August 1990 and July 1991 (a total of 18 performances) won the 1990 Drama Desk Award for Outstanding Revival and was telecast on the PBS show Live at Lincoln Center on November 7, 1990. The cast included both stage performers: Sally Ann Howes and George Lee Andrews as Desiree and Frederik and opera regular Regina Resnik as Madame Armfeldt (in 1991).

The 2003 New York City Opera production featured a young Anna Kendrick as Fredrika Armfeldt, alongside Jeremy Irons as Frederik, Juliet Stevenson as Desiree, Claire Bloom as Madame Armfeldt, Danny Gurwin as Henrik, Michele Pawk as Charlotte, Jessica Boevers as Petra, Kristin Huxhold as Anne and Marc Kudisch as Carl-Magnus.

The 2003 production was revived at Los Angeles Opera in July 2004. Kudish, Pawk, Gurwin and Boevers returned alongside Judith Ivey as Desiree, Zoe Caldwell as Madame Armfeldt, Victor Garber as Frederik, Laura Benanti as Anne and Kristen Bell as Fredrika.

Opera Australia presented the piece in Melbourne in May 2009, starring Sigrid Thornton as Desiree Armfeldt and Nancye Hayes as Madame Armfeldt. The production returned in 2010 at the Sydney Opera House with Anthony Warlow taking on the role of Fredrik Egerman. The production was directed by Stuart Maunder, designed by Roger Kirk, and conducted by Andrew Greene. Opera Theatre of Saint Louis performed the musical in June 2010. Designer Isaac Mizrahi directed and designed the production, with a cast that included Amy Irving, Siân Phillips, and Ron Raines as Fredrik Egerman.

The piece has also become a popular choice for amateur musical theatre and light opera companies. In 2017, the musical was performed by students at The Royal Academy of Dramatic Art.

In June 2024, there was a concert presentation at David Geffen Hall in Lincoln Center with the Orchestra of St. Luke's using new orchestrations by Jonathan Tunick. The production starred star Susan Graham (Desiree Armfeldt), Cynthia Erivo (Petra), Ron Raines (Fredrik Egerman), Kerstin Anderson (Anne Egerman), Jonathan Christopher (Mr. Erlanson), Jason Gotay (Henrik Egerman), Ellie Fishman (Mrs. Nordstrom), Jin Ha (Frid), Addie Harrington (Fredrika Armfeldt), Shuler Hensley (Count Carl Magnus), Samantha Hill (Mrs. Segstrom), Andrea Jones-Sojola (Mrs. Anderson), Ross Lekites (Mr. Lindquist), Marsha Mason (Madam Armfeldt), and Ruthie Ann Miles (Countess Charlotte). The concert was produced by Jeff Berger, in association with Doug and Stacey Meyer, David and Ryan Belenzon, and Michael Lamon.

== Film ==
A film adaptation of A Little Night Music was released in 1977, with Cariou, Gingold, and Guittard reprising their broadway roles, alongside Elizabeth Taylor as Desiree, Lesley-Anne Down as Anne, and Diana Rigg as Charlotte. The setting was moved from Sweden to Austria. Sondheim wrote lyrics for the "Night Waltz" theme ("Love Takes Time") and an entirely new version of "The Glamorous Life", which has been incorporated into several subsequent productions of the stage musical. However, other songs, including "In Praise of Women", "The Miller's Son" and "Liaisons", were cut and remain heard only as background orchestrations.

The film marked Prince's second (and final) time as a motion picture director, following Something for Everyone. Critical reaction was mostly negative, with much being made of Taylor's wildly fluctuating weight from scene to scene. Some critics responded more positively, with Variety calling it "an elegant looking, period romantic charade". There was praise for Rigg, and orchestrator Jonathan Tunick received an Oscar for his work on the score. A soundtrack recording was released on LP, and a DVD release was issued in 2007.

== Music analysis ==
The score for A Little Night Music presents performance challenges more often seen in operetta or light opera pieces than in standard musical comedy. The demands made on the singing cast are considerable; although the vocal demands of the role of Desiree are rather small, most of the other singing roles require strong, legitimately trained voices with fairly wide ranges. Sondheim's liberal use of counterpoint extends to the vocal parts, including a free-structured round (the trio "Perpetual Anticipation") as well as songs in which characters engage in interior monologues or even overt dialogue simultaneously ("Now/Later/Soon", "A Weekend in the Country"). Critic Rex Reed noted that "The score of 'Night Music' ...contains patter songs, contrapuntal duets and trios, a quartet, and even a dramatic double quintet to puzzle through. All this has been gorgeously orchestrated by Jonathan Tunick; there is no rhythm section, only strings and woodwinds to carry the melodies and harmonies aloft."

Sondheim's engagement with threes extends to his lyrics. He organizes trios with the singers separated, while his duets are sung together, about a third person.

The work is performed as an operetta in many professional opera companies. For example, it was added to the New York City Opera Company repertoire in 1990.

=== 3/4 time ===
Most of the music in the show is written in waltz meter (3/4 time). Some parts adopt compound meter, with a time signature such as 12/8. Passages in "Overture", "Glamorous Life", "Liaisons", "Every Day A Little Death", and "The Miller's Son" are in duple meter.

=== Counterpoint and polyphony ===
At several points, Sondheim has multiple performers each sing a different song simultaneously. This use of counterpoint maintains coherence even as it extends the notion of a round, familiar in songs such as the traditional "Frère Jacques", into something more complex. Sondheim said: "As for the three songs ... going together well, I might as well confess. In those days I was just getting into contrapuntal and choral writing...and I wanted to develop my technique by writing a trio. What I didn't want to do is the quodlibet method...wouldn't it be nice to have three songs you don't think are going to go together, and they do go together ... The trick was the little vamp on "Soon" which has five-and six-note chords." Steve Swayne comments that the "contrapuntal episodes in the extended ensembles ... stand as testament to his interest in Counterpoint."

=== "Send In The Clowns" ===
The show's best-known and Sondheim's biggest hit song was almost an afterthought, written several days before the start of out-of-town tryouts. Sondheim initially conceived Desiree as a role for a more or less non-singing actress. When he discovered that the original Desiree, Glynis Johns, was able to sing (she had a "small, silvery voice") but could not "sustain a phrase", he devised the song "Send in the Clowns" for her in a way that would work around her vocal weakness, e.g., by ending lines with consonants that made for a short cut-off. "It is written in short phrases in order to be acted rather than sung ... tailor-made for Glynis Johns, who lacks the vocal power to sustain long phrases."

In analyzing the text of the song, Max Cryer wrote that it "is not intended to be sung by the young in love, but by a mature performer who has seen it all before. The song remains an anthem to regret for unwise decisions in the past and recognition that there's no need to send in the clowns – they're already here."

Graham Wolfe has argued, "What Desirée is referring to in the famous song is a conventional device to cover over a moment when something has gone wrong on stage. Midway through the second Act she has deviated from her usual script by suggesting to Fredrik the possibility of being together seriously and permanently, and, having been rejected, she falters as a show-person, finds herself bereft of the capacity to improvise and wittily cover. If Desirée could perform at this moment – revert to the innuendos, one-liners and blithe self-referential humour that constitutes her normal character – all would be well. She cannot, and what follows is an exemplary manifestation of Sondheim’s musico-dramatic complexity, his inclination to write music that performs drama. That is, what needs to be covered over (by the clowns sung about in the song) is the very intensity, ragged emotion and utter vulnerability that comes forward through the music and singing itself, a display protracted to six minutes, wrought with exposed silences, a shocked Fredrik sitting so uncomfortably before Desirée while something much too real emerges in a realm where he – and his audience – felt assured of performance."

=== Influences ===
There is a Mozart reference in the title—A Little Night Music is an occasionally used English translation of Eine kleine Nachtmusik, the nickname of Mozart's Serenade No. 13, K. 525. The elegant, harmonically-advanced music in this musical pays indirect homage to the compositions of Maurice Ravel, especially his Valses nobles et sentimentales (whose opening chord is borrowed for the opening chord of the song "Liaisons"); part of this effect stems from the style of orchestration that Jonathan Tunick used. There is also a direct quotation in "A Weekend in the Country" of Octavian's horn theme from Richard Strauss's Der Rosenkavalier, another comedy of manners with partner-swapping at its heart.

=== Orchestration ===
The original Broadway pit consisted of a 25-piece orchestra.

- Strings: 6 violins 2 viola, 2 cello, 1 bass, 1 harp
- Brass: 2 trumpets, 3 horns, 1 trombone
- Keyboards: 1 piano/celesta
- Woodwinds:
  - Reed 1: alto flute, flute, piccolo
  - Reed 2: clarinet, flute
  - Reed 3: bass clarinet, clarinet
  - Reed 4: English horn, oboe
  - Reed 5: bassoon, clarinet
- Percussion: (1 player) bells, crotales, snare drum, triangle, tympani, xylophone

The 2008 revival of the show modified the orchestrations to an 8-piece pit, re-orchestrated by Jason Carr.

- Strings: 1 violin 1 viola, 1 cello, 1 bass, 1 harp
- Keyboards: 1 piano/synthesizer
- Woodwinds: 1 player
  - Bassoon: 1 player

== Cast recordings ==
Cast recording of 1995 National Theatre revival starring Judi Dench

In addition to the original Broadway and London cast recordings, and the motion picture soundtrack (no longer available), there are recordings of the 1990 studio cast, the 1995 Royal National Theatre revival (starring Judi Dench), and the 2001 Barcelona cast recording sung in Catalan. In 1997 an all-jazz version of the score was recorded by Terry Trotter.

The 2009 Broadway revival with Catherine Zeta-Jones and Angela Lansbury recorded a cast album on January 4, 2010, which was released on April 6.

== Critical response ==
In his review of the original 1973 Broadway production, Clive Barnes in The New York Times called the musical "heady, civilized, sophisticated and enchanting." He noted that "the real triumph belongs to Stephen Sondheim...the music is a celebration of 3/4 time, an orgy of plaintively memorable waltzes, all talking of past loves and lost worlds...There is a peasant touch here." He commented that the lyrics are "breathtaking".

In its review of the 1989 London revival, the reviewer for The Guardian wrote that the "production also strikes me as infinitely superior to Harold Prince's 1975 version at the Adelphi. Mr Judge's great innovation is to transform the Liebeslieder Singers from the evening-dressed, after-dinner line-up into 18th century ghosts weaving in and out of the action...But Mr Judge's other great realisation is that, in Sondheim, the lyrics are not an adornment to a song but their very essence: understand them and the show will flow. Thus Dorothy Tutin as Desiree, the touring thesp eventually reunited with her quondam lover, is not the melting romantic of previous productions but a working mother with the sharpness of a hat-pin."

The Independent review of the 1995 National Theatre revival praised the production, writing "For three hours of gloriously barbed bliss and bewitchment, Sean Mathias's production establishes the show as a minor miracle of astringent worldly wisdom and one that is haunted by less earthy intimations." The review went on to state that "The heart of the production, in both senses, is Judi Dench's superb Desiree Armfeldt...Her husky-voiced rendering of "Send in the Clowns" is the most moving I've ever heard."

In reviewing the 2008 Menier Chocolate Factory production, the Telegraph reviewer wrote that "Sondheim's lyrics are often superbly witty, his music here, mostly in haunting waltz-time, far more accessible than is sometimes the case. The score positively throbs with love, regret and desire." But of the specific production, the reviewer went on to note: "But Nunn's production, on one of those hermetic sets largely consisting of doors and tarnished mirrors that have become such a cliché in recent years, never penetrates the work's subtly erotic heart. And as is often the case with this director's work, the pace is so slow and the mood so reverent, that initial enchantment gives way to bored fidgeting."

In his New York Times review of the 2009 Broadway production, Ben Brantley noted that "the expression that hovers over Trevor Nunn's revival...feels dangerously close to a smirk...It is a smirk shrouded in shadows. An elegiac darkness infuses this production." The production is "sparing on furniture and heavy on shadows", with "a scaled-down orchestra at lugubriously slowed-down tempos..." He goes on to write that "this somber, less-is-more approach could be effective were the ensemble plugged into the same rueful sensibility. But there is only one moment in this production when all its elements cohere perfectly. That moment, halfway through the first act, belongs to Ms. Lansbury, who has hitherto been perfectly entertaining, playing Madame Armfeldt with the overripe aristocratic condescension of a Lady Bracknell. Then comes her one solo, "Liaisons", in which her character thinks back on the art of love as a profession in a gilded age, when sex 'was but a pleasurable means to a measurable end.' Her face, with its glamour-gorgon makeup, softens, as Madame Armfeldt seems to melt into memory itself, and the wan stage light briefly appears to borrow radiance from her. It's a lovely example of the past reaching out to the present..."

Steven Suskin, reviewing the new Broadway cast for Variety, wrote "What a difference a diva makes. Bernadette Peters steps into the six-month-old revival of A Little Night Music with a transfixing performance, playing it as if she realizes her character's onstage billing -- "the one and only Desiree Armfeldt"—is clichéd hyperbole. By figuratively rolling her eyes at the hype, Peters gives us a rich, warm and comedically human Desiree, which reaches full impact when she pierces the façade with a nakedly honest, tears-on-cheek 'Send in the Clowns.'"

== Awards and nominations ==
=== Original Broadway production ===
Year	Award ceremony	Category	Nominee	Result
1973	Tony Award	Best Musical		Won
1973	Tony Award	Best Book of a Musical	Hugh Wheeler	Won
1973	Tony Award	Best Original Score	Stephen Sondheim	Won
1973	Tony Award	Best Performance by a Leading Actor in a Musical	Len Cariou	Nominated
1973	Tony Award	Best Performance by a Leading Actress in a Musical	Glynis Johns	Won
1973	Tony Award	Best Performance by a Featured Actor in a Musical	Laurence Guittard	Nominated
1973	Tony Award	Best Performance by a Featured Actress in a Musical	Patricia Elliott	Won
1973	Tony Award	Best Performance by a Featured Actress in a Musical	Hermione Gingold	Nominated
1973	Tony Award	Best Costume Design	Florence Klotz	Won
1973	Tony Award	Best Scenic Design	Boris Aronson	Nominated
1973	Tony Award	Best Lighting Design	Tharon Musser	Nominated
1973	Tony Award	Best Direction of a Musical	Harold Prince	Nominated
1973	Drama Desk Award	Outstanding Book of a Musical	Hugh Wheeler	Won
1973	Drama Desk Award	Outstanding Music	Stephen Sondheim	Won
1973	Drama Desk Award	Outstanding Lyrics	Stephen Sondheim	Won
1973	Drama Desk Award	Outstanding Actress in a Musical	Glynis Johns	Won
1973	Drama Desk Award	Outstanding Actress in a Musical	Patricia Elliott	Nominated
1973	Drama Desk Award	Outstanding Director	Harold Prince	Won
1973	Drama Desk Award	Most Promising Performer	D'Jamin Bartlett	Won
1973	Grammy Award	Best Musical Show Album		Won
1973	Theatre World Award		Laurence Guittard	Won
1973	Theatre World Award		Patricia Elliott	Won
1973	Theatre World Award		D'Jamin Bartlett	Won
1973	New York Drama Critics' Circle Award	Best Musical	Stephen Sondheim and Hugh Wheeler	Won

=== 1995 London revival ===
Year	Award ceremony	Category	Nominee	Result
1995	Laurence Olivier Award	Best Actress in a Musical	Judi Dench	Won
1995	Laurence Olivier Award	Best Performance in a Supporting Role in a Musical	Siân Phillips	Nominated
1995	Laurence Olivier Award	Best Theatre Choreographer	Wayne McGregor	Nominated
1995	Laurence Olivier Award	Best Costume Design	Nicky Gillibrand	Nominated

=== 2009 London revival ===
Year	Award ceremony	Category	Nominee	Result
2010	Laurence Olivier Award	Best Revival of a Musical		Nominated
2010	Laurence Olivier Award	Best Actress in a Musical	Hannah Waddingham	Nominated
2010	Laurence Olivier Award	Best Actor in a Musical	Alexander Hanson	Nominated
2010	Laurence Olivier Award	Best Performance in a Supporting role in a Musical	Maureen Lipman	Nominated
2010	Laurence Olivier Award	Best Performance in a Supporting role in a Musical	Kelly Price	Nominated

=== 2009 Broadway revival ===
Year	Award ceremony	Category	Nominee	Result
2010	Tony Award	Best Revival of a Musical		Nominated
2010	Tony Award	Best Performance by a Leading Actress in a Musical	Catherine Zeta-Jones	Won
2010	Tony Award	Best Performance by a Featured Actress in a Musical	Angela Lansbury	Nominated
2010	Tony Award	Best Sound Design	Dan Moses Schreier and Gareth Owen	Nominated
2010	Drama Desk Award	Outstanding Revival of a Musical		Nominated
2010	Drama Desk Award	Outstanding Actress in a Musical	Catherine Zeta-Jones	Won
2010	Drama Desk Award	Outstanding Featured Actress in a Musical	Angela Lansbury	Nominated
2010	Outer Critics Circle Award	Outstanding Revival of a Musical		Nominated
2010	Outer Critics Circle Award	Outstanding Actress in a Musical	Catherine Zeta-Jones	Won
2010	Outer Critics Circle Award	Outstanding Featured Actress in a Musical	Angela Lansbury	Nominated
2011	Grammy Award	Best Musical Show Album		Nominated
