= D'Jamin Bartlett =

American actress

D'Jamin Bartlett (also credited as D. Jamin-Bartlett; born Doris Jamin on May 21, 1946, New York City) is an American musical theatre actress. A native of The Bronx, she trained at the American Academy of Dramatic Arts. She has had an active career in theatre since the early 1960s. She won a Drama Desk Award for her portrayal of Petra in the original Broadway production of Stephen Sondheim's A Little Night Music in 1974. Active predominantly in New York during her early career, in recent years she has worked in theaters in South Florida.

== Early life and career ==
Doris Jamin was born on May 21, 1946 in New York City. She grew up in The Bronx. Her father was an auto mechanic and her mother a typist. She trained for the stage at the American Academy of Dramatic Arts (AADA). She began performing professionally while a high school student, and made her professional stage debut in upstate New York in the early 1960s. Early in her career she performed under her birth name in productions at the Blackfriars Theatre in Rochester, New York, and in other regional theaters. She married Bill Bartlett, a fellow student at AADA. Bill became a playwright, and their daughter is the actress Alison Bartlett who has been a longtime regular performer as Gina on Sesame Street.

In 1964 Jamin made her Off-Broadway debut with the Next Stage Theatre Company in the musical Unfinished Business. In 1965 she appeared as The Girl (aka Luisa) in The Fantasticks in a production at the Spa Music Theatre in Glens Falls, New York with a cast that included Gil Robbins as the narrator. She also performed the roles of Polly Peachum in The Threepenny Opera, Kathy in The Student Prince, Liesl von Trapp in The Sound of Music, and Mitzi in Blossom Time with that same company. In 1967 she appeared Off-Broadway at the Jan Hus Playhouse as the maid (replacing Alice Cannon) in Man with a Load of Mischief. In 1970 she reprised her role in Fantasticks at the Playhouse on the Mall in Paramus, New Jersey.

== Later career ==
In 1971-1972 Doris performed at Ford's Theatre in Washington, D.C. in a production of Godspell. While performing in this production, Bartlett was invited to audition for A Little Night Music by the office of Harold Prince. She flew to Boston to sing an audition piece for Stephen Sondheim and Prince. They gave her the role of Petra, replacing another actress who had been having trouble with "The Miller's Son", Petra's musical number in the show.

A Little Night Music premiered in Boston, Massachusetts before transferring to the Shubert Theatre on Broadway. Bartlett made her Broadway debut with the show on February 25, 1973. She changed her stage name to D'Jamin Bartlett; first using it for her appearance in Follies.During this Broadway run, Bartlett appeared on The Tonight Show Starring Johnny Carson on 10 May 1973. Bartlett's performance in A Little Night Music earned her the 1974 Drama Desk Award for Most Promising Performer.

After A Little Night Music, Bartlett toured in the National Company of the show. Bartlett's only other Broadway performance came in the 1975 production of Boccaccio at the Edison Theatre. Other venues at which Bartlett has performed include the Studio Arena Theater in 1974, The Village Gate in 1976, the National Theatre in 1978, and the Pittsburgh Civic Light Opera in 1979. She has also toured in the roles of Eliza in My Fair Lady and Fastrada in Pippin.

In 1990-1991 Bartlett performed the role of Maria in the national tour Lend Me a Tenor; giving performances at venues like the Shubert Theatre in Connecticut the Palace Theatre in Cleveland, Ohio, and the Van Wezel Performing Arts Hall in Florida among others. In 1992 she portrayed Bunny in The House of Blue Leaves at the Cincinnati Playhouse in the Park, and in 1993 she appeared as Aldonza in Man of La Mancha at the Art and Culture Center of Hollywood.

With songwriter George Barrie, Bartlett created the musical Nightsong which was given its world premiere at the Hollywood Boulevard Theatre in 1998 with Bartlett in the role of Angelina. She has continued to perform periodically in shows in South Florida; most recently in Confessions of a Retired Witch at The Studio in Mizner Park in Boca Raton, Florida in 2025.
