= Derry Power =

Irish actor (1935–2025)

- Born: 29 March 1935
- Died: 5 September 2025 (aged 90)
- Occupation: Actor
- Years active: 1961–2025

Derry Power (29 March 1935 – 5 September 2025) was an Irish actor.

== Life and career ==
Born in Youghal, County Cork on 29 March 1935, he appeared in the first production of Brendan Behan's The Quare Fellow at Dublin's Pike Theatre in 1954. He is best known for playing management genius Seamus Finnegan in the BBC Television sitcom The Fall and Rise of Reginald Perrin, with the classic line "Would you be having a joke there with a simple, tongue-tied Irishman from the land of the bogs and the little people?" In a long stage career, he featured in many plays in the Abbey Theatre; he appeared in TV series from Z-Cars to Ballykissangel and in many films made in Ireland.

In 2016, he starred with Des Keogh in the play The Quiet Land by Malachy McKenna.

Power also appeared in Super Gran as the fabulous o Finnegan in 1985. He died on 5 September 2025, at the age of 90.

== Selected filmography ==
- Never Put It in Writing (1964)
- Underground (1970)
- Warlords of Atlantis (1978)
- Educating Rita (1983)
- Rawhead Rex (1986)
- My Left Foot (1989)
- Far and Away (1992)
- September (1996) as Barman
- Disco Pigs (2001)
- The Tiger's Tail (2006)
