= Natural Enemies =

- Directed by: Jeff Kanew
- Written by: Jeff Kanew
- Based on: Natural Enemies by Julius Horwitz
- Produced by: John E. Quill
- Starring: Hal Holbrook; Louise Fletcher; Viveca Lindfors; José Ferrer
- Cinematography: Richard E. Brooks
- Edited by: Jeff Kanew
- Music by: Don Ellis
- Production company: Utopia
- Distributed by: Cinema 5 Distributing
- Release date: November 1, 1979
- Running time: 100 minutes
- Country: United States
- Language: English
- Budget: $700,000

Natural Enemies is a 1979 American drama film directed by Jeff Kanew based on the 1975 novel Natural Enemies written by Julius Horwitz. The film stars Hal Holbrook and Louise Fletcher as a married couple whose relationship is strained and threatened by the husband's interest in getting rid of his wife, including resorting to murder. The man Paul (Hal Holbrook) spends the day reflecting on his past decisions and indulging in long-held desires before returning home to his family, having decided what he will do.

== Summary ==
Paul Steward is a 48 year old magazine editor who in his words wishes he could rewrite his life. As the film opens he is standing by his bed in his isolated Connecticut farmhouse after a sleepless night as his alarm clock ticks saying that this is the day he will take a rifle and kill his wife, three children and then himself. In his narration, Steward professes that all men for various reasons have thought about killing their families. He mentions that he and his wife Miriam have not slept together in eight months. Miriam has attempted suicide and has a history of instability having had shock treatments. As she drives him to the train station, Steward laments that there is no longer tenderness between them and that they are only married because of the children. Steward meets a former astronaut at work who wants to write an article for him. As he interviews the man, Steward is intrigued by his description of loneliness on the moon and feels the connection to his own inner torment. Steward talks to a friend at the office about men who kill their families and what it means. His friend is a Holocaust survivor who is frustrated that so many have forgotten the horrors of Nazi Germany. Steward hires five hookers to service him in a final act of indulgence on his last day. He shares memories with them of his and Miriam's life together, and of their failing relationship. In the film's shocking conclusion a radio voiceover reveals that Paul indeed followed through with his murder-suicide scenario.

== Cast ==
- Hal Holbrook as Paul Steward
- Louise Fletcher as Miriam Steward
- Peter Armstrong as Tony Steward
- Elizabeth Berridge as Sheila Steward
- Stephen Austin as Alex Steward
- Jim Pappas as Fred Russo
- Ellen Barber as Anne
- John Bartholomew as Arthur Eaton
- Charles Randall as Doctor
- José Ferrer as Harry Rosenthal
- Lisa Carroll as The Madam
- June Berry as Jan
- Alisha Fontaine as Sharon
- Patricia Mauceri as Patricia
- Michele O'Brien as Leslie
- Claire Reilly as Gloria
- Viveca Lindfors as Dr. Baker
- Frank Bongiorno as Taxi Driver
- Harry Daley as Conductor
- Patricia Elliott as Woman on Train
- Robert Perry as Newscaster
- Casey Kanew as The Dog

== Reception ==
Film historian Leonard Maltin gave the picture 1.5 out of a possible 4 stars; he denounced the movie as "Cold and uninvolving, not to mention strange..." Screenwriting instructor Irwin Blacker seemed to agree, calling the film "...a total failure, despite good performances and direction, since the Holbrook character fails to make any moral decision; rather than confronting and resolving the issues behind his discontent, he evades them."
