= George Lee Andrews =

American actor and singer

- Born: October 13, 1942 (age 83); Milwaukee, Wisconsin, U.S.
- Occupations: Actor, singer
- Years active: 1972–2015
- Known for: The Phantom of the Opera
- Spouse: Marti Morris (m. 1976)

George Lee Andrews (born October 13, 1942, Milwaukee, Wisconsin) is an American actor and singer. He holds the Guinness World Record for the most performances in the same Broadway show, having appeared in the musical The Phantom of the Opera on 9,382 occasions over a period of 23 years; he was in the original Broadway cast of the show and took over the role of Richard Firmin from 1990 to 2001, he then switched roles with Jeff Keller and played Gilles André from 2001 to 2011.

He made his Broadway debut as Frid in the original production of A Little Night Music, and later appeared in the original productions of On the Twentieth Century, Merlin, and The Phantom of the Opera, and in the revival of Evita. He returned to A Little Night Music in 1990, this time in the leading role of Frederick Egerman at the New York City Opera.

From 1979 to 1980, he played El Gallo in The Fantasticks. In 1986, he played King Arthur in Camelot.

== Credits ==
Year(s)	Production	Role	Notes
1972	Comedy	Serino	Out-of-town tryout
1973	A Little Night Music	Frid	Broadway
1974	A Little Night Music	Fredrik Egerman	National Tour
1978–1979	On the Twentieth Century	Mac Jacobs u/s Oscar Jaffee	Broadway
1979–1980	The Fantasticks	El Gallo	Off-Broadway
1983	Merlin	Old Merlin / Old Soldier	Broadway
1983	Shine! The Horatio Alger Musical	Luke Gerrish	Virginia Museum Theatre
1985	Man of La Mancha	Miguel de Cervantes / Don Quixote	Country Dinner Playhouse
1985	Evita	Juan Peron	An Evening Dinner Theatre
1985–1986	Pieces of Eight	Billy Bones / Captain Alexander Smollett	Out-of-town tryout
1986	Camelot	King Arthur	Marriott Theatre
1987–1988	Candide	Voltaire / Dr. Pangloss	Arizona Theatre Company
1988–1989	The Phantom of the Opera	Don Attilio / Passarino u/s Firmin and André	Broadway
1990–2001	The Phantom of the Opera	Monsieur Richard Firmin	Broadway
2001–2011	The Phantom of the Opera	Monsieur Gilles André	Broadway
1990–1991	A Little Night Music	Fredrik Egerman	New York City Opera
1998	Annie Get Your Gun	Foster Wilson / Pawnee Bill	Concert
2010	Paradise Found	Grand Vizier / Soap Manufacturer	Menier Chocolate Factory
2012	Evita	Ensemble	Broadway
