= Victoria Mallory =

American singer and actress (1948–2014)

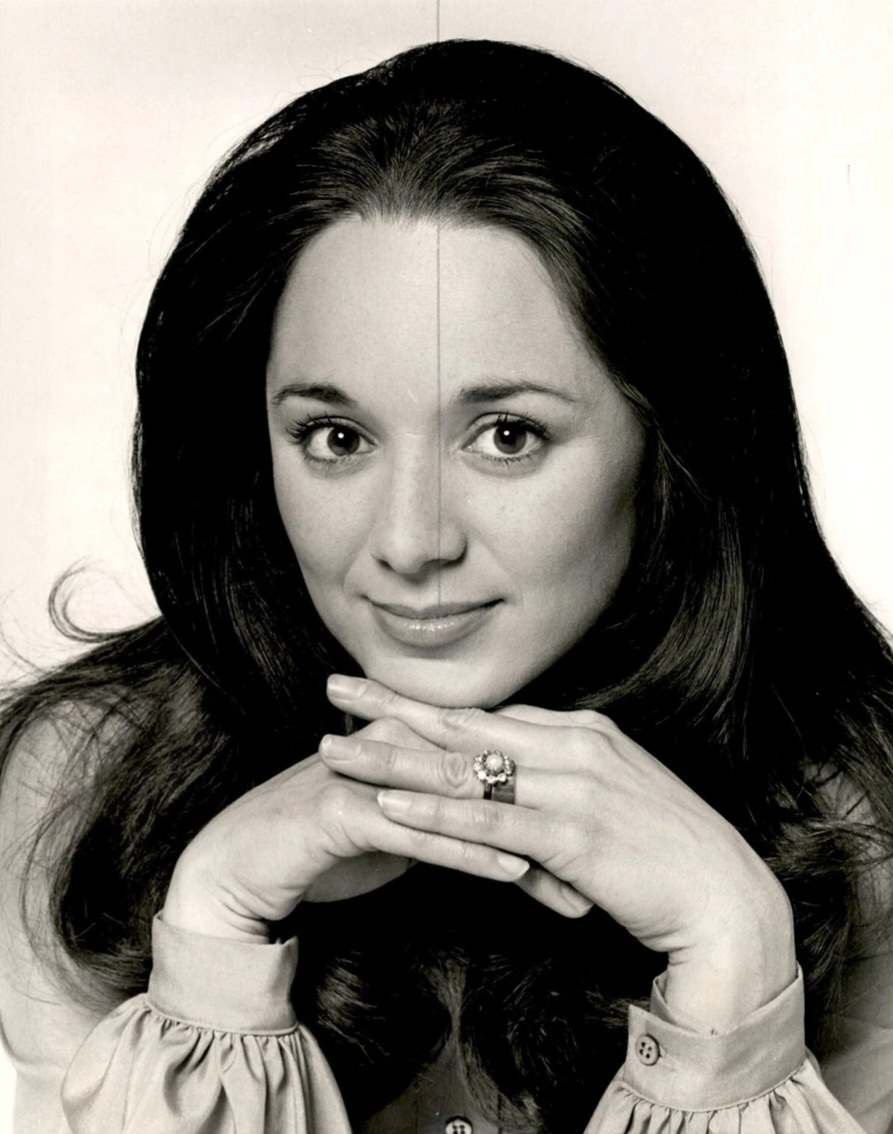
- Mallory in The Young and the Restless, 1978
- Born: Victoria Morales; September 20, 1948; Richmond, Virginia, U.S.
- Died: August 30, 2014 (aged 65)
- Other name: Vicki Morales
- Occupations: Singer, actress
- Spouse: Mark Lambert (m. 1975)
- Children: 1

Victoria Mallory (September 20, 1948 – August 30, 2014) was an American singer and actress, best known for originating the role of Anne Egerman in the Broadway musical A Little Night Music. She was also an accomplished martial artist and model.

== Early life and education ==
Her parents were Ruby Mallory and Mario Morales. Her father was from the Philippines, and her mother was from Virginia.

Mallory was a native of Richmond, Virginia. While she was still a child, the family moved to Columbus, Georgia, where Mallory graduated from Baker High School in 1966. She sometimes was credited as Vicki Morales, a variant of her birth name, Victoria Morales. She said she did twenty musicals during high school (including at some local theaters), in addition to playing piano and dancing. After high school she went to New York to help her former teacher in a production of Little Mary Sunshine and decided to stay, enrolling at the American Musical and Dramatic Academy (AMDA), where she met future co-star Kurt Peterson.

== Theatre career ==
Mallory came to fame when appearing on Broadway in the 1970s with parts in three Stephen Sondheim musicals: she starred as Maria in the first revival of West Side Story at Lincoln Center (1968), had a small role in Follies (1971) as Young Heidi, and starred in A Little Night Music as Anne Egerman (1973–74). She also starred in the 1968 revival of Carnival! at New York City Center. Mallory recounted that at her audition for Follies, producer Harold Prince told her there wasn't a part that fit her, to which she replied that she would do anything to be in the show. Prince hired her, and during rehearsals, the role of Young Heidi was developed for her and added to the show, with choreographer Michael Bennett adding her to the dance numbers and Sondheim writing "One More Kiss" to be her big number. Mallory said that Prince hired her for A Little Night Music after having her read just one line of the script and that she was the first cast member hired.

She performed with, among others, the Los Angeles Civic Light Opera, the Pittsburgh CLO, the St. Louis Municipal Opera (The Muny), Atlanta's Theater Of The Stars, Kansas City Starlight, Dallas Summer Musicals, Utah's Pioneer Theatre Company, the Irish Repertory Theatre (NYC), etc.

== Television career ==
On television, she was best known for her role as Leslie Brooks on the soap opera The Young and the Restless, which she took over from Janice Lynde in 1977. She left the series in 1982, coming back for a guest stint in 1984. In 1991, she had a brief stint as Dr. Denise Foxworthy on the soap opera Santa Barbara. After that, she made numerous guest appearances on television series, including Everwood, Touched by an Angel, and Promised Land, among other movie and theatrical appearances.

== Martial arts ==
Mallory also became competent in tai chi, and served as a model in the many martial arts photographs in a book by Marshall Ho'o, who wrote of her: "I also wish to express my gratitude to Victoria Mallory who appears with me in the photos of this book. She is a highly accomplished actress whose tai chi is sheer perfection."

== Personal life ==
Mallory had been married to her A Little Night Music co-star Mark Lambert since 1975. Mallory says that they fell in love during the run of the show and that every night they would watch Glynis Johns sing "Send in the Clowns" together.

The couple had a daughter named Ramona Mallory, also an actress. Ramona starred as Luisa in an Off-Broadway production of The Fantasticks and in the 2009 Broadway revival of A Little Night Music, recreating the role of Anne Egerman, which her mother originated 36 years earlier.

== Death ==
In August 2014, it was reported Mallory was battling pancreatic cancer. She died on August 30, 2014, just 20 days prior to her 66th birthday.

Mallory's own mother, Ruby Morales, had died three weeks earlier, on August 5, 2014, at age 86. Ruby Morales was interred with her husband, Mario, a former Army musician.
