= Leigh Ann Larkin =

American actress and singer (born 1980)

- Born: Leigh Ann Wielgus c. 1980 (age 44–45); Pittsburgh, Pennsylvania
- Education: Cincinnati College-Conservatory of Music
- Occupation(s): Actress, Singer

Leigh Ann Larkin (born c. 1980) is an American actress and singer, best known for her performance as June Havoc in the 2008 Broadway revival of the musical, Gypsy.

== Early life and education ==
Larkin was born Leigh Ann Wielgus on April 14 in Pittsburgh, Pennsylvania. She graduated from North Hills High School in 1998. Larkin went on to study musical theater at the University of Cincinnati – College-Conservatory of Music, graduating in 2002. Shortly after, she moved to Manhattan.

== Career ==
Larkin appeared in the Disney Theatrical national tour of On the Record, and returned to Pittsburgh in May 2007 to star as Belle in Beauty and the Beast at the Pittsburgh Musical Theater. She was seen on television in 2008 as Pepper Gleason on Lipstick Jungle, as well as in The Flight of the Conchords in 2009 and in Elementary in December 2012.

In 2007, Larkin performed the role of June Havoc in the Encores! revival of Gypsy: A Musical Fable, from July 9 to 29, 2007. The Encores! production transferred to Broadway, where it opened at the St. James Theatre on March 27, 2008, despite Ben Brantley's slightly negative review in The New York Times. The show was originally scheduled to close in March 2009 on Patti Lupone's final performance, but closed on January 11, 2009 due to decreases in ticket sales. Larkin described her audition process in a March 2008 interview with Broadway.com:

Larkin first met Gypsy's legendary librettist Arthur Laurents at her audition for last summer's Encores! production ... "I didn't know the show," she admits, "and Arthur is the kind of director who knows exactly what he wants. At first he was not pleased with me at all," she says with an all's-well-that-ends-well giggle. "He said, ‘You're too emotional; June is bored, she's over it.' Then he turned to someone at the table and said, ‘She couldn't take direction if she was paid.'" Turns out Laurents was just trying to elicit a strong performance from an actress he secretly liked. It worked: After Larkin plowed through an entire number, the 89-year-old director said, "That's what I wanted."

Larkin next played the role of Petra in the 2009 Broadway revival of A Little Night Music, starring Angela Lansbury and Catherine Zeta-Jones. The revival opened at the Walter Kerr Theatre on December 13, 2009. The production temporarily closed on June 20, 2010, and resumed on July 13, with new stars Bernadette Peters as Desiree Armfeldt and Elaine Stritch as Madame Armfeldt. Peters and Stritch extended their contracts until January 9, 2011, when the production closed with 20 previews and 425 regular performances.
