= Hugh Wheeler =

British novelist, screenwriter, librettist, poet and translator (1912–1987)

- Born: 19 March 1912; London, England
- Died: 26 July 1987 (aged 75); Pittsfield, Massachusetts, US
- Citizenship: United Kingdom; United States
- Education: University of London
- Occupations: Novelist; screenwriter; dramatist; poet

Hugh Callingham Wheeler (19 March 1912 – 26 July 1987) was a British-American novelist, screenwriter, librettist, poet and translator. Born in London, he moved to the United States as a young man, and became a naturalized citizen in 1942. He had attended London University.

== Life and career ==
Under the noms de plume Patrick Quentin, Q. Patrick and Jonathan Stagge, Wheeler was the author or co-author of many mystery novels and short stories. In 1963, his 1961 collection, The Ordeal of Mrs. Snow was given a Special Edgar Award by the Mystery Writers of America. He won the Tony Award and the Drama Desk Award for Outstanding Book of a Musical in 1973 and 1974 for his books for the musicals A Little Night Music and Candide, and won both again in 1979 for his book for Sweeney Todd.

Wheeler is credited as "research consultant" for the film Cabaret, though numerous sources list him as co-writer of the screenplay, and even ultimately responsible for the shooting script (WGA regulations would have had to have been challenged to give him a writing credit on screen.)

A resident of Monterey, Massachusetts, Wheeler died from respiratory failure and heart failure at Berkshire Medical Center in Pittsfield, Massachusetts, on 26 July 1987, aged 75.

== Stage musical credits ==
- Candide (1973)
- Irene (new libretto) (1973)
- A Little Night Music (1973)
- Truckload (1975)
- Pacific Overtures ("additional material") (1976)
- Sweeney Todd (1979) (based on a version of the play by Christopher Bond)
- The Little Prince and the Aviator (1982)
- Meet Me in St. Louis (1989)

== Plays ==
- Big Fish, Little Fish (1961)
- Look, We've Come Through (1961)
- We Have Always Lived in the Castle (1966)

== Screenplays ==
- Something for Everyone (1970)
- Travels with My Aunt (1972)
- A Little Night Music (1978)
- Nijinsky (1980)

== Novels ==
- The Crippled Muse (1951)

== Awards and achievements ==
Year	Award	Category	Work	Result	Ref
1973	Tony Award	Best Book of a Musical	A Little Night Music	Won	
1973	Drama Desk Award	Outstanding Book of a Musical	A Little Night Music	Won	
1973	New York Drama Critics' Circle Award	Best Musical	A Little Night Music	Won	
1974	Tony Award	Best Book of a Musical	Candide	Won	
1974	Drama Desk Award	Outstanding Book of a Musical	Candide	Won	
1974	New York Drama Critics' Circle Award	Best Musical	Candide	Won	
1976	New York Drama Critics' Circle Award	Best Musical	Pacific Overtures	Won	
1979	Tony Award	Best Book of a Musical	Sweeney Todd	Won	
1979	Drama Desk Award	Outstanding Book of a Musical	Sweeney Todd	Won	
1979	New York Drama Critics' Circle Award	Best Musical	Sweeney Todd	Won	
1990	Tony Award	Best Book of a Musical	Meet Me in St. Louis	Nominated	
