= Jeff Kanew =

American film director (born 1944)

- Born: Jeffrey Roger Kanew; December 16, 1944 (age 81); New York City, New York, U.S.
- Occupations: Film director, screenwriter, film editor, film producer
- Children: Justin Kanew

Jeffrey Roger Kanew (born December 16, 1944) is an American film director, screenwriter, film producer and film editor who early in his career made trailers for many films of the 1970s and is probably best known for directing the film Revenge of the Nerds (1984) and for editing Ordinary People (1980).

Kanew directed Gotcha! (1985) starring Anthony Edwards and Linda Fiorentino, and Tough Guys (1986), the final film pairing actors Kirk Douglas and Burt Lancaster; Kanew had also directed Douglas in Eddie Macon's Run (1983). His other directorial efforts include Troop Beverly Hills (1989) starring Shelley Long, V.I. Warshawski (1991) starring Kathleen Turner, Natural Enemies (1979) starring Hal Holbrook and Louise Fletcher, Babij Jar (2003), a Holocaust drama, National Lampoon's Adam & Eve (2005), several TV episodes, and versions for the stage and video of the Kirk Douglas one-man show Before I Forget (2009).

Kanew also directed the documentary Black Rodeo (1972), capturing the events surrounding the first ever performance of an all-black rodeo at Triborough Stadium on Randall's Island, New York.

Kanew's son Justin Kanew is a reality show contestant from season 15 and season 18 of The Amazing Race. Justin was also the Democratic candidate for Congress in Tennessee's 7th District in the 2018 midterm election.
