= Hermione Gingold =

English actress (1897–1987)

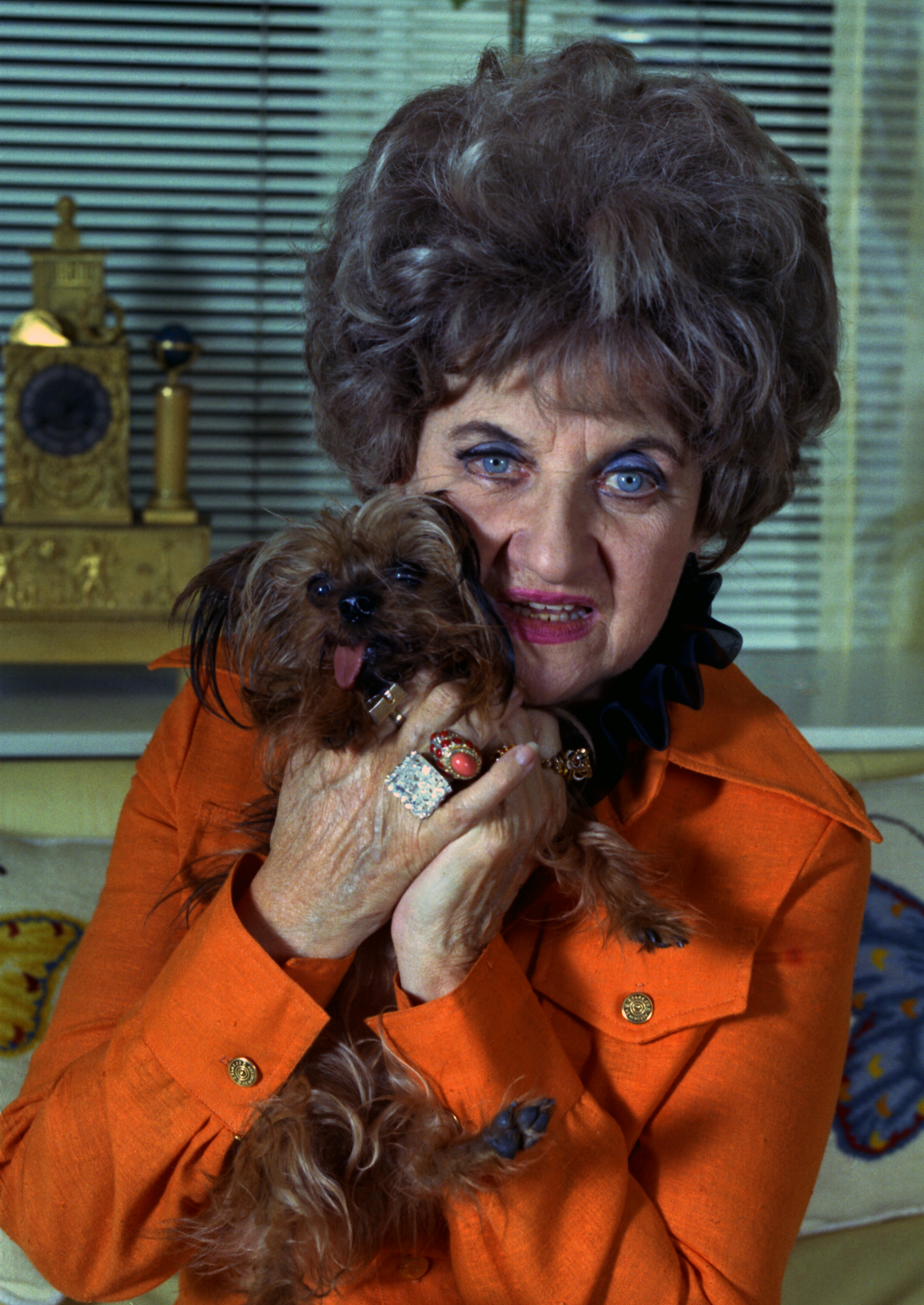
- Gingold in 1973, by Allan Warren
- Born: Hermione Ferdinanda Gingold; 9 December 1897; Maida Vale, London, England
- Died: 24 May 1987 (aged 89); New York City, U.S.
- Resting place: Forest Lawn Memorial Park Glendale, California, U.S.
- Occupation: Actress
- Years active: 1909–1984
- Spouses: Michael Joseph (m. 1918; div. 1926) Eric Maschwitz (m. 1926; div. 1945)
- Children: 2

Hermione Ferdinanda Gingold (/ˈɡɪŋɡoʊld/; 9 December 1897 – 24 May 1987) was an English actress known for her deep, drawling voice and the sharp-tongued, eccentric characters she often played.

After success as a child actress, she established a stage career spanning comedy, drama, experimental theatre, and radio broadcasting. Finding her milieu in revue, she played from the 1930s to the 1950s, co-starring several times with English actress Hermione Baddeley. Later, she played formidable elders in the film and stage musicals Gigi (1958), Bell, Book and Candle (1958), The Music Man (1962), and A Little Night Music (1977).

From the early 1950s, Gingold lived and made her career mostly in the U.S. Her American stage work ranged from John Murray Anderson's Almanac (1953) to Oh Dad, Poor Dad, Mamma's Hung You in the Closet and I'm Feelin' So Sad (1963), the latter of which she played in London. She became a well-known guest on television talk shows. She made appearances in revues and toured in plays and musicals until an accident ended her performing career in 1977.

== Biography ==
=== Early years ===
Hermione Ferdinanda Gingold was born in Carlton Hill, Maida Vale, London, the elder daughter of a prosperous Austrian-born Jewish stockbroker, James Gingold, and his wife, Kate Frances (née Walter). Her paternal grandparents were the Ottoman-born British subject Moritz "Maurice" Gingold, a London stockbroker, and his Austrian-born wife, Hermine, after whom Hermione was named (Gingold mentions in her autobiography that her mother might have gotten 'Hermione' from Shakespeare's play The Winter's Tale, which she was reading shortly before her birth). On her father's side, she was descended from Solomon Sulzer, a synagogue cantor and Jewish liturgical composer in Vienna. James felt that religion was something children needed to decide on for themselves, and Gingold grew up with no particular religious beliefs.

Gingold's professional début was in 1908, when she had just turned 11. She played the herald in Herbert Beerbohm Tree's production of Pinkie and the Fairies by W. Graham Robertson, in a cast including Ellen Terry, Frederick Volpe, Marie Löhr, and Viola Tree. She was promoted to the leading role of Pinkie for a provincial tour. Tree cast her as Falstaff's page, Robin, in The Merry Wives of Windsor. She attended Rosina Filippi's stage school in London. In 1911, she was cast in the original production of Where the Rainbow Ends, which opened to very good reviews on 21 December 1911.

On 10 December 1912, the day after her 15th birthday, Gingold played Cassandra in William Poel's production of Troilus and Cressida at the King's Hall, Covent Garden, with Esmé Percy as Troilus and Edith Evans as Cressida. The following year, she appeared in a musical production, The Marriage Market, in a small role in a cast that included Tom Walls, W H Berry, and Gertie Millar. In 1914, she played Jessica in The Merchant of Venice at The Old Vic. In 1918, Gingold married publisher Michael Joseph, with whom she had two sons, the younger of whom, Stephen, became a pioneer of theatre-in-the-round in Britain.

=== 1920 to 1948 ===
Gingold's adult stage career was slow to take off. She played Liza in If at the Ambassadors in May 1921, and the Old Woman in Ben Travers's farcical comedy The Dippers produced by Sir Charles Hawtrey at the Criterion in August 1922.

In 1926, Gingold was divorced from Joseph. Later in the same year, she married writer and lyricist Eric Maschwitz, whom she divorced in 1945. She underwent a vocal crisis in the late 1920s and early 1930s; she had hitherto described herself as "Shakespearian and soprano", but nodules on her vocal cords brought a drastic drop in pitch, about which she commented, "One morning it was Mozart and the next 'Old Man River'". Critic J. C. Trewin described her voice as "powdered glass in deep syrup". During this period, she broadcast frequently for the BBC and established herself at the experimental theatre-club the Gate Theatre Studio in London, first as a serious actress and later in the genre for which she became famous, revue. According to The Times, in Spread It Abroad (1936), a revue at another theatre, the Saville, with material by Herbert Farjeon, she found her milieu.

In the 10 years from 1938, Gingold concentrated on revues, appearing in nine productions in the West End. The first four were The Gate Revue (transferred from the Gate to the Ambassadors, 1939), Swinging the Gate (1940), Rise Above It (1941), and Sky High (1942). During this period, Hermione Baddeley and she established a stage partnership that The Times called "briskly sustained mock-rivalry". Their names were often linked for this reason, although they only ever appeared in three shows together. In June 1943, she opened in a revue, Sweet and Low, which was revised and refreshed over a run of almost six years, first as Sweeter and Lower and then Sweetest and Lowest. In her sketches, as Alan Melville recalled, she tended to portray "grotesque and usually unfortunate ladies of dubious age and occasionally, morals; the unhappy female painted by Picasso who found herself lumbered with an extra limb or two … the even less fortunate female who, after years of playing the cello in Palm Court orchestras, ended up bow-legged beyond belief". In a biographical sketch, Ned Sherrin wrote, "Gingold became a special attraction for American soldiers and 'Thanks, Yanks' was one of her most appropriate numbers. During the astringent, name-dropping 'Sweet' series, she played 1,676 performances, before 800,000 people, negotiating 17,010 costume changes".

=== Postwar ===
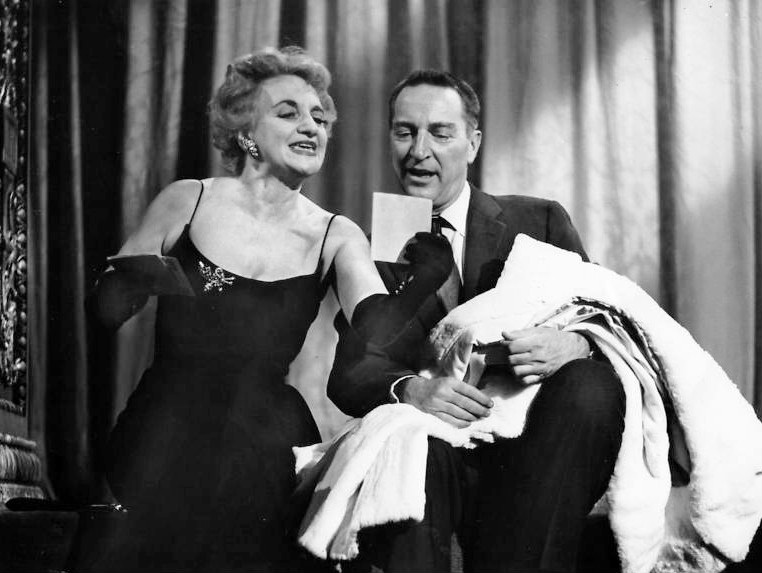
Gingold as a guest on I've Got a Secret with host Garry Moore

Gingold's first new revue after the war was Slings and Arrows at the Comedy in 1948. She was praised, but the material was judged inferior to that of her earlier shows.

Gingold and Baddeley co-starred in a Noël Coward double bill in November 1949, presenting Fumed Oak and Fallen Angels. Reviews were poor, and Coward thought the performances crude and overdone, but the production was a box-office success, running until August the following year. She cited working in interior decoration and collecting china as her hobbies in 1951.

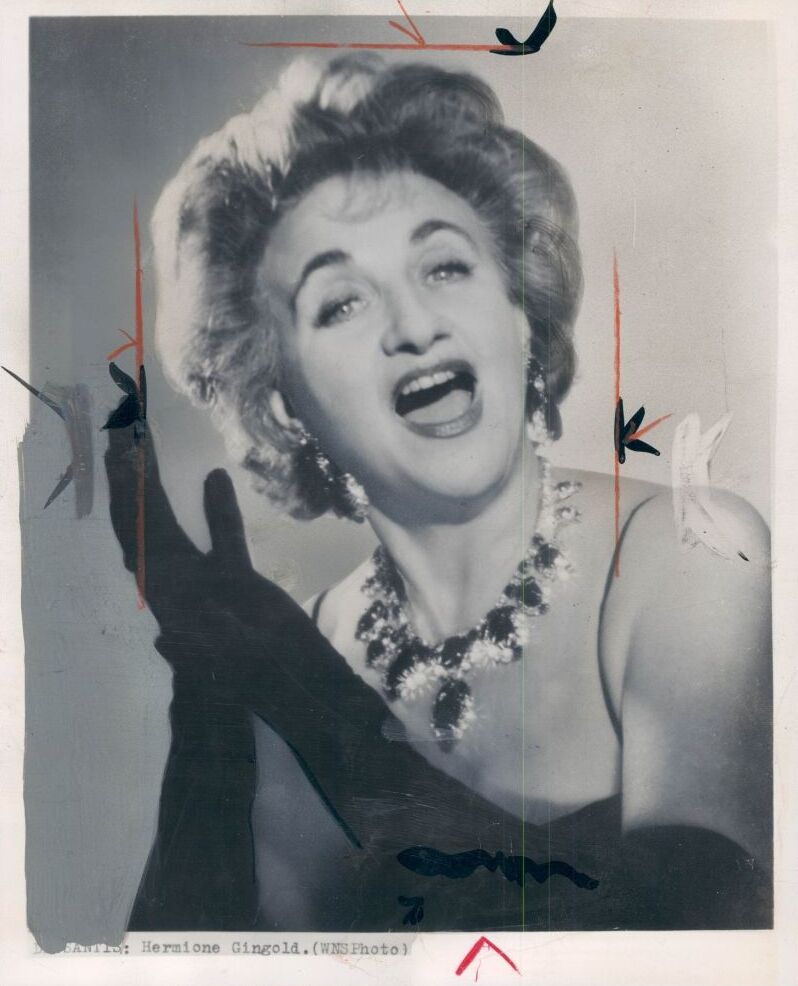
Gingold in the 1950s

She appeared in cameo roles in British films, of which Sherrin singles out The Pickwick Papers (1952), in which she played the formidable schoolmistress, Miss Tompkins. Gingold became well known to BBC radio audiences in "Mrs Doom's Diary" in the weekly show Monday Night at Eight; this was a parody of the radio soap opera Mrs Dale's Diary in the manner of the Addams Family with Gingold as Drusilla Doom and Alfred Marks as her sepulchral husband.

Between 1951 and 1969, Gingold worked mostly in the US. Her first engagement there was at the Brattle Theatre in Cambridge, Massachusetts, in It's About Time, a revue that incorporated some of her London material. In December 1953, she opened in John Murray Anderson's Almanac, which made her an instant Broadway success and for which she won the Donaldson Award in 1954. She also became a regular guest on talk shows. Her jazz cabaret album la gingold, with musical direction by Buster Davis, was released in 1956.

She continued making films, playing a London "sporting lady" in Around the World in 80 Days (1956), and won a Golden Globe Award for Best Supporting Actress for her performance in the 1958 film Gigi. In the film, she sang "I Remember It Well" with Maurice Chevalier. She said, "It was my first American film, and I was very nervous." Chevalier put her at ease. "I had to sing, and I hadn't got a great voice, but with him, I felt [like] the greatest prima donna in the world." Gingold followed this with another hit film, Bell, Book and Candle, also 1958. She played the haughty Eulalie Mackecknie Shinn in The Music Man (1962), starring Robert Preston and Shirley Jones.

In October 1963, Gingold opened in Arthur Kopit's Oh Dad, Poor Dad, Mamma's Hung You in the Closet and I'm Feelin' So Sad, playing a monstrously possessive mother driving her son crazy. She played the role in the London production in 1965. Reviewing the latter, and noting that the first night had been greeted with cheering at the end, critic Philip Hope-Wallace wrote:

It marks, of course, the return of Hermione Gingold, which would be cause enough for cheering. Blatant as ever, deafeningly loud, strutting like a parody of every tragedy queen, male or female, since time began, she was in splendid relishing form, her lips drawn back over fangs and her voice swooping campingly through a whole two octaves of sneer.

=== Last years ===
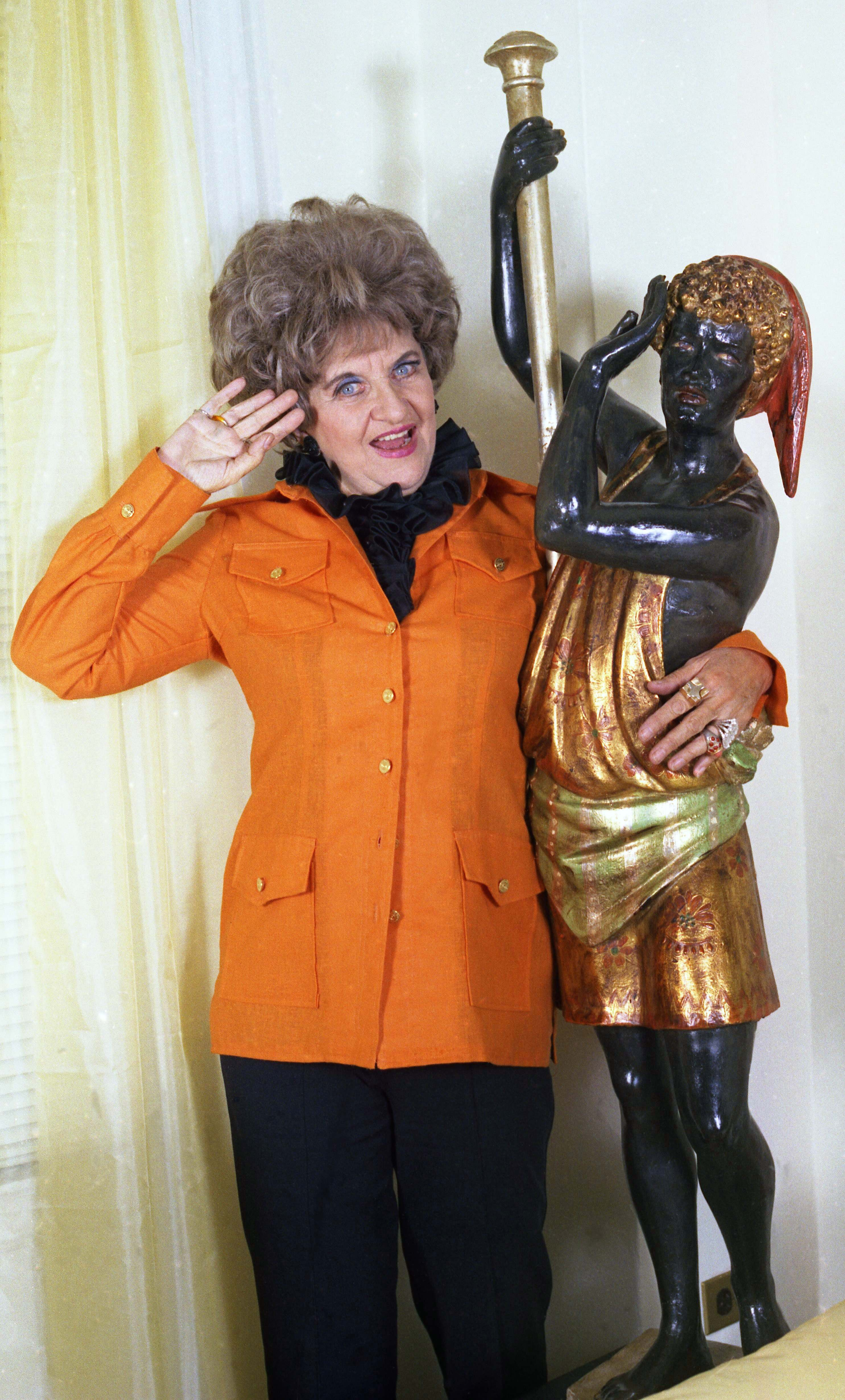
Gingold in 1973

In 1969, she co-starred in Winter of the Witch, a film made for the Learning Corporation of America, based on Wende and Harry Devlin's Old Black Witch! picturebook. The film is narrated by Burgess Meredith. Gingold played a gloomy, bad witch who becomes a good witch when a young boy and his mother move into her house. She cooks magic pancakes that make people happy, and the three of them turn their living room into a successful pancake parlor. The witch tells the boy that she became good because people are already scared nowadays, and that she will go on being good until everyone is happy and they need her to scare them again.

In 1972, she was among the guests in David Winters' musical television special The Special London Bridge Special, starring Tom Jones, and Jennifer O'Neill.

Gingold was a member of the original 1973 Broadway cast of Stephen Sondheim's A Little Night Music in the role of the elderly Mme. Armfeldt. Clive Barnes wrote "Hermione Gingold is immeasurably grande dame as the almost Proustian hostess (I haven't loved her so much since she sang about the Borgia orgies 30 years ago)." When the production transferred to London in 1975, Gingold reprised the role, and later played it in the film version of the musical (1977).

At the age of 77, Gingold made her operatic début, joining the San Francisco Opera to play the spoken role of the Duchess of Crackenthorp in Donizetti's La fille du régiment in 1975. In 1977, she took over the narrator's role in Side by Side by Sondheim on Broadway. After the New York run, the show toured the U.S. In Kansas City, Gingold suffered an accident that broke her knee and dislocated her arm; these injuries brought her performing career to an end. Still, she appeared in a 1980s Goya commercial for its drink Coca Goya Colada, shaking the two cans like maracas.

=== Death ===
Gingold died from heart problems and pneumonia at Lenox Hill Hospital in Manhattan on 24 May 1987, aged 89. She is interred at the Forest Lawn Memorial Park in Glendale, California.

== Legacy ==
Gingold's autobiography How to Grow Old Disgracefully was posthumously compiled in 1988. During her lifetime, Gingold published three books of memoir and anecdotes:

- The World Is Square (1946)
- My Own Unaided Work (1952)
- Sirens Should Be Seen and Not Heard (1963)

She wrote the play Abracadabra and contributed original material to the many revues in which she performed.

Gingold Theatrical Group in New York is named in her honor. Founded by David Staller in 2006, the company promotes the humanitarian ideals of activist playwright George Bernard Shaw.

== Screen performances ==
=== Film ===
- Dance Pretty Lady (1931)
- Public Nuisance No. 1 (1936)
- Someone at the Door (1936) – Lizzie Appleby
- Merry Comes to Town (1937) – Ida Witherspoon
- Meet Mr. Penny (1938) – Mrs. Wilson
- The Butler's Dilemma (1943) – Aunt Sophie
- The Pickwick Papers (1952) – Miss Tompkins
- Cosh Boy (1953) – Queenie
- Our Girl Friday (1953) – Spinster
- Around the World in 80 Days (1956) – Sporting Lady
- Gigi (1958) – Madame Alvarez
- Bell, Book and Candle (1958) – Bianca de Passe
- The Naked Edge (1961) – Lilly Harris
- The Music Man (1962) – Eulalie Mackechnie Shinn
- Gay Purr-ee (1962) – voice of Madame Rubens-Chatte
- The World of Henry Orient (1964, scenes deleted)
- I'd Rather Be Rich (1964) – Miss Grimshaw
- Harvey Middleman, Fireman (1965) – Mrs. Koogleman
- The Itch (1965) (short subject) – voice of Woman
- Promise Her Anything (1966) – Mrs. Luce
- Munster, Go Home! (1966) – Lady Effigie Munster
- Jules Verne's Rocket to the Moon (1967) – Angelica
- Winter of the Witch (short) (1969) – the Old Witch
- Tubby the Tuba (1975) – voice of Miss Squeek
- A Little Night Music (1977) – Madame Armfeldt
- Garbo Talks (1984) – Elizabeth Rennick

=== Television ===
- The Tonight Show with Jack Paar and later Johnny Carson (frequent guest from 1958 to 1962)
- The Merv Griffin Show with Merv Griffin (frequent guest)
- I've Got a Secret panelist (12 August 1959, 30 December 1959, 14 January 1963)
- What's My Line? Mystery Challenger (19 April 1959, 8 September 1963)
- Alfred Hitchcock Presents (1960) (Season 5 Episode 35: "The Schartz-Metterklume Method") – "Miss Hope" / Lady Charlotte
- Before the Fringe (1967) (2 episodes)
- It Takes a Thief (1968) ("Lay of the Land"; S01E15) – Duchess Christina
- Ironside ("Check Mate and Murder") (1970) – Ernestine Mugford
- Love, American Style (1971) – Jane (segment "Love and the Heist")
- Banyon (1971; pilot for series) – Peggy Revere
- Simple Gifts (1977) – Narrator (segment "The Great Frost"; voice)
- Amy & the Angel (1982) – Pincus
- Hotel ("Charades") (1983) – Felicity
- How to Be a Perfect Person in Just Three Days (1983) – Miss Sandwich

== Works ==
- Gingold, Hermione (1952). My own unaided work. Laurie. ASIN B0000CI8AI.
- Gingold, Hermione (1958). The World is Square. Athene. ASIN B000Q3R1P8.
- Gingold, Hermione (1962). Sirens should be seen and not heard. Lippincott.
- Gingold, Hermione (1989). How to Grow Old Disgracefully: An Autobiography. Gollancz. ISBN 0575044772.

== Sources ==
- Castle, Charles (1972). Noël. London: W H Allen. ISBN 0491005342.
- Freedland, Michael (1981). Maurice Chevalier. London: Barker. ISBN 0213167891.
- Gingold, Hermione (1945). The World is Square. London: Home and Van Thal. OCLC 8103593.
- Morley, Sheridan (1986). The Great Stage Stars. London: Angus & Robertson. ISBN 0816014019.
