= 50th Tony Awards =

1996 US theatrical awards ceremony

- Official poster for the 50th annual Tony Awards
- Date: June 2, 1996
- Location: Majestic Theatre, New York City, New York
- Hosted by: Nathan Lane
- Most wins: Bring in 'da Noise, Bring in 'da Funk, The King and I, and Rent (4)
- Most nominations: Rent (10)

Television/radio coverage
- Network: CBS

The 50th Annual Tony Awards was broadcast by CBS from the Majestic Theatre on June 2, 1996. Nathan Lane was the host.

== Eligibility ==
Shows that opened on Broadway during the 1995–1996 season before May 2, 1996 are eligible.

Original plays

- The Apple Doesn’t Fall...
- Buried Child
- Getting Away with Murder
- Jack: A Night on the Town with John Barrymore
- Master Class
- Moon Over Buffalo
- Racing Demon
- Sacrilege
- Seven Guitars

Original musicals

- Big
- Bring in 'da Noise, Bring in 'da Funk
- Chronicle of a Death Foretold
- Rent
- State Fair
- Swinging on a Star
- Victor/Victoria

Play revivals

- Bus Stop
- A Delicate Balance
- The Father
- Fool Moon
- Garden District
- Holiday
- An Ideal Husband
- Inherit the Wind
- A Midsummer Night's Dream
- The Night of the Iguana
- Paul Robeson
- The Play's the Thing
- The School for Scandal
- The Tempest

Musical revivals

- Company
- A Funny Thing Happened on the Way to the Forum
- Hello, Dolly!
- The King and I

== The ceremony ==
The opening number was "The Show Must Go On" performed by Liza Minnelli and Bernadette Peters, with Tony Award Alumni.

Presenters included: Bea Arthur, Edward Albee, Christine Baranski, Harry Belafonte, Matthew Broderick, Diahann Carroll, Hume Cronyn, Nanette Fabray, Robert Goulet, Gregory Hines, Uta Hagen, James Earl Jones, John Lithgow, Liza Minnelli, Patricia Neal, Sarah Jessica Parker, Bernadette Peters, John Rubinstein, Jane Seymour, Ron Silver, Lily Tomlin, Ben Vereen, Eli Wallach, Ray Walston, Lord Andrew Lloyd Webber.

Musicals represented:

- A Funny Thing Happened on the Way to the Forum ("Comedy Tonight" – Nathan Lane and Company);
- The King and I ("Shall We Dance?" – Lou Diamond Phillips, Donna Murphy, and children);
- Bring in 'da Noise, Bring in 'da Funk ("Taxi"/"Bring in 'da Noise, Bring in 'da Funk" – Savion Glover, Ann Duquesnay, Jeffrey Wright and Company);
- Big ("Fun" – Daniel Jenkins, Jon Cypher and Company);
- State Fair ("All I Owe I-Oh-Way" – John Davidson, Andrea McArdle, and Company);
- Rent ("Seasons of Love"/"La Vie Boheme" – Anthony Rapp, Taye Diggs, Adam Pascal, Idina Menzel and Company);
- Chronicle of a Death Foretold;
- Swinging on a Star ("Swinging on a Star" – Company)

== Award winners and nominees ==
Winners are in bold

| Best Play | Best Musical |
|---|---|
| **Master Class – Terrence McNally**; Buried Child – Sam Shepard; Racing Demon – David Hare; Seven Guitars – August Wilson | **Rent**; Bring in 'da Noise, Bring in 'da Funk; Chronicle of a Death Foretold; Swinging on a Star |
| Best Revival of a Play | Best Revival of a Musical |
| **A Delicate Balance**; A Midsummer Night's Dream; An Ideal Husband; Inherit the Wind | **The King and I**; A Funny Thing Happened on the Way to the Forum; Company; Hello, Dolly! |
| Best Performance by a Leading Actor in a Play | Best Performance by a Leading Actress in a Play |
| **George Grizzard – A Delicate Balance as Tobias**; Philip Bosco – Moon Over Buffalo as George Hay; George C. Scott – Inherit the Wind as Henry Drummond; Martin Shaw – An Ideal Husband as Lord Goring | **Zoe Caldwell – Master Class as Maria Callas**; Carol Burnett – Moon Over Buffalo as Charlotte Hay; Rosemary Harris – A Delicate Balance as Agnes; Elaine Stritch – A Delicate Balance as Claire |
| Best Performance by a Leading Actor in a Musical | Best Performance by a Leading Actress in a Musical |
| **Nathan Lane – A Funny Thing Happened on the Way to the Forum as Pseudolus**; Savion Glover – Bring in 'da Noise, Bring in 'da Funk as 'da Beat/Lil' Dahlin'; Adam Pascal – Rent as Roger Davis; Lou Diamond Phillips – The King and I as The King of Siam | **Donna Murphy – The King and I as Anna Leonowens**; Crista Moore – Big as Susan Lawrence; Daphne Rubin-Vega – Rent as Mimi Marquez; Julie Andrews – Victor/Victoria (declined nomination) as Victoria Grant |
| Best Performance by a Featured Actor in a Play | Best Performance by a Featured Actress in a Play |
| **Ruben Santiago-Hudson – Seven Guitars as Canewell**; James Gammon – Buried Child as Dodge; Roger Robinson – Seven Guitars as Hedley; Reg Rogers – Holiday as Ned Seton | **Audra McDonald – Master Class as Sharon Graham**; Viola Davis – Seven Guitars as Vera; Michele Shay – Seven Guitars as Louise; Lois Smith – Buried Child as Halie |
| Best Performance by a Featured Actor in a Musical | Best Performance by a Featured Actress in a Musical |
| **Wilson Jermaine Heredia – Rent as Angel Dumott Schunard**; Lewis J. Stadlen – A Funny Thing Happened on the Way to the Forum as Senex; Brett Tabisel – Big as Billy; Scott Wise – State Fair as Pat Gilbert | **Ann Duquesnay – Bring in 'da Noise, Bring in 'da Funk as 'da Singer/The Chanteuse**; Joohee Choi – The King and I as Tuptim; Veanne Cox – Company as Amy; Idina Menzel – Rent as Maureen Johnson |
| Best Book of a Musical | Best Original Score (Music and/or Lyrics) Written for the Theatre |
| **Jonathan Larson – Rent**; John Weidman – Big; Reg E. Gaines – Bring in 'da Noise, Bring in 'da Funk; Graciela Daniele, Jim Lewis and Michael John LaChiusa – Chronicle of a Death Foretold | **Rent – Jonathan Larson (music and lyrics)**; Big – David Shire (music) and Richard Maltby, Jr. (lyrics); Bring in 'da Noise, Bring in 'da Funk – Daryl Waters and Zane Mark (music), Ann Duquesnay (music & lyrics), George C. Wolfe and Reg E. Gaines (lyrics); State Fair – Richard Rodgers (music) and Oscar Hammerstein II (lyrics) |
| Best Scenic Design | Best Costume Design |
| **Brian Thomson – The King and I**; John Lee Beatty – A Delicate Balance; Scott Bradley – Seven Guitars; Anthony Ward – A Midsummer Night's Dream | **Roger Kirk – The King and I**; Jane Greenwood – A Delicate Balance; Allison Reeds – Buried Child; Paul Tazewell – Bring in 'da Noise, Bring in 'da Funk |
| Best Lighting Design | Best Choreography |
| **Jules Fisher and Peggy Eisenhauer – Bring in 'da Noise, Bring in 'da Funk**; Christopher Akerlind – Seven Guitars; Blake Burba – Rent; Nigel Levings – The King and I | **Savion Glover – Bring in 'da Noise, Bring in 'da Funk**; Graciela Daniele – Chronicle of a Death Foretold; Susan Stroman – Big; Marlies Yearby – Rent |
| Best Direction of a Play | Best Direction of a Musical |
| **Gerald Gutierrez – A Delicate Balance**; Peter Hall – An Ideal Husband; Lloyd Richards – Seven Guitars; Gary Sinise – Buried Child | **George C. Wolfe – Bring in 'da Noise, Bring in 'da Funk**; Michael Greif – Rent; Christopher Renshaw – The King and I; Jerry Zaks – A Funny Thing Happened on the Way to the Forum |

== Special awards ==
- Special Regional Theatre Award
  - Alley Theatre, Houston, Texas

=== Multiple nominations and awards ===
These productions had multiple nominations:

- 10 nominations: Rent
- 9 nominations: Bring in 'da Noise, Bring in 'da Funk
- 8 nominations: The King and I and Seven Guitars
- 7 nominations: A Delicate Balance
- 5 nominations: Big and Buried Child
- 4 nominations: A Funny Thing Happened on the Way to the Forum
- 3 nominations: An Ideal Husband, Chronicle of a Death Foretold, and Master Class
- 2 nominations: Company, Inherit the Wind, A Midsummer Night's Dream, Moon Over Buffalo and State Fair

The following productions received multiple awards.

- 4 wins: Bring in 'da Noise, Bring in 'da Funk, The King and I and Rent
- 3 wins: A Delicate Balance and Master Class

== See also ==
- Drama Desk Awards
- 1996 Laurence Olivier Awards – equivalent awards for West End theatre productions
- Obie Award
- New York Drama Critics' Circle
- Theatre World Award
- Lucille Lortel Awards
