= Drama Desk Award for Outstanding Featured Actor in a Musical =

Former American theatre award

Drama Desk Award for Outstanding Featured Actor
- Awarded for: Outstanding Featured Actor in a Musical
- Location: New York City
- Country: United States
- Presented by: Drama Desk
- First award: 1975
- Final award: 2022
- Website: dramadesk.org (defunct)

The Drama Desk Award for Outstanding Featured Actor in a Musical was an annual award presented by Drama Desk in recognition of achievements in theatre across collective Broadway, off-Broadway and off-off-Broadway productions in New York City. The award was one of eight new acting awards first presented in 1975, when Drama Desk retired an earlier award that had made no distinction between work in plays and musicals, nor between actors and actresses, nor between lead performers and featured performers.

After the 2022 ceremony, all eight acting categories introduced in 1975 were retired. The award for Outstanding Featured Actor in a Musical, along with Outstanding Featured Actress in a Musical, were replaced in 2023 with the gender neutral category of Outstanding Featured Performance in a Musical.

== Winners and nominees ==
Key

and bold indicates the winner.

=== 1970s ===
Year	Actor	Musical	Character
1975
1975	**Ted Ross**	**The Wiz**	**The Lion**
1975	Hinton Battle	The Wiz	The Scarecrow
1975	Pinta DeCola	In Gay Company	Unknown
1975	Jerry Lanning	Where's Charley?	Jack Chesney
1975	Gilbert Price	The Night That Made America Famous	Performer
1975	Richard Schull	Goodtime Charley	Minguet
1976
1976	**George Rose**	**My Fair Lady**	**Alfred P. Doolittle**
1976	Haruki Fujimoto	Pacific Overtures	Commodore Matthew Calbraith Perry
1976	James Harder	Very Good Eddie	Steward / Al Cleveland
1976	Barry Preston	Bubbling Brown Sugar	Charlie / Count
1977
1977	**Ken Bichel**	**I Love My Wife**	**Norman**
1977	**Michael Mark**	**I Love My Wife**	**Stanley**
1977	**John Miller**	**I Love My Wife**	**Harvey**
1977	**Joseph Saulter**	**I Love My Wife**	**Quenton**
1977	Daniel Benzali	Music Is	Feste
1977	Jack Cassidy	She Loves Me	Stephen Kodaly
1977	Christopher Hewett	Music Is	Malvolio
1977	Larry Marshall	Porgy and Bess	Sportin' Life
1978
1978	**Kevin Kline**	**On the Twentieth Century**	**Bruce Granit**
1978	Joel Higgins	Angel	Ben Gant
1978	Matt Landers	Working	Various Characters
1978	Brad Sullivan	Working	Mike LeFevre
1978	Charles Ward	Dancin'	Performer
1978	Lee Wilkof	The Present Tense	Performer
1979
1979	**Ken Jennings**	**Sweeney Todd**	**Tobias Ragg**
1979	Richard Cox	Platinum	Dan Danger
1979	Bob Gunton	King of Hearts	Raoul

=== 1980s ===
Year	Actor	Musical	Character
1980
1980	**Bob Gunton**	**Evita**	**Juan Perón**
1980	Joe Grifasi	The 1940's Radio Hour	Neal Tilden
1980	Harry Groener	Oklahoma!	Will Parker
1980	Jeff Keller	The 1940's Radio Hour	Johnny Cantone
1980	Don Novello	Gilda Radner – Live from New York	Himself
1980	Martin Vidnovic	Oklahoma!	Jud Fry
1981
1981	**Tony Azito**	**The Pirates of Penzance**	**The Sergeant of Police**
1981	Gregg Burge	Sophisticated Ladies	Performer
1981	Michael Davis	Broadway Follies	Performer
1981	Lee Roy Reams	42nd Street	Billy Lawlor
1981	Paxton Whitehead	Camelot	Pellinore
1982
1982	**Cleavant Derricks**	**Dreamgirls**	**James "Thunder" Early**
1982	Mark Hardwick	Pump Boys and Dinettes	L. M.
1982	Ben Harney	Dreamgirls	Curtis Taylor, Jr.
1983
1983	**Charles "Honi" Coles**	**My One and Only**	**Mr. Magix**
1983	Bruce Hubbard	Show Boat	Joe
1983	Franc Luz	Little Shop of Horrors	Orin Scrivello, D.D.S.
1983	Randle Mell	The Cradle Will Rock	Larry Foreman
1984
1984	**Martin Vidnovic**	**Baby**	**Nick Sakarian**
1984	Mace Barrett	Taking My Turn	Eric
1984	Hinton Battle	The Tap Dance Kid	Dipsey
1984	Charles Kimbrough	Sunday in the Park with George	Jules
1985
1985	**René Auberjonois**	**Big River**	**The Duke**
1985	John Goodman	Big River	Pap Finn
1985	Bob Gunton	Big River	The King
1985	Howard McGillin	La bohème	Marcel
1985	Timothy Nolen	Grind	Doyle
1985	John Short	Big River	Tom Sawyer
1986
1986	**Michael Rupert**	**Sweet Charity**	**Oscar Lindquist**
1986	Jason Alexander	Personals	Various Characters
1986	Gregg Burge	Song and Dance	Man
1986	Joe Grifasi	The Mystery of Edwin Drood	Bazzard / Mr. Philip Bax
1987
1987	**Michael Maguire**	**Les Misérables**	**Enjolras**
1987	Timothy Jerome	Me and My Girl	Herbert Parchester
1987	Michael O'Gorman	Smile	Tommy French
1987	Joaquin Romaguera	Gay Divorce	Teddy
1988
1988	**Robert Westenberg**	**Into the Woods**	**Cinderella's Prince / The Wolf**
1988	Harry Goz	Chess	Molokov
1988	Anthony Heald	Anything Goes	Evelyn Oakleigh
1988	Bill McCutcheon	Anything Goes	Moonface Martin
1988	Herbert L. Rawlings, Jr.	Dreamgirls	James "Thunder" Early
1989
1989	—N/a	—N/a	—N/a

=== 1990s ===
Year	Actor	Musical	Character
1990
1990	**Michael Jeter**	**Grand Hotel**	**Otto Kringelein**
1990	René Auberjonois	City of Angels	Irving S. Irving / Buddy Fidler
1990	Laurence Guittard	The Sound of Music	Various Characters
1990	Jonathan Hadary	Gypsy	Herbie
1991
1991	**Bruce Adler**	**Those Were the Days**	**Various Characters**
1991	John Cameron Mitchell	The Secret Garden	Dickon
1991	John Remme	A Funny Thing Happened on the Way to the Forum	Senex
1991	Lee Wilkof	Assassins	Samuel Byck
1992
1992	**Scott Waara**	**The Most Happy Fella**	**Herman**
1992	Bruce Adler	Crazy for You	Bela Zangler
1992	Walter Bobbie	Guys and Dolls	Nicely-Nicely Johnson
1992	Savion Glover	Jelly's Last Jam	Young Jelly
1993
1993	**Mark Michael Hutchinson**	**Blood Brothers**	**Eddie**
1993	Jerry Lanning	Anna Karenina	Prince Stephen Oblonsky
1993	Josh Mostel	My Favorite Year	Sy Benson
1994
1994	**Jarrod Emick**	**Damn Yankees**	**Joe Hardy**
1994	George de la Peña	The Red Shoes	Grisha Ljubov
1994	Sam Harris	Grease	Doody
1994	John Cameron Mitchell	Hello Again	The Young Thing
1994	Burke Moses	Beauty and the Beast	Gaston
1995
1995	—N/a	—N/a	—N/a
1996
1996	**Wilson Jermaine Heredia**	**Rent**	**Angel Dumott Schunard**
1996	Lewis Cleale	Swinging on a Star	Various Characters
1996	Michael McGrath	Swinging on a Star	Various Characters
1996	Brett Tabisel	Big: the musical	Billy Kopecki
1996	Scott Wise	State Fair	Pat Gilbert
1996	Ben Wright	State Fair	Wayne Frake
1997
1997	**Joel Grey**	**Chicago**	**Amos Hart**
1997	Stanley Bojarski	When Pigs Fly	Various Characters
1997	André De Shields	Play On!	Jester
1997	Sam Harris	The Life	Jojo
1997	Michael McElroy	Violet	Flick
1997	Jay Rogers	When Pigs Fly	Various Characters
1998
1998	**Gregg Edelman**	**1776**	**Edward Rutledge**
1998	Max Cassella	The Lion King	Timon
1998	Geoffrey Hoyle	The Lion King	Zazu
1998	John McMartin	High Society	Uncle Willie
1998	Renoly Santiago	The Capeman	Tony Hernandez
1998	Steven Sutcliffe	Ragtime	Mother's younger Brother
1999
1999	**Roger Bart**	**You're a Good Man, Charlie Brown**	**Snoopy**
1999	Bryan Batt	Forbidden Broadway Cleans Up Its Act	Various Characters
1999	Michel Bell	The Civil War	Clayton Toler
1999	Rufus Bonds Jr.	Parade	Jim Conley
1999	Ron Taylor	It Ain't Nothin' But the Blues	Various Characters
1999	Chip Zien	A New Brain	Mr. Bungee

=== 2000s ===
Year	Actor	Musical	Character
2000
2000	**Stephen Spinella**	**James Joyce's The Dead**	**Freddy Malins**
2000	Jason Antoon	Contact	Husband
2000	Christopher Fitzgerald	Saturday Night	Bobby
2000	Alistair Izobell	Kat and the Kings	Magoo
2000	Michael Mulheren	Kiss Me, Kate	Second Man
2000	Lee Wilkof	Kiss Me, Kate	First Man
2001
2001	**Gary Beach**	**The Producers**	**Roger de Bris**
2001	Roger Bart	The Producers	Carmen Ghia
2001	John Ellison Conlee	The Full Monty	Dave Bukatinsky
2001	André De Shields	The Full Monty	Noah "Horse" T. Simmons
2001	Mark Jacoby	Enter the Guardsman	The Playwright
2001	Jeff McCarthy	Urinetown	Officer Lockstock
2002
2002	**Shuler Hensley**	**Oklahoma!**	**Jud Fry**
2002	Justin Bohon	Oklahoma!	Will Parker
2002	Norbert Leo Butz	Thou Shalt Not	Camille Raquin
2002	Jerry Dixon	Tick, Tick... Boom!	Michael
2002	Gregg Edelman	Into the Woods	Cinderella's Prince / The Wolf
2002	Marc Kudisch	Thoroughly Modern Millie	Trevor Graydon III
2003
2003	**Dick Latessa**	**Hairspray**	**Wilbur Turnblad**
2003	John Dossett	Gypsy	Herbie
2003	Christopher Fitzgerald	Amour	Bertrand
2003	Charles Keating	A Man of No Importance	Carney / Oscar Wilde
2003	Steven Pasquale	A Man of No Importance	Robbie Fay
2003	Corey Reynolds	Hairspray	Seaweed J. Stubbs
2004
2004	**Raúl Esparza**	**Taboo**	**Phillip Sallon**
2004	Joel Blum	Golf: The Musical	Bob Hope
2004	Jeffrey Carlson	Taboo	Marilyn
2004	Mitchel David Federan	The Boy from Oz	Boy
2004	Marc Kudisch	Assassins	Proprietor
2004	Raymond Jaramillo McLeod	Wonderful Town	Wreck
2005
2005	**Denis O'Hare**	**Sweet Charity**	**Oscar Lindquist**
2005	Christian Borle	Spamalot	Various Characters
2005	Gregory Jbara	Dirty Rotten Scoundrels	Andre
2005	Norm Lewis	Dessa Rose	Nathan
2005	Tyler Maynard	Altar Boyz	Mark
2005	Michael McGrath	Spamalot	Mayor / Patsy
2006
2006	**Jim Dale**	**The Threepenny Opera**	**Mr. Peachum**
2006	Alexander Gemignani	Sweeney Todd	The Beadle
2006	Christian Hoff	Jersey Boys	Tommy DeVito
2006	Eddie Korbich	The Drowsy Chaperone	George
2006	John McMartin	Grey Gardens	J.V. "Major" Bouvier
2006	Daniel Reichard	Jersey Boys	Bob Gaudio
2007
2007	**Gavin Lee**	**Mary Poppins**	**Bert**
2007	Brooks Ashmanskas	Martin Short: Fame Becomes Me	Comedy All Star
2007	Christian Borle	Legally Blonde	Emmett Forrest
2007	Aaron Lazar	Les Misérables	Enjolras
2007	Orville Mendoza	Adrift in Macao	Tempura
2007	David Pittu	LoveMusik	Bertolt Brecht
2008
2008	**Boyd Gaines**	**Gypsy**	**Herbie**
2008	Danny Burstein	South Pacific	Luther Billis
2008	Christopher Fitzgerald	Young Frankenstein	Igor
2008	Shuler Hensley	Young Frankenstein	The Monster
2008	Bobby Steggert	The Slug Bearers of Kayrol Island	Immanuel Lebang
2008	Tom Wopat	A Catered Affair	Tom Hurley
2009
2009	**Gregory Jbara**	**Billy Elliot the Musical**	**Mr. Elliot**
2009	Hunter Foster	Happiness	Stanley
2009	Demond Green	The Toxic Avenger	Black Dude
2009	Marc Kudisch	9 to 5	Franklin Hart Jr.
2009	Bryce Ryness	Hair	Woof
2009	Christopher Sieber	Shrek the Musical	Lord Farquaad

=== 2010s ===
Year	Actor	Musical	Character
2010
2010	**Christopher Fitzgerald**	**Finian's Rainbow**	**Og**
2010	Kevin Chamberlin	The Addams Family	Uncle Fester
2010	Robin de Jesús	La Cage aux Folles	Jacob
2010	Jeffry Denman	Yank!	Artie
2010	Jeremy Morse	Bloodsong of Love	Lo Cocodrilo
2010	Bobby Steggert	Ragtime	Mother's Younger Brother
2011
2011	**John Larroquette**	**How to Succeed in Business Without Really Trying**	**J.B. Biggley**
2011	Adam Godley	Anything Goes	Lord Evelyn Oakleigh
2011	Brian Stokes Mitchell	Women on the Verge of a Nervous Breakdown	Ivan
2011	Rory O'Malley	The Book of Mormon	Elder McKinley
2011	Bob Stillman	Hello Again	The Husband
2011	Tom Wopat	Catch Me If You Can	Frank Abagnale Sr.
2012
2012	**Michael McGrath**	**Nice Work If You Can Get It**	**Cookie McGee**
2012	Phillip Boykin	Porgy and Bess	Crown
2012	Matt Cavenaugh	Death Takes a Holiday	Eric Fenton
2012	Michael Cerveris	Evita	Juan Perón
2012	Patrick Page	Spider-Man: Turn Off the Dark	Green Goblin
2012	Andrew Samonsky	Queen of the Mist	Frank Russell
2013
2013	**Bertie Carvel**	**Matilda the Musical**	**Miss Trunchbull**
2013	Stephen Bogardus	Passion	Colonel Ricci
2013	John Bolton	A Christmas Story: The Musical	The Old Man
2013	Keith Carradine	Hands on a Hardbody	JD Drew
2013	John Dossett	Giant	Bawley
2013	Andy Karl	The Mystery of Edwin Drood	Neville Landless
2014
2014	**James Monroe Iglehart**	**Aladdin**	**Genie**
2014	Danny Burstein	Cabaret	Herr Schultz
2014	Nick Cordero	Bullets Over Broadway: The Musical	Cheech
2014	Joshua Henry	Violet	Flick
2014	Rory O'Malley	Nobody Loves You	Evan
2014	Bobby Steggert	Big Fish	William Bloom
2015
2015	**Christian Borle**	**Something Rotten!**	**The Bard**
2015	Peter Friedman	Fly By Night	Mr. McClam
2015	Josh Grisetti	It Shoulda Been You	Marty Kaufman
2015	Andy Karl	On the Twentieth Century	Bruce Granit
2015	Leslie Odom, Jr.	Hamilton	Aaron Burr
2015	Brad Oscar	Something Rotten!	Nostradamus
2015	Max von Essen	An American in Paris	Henri Baurel
2016
2016	**Christopher Fitzgerald**	**Waitress**	**Ogie**
2016	Nicholas Barasch	She Loves Me	Arpad Laszlo
2016	Baylee Littrell	Disaster!	Ben / Lisa
2016	Paul Alexander Nolan	Bright Star	Jimmy Ray Dobbs
2016	A.J. Shively	Bright Star	Billy Cane
2017
2017	**Gavin Creel**	**Hello, Dolly!**	**Cornelius Hackl**
2017	Jeffry Denman	Kid Victory	Michael
2017	George Salazar	The Lightning Thief: The Percy Jackson Musical	Grover
2017	Ari'el Stachel	The Band's Visit	Haled
2017	Brandon Uranowitz	Falsettos	Mendel
2018
2018	**Gavin Lee**	**SpongeBob SquarePants**	**Squidward Tentacles**
2018	Damon Daunno	The Lucky Ones	Various
2018	Alexander Gemignani	Carousel	Enoch Snow
2018	Grey Henson	Mean Girls	Damian Hubbard
2018	Tony Yazbeck	Prince of Broadway	Various
2019
2019	**André De Shields**	**Hadestown**	**Hermes**
2019	Corbin Bleu	Kiss Me, Kate	Bill Calhoun/Lucentio
2019	Sydney James Harcourt	Girl from the North Country	Joe Scott
2019	George Salazar	Be More Chill	Michael Mell
2019	Patrick Vaill	Rodgers & Hammerstein's Oklahoma!	Jud Fry

=== 2020s ===
Year	Actor	Musical	Character
2020
2020	**Christian Borle**	**Little Shop of Horrors**	**Orin Scrivello**
2020	George Abud	Emojiland	Nerd Face
2020	Jay Armstrong Johnson	Scotland, PA	Banko
2020	Conrad Ricamora	Soft Power	Xue Xing
2020	Ryan Vasquez	The Wrong Man	The Man in Black
2021	No awards: New York theatres shuttered, March 2020 to September 2021, due to the COVID-19 pandemic in New York City		
2022
2022	**Matt Doyle**	**Company**	**Jamie**
2022	Justin Austin	Intimate Apparel	George Armstrong
2022	Justin Cooley	Kimberly Akimbo	Seth
2022	Jared Grimes	Funny Girl	Eddie Ryan
2022	Tavon Olds-Sample	MJ	Michael

== Multiple Wins ==
2 wins

- Christian Borle
- Gavin Lee
- Christopher Fitzgerald

== Multiple Nominations ==
5 nominations

- Christopher Fitzgerald

4 nominations

- Christian Borle

3 nominations

- Marc Kudisch
- André De Shields
- Michael McGrath
- Lee Wilkof
- Bobby Steggert

2 nominations

- Hinton Battle
- Danny Burstein
- Gavin Lee
- Roger Bart
- John Dossett
- John McMartin
- Shuler Hensley
- Alexander Gemignani
- George Salazar
- Andy Karl
- Gregory Jbara

== See also ==
- Laurence Olivier Award for Best Performance in a Supporting Role in a Musical
- Laurence Olivier Award for Best Actor in a Supporting Role in a Musical
- Tony Award for Best Featured Actor in a Musical
