= Bichel =

Bichel is a surname. Notable people with the surname include:

- Andy Bichel (born 1970), Australian cricketer
- Don Bichel (1935–2004), Australian cricketer
- Ken Bichel (born 1945), American actor, composer, conductor, pianist, and synthesizer musician
