= Twilight 22 =

American electro band

- Origin: San Francisco Bay Area, California, U.S.
- Genres: Electro; electrofunk
- Years active: 1980s–1990s
- Label: Vanguard
- Members: Gordon Bahary; Joseph Saulter

Twilight 22 was an American electro band led by Gordon Bahary, but also featuring lead singer and co-songwriter Joseph Saulter.

== "Electric Kingdom" & follow-up ==
The duo released only one charting single, "Electric Kingdom", released on their 1984 debut album Twilight 22 by Vanguard Records. The song peaked at #7 on US R&B Charts. A follow-up single, "Siberian Nights," released later in 1984, failed to chart.

=== Chart performance ===
Chart (1983–84)	Peak position
US Billboard Hot 100	79
US "Billboard" Dance/Disco Top 80	5
US Hot Black Singles (Billboard)	7

== Discography ==
=== Albums ===
- Twilight 22 (Vanguard, 1984)
