= Bayfest (Mobile) =

Music festival in Mobile, Alabama

BayFest
- Genre: Music
- Dates: early October
- Locations: Mobile, Alabama, U.S.A.
- Years active: 1995–2015
- Website: http://www.bayfest.com/

BayFest was an annual three-day music festival held in the heart of downtown Mobile, Alabama. Founded in 1995, the festival offered a variety of music including pop, jazz, classic rock, alternative, R&B, rap, gospel, and modern rock. It was based at Bienville Square. The Launching Pad stage during Bayfest focused on local and regional talent. The event encouraged "going green" by providing for recycling throughout the grounds.

After perceived poor lineups, fewer acts and increasing ticket prices caused some years of diminishing interest, organizers for Bayfest announced its ending two weeks before its planned 2015 festival.

== History ==
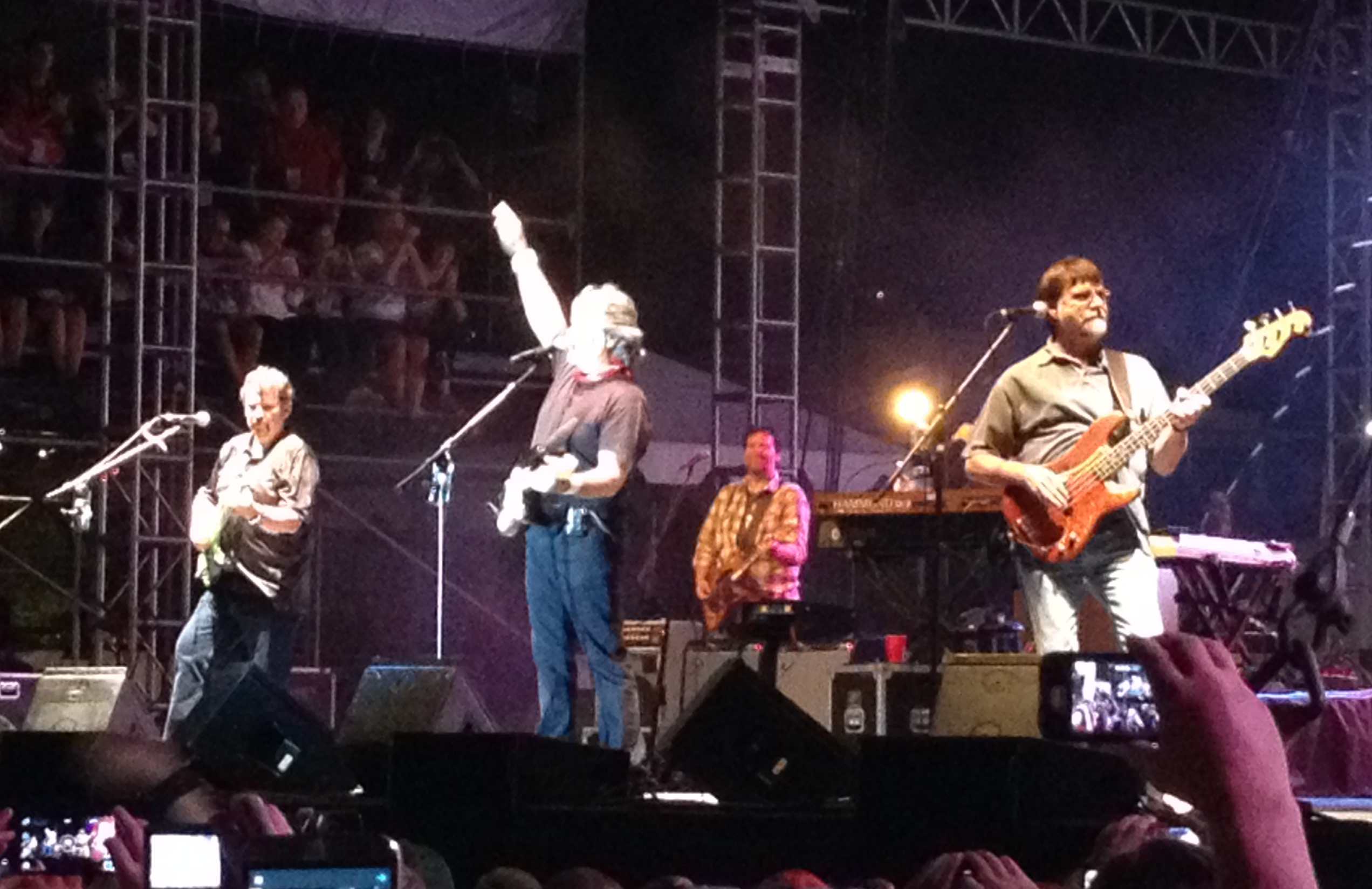
Alabama at Bayfest in 2014.

Growing from an initial attendance of 50,000 people in 1995, BayFest became known for its array of musical talent suited to a wide variety of tastes. In 2003, the festival included over 125 live musical acts on nine stages and had an average attendance of more than 200,000 people during the three-day weekend each year. Throughout the past fifteen years, acts such as 3 Doors Down, Alice in Chains, B.B. King, The Beach Boys, Big & Rich, Collective Soul, Hootie & the Blowfish, Keith Urban, LeAnn Rimes, Ludacris, The Temptations, Travis Tritt, Stone Temple Pilots, Uncle Kracker, and Velvet Revolver have performed at BayFest.

The 2008 lineup included Better Than Ezra, Bow Wow, Buckcherry, Eric Church, Kid Rock, Nelly, Puddle of Mudd, Sister Hazel, Three Days Grace, and Wynonna Judd. During its first eleven years, BayFest was voted six times as Mobile's "Best Annual Event" in Mobile Bay Monthly magazine, surpassing the city's celebration of Mardi Gras. It was named as one of the Southeast Tourism Society's "Top 20 Events" several times beginning in 1995.

In its later years, as happened with similar festivals elsewhere in the U.S., the event suffered from declining interest. Tropical Storm Karen adversely affected the festival in 2013. Financial concerns briefly led organizers to reschedule the 2015 event to the Grounds in West Mobile, before deciding to remain in downtown Mobile despite their difficulties. On September 16, 2015, organizers announced the event's ending, as well as the cancellation of its planned 21st festival.

== Organization ==
The festival was organized each year by BayFest, Inc., a non-profit organization consisting of more than 1000 non-paid volunteers. All ticket sales were invested directly back into the festival for upcoming events.

== Lineups ==
=== 2013 Lineup ===
Bayfest 2013 took place on October 4–6, 2013.

=== 2012 Lineup ===
Bayfest 2012 took place from October 5–7, 2012 and the lineup included: Journey, Luke Bryan, Bush, Pretty Lights, Big & Rich, Buckcherry, My Darkest Days, Pat Benatar, Loverboy, Ledisi, Al Green, Grace Potter and the Nocturnals, Chris Cagle, Eric Benét, Ruben Studdard, Willie Nelson, Michael Franti & Spearhead, Rose Royce, Charlie Wilson, Brandon Green, Tank, Mimosa, The Campaign 1984, and Dennis Nelson.

=== 2011 Lineup ===
Bayfest 2011 took place from October 7–9, 2011 and the lineup included: Korn, Blake Shelton, 3 Doors Down, Duran Duran, Hinder, Eric Church, Toby Keith, Ludacris, Drowning Pool, Anthony Hamilton, Theory of a Deadman, Shaggy, Wiz Khalifa, NEEDTOBREATHE, The Campaign 1984, and Dennis Nelson.

=== 2010 Lineup ===
Bayfest 2010 took place from October 1–3, 2010 and the lineup included: Godsmack, Shinedown, Mötley Crüe, Nelly, Five Finger Death Punch, Saving Abel, Lady Antebellum, Adelitas Way, Papa Roach, Sick Puppies, Skillet, Fuel, Tonic, Rehab, Earth, Wind & Fire, and Grayson Capps, Evans Blue

=== 2009 Lineup ===
Bayfest 2009 took place from October 2–4, 2009 and the lineup included: Stone Temple Pilots, 3 Doors Down, Steve Miller Band, Train, Ludacris, Chevelle, Cage the Elephant, Cavo, Halestorm, Pop Evil, and Meat Puppets.

=== 2008 Lineup ===
Bayfest 2008 took place from October 3–5, 2008 and the lineup included: Darius Rucker, Kid Rock, Three Days Grace, Candlebox, Eric Church, Nelly, Blake Shelton, Better Than Ezra, David Nail, Sister Hazel, Saving Abel, Puddle of Mudd, P.O.D., and Bow Wow. Akon, T-Pain, Jessie J, and BuckCherry.

=== 2007 Lineup ===
Bayfest 2007 took place from October 5–7, 2007 and the lineup included: Velvet Revolver, Alice in Chains, Blue Öyster Cult, Big & Rich, LeAnn Rimes, Ludacris, Daughtry, Hellyeah, Flyleaf, John Miller, Luke Bryan, Willie Clayton, Joan Jett and the Blackhearts, Sparta, Operator, The S.O.S. Band, Chaka Khan, Brick, Barry Richman, and Dennis Nelson.

=== 2006 Lineup ===
Bayfest 2006 took place from October 6–8, 2006 and the lineup included: Lynyrd Skynyrd, Gretchen Wilson, MC Hammer, Keith Anderson, Shinedown, Evans Blue, 10 Years, Al Green, Michael Bolton, Gary Allan, Trick Pony, Hinder, Blaine Larsen, and The Wreckers, Little Big Town. Andre and the Night Hounds.

=== 2005 Lineup ===
Bayfest 2005 took place from October 7–9, 2005 and the lineup included: Widespread Panic, Grand Funk Railroad, Jason Aldean, The Grass Roots, Hot Apple Pie, Craig Morgan, Dark New Day, Elvin Bishop, The Lowdown, Kool & the Gang, and Adam Holt & The Blues Congregation.

=== 2004 Lineup ===
Bayfest 2004 took place from October 1–3, 2004 and the lineup included: The Beach Boys, The Charlie Daniels Band, Travis Tritt, Collective Soul, Three Days Grace, Breaking Benjamin, Seether, Uncle Kracker, Ruben Studdard, George Clinton & Parliament Funkadelic, Josh Turner, John Miller, Brad Cotter, Regina Belle, Buddy Jewell, The Commodores, Will Downing, Andy Smith, Dr. Hook, Edwin McCain, Emerson Drive, The Movement, Debbie 'The Delta Diva' Bivens and Dennis Nelson.

=== 2003 Lineup ===
Bayfest 2003 took place from October 3–5, 2003 and the lineup included: Village People, Keith Urban, John Miller, Sugar Ray, Ludacris, Blue October, Trace Adkins, Andy Griggs, The Gap Band, Default, Billy Currington, The Manhattans, and Bobby "Blue" Bland.

=== 2002 Lineup ===
Bayfest 2002 took place from October 4–6, 2002 and the lineup included Jessica Andres, SHeDAISY, Dokken, Rascal Flats, Billy Ray Cyrus, Baha Men, Lynyrd Skynyrd, and Stone Temple Pilots.

=== 2001 Lineup ===
Bayfest 2001 took place from October 5–7, 2001 and the lineup included 3 Doors Down, Lucinda Williams, Lee Ann Womack, Kenny Chesney, Cowboy Mouth, and Live.

=== 2000 Lineup ===
Bayfest 2000 took place from October 6–8, 2000 and the lineup included Gladys Knight, Travis Tritt, Dr. John, Blues Traveler, Mighty Mighty Bosstones, Blessid Union of Souls, Coyboy Junkies, Nine Days

=== 1999 Lineup ===
Bayfest 1998 took place from October 1–9, 1999 and the lineup included B.B. King, Jerry Lee Lewis, Hank Williams Jr., John Michael Montgomery, Stone Temple Pilots, Kenny Wayne Shepherd, Cheap Trick, and Dottie Peoples

=== 1998 Lineup ===
Bayfest 1998 took place from October 2–4, 1998 and the lineup included Lou Rawls, Merle Haggard, Creed, Candelbox, the Charlie Daniels Band, Beth Nielsen Chapman, John Kay and Steppenwolf, 38 Special, the Four Tops, and Sister Hazel

=== 1997 Lineup ===
Bayfest 1997 took place from October 3–5, 1997 and the lineup included Trisha Yearwood, John Anderson, Morris Day and the Time, the Fabulous Thunderbirds, BR5-49, and Seven Mary Three Wilson Pickett, Molly Hatchet,

=== 1996 Lineup ===
Bayfest 1996 took place from October 4–6, 1996 and the lineup included Buddy Guy, Drivin' N' Cryin', the Neville Brothers, Kansas, Patty Loveless, War, and Widespread Panic.

=== 1995 Lineup ===
Bayfest 1995 took place from October 6–8, 1995 and the lineup included The Temptations, Little Richard, The Village People, Three Dog Night, Commodores, Clay Walker, Bela Fleck, Cake, Dead Eye Dick
