= Malatesta's Carnival of Blood =

American horror film

- Theatrical release poster
- Directed by: Christopher Speeth
- Story by: Werner Liepolt
- Produced by: Richard Grosser; Walker Stuart
- Starring: Janine Carazo; Jerome Dempsey; Daniel Dietrich; Lenny Baker; Hervé Villechaize; William Preston
- Cinematography: Norman Gaines
- Distributed by: Windmill Films
- Release date: May 6, 1973
- Running time: 74 minutes
- Country: United States
- Language: English

Malatesta's Carnival of Blood is a 1973 American horror film directed by Christopher Speeth and written by Werner Liepolt. It is the only film that Speeth and Liepolt made.

== Plot ==
Frank Norris, his wife, and daughter, Vena, arrive at a dilapidated carnival, where they are hired as employees. They are shown around the amusement park by Mr. Blood, a manager who is unaware that the Norrises are actually covertly attempting to locate their missing son, Johnny, who worked at the carnival. The Norrises stay at the carnival in their RV. That night, one of the carnival's employees is decapitated while riding the shut-down rollercoaster in the park. Another employee who witnessed the decapitation is subsequently attacked by the carnival's janitor, Sticker, who impales him through the head. Several employees of the carnival—all of whom have a pallid grey skin color—bring the man's body into an underground chamber beneath the park, and feast on his body.

Meanwhile, Vena ventures into the park at night to meet with Kit, a young, handsome employee who operates the tunnel of love ride, and to whom Vena has taken a liking. En route, she is approached by Sonja, a cross-dressing male fortune teller, who attempts to offer her a reading, but she declines. Kit confides in Vena that an entire family disappeared from the carnival, and that he is suspicious of its proprietors, who may be part of an underground cannibalistic cult. During the conversation, Sticker attacks them, and the two flee in separate directions. Vena comes across Bobo, a dwarf, who warns her of impending danger.

Vena continues to wander through the park, stumbling through prop rooms, bizarre rides, and a movie theater where the various pallid, zombie-like employees watch a silent film with Malatesta, their silk-caped leader. On the ferris wheel, Vena sees Kit's corpse in one of the cars, which causes her to have a nervous breakdown. Meanwhile, Frank realizes that Vena has snuck out of the RV, and attempts to leave to search for her, but the two are cornered in the RV by the pallid cultists. Vena attempts to call police from a phone booth, but is subsequently chased by Sticker into a funhouse. Frank and his wife eventually flee the RV, and are pursued by a gang of the cultists through the park.

The following morning, Johnny—who has been deliberately kept from his family, unaware they were searching for him—notices his parents' RV on the grounds. Mr. Blood vaguely tells him his family is "at rest." Alarmed, Johnny goes searching for Vena. Mr. Blood apparently decides to help save Vena, who is being kept in the caverns beneath the carnival by Malatesta and his cannibal followers, whom Mr. Blood explains to Vena are his family. Instead of helping Vena, however, Mr. Blood lures her to a chamber where he begins to drain her of her blood.

Mr. Blood begins to drink Vena's blood, but is confronted by Malatesta, who stumbles upon the scene. Mr. Blood subsequently dies after Malatesta bares his face to him. Meanwhile, Johnny finds Vena and saves her, while Frank and his wife, lost in the caverns beneath the carnival, stumble upon the cult's movie theater. Mrs. Norris is stabbed to death by Bobo and subsequently eaten, while the others chase after Frank, who is eventually impaled through the eye after becoming lost in a hall of mirrors. Sonja locates Vena and claims he will lead her to her parents—instead, he brings her to a freezer where their corpses are hung from the ceiling, and locks her inside.

Some time later, a police officer visits the carnival and questions Malatesta about the Norrises' disappearances. However, the officer seems oblivious. Bobo offers to let the officer have his hand at the dunk tank. He throws the ball, unknowingly dropping a bound-and-gagged Johnny into a water tank to drown. Vena remains locked in the caverns with her parents' corpses, while Malatesta continues to operate the carnival above.

== Cast ==
- Janine Carazo as Vena Norris
- Jerome Dempsey as Blood
- Daniel Dietrich as Malatesta
- Lenny Baker as Sonja
- Paul Hostetler as Frank Norris
- Betsy Henn as Mrs. Norris
- Chris Thomas as Kit
- Hervé Villechaize as Bobo
- William Preston as Sticker
- James Lambert as Winston

== Release ==
=== Home media ===
The film was released for the first time on DVD and Blu-ray by Arrow Video on December 12, 2017.

== Reception ==
Jon Condit from Dread Central gave the film a score of 3.5 out of 5, writing, "While Malatesta's is certainly not a terrible film, it is definitely not one that I would recommend to the general horror viewing public. I would save this recommendation for those who can appreciate the cult classics, and who have a taste for the unusual or downright bizarre." TV Guide awarded the film 1/5 stars, calling it "a fairly typical, offbeat number". Chris Coffel from Bloody Disgusting rated the film a score of 3/5, writing, "In a way it's sort of like Manos: The Hands of Fate but quite a bit more fun and enjoyable." Brett Gallman from Oh, the Horror! wrote, "Malatesta's Carnival of Blood approaches the intersection of refined gothic horror, scummy drive-in exploitation, and Eurotrash fever dreams; rather than do so cautiously, it plunges headlong, creating a messy but compelling collision, leaving viewers to sift through the malformed wreckage." Bill Gibron from DVD Talk gave the film 3/5 stars, noting that although it wasn't a classic, he stated that the film "does contain a decisive doorway into Christopher Eric Speeth's addteurism".
