= Henry Judd Baker =

American actor

- Born: United States
- Died: August 28, 2016
- Occupation: Actor

Henry Judd Baker (died August 28, 2016) was an American actor known for such films and television shows as Oliver Stone's Seizure, Clean and Sober, The Mighty Quinn, William Friedkin's Cruising and Dark Shadows.

== Filmography ==
Year	Title	Role	Notes
1974	Seizure	Jackal	
1977	Short Eyes	Other Inmate	
1978	Fingers	Leonard	
1980	Cruising	Tough Cop	
1981	Neighbors	Police Officer #2	
1982	Vigilante	Quinn	
1985	After Hours	Jett	
1986	The Money Pit	Oscar	
1986	America	Mugger	
1988	Shakedown	Big Leroy	
1988	Clean and Sober	Xavier	
1989	The Mighty Quinn	Nicotine	
1991	The Super	Man on Stoop #1	(Final film role)
