= Seizure (film) =

1974 film by Oliver Stone

- Theatrical release poster
- Directed by: Oliver Stone
- Written by: Oliver Stone; Edward Mann
- Produced by: Garrard Glenn
- Starring: Jonathan Frid; Martine Beswick; Hervé Villechaize; Henry Judd Baker
- Cinematography: Roger Racine
- Edited by: Nobuko Oganesoff; Oliver Stone
- Music by: Lee Gagnon
- Production companies: Astral Bellevue Pathé; Cine Films Inc.; Cinerama Productions Corp.; Euro-American Pictures; Intercontinental Leisure Industries Ltd.; Queen of Evil Ltd.
- Distributed by: Cinerama Releasing Corporation; American International Pictures
- Release date: November 6, 1974
- Running time: 98 minutes
- Countries: Canada; United States
- Language: English
- Budget: CAD $250,000

Seizure is a 1974 horror film. It is the feature film directorial debut of Oliver Stone, who also co-wrote the screenplay.

== Plot ==
Horror writer Edmund Blackstone sees his recurring nightmare come to chilling life one weekend as one by one, his friends and family are killed by three villains: the Queen of Evil, a dwarf named Spider, and a giant scar-faced strongman called Jackal.

== Cast ==
- Jonathan Frid as Edmund Blackstone
- Martine Beswick as Queen of Evil
- Joseph Sirola as Charlie
- Hervé Villechaize as Spider
- Anne Meacham as Eunice Kahn
- Roger De Koven as Serge Kahn
- Christina Pickles as Nicole Blackstone
- Troy Donahue as Mark Frost
- Mary Woronov as Mikki Hughes
- Richard Cox as Gerald
- Henry Judd Baker as Jackal
- Alexis Kirk as Arris

== Production ==
Seizure is the directorial debut of Oliver Stone, who also co-wrote the screenplay. Star Mary Woronov would later claim that gangster Michael Thevis was one of the film's producers. He apparently partially bankrolled the film in an attempt to launder money, as he was under investigation by the FBI.

== Release ==
The film had a limited release theatrically in the United States by Cinerama Releasing Corporation, playing on New York's 42nd street in 1974.

The film was released on VHS by various video companies in the 1980s including Prism Entertainment. A transfer to DVD and Blu-ray was released on September 9, 2014, by Scorpion Releasing.

== See also ==
- List of American films of 1974
