= Dirty Deeds (2005 film) =

2005 film by David Kendall

- Theatrical release poster
- Directed by: David Kendall
- Written by: Jon Land; Jonathan Thies
- Produced by: Bill Civitella; Todd Zeile
- Starring: Milo Ventimiglia; Lacey Chabert; Tom Amandes; Matthew Carey; Mark Derwin; Charles Durning
- Cinematography: Mark Doering-Powell
- Edited by: Wendy Smith
- Music by: Brandon Danziger; Zach Danziger; Didier Rachou
- Distributed by: Freestyle Releasing
- Release date: August 25, 2005
- Running time: 87 minutes
- Country: United States
- Language: English
- Box office: US$146,490

Dirty Deeds is a 2005 American comedy film directed by David Kendall, produced by Bill Civitella and Dan Kaplow, and written by Jon Land and Jonathan Thies. It was released on August 25, 2005, in the United States and filmed in Los Angeles, California.

== Plot ==
High-school student Zach Harper sets out to complete the "Dirty Deeds", an outrageous list of ten challenges that must be completed between dusk and dawn on the Friday night of his high school's homecoming weekend. The only student to complete the entire list, Duncan Rime, did so in 1989 when only 8 tasks comprised the list. Rime later reveals that whenever someone completes the entire list, more are added to it.

Zach attempts to complete the deeds for a classmate, the beautiful Meg Cummings. Meg's younger brother, Kyle, wants to do the challenge to earn the respect of the school's jocks, who are constantly bullying him. Meg is concerned for her brother, and she insists that Zach stop him from trying to do something so foolish. While Meg had no intention of Zach attempting the deeds in place of her brother, Zach decides to take on the challenge.

The night begins, and Zach easily checks off the first item on the list—drink beer in front of the cops—by pouring a beer into a coffee cup and consuming it in front of them. This way, the cops, who are determined to stop all those who attempt the deeds, have no idea of Zach's intentions of completing the list. As Zach attempts the nine remaining deeds, the jocks do everything in their power to prevent him from completing it. Throughout his crazy night, Zach enlists the help of those around him to accomplish the difficult tasks. Along the way, Zach meets Duncan Rime who tries to warn him about how hollow the victory can be. Afterwards, Zach refuses to continue, but Dan and JD (the tough kid from Deed #2) decide to try to ruin the carnival so that Zach will be blamed. With some last-minute help from Vincent Scarno (the owner of the car from Deed #8), Zach is able to turn the tables in time. In the midst of everything, Zach and Meg end up falling in love over the list of "Dirty Deeds".

== Cast ==
- Milo Ventimiglia as Zach Harper
- Lacey Chabert as Meg Cummings
- Tom Amandes as Vice Principal Lester Fuchs
- Matthew Carey as Dan Lawton
- Wes Robinson as Kyle Cummings
- Mark Derwin as Vincent Scarno
- Charles Durning as Victor Rasdale
- Michael Milhoan as Officer Dill
- Keith Britton as Officer Bevins
- Billy L. Sullivan as Stash
- Zoe Saldana as Rachel Buff
- Arielle Kebbel as Alison
- Ray Santiago as Bobby D
- Erin Torpey as Jen, Dan's girlfriend
- Alex Solowitz as JD Riplock
- Danso Gordon as Biggs
- Todd Zeile as Mullet / Duncan Rime
- Fred Meyers as Lockett
- Charles Noland as Blind Man
- Patrick Tatten as Student
- Brett Tabisel as Stick

== Reception ==
On the review aggregator website Rotten Tomatoes, 7% of 14 critics' reviews are positive. Metacritic, which uses a weighted average, assigned the film a score of 28 out of 100, based on 6 critics, indicating "generally unfavorable" reviews.

Writing for Entertainment Weekly, Scott Brown rated it "D+" and described the film as "too mild to be dirty, yet too dirty to be charming, and altogether too generic to be much of anything."

== Music ==
The following were some of the songs featured in the film.

- Bowling for Soup – “Almost”
- Uptown Sinclair – “Face Down”
- Valley Lodge – “If It Takes All Night”
- The SmashUp – “Icarus Flies”
- Alex Solowitz – “Take it and Shove it”
- Bryan Datillo – “ICGM (Italian Click Gang Mafiosa)”
- Grace & Manners – “9 By 9”
