= Next Stop, Greenwich Village =

1976 film by Paul Mazursky

- Directed by: Paul Mazursky
- Written by: Paul Mazursky
- Produced by: Paul Mazursky; Anthony Ray
- Starring: Lenny Baker; Shelley Winters; Ellen Greene; Lois Smith; Christopher Walken
- Cinematography: Arthur J. Ornitz
- Edited by: Richard Halsey
- Music by: Bill Conti; Dave Brubeck Quartet
- Distributed by: 20th Century Fox
- Release date: February 4, 1976
- Running time: 111 minutes
- Country: United States
- Language: English
- Box office: $1,060,000 (domestic)

Next Stop, Greenwich Village is a 1976 American comedy-drama film written and directed by Paul Mazursky, featuring Lenny Baker, Shelley Winters, Ellen Greene, Lois Smith, and Christopher Walken.

== Plot ==
The film takes place in 1953. Larry Lipinsky is a 22-year old Jewish man from Brownsville in Brooklyn, New York, with dreams of stardom. He moves to Greenwich Village, much to the chagrin of his overprotective mother. Larry ends up hanging out with an eccentric bunch of characters while waiting for his big break. He has a group of tight-knit friends, which includes a wacky girl named Connie; Anita, an emotionally distraught woman who constantly contemplates suicide; Robert, a young WASP who fancies himself a poet; and Bernstein, an African-American gay man. All the while, he tries to maintain a stormy relationship with Sarah, his girlfriend. This band of outsiders becomes Larry's new family as he struggles as an actor and works toward a break in Hollywood.

== Cast ==
- Lenny Baker as Larry Lapinsky
- Shelley Winters as Fay Lapinsky
- Ellen Greene as Sarah
- Lois Smith as Anita
- Christopher Walken as Robert (credited as Chris Walken)
- Antonio Fargas as Bernstein
- Mike Kellin as Ben Lapinsky
- Lou Jacobi as Herb
- Dori Brenner as Connie
- Jeff Goldblum as Clyde Baxter
- Joe Spinell as Cop At El Station
- Rochelle Oliver as Dr. Marsha
- Rashel Novikoff as Mrs. Tupperman
- Michael Egan as Herbert Berghof, Acting Coach
- Bill Murray (uncredited) as Nick Kessler
- Stuart Pankin (uncredited) as Man At Party
- Vincent Schiavelli (uncredited) as Man At Rent Party

== Production ==
Filmmaker Mazursky had made his acting debut in Stanley Kubrick's 1953 film Fear and Desire, and Next Stop, Greenwich Village is a semi-autobiographical account of Mazursky's early life as an actor.

The film was entered into the 1976 Cannes Film Festival.

Mazursky discusses the making of this film in an interview with Nicholas Pasquariello published in Filmmakers Newsletter.

=== Casting ===
This film is notable for being Bill Murray's first film, with Murray having a few minutes of screen time. Jeff Goldblum and Christopher Walken were early in their careers.

== Reception ==
The film generally was well received by critics. Pauline Kael was particularly smitten with the film, calling it "Mazursky's own Amarcord. And I like it better than Fellini's." Kael goes on to say that it's a "satire without bitterness and without extravagance" and that the film is a "comedy of wisdom."

Rotten Tomatoes gave the film a "fresh" score of 86% based on 22 reviews.
