= Michael McGrath (actor) =

American stage actor (1957–2023)

- Born: September 25, 1957; Worcester, Massachusetts, U.S.
- Died: September 14, 2023 (aged 65); Bloomfield, New Jersey, U.S.
- Occupation: Actor
- Years active: 1990–2023
- Spouse: Toni DiBuono (m. 1993)
- Children: 1
- Awards: Tony Award for Best Featured Actor in a Musical (2012)

Michael McGrath (September 25, 1957 – September 14, 2023) was an American actor. Best known for his work on the Broadway stage, he received a Tony Award in 2012 for his performance in the musical Nice Work If You Can Get It.

== Career ==
McGrath was an ensemble member and understudy for many shows, including My Favorite Year, Swinging on a Star, and Little Me. He appeared in the musicals Anything Goes (2002) as Moonface Martin and in Wonderful Town (2003) as Chick Clark. McGrath played the role of Patsy in the Broadway musical Spamalot (2005), for which he received a nomination for a Tony Award for Best Featured Actor in a Musical.

McGrath starred in the play Is He Dead? on Broadway in December 2007 to February 2008 as Agamemnon Buckner. McGrath originated the role of Mr. Simmons in Memphis (Broadway, 2009).

McGrath played the role of Cookie McGee in the Broadway musical Nice Work If You Can Get It (2012), for which he won the Tony Award for Best Featured Actor in a Musical. He also won the Drama Desk Award for Outstanding Featured Actor in a Musical for this performance.

In 2014, he was in the A.R.T. pre-Broadway production of Finding Neverland replacing Roger Bart in the dual role of Charles Frohman and Captain James Hook.

McGrath appeared in a new musical The Honeymooners, based on the television comedy The Honeymooners. The musical premiered at the Paper Mill Playhouse in Milburn, New Jersey on September 28, 2017, and starred McGrath as Ralph Kramden, Michael Mastro as Ed Norton, Leslie Kritzer as Alice Kramden, and Laura Bell Bundy as Trixie Norton. McGrath appeared in a workshop of the musical in 2014.

On television, McGrath was the announcer/sidekick on The Martin Short Show.

While working in the Boston production of Forbidden Broadway, McGrath met his future wife, Toni DiBuono.

== Personal life and death ==
McGrath hailed from Worcester, Massachusetts. He was married to actress Toni DiBuono.

Michael McGrath died at his home in Bloomfield, New Jersey, on September 14, 2023, at the age of 65, 11 days shy of his 66th birthday.

== Filmography ==
=== Film ===
Year	Title	Role	Notes
1996	Boyfriends	James	
2002	Changing Lanes	Seavers	
2003	Cowboys & Angels	Mud Club Student	
2005	The Interpreter	Jonathan Ferris	
2006	Ira & Abby	Tony the Doorman	
2011	Escape of the Gingerbread Man	Stan	Voice; short film

=== Television ===
Year	Title	Role	Notes
1990	Mathnet	Barney Oldmeal	Episode: "The Case of the Meter Massacre"
1999–2000	The Martin Short Show	Himself (announcer)	Unknown episodes
1997	Remember WENN	Blair Foley	Episode: "Like a Brother"
2001	Between the Lions	Lester the Jester	Episode: "Quest, Quest, Quest!"
2002	Monday Night Mayhem	Jim McKay	Television movie
2018	Madam Secretary	Earl	Episode: "Sound and Fury"

== Theatre ==
Year	Title	Role	Venue
1992	My Favorite Year	Ensemble	Vivian Beaumont Theatre, Broadway
1993	The Goodbye Girl	Elliot (standby)	Marquis Theatre, Broadway
1995	Swinging on a Star	Various roles	Music Box Theatre, Broadway
1998	Little Me	Bruce / Bernie / Bert	Criterion Center Stage, Broadway
2003	Wonderful Town	Chick Clark	Al Hirschfeld Theatre, Broadway
2005	Spamalot	Patsy / Mayor / Guard 2	Shubert Theatre, Broadway
2007	Is He Dead?	Agamemnon Buckner	Lyceum Theatre, Broadway
2009	Memphis	Mr. Simmons	Shubert Theatre, Broadway
2011	Born Yesterday	Eddie Brock	Cort Theatre, Broadway
2012	Nice Work If You Can Get It	Cookie McGee	Imperial Theatre, Broadway
2015	On the Twentieth Century	Owen O'Malley	American Airlines Theatre, Broadway
2016	She Loves Me	Ladislav Sipos	Studio 54, Broadway
2016	The Front Page	Walter Burns (standby)	Broadhurst Theatre, Broadway
2019	Tootsie	Stan Fields	Marquis Theatre, Broadway
2022	Plaza Suite	Sam / Jesse / Roy (standby)	Hudson Theatre, Broadway
2023	Little Shop of Horrors	Mr. Mushnik	The Muny

== Awards and nominations ==
Year	Award	Category	Work	Result
1996	Drama Desk Award	Outstanding Featured Actor in a Musical	Swinging on a Star	Nominated
1996	Theatre World Award		Swinging on a Star	Honoree
2005	Tony Award	Best Featured Actor in a Musical	Spamalot	Nominated
2005	Drama Desk Award	Outstanding Featured Actor in a Musical	Spamalot	Nominated
2012	Tony Award	Best Featured Actor in a Musical	Nice Work if You Can Get It	Won
2012	Drama Desk Award	Outstanding Featured Actor in a Musical	Nice Work if You Can Get It	Won
2012	Outer Critics Circle Award	Outstanding Featured Actor in a Musical	Nice Work if You Can Get It	Won
