= William Preston (actor) =

American actor (1921–1998)

- Preston circa 1970s without a beard
- Born: August 26, 1921
- Died: July 10, 1998 (aged 76); New York, NY, US
- Occupation: Actor
- Years active: ~1968 - 1998

William Preston (August 26, 1921 – July 10, 1998) was an American actor from Manheim, Pennsylvania. He did not begin acting until the age of 47 but subsequently appeared in more than sixty productions of Shakespeare's plays. He had a Master's degree in English literature from Penn State. He is perhaps best known for his role as recurring character Carl "Oldie" Olsen on Late Night with Conan O'Brien. Among his many movie roles, he played John, the bum, from The Fisher King (1991), a blacksmith in Far and Away (1992), and the flask mourner in Family Business (1989). He later appeared in Waterworld (1995), Reckless (1995), Blue in the Face (1995), and The Crucible (1996).

He died at Saint Vincent's Hospital in Manhattan on July 10, 1998.

== Filmography ==
Year	Title	Role	Notes
1973	Malatesta's Carnival of Blood	Sticker	
1985	Goodbye, New York	Elevator Man	
1989	Family Business	Flask Mourner	
1990	The Exorcist III	Old Man in Wheelchair	
1991	The Fisher King	John the Bum	
1992	Far and Away	Blacksmith	
1993	Me and Veronica	Old Man	
1994	My Summer Story	Grandpa Bumpus	
1995	Blue in the Face	Statistician	
1995	Waterworld	Depth Gauge	
1995	Reckless	Porter	
1995	Flasher	Flasher	
1996	Joe's Apartment	Complaint Handler	
1996	The Crucible	George Jacobs	
1996	I'm Not Rappaport	Jake	
1998	Illuminata	Old toothless man	
