= Jacquelyn Piro Donovan =

American actress and singer

Jacquelyn Piro Donovan is an American actress and singer known for her work in broadway musicals and on the concert stage. She is perhaps best known for the distinction of being the only actress to portray both the young innocent Cosette and the tragic heroine Fantine in the original Broadway production of Les Misérables.

== Early life ==
Donovan was born in Boston and raised in Wellesley, Massachusetts. She is the youngest daughter of Anthony J. Piro, an accomplished Medical and Radiation Oncologist and Marian Piro, a special education teacher. She graduated from Lynnfield High School in Lynnfield, Massachusetts and received her BFA in acting from Boston University. In 2004, Donovan married broadway stagehand Peter Donovan, who most recently worked on the broadway company of Billy Elliot and is presently preparing Nice Work If You Can Get It.

== Stage career ==
Donovan's career started before she graduated from college. During her senior year, she received her Equity Card standing by for Carolee Carmello in the Boston Company of Nite Club Confidential starring Scott Bakula. Shortly after graduation, she auditioned for the National Tour of Les Miserables through an "open call" and was cast as Cosette. She went on to originate that role in the Third National and San Francisco Companies and in 1990 reprised the role for her Broadway debut. In 1996 and most recently 2002, she returned to Broadway as Cosette's mother Fantine.

Starting in 1992, and for the next decade, she starred in the National Touring Companies of Sunset Boulevard (as Betty Schaefer opposite Petula Clark), Big (originating Susan Lawrence), The Secret Garden (as Lily), Miss Saigon (as Ellen, a role she later played on Broadway in 2000), and in 2008, she played Mama Who for the seasonal Broadway Production of How the Grinch Stole Christmas!, playing her hometown of Boston. During her year with Miss Saigon, Donovan was granted a leave of absence to perform as Nellie in Jerome Kern and Oscar Hammerstein's Sweet Adeline at the nationally celebrated City Center Encores! concert series on Broadway.

She created the world premiere roles of Madame Calcet in the Zipper Theatre's production of Kathie Lee Gifford's Under The Bridge, Sariah in 37 Art's production of The Ark, Alison in the Emmy Award winning writer David Javerbaum's original production of Suburb, a New Musical Comedy at The York Theatre, Jackie in New World Stage's New York Musical Theatre Festival production of Have a NIce Life, winning the 2006 Outstanding Ensemble NYMF Excellence Award, and most recently, the title role in The York Theatre's production of I Remember Mama, as part of their Musicals in Mufti Series 2010.

In 2004, Donovan won the Helen Hayes Award for Best Actress for her portrayal of Lizzie Curry in 110 in the Shade at the Signature Theatre in Washington, D.C., where she also originated the role of Elmira in the world premiere of the musical Nevermore. She won a Connecticut Critics Circle Award in 2005 for her portrayal of Milly in Seven Brides for Seven Brothers at the Goodspeed Opera House.

On May 2, 2011, it was announced that Donovan would take over the title role in Hello, Dolly!, produced by North Carolina Theatre, late in rehearsals. Cybill Shepherd had withdrawn from the production after sustaining injuries in a mishap on stairs at her apartment complex. Almost exactly one year later, on May 11, 2012, history repeated itself when it was announced she would replace an injured Lorna Luft as Dolly in the North Shore Musical Theater's production of the same show.

From 2013 to 2014, she played Miss Gulch/The Wicked Witch of the West in the North American tour of The Wizard of Oz.

== Stage credits ==
- Gypsy (Louise) Westchester Broadway Theatre 1991
