= Lenny Baker =

American actor (1945–1982)

- from Next Stop, Greenwich Village, 1976
- Born: Leonard Joel Baker; January 17, 1945; Brookline, Massachusetts, U.S.
- Died: April 12, 1982 (aged 37); Hallandale, Florida, U.S.
- Occupation: Actor
- Years active: 1966–1980
- Awards: Tony Award for I Love My Wife

Leonard Joel Baker (January 17, 1945 – April 12, 1982) was an American actor of stage, film, and television, best known for his performance in the 1976 Paul Mazursky film Next Stop, Greenwich Village and his 1977 performance in the stage play I Love My Wife.

== Early life and education ==
Baker was born in Brookline, Massachusetts, the middle child of William, who owned his own plumbing business, and Bertha (née August) Baker. He had two brothers, Alan and Malcolm, and described his upbringing as "middle-middle class."

As the middle child, he referred to himself as "the pickle in the middle" and dreamed of being in musicals. He began acting in kindergarten, where he was cast as an elephant in a school play, and from fourth grade on, he was "constantly" on stage, eventually becoming the vice president of Brookline High School's dramatic society.

While his brothers followed his father into plumbing, Baker stuck to acting. After graduating from high school, in 1962, he went to Boston University, where he majored in acting. He graduated in 1966. Throughout college, he appeared in the Spa Music Theatre in Saratoga Springs, New York, with Boston University's Theatre Division, and with the Harvard Summer Players at the Loeb Drama Center.

== Career ==
=== Theatre ===
Baker described himself as a "skinny, silly shlump." He played offbeat characters, which he described as being "long, skinny funny-looking goofy types."

Coming out of college, Baker claimed to have offers to do theatre in New York, which he turned down out of fear of being reduced to "a spear carrier." Instead, he accepted an offer from Richard Block, the director of the Actors Theatre of Louisville (ATL) in Kentucky, to be a journeyman, rounding out its 10 principal cast members:

...I jumped at it [the chance to join ATL]. Decided it would be much better to play bigger roles...to be a big fish in a little pond."

In September 1966, he made his acting debut, playing Tom Stark in All the King's Men, at ATL. The following year, he made Actors' Equity and earned the minimum, $125 per week (approximately $950 in 2019). He remained at ATL through May 1968.

He then went to the Center Stage in Baltimore until he made his Off Broadway debut in 1969 in City Scene. He followed with three plays by Israel Horovitz at the Manhattan Theatre Club, a performance in The Year Boston Won the Pennant at Lincoln Center, as well as roles in Summertree and The Real Inspector Hound.

In 1974, Baker went to Paris, where he performed two Israel Horovitz one-act plays: Hop Scotch and Spared. The same year, he made his Broadway debut in The Freedom of the Theatre. In 1976, he performed with the Phoenix Company in Secret Service, Boy Meets Girl, Pericles, Prince of Tyre, and The Merry Wives of Windsor. He later did a season with the New York Shakespeare Festival, during which he appeared in Henry V and Measure for Measure. However, his biggest performance was in I Love My Wife.

Beyond Broadway, Baker performed in other regional theater productions in Chicago, St. Louis, and his native Boston. He spent five summers at the O'Neill Center's National Playwrights Conference and its Theatre for the Deaf in Waterford, Connecticut, working with young playwrights. He called his time at the O'Neill Theatre his "best training," stating that watching the deaf taught him to be "so brazen with the comic use of his body."

In August 1977, Baker's Broadway contract was due to be re-negotiated. He was hesitant to commit to more than one year, stating:

At my age, it would be committing artistic suicide...I have to be able to expand myself to my outermost limits.

=== Film and television ===
Baker appeared in a number of television shows, such as Kojak, Starsky and Hutch, The Rockford Files, and Taxi. In 1973, he appeared in the acclaimed TV film Pueblo.

His most prominent film roles include The Paper Chase and the lead in Next Stop, Greenwich Village, Paul Mazursky's 1976 semi-autobiographical film.

== Personal life ==
At the height of his career, Baker was 6 ft 0 in (1.83 m) tall and 145 pounds (66 kg) in weight. He was knob-kneed and was described as a "long, lean and lanky, stringbean of a chap with the most formidable nose in entertainment since Jimmy Durante." It was often due to his physique and nose that he got auditions, jobs and laughs. However, as a child, Baker had been self-conscious about his body, particularly his prominent nose:

There was a time when my nose bothered me. In my adolescence, I thought, "What am I stuck with here?" It seemed to me that the only thing growing on my body was my nose. I went through an awkward stage when I felt out of place. Now I'm very happy with the nose and this body and who I am."

On opening night of I Love My Wife, his apartment was burglarized. Along with his television set, his bar-mitzvah ring was stolen.

Baker was a feminist. In 1977, during his run of I Love My Wife, he used his fame to vocally state his dissatisfaction with The Shubert Organization –– the organization running the Barrymore Theatre, where the play was being performed –– about pay equity:

And put it down too that I'm mad because the girls in our cast are getting less (money) than the boys. I find that outrageous discrimination and it really burns me.

Baker was a proponent of actors going to college, believing a "good liberal education is essential" to grounding actors in all the arts.

Later in his career, he expressed wanting to become a playwright and forming a repertory company with Paul Mazursky and Leonard Nimoy.

Little is known of Baker's romantic life. In 1976, he claimed to be "dedicated to remaining a bachelor," but alluded to serious romances with "two or three" women.

== Death ==
In August 1978, Baker's career began to be cut short by thyroid cancer. Baker underwent surgery to remove the cancer. During one of these surgeries Baker's vocal cords were seriously damaged, causing irreparable damage to his voice. Despite the cancer and the damage done to his vocal cords, Baker continued to get parts and work as an actor. "A serious throat ailment," according to articles in the Detroit Free Press and the Hartford Courant published during that month, caused him to leave the cast of the pre-Broadway show Broadway, Broadway. His final television performance was a guest-star appearance on the sitcom Taxi in 1979. His last noted stage performance was in March 1980, in which he reprised the one-act Horovitz plays he had performed in Paris.

He was eventually diagnosed with Medullary thyroid cancer. Decades after Baker's death, commentator David Ehrenstein incorrectly speculated in LA Weekly that Baker had suffered from AIDS, then known as "gay-related immune deficiency" (GRID), for approximately two years before his death. Ehrenstein's 2003 LA Weekly essay includes a quote from actor Anthony Holland that indicates that Baker lived in Los Angeles in 1980.

...poor Lenny Baker. Nobody sees him anymore. He’s up there [in his apartment] alone now. He’s dying of cancer, and the doctors can’t seem to figure out why.

— Anthony Holland, Actor, 1980

As Baker's illness worsened, he moved to Miami to live with his parents. He died on April 12, 1982, at the Community Hospital of South Broward in Hallandale Beach, Florida. He is buried in Moses Mendelsohn Memorial Park in Randolph, Massachusetts.

== Stage ==
Broadway

- The Freedom of the City – Alvin Theatre, 1974
- Secret Service – Playhouse Theatre, 1976 as Henry Dumont
- Boy Meets Girl – Playhouse Theatre, 1976 as Robert Law
- I Love My Wife – Ethel Barrymore Theatre, 1977 as Alvin

Off Broadway

- Conerico Was Here to Stay – Fortune Theatre, 1969 as Young Man
- Summertree – Players Theatre, 1969 as Young Man
- Paradise Gardens East – Fortune Theatre, 1969 as Brother
- The Year Boston Won the Pennant – Mitzi Newhouse Theatre, 1969 as Dillinger/Peabody
- Barbary Shore – Joseph Papp Public Theater/New York Shakespeare Festival, 1973 as Mike Lovett
- Pericles, Prince of Tyre – Joseph Papp Public Theater/New York Shakespeare Festival, 1974 as Thailard/Knight of Ephesus/Boult
- The Merry Wives of Windsor – Joseph Papp Public Theater/New York Shakespeare Festival, 1974 as Abraham Slender
- Henry V – Joseph Papp Public Theater/New York Shakespeare Festival, 1976 as Dauphin
- Measure for Measure – Joseph Papp Public Theater/New York Shakespeare Festival, 1976 as Lucio

== Film ==
- The Hospital (1971) as Dr. Schaefer
- A.W.O.L. (1972) as Sidney Feitel
- The Paper Chase (1973) as William Moss
- Malatesta's Carnival of Blood (1973) as Sonja
- Next Stop, Greenwich Village (1976) as Larry Lapinsky

== Television ==
- The Teaching (1970, TV movie) as Samuel Golden
- Pueblo (1973, TV movie) as Ens. T.L. Harris
- Kojak (1974, episode: "Cross Your Heart and Hope to Die") as Joyce Harrington
- Sunshine (1975, episode: "White Bread and Margarine") as Jinx
- Secret Service (1977, episode: "Secret Service") as Henry Dumont
- The Rubber Gun Squad (1977, TV movie) as Eddie
- Starsky and Hutch (1979, episode: "Ninety Pounds of Trouble") as Damon
- The Rockford Files (1979, episode: "Only Rock 'n' Roll Will Never Die" Parts 1 and 2) as Ronny Martz
- Taxi (1979, episode: "Latka's Revolting") as Baschi (final appearance)

== Accolades ==
Baker was highly praised by critics, including Clive Barnes and Walter Kerr.

He was nominated for Jeff Awards –– for Best Actor in a Principal Role –– for his work in Chicago theatre.

He won the Tony Award for his performance in I Love My Wife.

His performance in Next Stop, Greenwich Village was nominated for a Golden Globe Award in the "Best Acting Debut in a Motion Picture" category.
