= I Love My Wife =

1977–79 Broadway musical

- Original Broadway production logo; Illustration by Hilary Knight
- Music: Cy Coleman
- Lyrics: Michael Stewart
- Book: Michael Stewart
- Basis: Viens chez moi, j'habite chez une copine by Luis Rego, Didier Kaminka, Jean-Luc Voulfow and Jean-Paul Sèvres
- Productions: 1977 Broadway; 1977 West End; 1977 Madrid; 1978 Johannesburg; 1979 Buenos Aires; 1982 Sydney; 2004 Nyack; 2008 Brentwood

I Love My Wife is a musical with a book and lyrics by Michael Stewart and music by Cy Coleman, based on the French play Viens chez moi, j'habite chez une copine (lit. 'Come up to my place, I'm living at a girlfriend's'), written by Luis Rego and Didier Kaminka with the collaboration of Jean-Luc Voulfow and Jean-Paul Sèvres.

A satire of the sexual revolution of the 1970s, the musical takes place on Christmas Eve in suburban Trenton, New Jersey, where two married couples who have been close friends since high school find themselves contemplating a ménage-à-quatre.

The original play was also adapted into a 1981 French film, though that film and the play have little in common besides the title.

== Synopsis ==
In Trenton, New Jersey, old high school buddies Wally (now an executive in public relations) and Alvin (a furniture mover) discuss the possibility of adding some spice to their lives by having a foursome. Alvin suggests to his wife Cleo that they share their bed with Monica, Wally's wife. Cleo thinks that she would enjoy Wally. They agree that whoever enters first becomes the evening's partner, but the couple walks in together. After Monica leaves, the three discuss the situation and decide on a foursome on Christmas Eve.

Alvin and Cleo arrive for dinner on Christmas Eve, and while Monica is initially unhappy with the arrangement, she ultimately agrees. Too excited to eat: they undress, get into bed, and have some pot to relax. As Wally suggests ideas from a sex manual, the group discards all the options.

== Song list ==
Act I

- We're Still Friends - Company
- Monica - Alvin, Monica and Four Guys
- By Threes - Wally, Alvin and Harvey
- A Mover's Life - Alvin and Four Guys
- Love Revolution - Cleo
- Someone Wonderful I Missed - Monica and Cleo
- Sexually Free - Alvin, Cleo and Wally

Act II

- Hey There, Good Times - Harvey, Stanley, Quentin and Norman
- Lovers on Christmas Eve - Monica, Wally and Norman
- Scream - Harvey, Stanley, Quentin and Norman
- Everybody Today is Turning On - Alvin and Wally
- Married Couple Seeks Married Couple - Alvin, Cleo, Wally and Monica
- I Love My Wife - Alvin and Wally

== Productions ==
The title song was notably recorded by Frank Sinatra in 1976 and released as a single in January 1977, before the musical had even premiered. This created what Billboard called "a crest of pre-opening publicity".

The pre-Broadway tryout opened at the Forrest Theatre in Philadelphia on March 21, 1977. The Broadway production opened at the Ethel Barrymore Theatre on April 17, 1977, and closed on May 20, 1979, after 857 performances and seven previews. Directed by Gene Saks and choreographed by Onna White, the cast included James Naughton as Wally, Joanna Gleason as Monica, Lenny Baker, as Alvin, Ilene Graff as Cleo, Michael Mark (guitar) as Stanley, Joseph Saulter (drums) as Quenton, John Miller (bass) as Harvey, and Ken Bichel (piano) as Norman. During the show's run, cast replacements included Tom and Dick Smothers, Tom Wopat, Janie Sell and, in an African American version, Lawrence Hilton-Jacobs, Hattie Winston, and Barbara Sharma. Original director and choreographer Joe Layton was replaced due to injuries sustained in a fall.

The West End production opened at the Prince of Wales Theatre on October 6, 1977, where it ran for 401 performances. It was nominated for the Laurence Olivier Award for Musical of the Year. The show originally starred Porridge and Rising Damp star Richard Beckinsale, who was replaced as the lead mid-run by Confessions of a Window Cleaner actor Robin Askwith.

The band consisted of four on-stage musicians who were among the friends and acted in the opening scene. The show was filled with their shenanigans in the background during the songs. They sang along with some of the numbers and sometimes one of them took a solo and sang alone.

The Helen Hayes Theatre in Nyack, New York, presented the musical in April 2004.

A production was staged by the Reprise Theatre Company, Brentwood Theatre, Brentwood, California, in December 2008. This starred Jason Alexander (Alvin), Vicki Lewis (Cleo), Patrick Cassidy (Wally), and Lea Thompson (Monica).

== Response ==
=== Critical reviews ===
Clive Barnes, reviewing for The New York Times, wrote that the musical is "bright, inventive, amusing and breezy." He noted that what Coleman and Stewart did regarding the band "is breathtakingly simple, but none...has ever done it before. They have taken the band and put it up on stage...The musicians are welded into the play, as a kind of Greek chorus." He especially noted that "It is a gorgeous cast-just right." Finally, he called the musical "mildly sexy, vastly diverting and highly amusing."

== Awards and nominations ==
=== Original Broadway production ===
Year	Award	Category	Nominee	Result
1977	Tony Award	Best Musical		Nominated
1977	Tony Award	Best Book of a Musical	Michael Stewart	Nominated
1977	Tony Award	Best Original Score	Cy Coleman and Michael Stewart	Nominated
1977	Tony Award	Best Performance by a Featured Actor in a Musical	Lenny Baker	Won
1977	Tony Award	Best Direction of a Musical	Gene Saks	Won
1977	Tony Award	Best Choreography	Onna White	Nominated
1977	Drama Desk Award	Outstanding Musical		Nominated
1977	Drama Desk Award	Outstanding Actor in a Musical	Lenny Baker	Won
1977	Drama Desk Award	Outstanding Featured Actor in a Musical	Ken Bichel	Won
1977	Drama Desk Award	Outstanding Featured Actor in a Musical	Michael Mark	Won
1977	Drama Desk Award	Outstanding Featured Actor in a Musical	John Miller	Won
1977	Drama Desk Award	Outstanding Featured Actor in a Musical	Joseph Saulter	Won
1977	Drama Desk Award	Outstanding Director of a Musical	Gene Saks	Nominated
1977	Drama Desk Award	Outstanding Music	Cy Coleman	Won
1977	Theatre World Award		Joanna Gleason	Won
1977	New York Drama Critics' Circle Award	Best Musical	Cy Coleman and Michael Stewart	Runner-up

=== Original London production ===
Year	Award	Category	Nominee	Result
1977	Laurence Olivier Award	Best New Musical		Nominated

== Watch and listen ==
- I Love My Wife excerpt - YouTube
- I Love My Wife excerpt - YouTube
- I Love My Wife: A Musical (1977 Original Broadway Cast Recording) CD (April 10, 1992) DRG Records (ASIN: B000000PG7)
- Broadway Bound 216: Yesterday & Today plus Cy Coleman - The Public Radio Exchange (PRX)
- "Everybody Today is Turning On": Bea Arthur & Rock Hudson - The Beatrice Arthur Special
