= Birds of Paradise (musical) =

Birds Of Paradise
- Music: David Evans
- Lyrics: Winnie Holzman
- Book: David Evans and Winnie Holzman
- Productions: 1987 Off-Broadway; 2017 London

Birds of Paradise is a musical with music by David Evans, lyrics by Winnie Holzman, and the book by Evans and Holzman. It had a brief run off-Broadway in 1987. The story involves a group of amateur actors involved in a musical adaptation of Anton Chekhov's 1896 play The Seagull.

== Synopsis ==
=== Act I ===
The Harbour Island Players is an amateur theatre group whose lives are turned upside down when a professional actor, down on his luck, decides to direct and star in one of their productions. The group is awaiting the arrival of Lawrence Wood, the actor. Wood, who grew up on Harbour Island (and left as soon as he could) is visiting his hometown for the first time in twenty years. He has agreed to observe their rehearsal. Thrilled at the prospect of a real professional in their midst, each member feels, for the first time since they've been working together, that it is finally "worth it" ("So Many Nights"). Wood arrives and we learn that he is in trouble, both personally and professionally. The amateurs are dazzled by his presence and blind to his problems.

Wood is interrupted by the sudden arrival of Julia, who bursts in dressed as a kind of moon-sprite and begs to be allowed to perform a song written by Homer, a young writer/composer who is also a member of the group. It is from his bizarre musical adaptation of Anton Chekhov's The Seagull, aptly named Seagull. Over the group's protests, Wood asks to hear the song, an eerie ballad about a young girl who flies to the moon only to find she cannot get back down ("Every Day Is Night"). Intrigued by the song, by Homer's loony talent, and most of all, by Julia. Wood asks to see the script and reflects on how good it feels to be a big fish in a little pond ("Somebody"). In an attempt to recover what has been missing in his life, Wood offers to direct and star in Homer's show. The others are beside themselves with excitement, especially Marjorie, Homer's mother, who still carries a torch for Wood from high school days.

The next morning, Julia and Homer arrive early for rehearsal. Since childhood, Homer has been unrequitedly in love with Julia. Before rehearsal, they both fantasize about how the events of the past evening might change their lives ("Coming True"). The rest of the group arrives and, in a sequence that tracks the first weeks of rehearsal, Homer discovers what it is like to work with a real professional ("It's Only A Play").

As the final week of rehearsals approaches, Andy (Wood's brother) gives him a message about a call from his agent in New York. Wood claims he is not interested and Andy seizes the opportunity to confide in his brother about his rich fantasy life ("She's Out There"). Later, in the middle of a disastrous rehearsal, Wood takes Marjorie, Hope, and Stella aside and encourages them to "open up" emotionally. This results in a hilarious misunderstanding as the ladies attempt to make sense of what he said ("Birds of Paradise").

Wood calls his agent in New York and is furious to learn that she wants him to audition for a part that he feels is beneath him. When the rehearsal reconvenes, he vents his rage on Homer, insisting that he slow down one of the numbers. Homer, equally enraged, deliberately plays it as slowly as possible, transforming it into an expression of each group member's unrequited love. As the song reaches its climax, Wood and Julia steal a clandestine kiss, unwittingly, witnessed by a heartbroken Homer ("Imagining You").

=== Act II ===
It is the night before dress rehearsal. With great conviction (and in penguin suits) Andy, Hope, and Dave perform a number from Seagull and demonstrate how far they've come ("Penguins Must Sing"). The rehearsal continues and Wood attacks Marjorie for her lack of commitment to her character and goads her into a deeply felt rendition of ("You're Mine"). Meanwhile, Homer is intent on re-writing the end of his play, determined to make it a bleak and bitter reflection of his present circumstances. After a devastating encounter with Julia, he tears up what he has written and seeks solace at the piano remembering a song he wrote as a child ("Things I Can't Forget"). Marjorie surprises them both by picking up the pieces and mother and son end up - for the first time - comforting each other ("After Opening Night").

During dress rehearsal, as the actors are deep in character and loving every miserable minute, they give thanks to the man who made their lives worth living ("Chekhov"). Wood enters with a crushing announcement: he has been offered the part in New York and he must leave that night. Julia runs off, believing she is included in his plans. The group is devastated. Homer tries to convince him to stay, but Wood goes, leaving Julia behind, her illusions destroyed. Homer threatens to leave as well when all at once the group discovers the pages of his re-written final scene. They fall in love with the surprising new twists he has created for each of their characters. As they begin to piece the new ending together, they find a new appreciation for what they mean to each other ("Something New").

== Musical numbers ==
Act I

- "So Many Nights" - Homer, Marjorie, Stella, Andy, Hope & Dave
- "Diva" - Hope, Dave & Andy
- "Every Day is Night" - Julia
- "Somebody" - Wood & Company
- "Coming True" - Homer & Julia
- "It's Only a Play" - Homer & Company
- "She's Out There" - Andy
- "Birds of Paradise" - Majorie, Stella & Hope
- "Imagining You" - Company

Act II

- "Penguins Must Sing" - Dave, Hope & Andy
- "You're Mine" - Marjorie
- "Things I Can't Forget" - Homer & Marjorie
- "After Opening Night" - Homer & Marjorie
- "Chekhov" - Company
- "Something New" - Company

== Production history ==
Holzman wrote the musical with composer Evans when she was attending New York University.

The musical premiered at the Off-Broadway Promenade Theatre on October 26, 1987, and closed on November 5, 1987, after 29 previews and 24 performances. The director was Arthur Laurents, with sets by Philipp Jung, costumes by David Murin, lights by Paul Gallo, musical staging by Linda Haberman, and musical direction by Frederick Weldy. The band consisted of Weldy (Keyboard), James Stenborg (Keyboard), Rick Heckman (Woodwinds), Russ Rizner (French Horn), Jeffrey Szabo (Cello), John A Babich (Bass), and Glenn Rhian (Percussion).

The cast starred Todd Graff (Homer), John Cunningham (Lawrence Wood), Crista Moore (Julia), Mary Beth Peil (Marjorie), Andrew Hill Newman (Dave), Donna Murphy (Hope), J. K. Simmons (Andy), and Barbara Walsh (Stella).

The musical made its European premiere at the Drayton Arms Theatre, London on May 2, 2017 running for over 40 performances. The musical starred Ashley Knight (Lawrence Wood), Ryan Taylor (Andy), James Kenneth Haughan (Homer), Lottie Johnson (Julia) and Victoria Waddington (Marjorie).
