= Hervé Villechaize =

French actor (1943–1993)

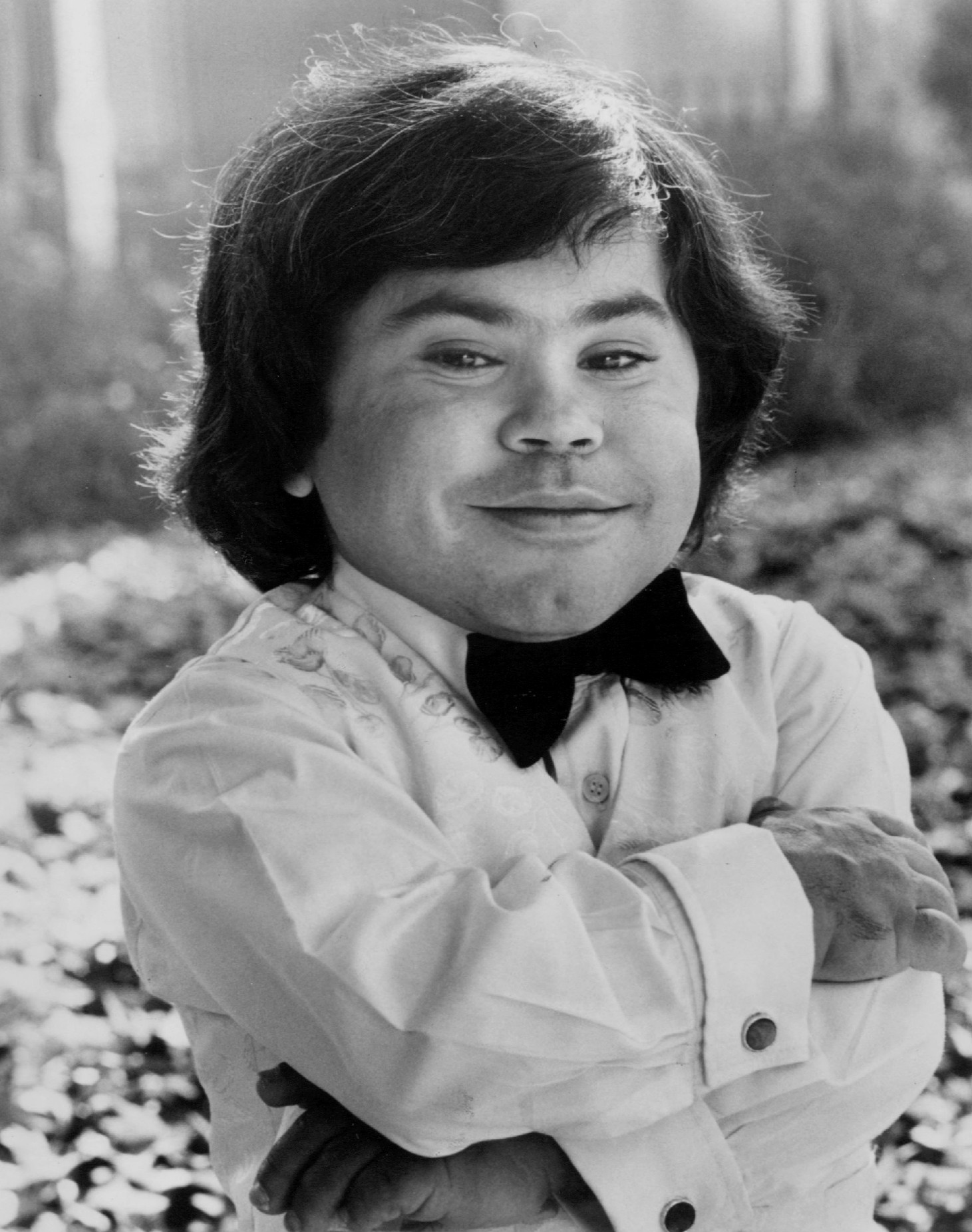
- Villechaize in 1977
- Born: Hervé Jean-Pierre Villechaize; 23 April 1943; Montauban, France
- Died: 4 September 1993 (aged 50); North Hollywood, California, U.S.
- Occupation: Actor
- Years active: 1966–1993
- Notable work: Nick Nack in The Man with the Golden Gun (1974); Spider in Seizure (1974); King Fausto in Forbidden Zone (1980); Smiley in Two Moon Junction (1988)
- Television: Fantasy Island
- Height: 3 ft 11 in (119 cm)
- Spouses: Anne Sadowski (m. 1970; div. 1979) Camille Hagen (m. 1980; div. 1982)

Hervé Jean-Pierre Villechaize (French: [ɛʁve vilʃɛz]; 23 April 1943 – 4 September 1993) was a French actor. He is best known for his roles as the evil henchman Nick Nack in the 1974 James Bond film The Man with the Golden Gun and as Mr. Roarke's assistant, Tattoo, on the American television series Fantasy Island that he played from 1977 to 1983. On Fantasy Island, his shout of "De plane! De plane!" became one of the show's signature phrases. He died by suicide in 1993.

== Early life ==
Villechaize was born in Nazi-occupied Paris on 23 April 1943, to Evelyn Recchionni, an Anglo-Italian socialite who was an ambulance driver during World War II and André Villechaize, a surgeon in Toulon. Villechaize also had German ancestry. The youngest of four sons, Villechaize was born with dwarfism, likely due to an endocrine disorder, which his surgeon father tried unsuccessfully to cure in several institutions. In later years, he insisted on being called a "midget" rather than a "dwarf", which annoyed his acting contemporary with a similar condition, Billy Barty, who was an activist who found that term derogatory. Villechaize was bullied at school for his condition and found solace in painting. In 1959, at age 16, he entered the École des Beaux-Arts to study art. In 1961, at age 18, he became the youngest artist ever to have his work displayed in the Museum of Paris.

In 1964, Villechaize left France for the United States. He settled in a Bohemian section of New York City, and learned English by watching television.

== Career ==
Villechaize initially worked as an artist, painter, and photographer. He began acting in off-Broadway productions, including Werner Liepolt's The Young Master Dante and a play by Sam Shepard, and he also modelled for photos for National Lampoon before moving on to film.

His first film appearance was in Chappaqua (1966). His second film was Edward Summer's Item 72-D: The Adventures of Spa and Fon, filmed in 1969. This was followed by several films, including The Gang That Couldn't Shoot Straight (1971); Christopher Speeth and Werner Liepolt's Malatesta's Carnival of Blood (1973); Crazy Joe (1974); and Oliver Stone's first film, Seizure (1974). He was asked to play a role in Alejandro Jodorowsky's film Dune, which had originally begun pre-production in 1971, but was later cancelled.

Villechaize's big break was being cast in The Man with the Golden Gun (1974), by which time he had become so poor that he was living in his car in Los Angeles. Prior to being signed by Bond producer Albert R. Broccoli, he made ends meet by working as a rat catcher's assistant near his South Central home. From what his co-star Christopher Lee saw, The Man with the Golden Gun filming was possibly the happiest time of Villechaize's life; Lee likened it to honey in the sandwich between an insecure past and an uncertain future.

In the 1970s, Villechaize performed Oscar the Grouch on Sesame Street as a pair of legs peeping out from Oscar's trash can, for scenes that required Oscar to be mobile. These appearances began in the third season, and included the 1978 Hawaii episodes.

In 1980, Cleveland International Records released a single by the Children of the World, featuring Villechaize as vocalist: "Why", with B-side "When a Child Is Born".

Though popular with the public, Villechaize proved a difficult actor on Fantasy Island, where he continually propositioned women and quarreled with the producers. He was eventually fired after demanding a salary on par with that of his co-star Ricardo Montalbán. For its final season from '83-'84, Villechaize was replaced by Christopher Hewett.

Villechaize also starred in the movie Forbidden Zone (1982), and appeared in Airplane II: The Sequel (1982), and episodes of Diff'rent Strokes and Taxi. He later played the title role in the "Rumpelstiltskin" episode of Shelley Duvall's Faerie Tale Theatre. In the 1980s, he became popular in Spain due to his impersonations of Prime Minister Felipe González on the television show Viaje con nosotros (Travel with Us), with showman Javier Gurruchaga. His final appearance was a cameo as himself in an episode of The Ben Stiller Show.

== Personal life and death ==
In the mid-1970s, Villechaize met actress Susan Tyrrell. According to Tyrrell, they had a two-year relationship and shared a home in Laurel Canyon, Los Angeles.

Villechaize married twice. He married his first wife, artist Anne Sadowski, in 1970. After Villechaize's serial infidelities, as well as ridicule over their height difference, they divorced in 1978 or 1979 (sources differ). He met his second wife, Camille Hagen, an actress and stand-in double, in 1977 on the set of the pilot for Fantasy Island. They married in 1980 and Hagen filed for divorce 15 months later. During their marriage, they lived at a 1.5-acre (0.61 ha) San Fernando Valley ranch, which also was home to a menagerie of farm animals and pets.

In the early afternoon of 4 September 1993, at his North Hollywood home, Villechaize, aged 50, is believed to have first fired a shot through the sliding-glass patio door to awaken his longtime girlfriend, Kathy Self, before shooting himself. Self found Villechaize in his backyard, and he was pronounced dead at the North Hollywood Medical Center. He was cremated and his ashes were scattered into the Pacific Ocean off Point Fermin in San Pedro, Los Angeles.

Villechaize left a suicide note saying he was despondent over longtime health problems. He was suffering from chronic pain, due to having oversized internal organs putting increasing pressure on his body. According to Self, Villechaize often slept in a kneeling position, so he could breathe more easily. He also left an audio recording of the suicide that included his last words.

At the time of his death, Villechaize was in negotiations with Cartoon Network for him to co-star in Space Ghost Coast to Coast, which was then in pre-production; he would have voiced Space Ghost's sidekick on the show.

== Depictions in media ==
Sacha Gervasi spent several years writing a script about Villechaize. Gervasi conducted a lengthy interview with Villechaize just prior to his death. The film My Dinner with Hervé, which is based on the last few days of Villechaize's life, stars Peter Dinklage in the title role, and premiered on HBO on 20 October 2018.

== Filmography ==
Hervé Villechaize filmography
Film
Year	Title	Role	Notes
1966	Chappaqua	Little Person	Uncredited
1970	Maidstone	Mr Louda	
1971	The Gang That Couldn't Shoot Straight	Beppo	
1972	The Last Stop	Deputy	
1972	Greaser's Palace	Mr. Spitunia	
1973	Malatesta's Carnival of Blood	Bobo	
1974	Seizure	The Spider	
1974	Crazy Joe	Samson	
1974	The Man with the Golden Gun	Nick Nack	
1977	Hot Tomorrows	Alberict	
1978	The One and Only	Milton Miller	
1980	Forbidden Zone	King Fausto of the Sixth Dimension	
1982	Airplane II: The Sequel	Little Breather	
1988	The Telephone	Freeway	Voice
1988	Two Moon Junction	Smiley	
Television
Year	Title	Role	Notes
1977–1983	Fantasy Island	Tattoo	130 episodes; 2 TV films
1980	Taxi	Himself	season 2, episode 23: "Fantasy Borough"
1982	The Fall Guy	Himself	season 1, episode 22: "The Scavenger Hunt"
1982	Faerie Tale Theatre	Rumpelstiltskin	
1992	Larry Sanders Show	Himself	Season 1, Episode 4: "The Guest Host"
1992	Phil Donahue Show	Himself	Famous Past Celebrities
-	The Ben Stiller Show	Himself	

== Publications ==
Chris Distin: James Bond – Golden Gun on Location : behind the scenes with Hervé Villechaize on the sets of The Man with the Golden Gun 1974, Braunschweig : DAMOKLES, 2024, ISBN 978-3-9824063-7-4
