= Don Bichel =

Australian cricketer

Personal information
- Born: 4 May 1935; Lowood, Queensland, Australia
- Died: 11 October 2004 (aged 69); Brisbane, Queensland, Australia
- Source: Cricinfo, 1 October 2020

Don Bichel (4 May 1935 – 11 October 2004) was an Australian cricketer. He played in three first-class matches for Queensland between 1963 and 1965.

== See also ==
- List of Queensland first-class cricketers
