= Crista Moore =

American actress, singer, and dancer

- Occupation: Actress/Singer/Dancer
- Years active: 1986-Present
- Website: www.cristamoore.com

Crista Moore is an American actress, singer, and dancer known for her work on the Broadway stage. She has been nominated for two Tony Awards, and received a Theatre World Award.

== Theatre ==
Moore made her Broadway debut starring in the 1989-91 Tony Award winning revival of Gypsy with Tyne Daly. She played the role of Louise/Gypsy, for which she was nominated in 1990 for her first Tony Award for Best Performance by a Featured Actress in a Musical. She was also nominated for a Drama Desk Award and Outer Critics Circle Award for her performance. The New York Times critic Frank Rich said of her performance, "It's the title character, not Rose, that Gypsy asks the audience to root for, and the lovely Ms. Moore, who steadily blossoms from a forgotten child to a self-possessed star, makes it easy to do so." John Simon of New York Magazine said, "Crista Moore runs the gamut from self-abnegating duckling to dazzling swan with seamless perfection. She is the first performer to justify the show’s title being not Rose but Gypsy.”

She next starred as Polly in the First National Tour of Crazy for You opposite James Brennan, succeeding Karen Ziemba. The production was directed by Mike Ockrent and choreographed by Susan Stroman.

Moore next appeared on Broadway in 1996 in the musical Big (based on the 1988 film) in which she created the role of Susan Lawrence (played in the film by Elizabeth Perkins). For this performance, Moore was nominated for her second Tony Award, this time for Best Performance by a Leading Actress in a Musical. She was also nominated for a Drama Desk Award for Best Leading Actress in a Musical. Big played for 193 performances.

Her next Broadway appearance came in 2000 with the Broadway debut of the Noël Coward play Waiting in the Wings. Moore played the supporting role of Zelda Fenwick in a cast that included Lauren Bacall, Rosemary Harris and Helen Stenborg. The play ran for 186 performances. In 2004, Moore performed in a Broadway revival of the Tom Stoppard play Jumpers that ran for 89 performances. In 2005 she was a part of the ensemble cast of Manhattan Theatre Club's Broadway revival of Absurd Person Singular.

Moore has starred in musicals for New York City Opera including the title role in Rodgers and Hammerstein’s Cinderella, which marked the New York stage premiere of the production and led Moore to a featured television appearance, singing a duet live on NBC’s Macy’s Thanksgiving Day Parade. She also appeared in New York City Opera productions as Eileen in Wonderful Town and Snookie in 110 in the Shade, the latter choreographed by Susan Stroman and directed by Scott Ellis. She was asked to reprise the role of Cinderella for Cleveland Opera's production the following year.

Moore's Off-Broadway credits include the 2001 production of Tartuffe at the Tribeca Playhouse (Elmire), Stars in Your Eyes at the Cherry Lane Theatre in 1999, David Ives' Long Ago and Far Away for Ensemble Studio Theatre in 1992 (in which she created the role of Laura), the revival of "Rags" at the American Jewish Theatre (Bella) and Birds of Paradise at the Promenade Theatre in 1987 with JK Simmons, Donna Murphy and Mary Beth Peil.

In the Salzburg Marionette Theatre’s 2007 world premiere production of The Sound Of Music, Moore, along with Christiane Noll & Jonathan Groff, lends her voice as Baroness Elsa Shraeder to this critically acclaimed North American and European tour performed to a fully orchestrated recording with the Istropolis Philharmonic Orchestra, presented entirely with marionettes.

Moore originated the role of Alice Beineke on the First National Tour of The Addams Family that was created on Broadway by Carolee Carmello.

In the World Premiere of the 2015 New York Spring Spectacular at Radio City Music Hall, she created the role of Isabella.

Recently, Moore guest starred in Off-Broadway's Nassim at New York City Center.

== Stage ==
Year	Title	Role	Venue	Ref.
1987	Birds of Paradise	Julia	Off-Broadway, Promenade Theatre	
1987	The Phantom of the Opera	Jammes	Regional, Repertory Theatre of St. Louis	
1988	The Phantom of the Opera	Jammes	Regional, Theatre In The Square San Francisco	
1989	Gypsy	Louise	Broadway, St. James Theatre	
1989	Gypsy	Louise	U.S. National Tour	
1991	Rags	Bella	Off-Broadway, American Jewish Theatre	
1992	110 in the Shade	Snookie Updegraff	Off-Broadway, New York City Opera	
1993	Long Ago and Far Away	Laura	Off-Broadway, Ensemble Studio Theatre	
1993	Harvey	Nurse Kelly	Regional Cincinnati Playhouse in the Park	
1993	Rodgers and Hammerstein's Cinderella	Cinderella	Off-Broadway, New York City Opera	
1994	Rodgers and Hammerstein's Cinderella	Cinderella	Broadway, Palace Theatre	
1994	Wonderful Town	Eileen Sherwood	Off-Broadway, New York City Opera	
1994	Crazy for You	Polly Baker	U.S. National Tour	
1996	Big	Susan	Broadway, Shubert Theatre	
1999	Waiting in the Wings	Zelda Fenick	Broadway, Walter Kerr Theatre	
1999	My Fair Lady	Eliza Doolittle	Regional, Geva Theatre Center	
1999	Stars in Your Eyes	Leigh Hunt-Smith	Off-Broadway, Cherry Lane Theatre	
2000	The Guardsman	The Actress	Regional, Cleveland Play House	
2002	Tartuffe	Elmire	Off-Broadway, Tribeca Playhouse	
2002	Annie	Grace	Regional, Paper Mill Playhouse	
2003	My Fair Lady	Eliza Doolittle	Regional, Repertory Theatre of St. Louis	
2003	My Fair Lady	Eliza Doolittle	Regional, Cincinnati Playhouse in the Park	
2003	Annie	Grace	Regional, Theatre Under The Stars Atlanta	
2004	Jumpers	Dotty (standby)	Broadway, Brooks Atkinson Theatre	
2004	Guys and Dolls	Sarah Brown	Regional, Long Wharf Theatre	
2005	Absurd Person Singular	Jane, Eva (understudy)	Broadway, Biltmore Theatre	
2005	House and Garden	Lucille	Regional, Cleveland Play House	
2005	A Chorus Line	Cassie	Regional, Geva Theatre Center	
2006	1776	Martha Jefferson	Regional, Geva Theatre Center	
2007	Zorba	The Widow	Off-Broadway, York Theatre Company	
2007	Under Midwestern Stars	Lena	Regional, Spencer Theatre	
2007	The Sound of Music	Baroness Elsa Shraeder	Regional, Salzburg Marionette Theatre	
2008	The Sound of Music	Maria Rainer	Regional, Sacramento Music Circus	
2010	The Sound of Music	Baroness Elsa Schrader	Regional, Ogunquit Playhouse	
2011	The Addams Family	Alice Beineke'	U.S. National Tour	

== Film and television ==
Featured roles in film and television include independent filmmaker Todd Solondz's film Storytelling (which played the 2001 Cannes Film Festival), Law and Order: SVU, All My Children and Days of Our Lives as well as appearances on CNN and Entertainment Tonight.

== Recordings ==
Moore’s musical recordings include the original cast recordings of Gypsy (1989), Big (1996) and Birds of Paradise (1987) as well as vocal performances on Varèse Sarabande Labels' Unsung Sondheim, Unsung Irving Berlin, Unsung Musicals, Lost in Boston IV, Peter Pan, Cinderella, Primetime Musicals and Shakespeare on Broadway.

== Awards and nominations ==
Year	Award	Category	Nominated Work	Result
1990	Theatre World Award	Best Broadway Debut	Gypsy	Won
1990	Tony Award	Best Performance by a Featured Actress in a Musical	Gypsy	Nominated
1990	Drama Desk Award	Outstanding Featured Actress in a Musical	Gypsy	Nominated
1990	Outer Critics Circle Award	Outstanding Featured Actress in a Musical	Gypsy	Nominated
1996	Tony Award	Best Performance by a Leading Actress in a Musical	Big	Nominated
1996	Drama Desk Award	Outstanding Actress in a Musical	Big	Nominated
1996	Outer Critics Circle Award	Outstanding Actress in a Musical	Big	Nominated
