= John Weidman =

American musical and TV writer

- Born: September 25, 1946 (age 80); New York City, U.S.
- Education: Harvard University (BA); Yale Law School (JD)
- Occupation: Writer
- Notable credits: Pacific Overtures; Assassins; Contact
- Television: Sesame Street
- Relatives: Jerome Weidman (father)

John Weidman (born September 25, 1946) is an American librettist and television writer for Sesame Street. He has worked on stage musicals with Stephen Sondheim and Susan Stroman.

== Career ==
Weidman was born in New York City and grew up in Westport, Connecticut, the son of Peggy Wright and librettist and novelist Jerome Weidman. He received a B.A. from Harvard University with a major in East Asian history and a J.D. from Yale Law School.

=== Theatre ===
Weidman collaborated on three stage musicals with Stephen Sondheim, all of which are politically themed to some degree. The first was Pacific Overtures, about the Westernization of Japan in the 19th century; it premiered on Broadway in 1976 and was revived in 2004 at Studio 54. Assassins, a musical about the men and women who attempted (with or without success) to murder the President of the United States, first opened Off-Broadway in December 1990 at Playwrights Horizons, and later opened in the West End in October 1992 at the Donmar Warehouse. The musical was revived on Broadway in 2004 in a Roundabout Theater Company production. Road Show, a musical based on the lives of Wilson and Addison Mizner, opened Off-Broadway at the Public Theatre in 2008. The musical had productions at the Goodman Theatre and Kennedy Center in 2003 prior to the Off-Broadway production.

Weidman has worked with choreographer/director Susan Stroman three times. He wrote the book for the musical Big, the Musical, with Stroman as choreographer. The musical opened on Broadway in April 1996 at the Shubert Theatre. He and Stroman co-created the Tony Award-winning musical Contact, which opened Off-Broadway in October 1999 at the Newhouse Theatre at Lincoln Center and on Broadway at the Vivian Beaumont Theatre in March 2000. He wrote the book for the new musical Happiness, which ran at Lincoln Center in February 2009. Directed and choreographed by Stroman, the composer was Scott Frankel with lyrics by Michael Korie.

He has been nominated for the Tony Award for Best Book for a Musical three times and has been inducted into The Theater Hall of Fame.

== Other work ==
In the 1970s, Weidman wrote for National Lampoon. Weidman has also written for Sesame Street, for which he and the writing team have won the Daytime Emmy Award for Outstanding Writing For A Children's Series more than a dozen times.

From 1999 to 2009 he was president of the Dramatists Guild of America.

== Stage work (libretti) ==
- Pacific Overtures - 1976 (Tony Award nominee, Best Book of a Musical)
- Anything Goes - 1987 (revised original book with Timothy Crouse; Tony Award, Best Musical Revival)
- Assassins - 1990 (revived on Broadway in 2004) (Drama Desk Award nominee, Outstanding Book of a Musical; Tony Award, Best Musical Revival)
- Big - 1996 (Tony Award nominee, Best Book of a Musical)
- Contact - 1999 - Off-Broadway; 2000 - Broadway (Tony Award nominee, Best Book of a Musical; Tony Award, Best Musical)
- Take Flight - 2007
- Road Show - 2008
- Happiness - 2009
- I Can Get It for You Wholesale - 2023 (revised the show's book, originally written by his father Jerome Weidman)

== Awards and nominations ==
Year	Award	Category	Work	Result	Ref.
1976	Tony Awards	Best Book of a Musical	Pacific Overtures	Nominated	
1976	Drama Desk Awards	Drama Desk Award for Outstanding Book of a Musical	Pacific Overtures	Nominated	
1988	Daytime Emmy Awards	Outstanding Writing for a Children's Series	Sesame Street	Won	
1989	Daytime Emmy Awards	Outstanding Writing for a Children's Series	Sesame Street	Won	
1990	Daytime Emmy Awards	Outstanding Writing for a Children's Series	Sesame Street	Won	
1991	Daytime Emmy Awards	Outstanding Writing for a Children's Series	Sesame Street	Won	
1991	Drama Desk Awards	Drama Desk Award for Outstanding Book of a Musical	Assassins	Nominated	
1992	Daytime Emmy Awards	Outstanding Writing for a Children's Series	Sesame Street	Won	
1993	Daytime Emmy Awards	Outstanding Writing for a Children's Series	Sesame Street	Nominated	
1994	Daytime Emmy Awards	Outstanding Writing for a Children's Series	Sesame Street	Won	
1995	Daytime Emmy Awards	Outstanding Writing for a Children's Series	Sesame Street	Won	
1996	Daytime Emmy Awards	Outstanding Writing for a Children's Series	Sesame Street	Nominated	
1996	Drama Desk Awards	Drama Desk Award for Outstanding Book of a Musical	Big	Nominated	
1996	Tony Awards	Best Book of a Musical	Big	Nominated	
1997	Daytime Emmy Awards	Outstanding Writing for a Children's Series	Sesame Street	Nominated	
1998	Daytime Emmy Awards	Outstanding Writing for a Children's Series	Sesame Street	Won	
1999	Daytime Emmy Awards	Outstanding Writing for a Children's Series	Sesame Street	Won	
2000	Daytime Emmy Awards	Outstanding Writing for a Children's Series	Sesame Street	Nominated	
2000	Tony Awards	Best Book of a Musical	Contact	Nominated	
2001	Daytime Emmy Awards	Outstanding Writing for a Children's Series	Sesame Street	Won	
2002	Daytime Emmy Awards	Outstanding Writing for a Children's Series	Sesame Street	Won	
2003	Daytime Emmy Awards	Outstanding Writing for a Children's Series	Sesame Street	Won	
2004	Daytime Emmy Awards	Outstanding Writing for a Children's Series	Sesame Street	Nominated	
2005	Daytime Emmy Awards	Outstanding Writing for a Children's Series	Sesame Street	Nominated	
2006	Daytime Emmy Awards	Outstanding Writing for a Children's Series	Sesame Street	Won	
2007	Daytime Emmy Awards	Outstanding Writing for a Children's Series	Sesame Street	Nominated	
2008	Daytime Emmy Awards	Outstanding Writing for a Children's Series	Sesame Street	Nominated	
2009	Daytime Emmy Awards	Outstanding Writing for a Children's Series	Sesame Street	Nominated	
2010	Daytime Emmy Awards	Outstanding Writing for a Children's Series	Sesame Street	Won	
2011	Daytime Emmy Awards	Outstanding Writing for a Children's Series	Sesame Street	Nominated	
2012	Daytime Emmy Awards	Outstanding Writing for a Children's Series	Sesame Street	Won	
2013	Daytime Emmy Awards	Outstanding Writing for a Children's Series	Sesame Street	Won	
2014	Daytime Emmy Awards	Outstanding Writing for a Children's Series	Sesame Street	Won	
2015	Daytime Emmy Awards	Outstanding Writing for a Children's Series	Sesame Street	Won	
2016	Daytime Emmy Awards	Outstanding Writing for a Children's Series	Sesame Street	Nominated	
2017	Daytime Emmy Awards	Outstanding Writing for a Children's Series	Sesame Street	Won	
