= Big (musical) =

- The Musical
- Original Cast Recording
- Music: David Shire
- Lyrics: Richard Maltby, Jr.
- Book: John Weidman
- Basis: 1988 film Big by Gary Ross and Anne Spielberg
- Productions: 1996 Broadway; 1998 US National Tour; 2016 UK and Ireland; 2019 West End

Big The Musical is a 1996 musical adaptation of the 1988 film starring Tom Hanks. It was directed by Mike Ockrent and featured music by David Shire and lyrics by Richard Maltby, Jr., with choreography by Susan Stroman. It involves Josh Baskin, a 12-year-old boy who grows up overnight after being granted a wish by a Zoltar Speaks machine at a carnival. With the aid of his best friend, Billy, he must cope with his new adulthood while finding the machine so that he can wish himself back and more.

== Background and productions ==
The pre-Broadway tryout started in Detroit in January 1996. The musical opened on Broadway at the Shubert Theatre on April 28, 1996, and closed on October 13, 1996, after 193 performances. Although it was nominated for five Tony Awards (Best Actress, Supporting Actor, Book, Score, and Choreography), it was one of Broadway's costliest money-losers.

The show had a US National tour, directed by Eric D. Schaeffer starring Jim Newman and Jacquelyn Piro Donovan, which began in September 1997 in Wilmington, Delaware. It was "restaged and largely rewritten for the road".

Reviews were sharply divided on the musical, but not on the 1998 US National tour, which was a hit after much rewriting from authors, John Weidman (book), Richard Maltby, Jr. (lyrics), and David Shire (music). Alvin Klein reviewed a 2000 regional production in The New York Times and wrote, "Big cannot be cavalierly dismissed as a failed musical that was no match for a blockbuster movie. It is satisfyingly good - and it was shortchanged." The revised version is available through Music Theatre International.

The show made its UK and Ireland premiere prior to the West End at the Theatre Royal Plymouth November 5-12, 2016, and at the Bord Gáis Energy Theatre in Dublin over the Christmas period from December 7, 2016 to January 7, 2017. Strictly Come Dancing winner and The Wanted vocalist Jay McGuiness stars as Josh. The production transferred to London's West End at the Dominion Theatre from September 6 to November 2, 2019 with McGuiness reprising the role of Josh.

== Synopsis ==
Act I

Josh Baskin, a 12-year-old New Jersey boy, finds that whenever he sees 13-year-old Cynthia Benson, he is unaccountably speechless. He doesn't understand his new feelings, but every family on the street knows what has occurred. For him, childhood has ended; adolescence has occurred, and the long complex process of growing up has begun. ("Overture/Can't Wait"). Then he receives amazing news from his best friend, Billy Kopecki: she thinks he is "cute." All he has to do is make a move tonight at the carnival ("Talk To Her/The Carnival."). But doing so does not turn out as planned. Meeting her in line for a ride called Wild Thunder, he musters enough courage to "talk to her", only to find that she has a date who is 16. Worse, he is too short to ride the ride. Humiliated, he skateboards away and finds himself in a secluded byway of the carnival with fun house mirrors and a mysterious fortune teller machine, Zoltar Speaks. The mysterious figure in it instructs him to "Make a Wish!" Impulsively, he makes the only one on his mind: "I wish I was big!" The machine produces a card: "Your wish is granted." A clap of thunder and sudden rain send him home.

The next morning, Josh wakes up and sees the face of a 30-year-old man in his mirror ("This Isn't Me"). Still a 12-year-old boy, he now inhabits the body of an adult. His mother thinks he is an intruder and drives him from the house. (In the touring and rentable versions, his song is replaced by her singing about motherhood while making breakfast ("Say Good Morning To Mom").) Only Billy understands. He decides they must go to New York City, find the machine, and let Josh wish himself back to his child life. Arcades there, however, don't have it, and locating carnivals will take six to eight weeks (three to four weeks in rented versions). He despairs at the prospect of remaining an adult for that long, and worries that he will have to find a job. In the touring and rented versions, Billy tries to calm him, telling him that he'll be fine, because "You're A Big Boy Now". Billy returns to New Jersey, leaving him to spend his first night as an adult alone in the Port Authority Bus Terminal. (In the original version, he then wishes he could go home ("I Want To Go Home").)

The next day, while waiting for Billy under the clocktower at FAO Schwarz ("The Time Of Your Life") Josh meets MacMillan, the head of a toy company whose sales have suddenly plummeted. He, 12-year-old that he is, tells MacMillan what his toys lack. What the latter sees, however, is a 30-year-old man with an amazing insight into toys, children, and (when they discover a piano keyboard they can dance on) having fun ("Fun"). He offers Josh a great job. He enters the adult world of business. His innocence causes chaos. MacMillan cancels the company's Christmas toy, which his employees say "can't miss." The executives panic. Paul Seymour, V.P. in charge of product development, wants revenge for the cancellation ("Josh's Welcome"). Susan Lawrence, V.P in charge of marketing, whose affair with Paul is just ending, finds herself attracted to Josh ("Here We Go Again"). (In the touring and rental versions of the show, this scene opens with the executives singing about the toy business ("Welcome To MacMillan Toys"). Paul and Susan's songs have also been rewritten ("MacMillan Toys 2"), and she has an additional song regarding a wedding-obsessed secretary ("My Secretary's In Love").)

As a perk of his job, Josh is given a loft apartment. He furnishes it with toys. Susan arrives to make a pass at him (in the tour version, "Let's Not Move Too Fast"). Misreading her intentions, he innocently tries to find something they can do together ("Do You Want To Play Games"), and finally turns on a toy planetarium that fills the room with stars ("Stars, Stars, Stars"). Beguiled, she finds herself spending the night there—angelically in separate bunks. (In the tour version, she reminisces about her first love after he has fallen asleep ("Little Susan Lawrence").) At a company party, Paul learns of Susan's night with Josh and picks a fight with him. She comforts him and once again, his innocence wins her heart. MacMillan challenges his executives to come up with a new Christmas toy, and demands for them to find a way to relate to their children. Josh suggests dancing ("Cross The Line"). He gets everyone to do a line dance, during which Susan gives him a kiss unlike any he had ever received as a boy from his mother. When Billy arrives with the list of carnivals which has finally arrived, he chooses to go off with her. The adult world is beginning to attract him.

Act II

In a suburban mall, Billy, angry at being jilted by Josh, seeks the company of other kids ("It's Time"). He meets Josh's mother: today is his birthday and the party would have been at the mall. Billy reassures her that he is coming home, which only makes her more aware of how fast Billy and all the children have grown up ("Stop Time"). The mall turns surreal and becomes the scene of the birthday Josh is missing ("The Night-Mare"). He wakes up in Susan's office. They have been up all night trying, unsuccessfully, to invent a toy. They try thinking as children instead of adults—she can't remember how she felt as a 13-year-old, but under his prodding the memory returns ("Dancing All The Time"). The moment fills with emotion and she moves to him. The scene freezes. Young Josh appears to sing a duet with Big Josh about his inner feelings. ("I Want To Know").

The next morning, Josh barrels into the office as a new man ("Coffee Black"). His secretary, Miss Watson, is bowled over. Not only does he feel like an actual adult, but during the night, he thought up a Christmas toy. The executives help him develop it for MacMillan. Billy returns with the list of carnivals, having located the machine. Josh is, however, full of himself and does not want to return to his former self. Billy accuses him of betraying himself, but at that moment Susan appears and kisses him. Billy finally understands why he has been dismissed, and leaves. Susan invites Josh to a dinner party with her friends, and he excitedly exclaims that he is going to a real "grown-up dinner party with Susan's grown-up friends".

The party is a disaster ("The Real Thing"). Josh humiliates himself and realizes how far he is from being an adult. Susan takes this moment to tell him her true feelings for him ("One Special Man"), feelings that he is too young to return. (In the tour and rental versions, this is replaced by a reprise of "The Real Thing.") He tells her the truth: that he is really a 13-year-old boy. She, seeing only a grown man, assumes this is some kind of elaborate brush-off. It breaks her heart to have been wrong about another man. For the first time, he understands that being an adult is more than just being big. It is being responsible – in this case, for someone who you care for and who does so in return. He realizes that everything you say and do carries a certain weight that a kid can't imagine when you're an adult ("When You're Big"). He returns to his neighborhood, and watches boys go through the first nervous motions of pairing-off events appropriate to being 13 ("Skateboard Ballet"). He finds Billy and tells him he wants to go home.

Billy has found the machine in a warehouse filled with discarded remnants of amusement parks. Josh asks Susan to meet him there. Before he can make his wish and leave the adult world for the time being, he must say goodbye to make sure she understands. Arriving, she finally accepts the magic of what has happened to him. She tells him how he changed her life ("I Want To Go Home/Stars, Stars, Stars (reprise)") and, understanding that it's the only way, tells him to make his wish. As he does, his mother enters with Billy. Josh returns to his former self, and as he and his mother embrace, the curtain closes with Billy examining the machine. (In the touring and rental versions, the finale number is "We're Gonna Be Fine")

== Musical numbers ==
=== Broadway version ===
Act I

- "Opening"
- "Prologue" — Young Josh, Mrs. Baskin, Billy, Kids and Parents
- "Talk to Her" — Billy and Young Josh
- "This Isn't Me" — Josh Baskin
- "I Want to Go Home" — Josh Baskin
- "The Time of Your Life" — Kids
- "Fun" — MacMillan, Josh Baskin and The Company
- "Dr. Deathstar" — The Deathstarettes
- "Josh's Welcome" — Susan, Paul and Executives
- "Here We Go Again" — Susan
- "Stars, Stars, Stars" — Josh Baskin and Susan
- "Tavern Foxtrot" — Paul and The Company
- "Cross the Line" — Josh Baskin, Kids and The Company

Act II

- "It's Time" — Billy and Kids
- "Stop, Time" — Mrs. Baskin
- "Happy Birthday" — Josh, Kids
- "Dancing All the Time" — Susan
- "I Want to Know" — Young Josh
- "Coffee, Black" — Josh Baskin, MacMillan, Miss Watson, Birnbaum, Barrett, Lipton, Executives and Staff
- "The Real Thing" — Nick, Tom, Diane and Abigail
- "One Special Man" — Susan
- "When You're Big" — Josh Baskin
- "Skateboard Romance" — Kids
- "I Want to Go Home/Stars, Stars, Stars" — Josh Baskin and Susan

Note; There is also another recording not released to the public, only available with a licensee to the show, that contains all the songs in the script. Many songs on the original recording did not make the final show but are on the CD, as well many songs from the show after the Detroit tryout were also not put on the CD.

The musical is scored for keyboards, bass, guitar, drums, percussion, five woodwind players, trumpets, horns, trombones and a string quartet.

== Roles and cast ==
Character	Original Broadway cast (1996)	National Tour (1997)	Original UK and Ireland cast (2016)	Original London cast (2019)
Josh Baskin	Daniel Jenkins	Jim Newman	Jay McGuiness	Jay McGuiness
Susan	Crista Moore	Jacquelyn Piro Donovan	Diana Vickers	Kimberley Walsh
Billy	Brett Tabisel	Brett Tabisel	Charlie Barnard, Keir Edkins-O'Brien, Cameron Tweed	Jobe Hart, Theo Wilkinson, Austen Phelan
Cynthia Benson	Lizzy Mack	Demaree Alexander	Christie-Lee Crosson	Christie-Lee Crosson
Mrs. Baskin	Barbara Walsh	Judy McLane	Jessica Martin	Wendi Peters
Mr. Baskin	John Sloman	Dale Hensley	Andy Barke	Stuart Hickey
Young Josh Baskin	Patrick Levis	Joseph Medeiros	Max Robson, Jacob Smith, Ryan Trevatt	Harrison Dadswell, Jamie O'Connor, Jake Simon, Felix Warren
MacMillan	Jon Cypher	Ron Holgate	Gary Wilmot	Matthew Kelly
Paul	Gene Weygandt	Nick Cokas	Irwin Sparkes	Edward Handoll

== Awards and nominations ==
=== Original Broadway production ===
Year	Award ceremony	Category	Nominee	Result
1996	Tony Award	Best Book of a Musical	John Weidman	Nominated
1996	Tony Award	Best Original Score	Richard Maltby, Jr. and David Shire	Nominated
1996	Tony Award	Best Performance by a Leading Actress in a Musical	Crista Moore	Nominated
1996	Tony Award	Best Performance by a Featured Actor in a Musical	Brett Tabisel	Nominated
1996	Tony Award	Best Choreography	Susan Stroman	Nominated
1996	Drama Desk Award	Outstanding Musical		Nominated
1996	Drama Desk Award	Outstanding Book of a Musical	John Weidman	Nominated
1996	Drama Desk Award	Outstanding Actor in a Musical	Daniel Jenkins	Nominated
1996	Drama Desk Award	Outstanding Actress in a Musical	Crista Moore	Nominated
1996	Drama Desk Award	Outstanding Featured Actor in a Musical	Brett Tabisel	Nominated
1996	Drama Desk Award	Outstanding Music	David Shire	Nominated
1996	Drama Desk Award	Outstanding Lyrics	Richard Maltby, Jr.	Nominated
1996	Outer Critics Circle Award	Outstanding New Broadway Musical		Nominated
1996	Theatre World Award		Brett Tabisel	Won
