= Swinging on a Star (musical) =

- Music: Johnny Burke; Various Artists
- Lyrics: Johnny Burke
- Book: Michael Leeds
- Productions: 1995 Broadway

Swinging on a Star is a musical revue, featuring the music of Johnny Burke, with the lyrics by Burke and the music by Burke and several of his partners, such as Erroll Garner and Jimmy Van Heusen. The name of the revue is from the Oscar-winning song that Burke wrote with Jimmy Van Heusen for the 1944 film Going My Way.

== Productions ==
Swinging on a Star premiered at the George Street Playhouse, New Brunswick, New Jersey, on April 16, 1994, running to May 1994. The revue was conceived, written and directed by Michael Leeds, with costumes by Judy Dearing, sets by Deborah Jasien and choreography by Kathleen Marshall. The cast featured Michael McGrath, Alton Fitzgerald White, Kathy Fitzgerald and Lewis Cleale.

The revue was next produced at the Goodspeed Opera House, Connecticut in 1995.

The show opened on Broadway at the Music Box Theatre on October 22, 1995 and closed on January 13, 1996 after 96 performances and 19 previews. Directed by Michael Leeds and choreographed by Kathleen Marshall, it featured Michael McGrath, Teresa Burrell, Lewis Cleale, Denise Faye, Eugene Fleming, Kathy Fitzgerald, and Alvaleta Guess.

== Synopsis and songs ==
Each segment showed a different time and place.

Act I
Speakeasy-Chicago (1920s)

- You're Not the Only Oyster in the Stew
- Chicago Style
- Ain't It a Shame About Mame
- What's New?
- Doctor Rhythm

Depression-The Bowery

- Pennies from Heaven
- When Stanislaus Got Married
- His Rocking Horse Ran Away
- Annie Doesn't Live Here Anymore

Radio Show- New York City (1940s)

- Annie Doesn't Live Here Anymore
- Scatterbrain
- One, Two, Button Your Shoe
- What Does It Take to Make You Take to Me?
- Irresistible
- An Apple for the Teacher

USO Show-The Pacific Islands

- Thank Your Lucky Stars and Stripes
- Personality
- There's Always the Blues
- Polka Dots and Moonbeams
- Swinging on a Star
- Stars and Stripes

Act II
Ballroom

- Don't Let That Moon Get Away
- All You Want to Do Is Dance
- You Danced with Dynamite
- Imagination
- It Could Happen to You

Road To...

- Road To Morocco
- Apalachicola, FLA
- You Don't Have to Know the Language
- Going My Way
- Shadows on the Swanee
- Pakistan
- Road to Morocco (Reprise)

Supper Club (1950s)

- But Beautiful
- Like Someone in Love
- Moonlight Becomes You
- If Love Ain't There (It Ain't There)
- Sunday, Monday, or Always
- Misty
- Here's That Rainy Day
- Pennies from Heaven (Reprise)
- Swinging on a Star (Reprise)

Sources
"Swinging on a Star: The Johnny Burke Musical" (1996), Johnny Burke, Joe Bushkin, Michael Leeds, pp. 4 and 7, ISBN 0822215233; Guide to Musical Theatre; IBDB.com

== Awards and nominations ==
=== Original Broadway production ===
Year	Award	Category	Nominee	Result
1996	Tony Award	Best Musical		Nominated
1996	Drama Desk Award	Outstanding Featured Actor in a Musical	Lewis Cleale	Nominated
1996	Drama Desk Award	Outstanding Featured Actor in a Musical	Michael McGrath	Nominated
1996	Drama Desk Award	Outstanding Featured Actress in a Musical	Kathy Fitzgerald	Nominated
1996	Drama Desk Award	Outstanding Choreography	Kathleen Marshall	Nominated
1996	Theatre World Award		Michael McGrath	Won
