= Ken Bichel =

American actor, composer, and musician

- Born: 1945 (age 80–81); Detroit, Michigan, US
- Occupations: Pianist, Composer, Singer/Songwriter
- Website: http://www.kenbichel.com

Ken Bichel (born 1945) is an American actor, composer, conductor, pianist, and synthesizer musician.

== Career ==
Bichel attended the Juilliard School where he graduated with a master's degree in piano performance in 1969. While at Juilliard he met Gershon Kingsley and Robert Moog, the inventor of the music synthesizer. He became a founding member of Kingsley's First Moog Quartet, a live performance synthesizer ensemble, and was recognized as the preeminent synthesizer authority in the New York recording industry from that time on.

Although Bichel is a classically trained pianist, he has spent most of his career playing and recording jazz, rock, and other forms of contemporary music on the piano and the synthesizer. Bichel became a member of the New York-based band Stories is the early 1970s with whom he recorded several hit songs on three different albums until the band broke up in 1973.

Bichel also played and/or conducted several Broadway shows. In 1975, he was hired as the musical director for the show Boccaccio. In 1977, Bichel took an onstage role (which also involved him playing the piano as well) as Norman in the original production of I Love My Wife. Bichel won the Drama Desk Award for Best Featured Actor in a Musical for his performance.

In 1978, he became the assistant conductor and pianist for the Broadway musical Working. During the 1970s, Bichel also worked as a freelance recording musician on synthesizer or piano for various artists and media projects. His work can be heard on over a dozen CDs including the self-titled and Soul Searching albums by Average White Band on the Rhino label (1974 and 1976), Judy Collins' Judith (1975) on the Elektra label, and Chaka Khan's Chaka Khan Chaka on the Ol' Skool Label (1978). He can be heard singing the backup "ahs" with Billy Joel on the mega-hit "Just the Way You Are". Additional recording and/or performance credits include Irene Cara, Plácido Domingo, Aretha Franklin, Peggy Lee, Cindy Bullens, Maureen McGovern, the Orchestra of the Sorbonne, Jane Olivor, Luciano Pavarotti, Carly Simon, Paul Simon, Stevie Wonder. In 1973 Bichel composed the music for the popular CBS game show Match Game.

Bichel is an internationally acclaimed concert artist and has performed at the La Scala opera house in Milan, the American Music Festival in Geneva, in London for the Duchess of Kent, in Hong Kong for its bi-centennial, in Munich with the Bavarian Radio Orchestra and repeatedly at Carnegie Hall and Lincoln Center in New York City.

TV appearances include The Tonight Show, David Letterman Late Show, the Dick Cavett show, Saturday Night Live, American Bandstand, Regis Philbin, Rosie O'Donnell, etc. Bichel has also appeared as a featured musician in films like Kinsey, Marvin's Room, and A Family Thing, and made a cameo appearance on film in Woody Allen's Broadway Danny Rose. Bichel has also won an Emmy Award for his music composition work on television.

== Personal life ==
Today, Bichel lives with his wife in San Miguel de Allende, Mexico, where he continues to compose both for his own international solo performances and for other contemporary classical performance ensembles. In 2009 he and his wife, both long-time meditators, became certified teaching monks of Ascension of the Bright Path Ishayas.

== Discography ==
With Arif Mardin

- Journey (Atlantic, 1974)
