= Brett Tabisel =

American actor (born 1982)

- Born: September 14, 1982 (age 42); United States
- Occupation: Actor
- Years active: 1997–present

Brett Tabisel (born September 14, 1982) is an American actor. He performed in Big: the musical in 1996 and appeared in the films Strong Island Boys, Returning Mickey Stern, Dirty Deeds, and Frat Brothers of the KVL. He has made guest appearances in the television series Law & Order: Special Victims Unit, Chappelle's Show, Ed, and the web series Red Oaks. He also has provided voices in video games by Rockstar Games such as Bully and Grand Theft Auto V.

== Filmography ==
=== Film ===
Year	Title	Role	Notes
1997	Strong Island Boys	Jeremy	
2002	Returning Mickey Stern	Young Harry	
2005	Dirty Deeds	Stick	
2007	Frat Brothers of the KVL	Frankie 'Chunk' Gladwin	

=== Television ===
Year	Title	Role	Notes
2002	Law & Order: SVU	Brian	Episode: "Deception"
2003	Chappelle's Show	Kid with Travel Stenographer	Episode: "Popcopy & Clayton Bigsby"
2004	Ed	Producer / J.T.	2 episodes
2015	Red Oaks	Waiter	Episode: "The Bar Mitzvah"

=== Video games ===
Year	Title	Role
2006	Bully	Algie
2013	Grand Theft Auto V	The Local Population
