= Joseph Saulter =

American musician and former video game designer

Joseph Saulter is an American musician, actor and video game designer. He is the co-founder of The Urban Video Game Academy and is currently the president of the DeKalb Council of the Arts, chairman of the Diversity Advisory Board at the International Game Developers Association and a full-time faculty member at the Art Institute of Atlanta in the field of audio production. Saulter is also the CEO of Entertainment Arts Research which is the first African American-owned 3D video-game development company in the United States. Saulter is probably best known for his work as a Broadway actor and musician. His Broadway credits include Hair, Jesus Christ Superstar and I Love My Wife for which Saulter won a Drama Desk Award. Saulter also wrote the Drum book for Doug Henning's Broadway hit The Magic Show." Saulter is a professional jazz drummer and still performs today. When was he born? Saulter was featured in the October 2006 issue of Ebony magazine as "Who's Who in the Technology Boom". He is also the author of the book Introduction to Game Design and Development published by McGraw-Hill.
