= John Miller (musician) =

American musician, born 1945

John Miller (born 1945) is an American bassist and musical coordinator known for his work on Broadway. He graduated from the University of Michigan with a Bachelor of Music degree in 1968.

A professional bass player, he moved to New York City in the mid-1970s and was eventually hired as the musical director for the Broadway musical I Love My Wife. He also had an acting role in the show for which he won a Drama Desk Award. In the mid-'70s he played bass and arranged for Leonard Cohen, arranging his single “Do I Have to Dance All Night”.

Although Miller won an acting award, he has had very few acting roles since, instead choosing to work as a musical contractor and later musical coordinator on stage, and in films and television. As a musical coordinator, he not only finds and hires musicians, but also musical directors, orchestrators, and copyists for productions. He also provides the same service to film companies when they hire out of New York City.

Over the past 30 years, Miller has been the musical coordinator for more than 75 Broadway shows including Young Frankenstein, Les Misérables, Jersey Boys, Sweeney Todd, Caroline, or Change, Little Shop of Horrors, Big River, Thoroughly Modern Millie, The Producers, The Who's Tommy, Little Women and Barnum.

He has also worked as the musical coordinator for films, including The Producers, Mulan and Marvin's Room.

In 2008, he released a solo album, Stage Door Johnny: John Miller Takes On Broadway on the P.S. Classics label. It showcases Miller's vocals, guitar, and bass playing on a wide range of material from the Broadway catalog, with unique arrangements and an all-star cast of musicians.

In 2014, Miller had a recurring acting role as the drug-dealing tympanist Dee Dee in the Amazon Original comedy series Mozart in the Jungle.
