= Jayne Houdyshell =

American actress (born 1953)

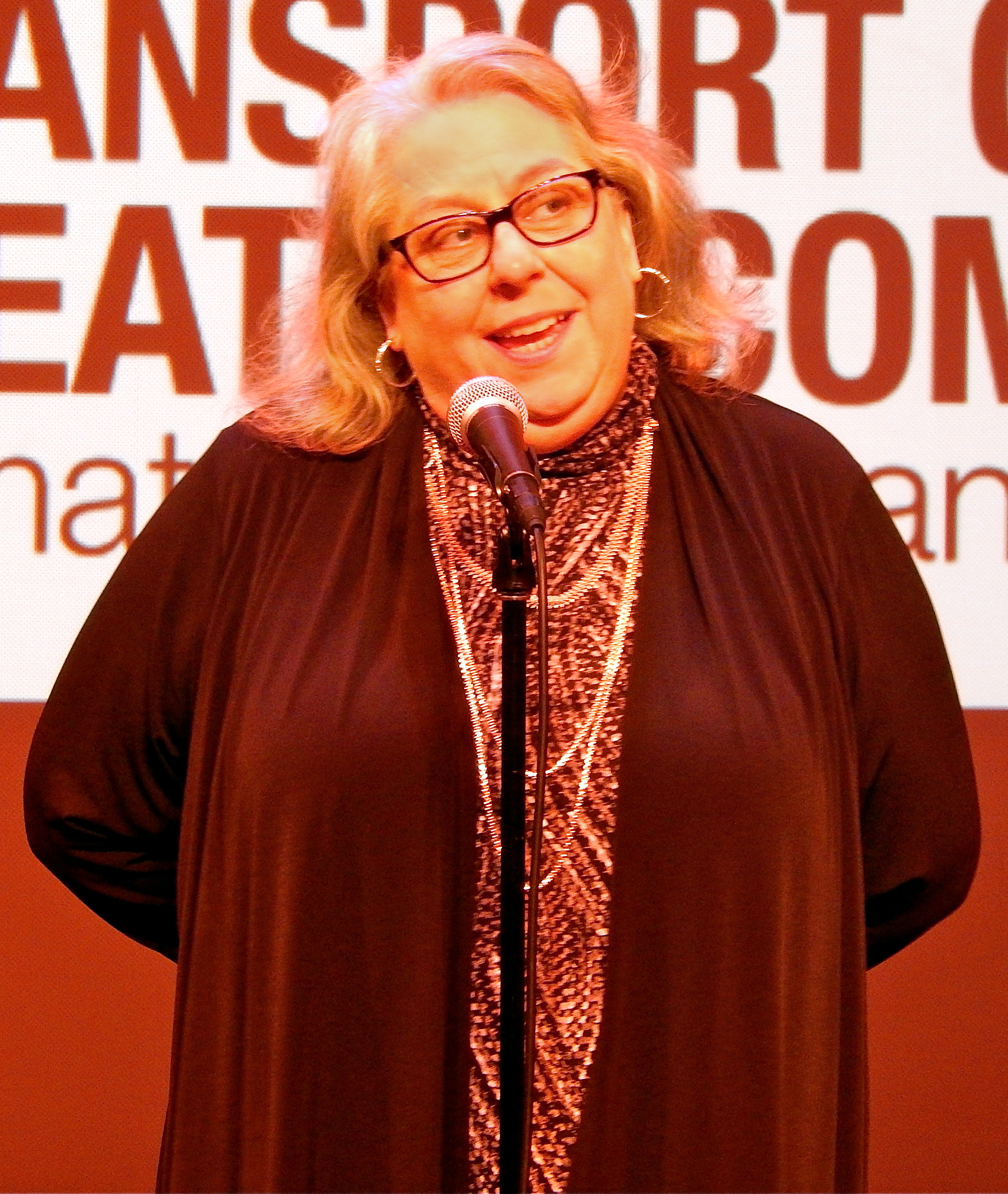
- Houdyshell at a 2013 Gala
- Born: Jayne Houdyshell; September 25, 1953 (age 73); Topeka, Kansas, U.S.
- Education: Academy of Dramatic Art at Oakland University
- Occupation: Actor
- Years active: 1973–present
- Works: Full list
- Awards: Full list

Jayne Houdyshell /ˈhaʊdiˌʃɛl/ (born September 25, 1953) is an American actress. Known for being a prolific character actor in theatre, film, and television, Houdyshell has received numerous accolades, including a Tony Award, two Obie Awards, and a Drama Desk Award.

She made her Broadway debut in the musical A Wonderful Life (2005). She went on to receive the Tony Award for Best Featured Actress in a Play for The Humans (2016). She was Tony-nominated for her roles in the Lisa Kron play Well (2006), the revival of Stephen Sondheim's musical Follies (2012), the new play by Lucas Hnath A Doll's House, Part 2 (2017), and the revival of Meredith Willson's The Music Man (2022).

She is also known for her supporting film roles in Alexander Payne's science fiction comedy Downsizing (2017) and Greta Gerwig's period piece Little Women, and for reprising her role in the 2021 film adaptation of The Humans. She has had recurring roles in various television series, including Third Watch, Law & Order, Blue Bloods, and The Good Fight. She starred as "Bunny Folger" on the hit Hulu comedy series Only Murders in the Building, for which she was nominated for the Screen Actors Guild Award for Outstanding Ensemble in a Comedy Series.

== Early life and education ==
Raised in Topeka, Kansas, she is the youngest of four daughters born to Galen "Buzz" Houdyshell and Louella Taylor. She graduated from Topeka High School in 1971, and she went on to Emporia State University then on to graduate with honors from the Academy of Dramatic Art at Oakland University in Rochester, Michigan in 1974.

== Career ==
=== 1973–2004: Early roles ===
Since the mid-1970s, she has appeared in more than 200 plays at regional theaters throughout the United States, including the Meadow Brook Theater, Attic Theater, Missouri Repertory Theater, Asolo Repertory Theatre, Alabama Shakespeare Festival, Yale Repertory Theater, McCarter Theater, Delaware Theater Company, Wilma Theater, Syracuse Stage, Studio Arena, GeVa Theater, Actors Theater of Louisville, Steppenwolf Theater, American Conservatory Theater, Timber Lake Playhouse, Old Creamery Theatre, Totem Pole Playhouse, Peterborough Players, and others.

Houdyshell reminisces that, after moving to Manhattan in 1980, “I was traveling all that 20 years...There was a community of actors who did that. We were itinerant actors who just continually moved around the country from theater to theater and job to job." She has appeared in numerous films, including Changing Lanes (2002) with Ben Affleck, Maid in Manhattan (2002) with Jennifer Lopez, and Garden State (2004) with Zach Braff and Natalie Portman.

=== 2005–2014: Broadway debut and other roles ===
Houdyshell's television credits include appearances on Third Watch, Law & Order, Law & Order: Special Victims Unit, Law & Order: Criminal Intent, Blue Bloods, and The Good Fight, and as Bunny Folger on Only Murders in the Building. During this time she acted in Trust the Man (2006) with Julianne Moore, and Everybody's Fine (2009) with Robert De Niro, Kate Beckinsale, Drew Barrymore, and Sam Rockwell. She also had a role in the 2010 film The Bounty Hunter with Jennifer Aniston and Gerard Butler

In New York, she is known for her role as "Ann Kron" in the Broadway production of Well by Lisa Kron. It was a role that garnered her a Tony Award nomination in 2006. She won a Theater World Award and an Obie Award, Outstanding Performance, for the Off-Broadway production of Well, which ran in 2004 at the Public Theater.

She received the 2005 Joseph Jefferson Award, Supporting Actress, Play for her performance in The Pain and the Itch for Steppenwolf Theatre Company and a 2005 Barrymore Award, Outstanding Supporting Actress in a Play for her work in The Clean House at the Wilma Theater in Philadelphia.

Houdyshell's Broadway credits include Wicked, Well, Bye Bye Birdie, and The Importance of Being Earnest. In 2010, she starred as the Stage Manager in the film Morning Glory opposite Harrison Ford, Diane Keaton, and Rachel McAdams. She played the role of "Hattie" in the 2011 revival of Follies, and received a 2012 Tony Award nomination, Featured Actress in a Musical for her performance. Houdyshell played the Nurse in the 2013 Broadway revival of Romeo and Juliet.

=== 2015–2020: The Humans and acclaim ===
She appeared in The Humans as "Deirdre Blake", first in its Off-Broadway engagement at the Roundabout Theatre Company in September 2015 to December 2015, and then the Broadway production of the play which opened at the Helen Hayes Theatre on February 18, 2016. For The Humans she won the 2016 Tony Award, Featured Actress in a Play, the 2016 Drama Desk Award, Outstanding Ensemble Performance, and the Obie Award, Performance. She was also nominated for the 2016 Outer Critics Circle Award, Outstanding Actress in a Play.

In 2015, she starred as Rose Offer on the NBC limited series American Odyssey opposite Anna Friel and Peter Facinelli. In 2017, she appeared in Alexander Payne's science fiction comedy feature Downsizing opposite Matt Damon. In 2017 she played Ann Marie in Lucas Hnath's A Doll's House, Part 2.

Houdyshell's other New York credits include Harrison, TX: Three Plays by Horton Foote at Primary Stages, Coraline, The New Century, at the Mitzi E. Newhouse Theater at Lincoln Center (2008); The Receptionist at the Manhattan Theater Club (2007); Much Ado About Nothing (Delacorte Theatre, 2004); Fighting Words, and The Pain and the Itch at Playwrights Horizons (2009); Attempts on Her Life at Soho Rep; and True Love at the Zipper Theater (2001).

In 2018, she starred on the third season of the ABC thriller Quantico as The Widow. In 2019, she appeared as the housekeeper Hannah in Greta Gerwig's critically acclaimed and Oscar-nominated film adaptation of Little Women starring Saoirse Ronan, Emma Watson, Florence Pugh, Eliza Scanlen, Laura Dern, Timothée Chalamet, and Meryl Streep. In April 2019, Houdyshell returned to Broadway as the Earl of Gloucester in the Sam Gold directed production of King Lear, with Glenda Jackson in the title role.

=== 2021–present: Career expansion ===
In 2021, she reprised her Tony-winning role of Deidre Blake in The Humans, the film adaptation of her Broadway play. The movie co-starred Richard Jenkins, Amy Schumer, Beanie Feldstein, Steven Yeun, and June Squibb. It had its world premiere at the 2021 Toronto International Film Festival on September 12, 2021. The film was released by A24 on November 24, 2021, both in theaters and on Showtime. In 2021, 2022, and 2025, she played the memorable role of Bunny Folger on seasons 1, 2, and 5 of the hit, Emmy-nominated Hulu series Only Murders in the Building, opposite Steve Martin, Martin Short, and Selena Gomez. For her performance she received two nominations alongside the cast for the Screen Actors Guild Award for Outstanding Performance by an Ensemble in a Comedy Series.

In 2022 Houdyshell played Eulalie Mackecknie Shinn in musical revival of Meredith Willson's The Music Man, starring Hugh Jackman and Sutton Foster. For her performance she received a nomination for the Tony Award for Best Featured Actress in a Play. That same year she acted in the psychological drama film Causeway directed by Lila Neugebauer and starring Jennifer Lawrence and Brian Tyree Henry. It had its world premiere at the 2022 Toronto International Film Festival on September 10, 2022. It was released theatrically and on Apple TV+ on November 4, 2022. She returned to Broadway in the revival of Anton Chekov Uncle Vanya at Vivian Beaumont Theater starring Steve Carell, Allison Pill, William Jackson Harper, and Alfred Molina.

== Filmography ==
=== Film ===
| Year | Title | Role | Notes |
|---|---|---|---|
| 2002 | Changing Lanes | Miss Tetley | |
| 2002 | Maid in Manhattan | Carmen | |
| 2004 | Garden State | Mrs. Lubin | |
| 2005 | Trust the Man | Sex Addicts Leader | |
| 2005 | Road | Postal Clerk | |
| 2006 | Things That Hang from Trees | Pam Dupont | |
| 2006 | The Immaculate Conception | Sister Patricia | |
| 2009 | Everybody's Fine | Alice | |
| 2010 | The Bounty Hunter | Landlady | |
| 2010 | Morning Glory | Stage Manager | |
| 2014 | Romeo and Juliet | Nurse | |
| 2014 | Lucky Stiff | Harry's Landlady | |
| 2017 | Downsizing | Paul's Mother | |
| 2018 | The Chaperone | Sister Delores | |
| 2019 | Little Women | Hannah | |
| 2021 | The Humans | Deirdre Blake | |
| 2022 | Causeway | Sharon | |

=== Television ===
| Year | Title | Role | Notes |
|---|---|---|---|
| 1999 | Third Watch | Jane | Episode: "Welcome to Camelot" |
| 1997–2002 | Law & Order | Various Characters | 3 episodes |
| 2002–17 | Law & Order: Special Victims Unit | Judge Ruth Linden | 10 episodes |
| 2005 | Law & Order: Criminal Intent | Ruth Pear | Episode: "The Unblinking Eye" |
| 2006 | Conviction | Judge Roberta Palski | 2 episodes |
| 2009 | Loving Leah | Mrs. Finkelman | Television movie |
| 2009 | Guiding Light | Judge Burslem | Episode #1.15659 |
| 2010 | Running Wilde | Gertie Stellvertretter | Pilot |
| 2014 | Blue Bloods | Roseanne Galecki | Episode: "Open Secrets" |
| 2015 | Elementary | Carla | Episode: "Hemlock" |
| 2015 | American Odyssey | Rose Offer | 8 episodes |
| 2015 | Neon Joe, Werewolf Hunter | Jane Cotton | 2 episodes |
| 2017 | The Accidental Wolf | Rach | Episode: "Kathryn" |
| 2017–18 | The Good Fight | Renée Rampling | 2 episodes |
| 2018 | Quantico | The Widow | Episode: "The Conscience Code" |
| 2019 | The Tick | Black Market Bob | Episode: "Magic is Real" |
| 2020 | Evil | Judge Sara Carl Shire | Episode: "Justice x 2" |
| 2021–22, 2025 | Only Murders in the Building | Bunny Folger | Recurring |

=== Theatre ===
| Year | Title | Role | Notes |
|---|---|---|---|
| 2005 | A Wonderful Life | Mrs. Martini | Sam S. Shubert Theatre, Broadway |
| 2006 | Well | Ann | Longacre Theatre, Broadway |
| 2006–08 | Wicked | Madame Morrible (replacement) | Gershwin Theatre, Broadway |
| 2009–10 | Bye Bye Birdie | Mae Peterson | Henry Miller's Theatre, Broadway |
| 2010 | Wicked | Madame Morrible (replacement) | Emerald City Tour |
| 2011 | The Importance of Being Earnest | Miss Prism (replacement) | American Airlines Theatre, Broadway |
| 2011–12 | Follies | Hattie Walker | Marquis Theatre, Broadway; Ahmanson Theatre, Los Angeles |
| 2011 | 8 | Maggie Gallagher | Eugene O'Neill Theatre, Broadway |
| 2012–13 | Dead Accounts | Barbara | Music Box Theatre, Broadway |
| 2013 | Romeo and Juliet | Nurse | Richard Rodgers Theatre, Broadway |
| 2015 | Fish in the Dark | Gloria Drexel | Cort Theatre, Broadway |
| 2015–17 | The Humans | Deirdre Blake | Laura Pels Theatre; Helen Hayes Theatre; Gerald Schoenfeld Theatre |
| 2017 | A Doll's House, Part 2 | Anne Marie | John Golden Theatre, Broadway |
| 2018 | The Humans | Deirdre Blake | Ahmanson Theatre, Los Angeles; Hampstead Theatre, London |
| 2019 | King Lear | Earl of Gloucester | Cort Theatre, Broadway |
| 2022 | The Music Man | Mrs. Shinn | Winter Garden Theatre, Broadway |
| 2024 | Uncle Vanya | Mama Voinitski | Vivian Beaumont Theatre, Broadway |

== Awards and nominations ==
| Year | Award | Category | Nominated work | Result |
|---|---|---|---|---|
| 2004 | Drama Desk Award | Outstanding Featured Actress in a Play | Well | Nominated |
| 2004 | Obie Award | Distinguished Performance by an Actress | Well | Won |
| 2005 | Joseph Jefferson Award | Actress in a Supporting Role in a Play | The Pain and the Itch | Won |
| 2005 | Barrymore Award | Outstanding Supporting Actress in a Play | The Clean House | Won |
| 2006 | Tony Award | Best Featured Actress in a Play | Well | Nominated |
| 2006 | Theatre World Award | | Well | Won |
| 2012 | Tony Award | Best Featured Actress in a Musical | Follies | Nominated |
| 2012 | Outer Critics Circle Award | Outstanding Featured Actress in a Musical | Follies | Nominated |
| 2016 | Tony Award | Best Featured Actress in a Play | The Humans | Won |
| 2016 | Drama Desk Award | Outstanding Ensemble | The Humans | Won |
| 2016 | Drama League Award | Distinguished Performance | The Humans | Nominated |
| 2016 | Outer Critics Circle Award | Outstanding Actress in a Play | The Humans | Nominated |
| 2016 | Obie Award | Distinguished Performance by an Actress | The Humans | Won |
| 2016 | Lucille Lortel Award | Outstanding Lead Actress in a Play | The Humans | Nominated |
| 2017 | Tony Award | Best Featured Actress in a Play | A Doll's House, Part 2 | Nominated |
| 2017 | Drama Desk Award | Outstanding Featured Actress in a Play | A Doll's House, Part 2 | Nominated |
| 2017 | Outer Critics Circle Award | Outstanding Featured Actress in a Play | A Doll's House, Part 2 | Nominated |
| 2021 | Screen Actors Guild Award | Outstanding Performance by an Ensemble in a Comedy Series | Only Murders in the Building | Nominated |
| 2022 | Screen Actors Guild Award | Outstanding Performance by an Ensemble in a Comedy Series | Only Murders in the Building | Nominated |
| 2022 | Tony Award | Best Featured Actress in a Musical | The Music Man | Nominated |
