= List of awards and nominations received by Tyne Daly =

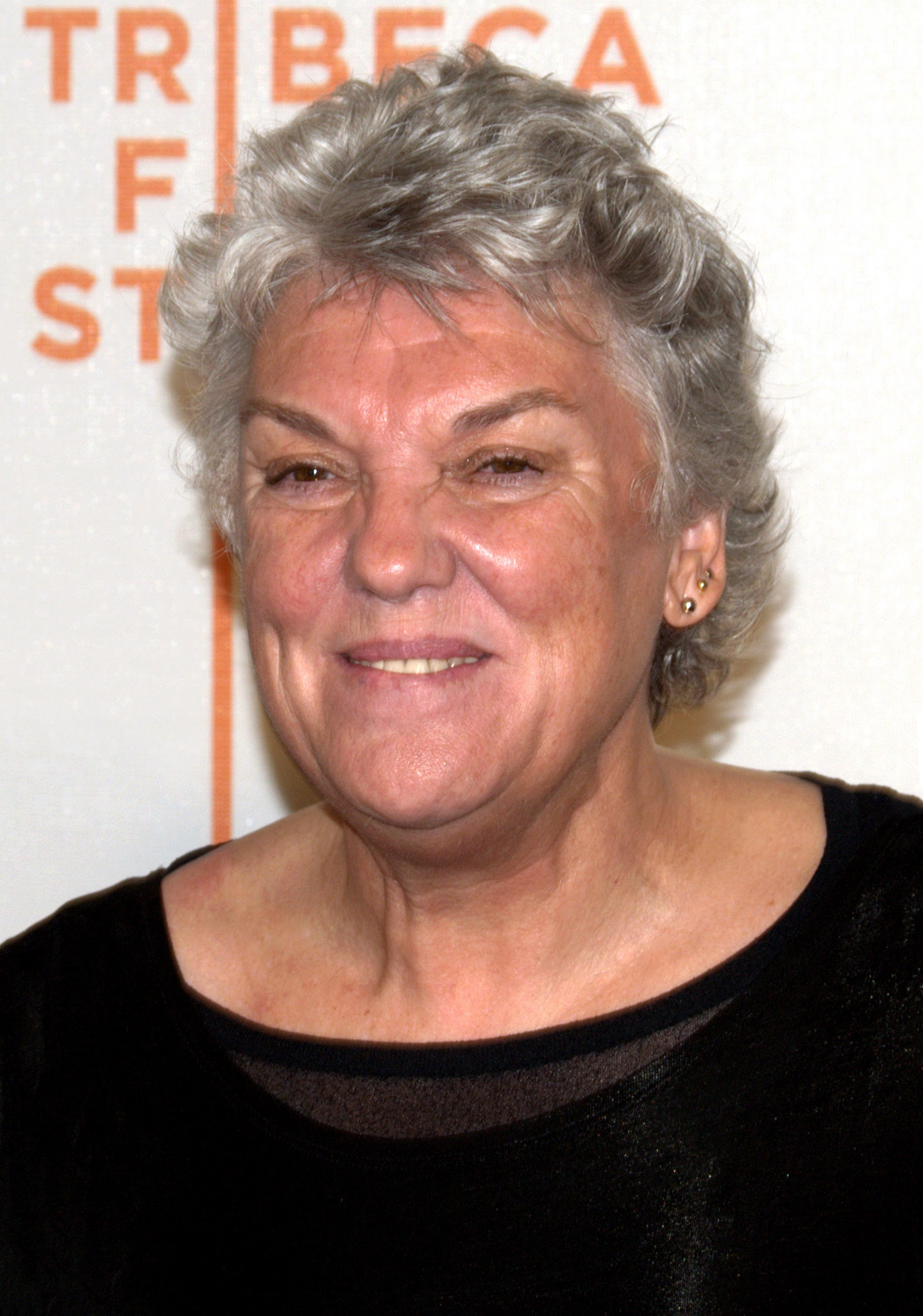
Daly at the Tribeca Film Festival in 2009

This article is a List of awards and nominations received by Tyne Daly.

Tyne Daly is an American actress known for her roles on the stage and screen.

She received numerous accolades including six Primetime Emmy Award wins for her roles on the CBS police drama Cagney & Lacey, the CBS period series Christy and the CBS legal drama Judging Amy. She also received nominations for five Golden Globe Awards and two Screen Actors Guild Awards.

Known also for her theatre work she received a Tony Award for Best Actress in a Musical for her Broadway role in Gypsy (1990). She was Tony-nominated for her roles in Rabbit Hole (2006), and Mothers and Sons (2014). She also received a Drama Desk Award and Outer Critics Circle Award as well as a nomination for a Drama League Award.

== Major associations ==
=== Emmy Awards ===
Primetime Emmy Awards
Year	Category	Nominated work	Result	Ref.
1978	Outstanding Supporting Actress in a Comedy or Drama Special	Intimate Strangers	Nominated	
1983	Outstanding Lead Actress in a Drama Series	Cagney & Lacey	Won	
1984	Outstanding Lead Actress in a Drama Series	Cagney & Lacey	Won	
1985	Outstanding Lead Actress in a Drama Series	Cagney & Lacey	Won	
1986	Outstanding Lead Actress in a Drama Series	Cagney & Lacey	Nominated	
1987	Outstanding Lead Actress in a Drama Series	Cagney & Lacey	Nominated	
1988	Outstanding Lead Actress in a Drama Series	Cagney & Lacey	Won	
1992	Outstanding Lead Actress in a Comedy Series	Wings	Nominated	
1995	Outstanding Supporting Actress in a Drama Series	Christy	Nominated	
1996	Outstanding Supporting Actress in a Drama Series	Christy	Won	
2000	Outstanding Supporting Actress in a Drama Series	Judging Amy	Nominated	
2001	Outstanding Supporting Actress in a Drama Series	Judging Amy	Nominated	
2002	Outstanding Supporting Actress in a Drama Series	Judging Amy	Nominated	
2003	Outstanding Supporting Actress in a Drama Series	Judging Amy	Won	
2004	Outstanding Supporting Actress in a Drama Series	Judging Amy	Nominated	
2005	Outstanding Supporting Actress in a Drama Series	Judging Amy	Nominated	

=== Golden Globe Awards ===
Year	Category	Nominated work	Result	Ref.
1983	Best Actress in a Drama Series	Cagney & Lacey	Nominated	
1984	Best Actress in a Drama Series	Cagney & Lacey	Nominated	
1985	Best Actress in a Drama Series	Cagney & Lacey	Nominated	
1986	Best Actress in a Drama Series	Cagney & Lacey	Nominated	
1994	Best Supporting Actress - Television	Christy	Nominated	

=== Screen Actors Guild Awards ===
Year	Category	Nominated work	Result	Ref.
2001	Outstanding Actress in a Drama Series	Judging Amy	Nominated	
2004	Outstanding Actress in a Drama Series	Judging Amy	Nominated	

=== Tony Awards ===
Year	Category	Nominated work	Result	Ref.
1990	Best Actress in a Musical	Gypsy	Won	
2006	Best Featured Actress in a Play	Rabbit Hole	Nominated	
2014	Best Actress in a Play	Mothers and Sons	Nominated	

== Theatre awards ==
=== Drama Desk Awards ===
Year	Category	Nominated work	Result	Ref.
1990	Outstanding Actress in a Musical	Gypsy	Won	
2014	Outstanding Actress in a Play	Mothers and Sons	Nominated	
2015	Outstanding Featured Actress in a Musical	It Shoulda Been You	Nominated	

=== Drama League Awards ===
Year	Category	Nominated work	Result	Ref.
2015	Outstanding Performance	It Shoulda Been You	Nominated	

=== Outer Critics Circle Awards ===
Year	Category	Nominated work	Result	Ref.
1990	Outstanding Actress in a Musical	Gypsy	Won	
1998	Outstanding Solo Performance	Mystery School	Nominated	
2012	Outstanding Actress in a Play	Master Class	Nominated	
2014	Outstanding Actress in a Play	Mothers and Sons	Nominated	
2015	Outstanding Featured Actress in a Musical	It Shoulda Been You	Nominated	

== Miscellaneous accolades ==
=== Independent Spirit Awards ===
- 2018 - Best Supporting Female - A Bread Factory, Part One - nominee

=== Satellite Awards ===
- 2001 - Best Actress in a Drama Series - Judging Amy - nominee

=== TV Guide Awards ===
- 2000 - Favorite Actress in a New Series - Judging Amy - winner
- 2001 - Best Actress in a Drama Series - Judging Amy - nominee

== Honorary awards ==
- 1995: Received a star on the Hollywood Walk of Fame
- 2002: Awarded the Women in Film Lucy Award in recognition of her excellence and innovation in her creative works that have enhanced the perception of women through the medium of television
- 2011: Inducted into the American Theatre Hall of Fame
- 2017: Awarded the Gingold Theatrical Group Golden Shamrock Award
