= New York Drama Critics' Circle =

American professional organization

New York Drama Critics' Circle logo and insignia

The New York Drama Critics' Circle is made up of 22 drama critics from daily newspapers, magazines and wire services based in the New York City metropolitan area. The organization is best known for its annual awards for excellence in theater.

The organization was founded in 1935 at the Algonquin Hotel by a group that included Brooks Atkinson, Walter Winchell, and Robert Benchley. Adam Feldman of Time Out New York has been President of the organization since 2005; Zachary Stewart of TheaterMania is currently Vice President and Treasurer.

== Member affiliations ==
- amNewYork
- The Daily Beast
- Deadline Hollywood
- The Hollywood Reporter
- Lighting & Sound America
- New York
- New York Daily News
- New York Post
- New York Observer
- The New Yorker
- New York Sun
- TheaterMania
- Time Out New York
- Variety
- Wall Street Journal
- TheWrap

=== The New York Times membership history ===
Although Brooks Atkinson of The New York Times was the first President of the NYDCC, Times critics are no longer permitted to be members of the group. In 1989, the newspaper's executive editor decreed that their critics could no longer participate in any awards voting. Times critics remained in the organization as non-voting members until 1997, when the newspaper reversed its policy and allowed its critics to resume voting for the awards. However, in 2003, the newspaper adopted a revised ethics policy that forbade its journalists from membership in an awards-voting body, and its critics withdrew from the NYDCC. As of 2026, the Times's policy against membership remains in effect.

== New York Drama Critics' Circle Awards ==
The New York Drama Critics' Circle meets twice a year. At the end of each theater season, it votes on the annual New York Drama Critics' Circle Awards, the second oldest playwriting award in the United States (after the Pulitzer Prize). The main award is for Best Play. Since 1945, the Circle has also given out awards for Best Musical; in 2025, it introduced new awards for Best Individual Performance and Best Ensemble Performance. Special Citations may also be awarded for actors, companies, or work of special merit. The award for Best Play includes a cash prize of $2,500. The awards are presented in a private ceremony.

The New York Drama Critics' Circle Award was conceived as an alternative to the Pulitzer Prize, and was initially limited to works by American playwrights. In 1938, the Circle began awarding a second prize, Best Foreign Play, to works of foreign origin. In the 1962–63 season, the Circle changed its rules so that the top winner, Best Play, could be of either American or foreign original, with the option for a secondary play award: If the winner of Best Play was of American origin, the Circle considered giving an award for Best Foreign Play as well; if the Best Play winner was of foreign origin, the Circle considered giving an award for Best American Play. No such secondary awards were given until 1970, after which they became more common. They were formally discontinued in 2025.

== Theater awards and citation winners ==
=== Best Play ===
A missing year in any section below indicates that the award was not given that year.

- 1936: Winterset – Maxwell Anderson
- 1937: High Tor – Maxwell Anderson
- 1938: Of Mice and Men – John Steinbeck
- 1940: The Time of Your Life – William Saroyan
- 1941: Watch on the Rhine – Lillian Hellman
- 1943: The Patriots – Sidney Kingsley
- 1945: The Glass Menagerie – Tennessee Williams
- 1947: All My Sons – Arthur Miller
- 1948: A Streetcar Named Desire – Tennessee Williams
- 1949: Death of a Salesman – Arthur Miller
- 1950: The Member of the Wedding – Carson McCullers
- 1951: Darkness at Noon – Sidney Kingsley
- 1952: I Am a Camera – John Van Druten
- 1953: Picnic – William Inge
- 1954: The Teahouse of the August Moon – John Patrick
- 1955: Cat on a Hot Tin Roof – Tennessee Williams
- 1956: The Diary of Anne Frank – Frances Goodrich and Albert Hackett
- 1957: Long Day's Journey into Night – Eugene O'Neill
- 1958: Look Homeward, Angel – Ketti Frings
- 1959: A Raisin in the Sun – Lorraine Hansberry
- 1960: Toys in the Attic – Lillian Hellman
- 1961: All the Way Home – Tad Mosel
- 1962: The Night of the Iguana – Tennessee Williams
- 1963: Who's Afraid of Virginia Woolf? – Edward Albee
- 1964: Luther – John Osborne
- 1965: The Subject Was Roses – Frank D. Gilroy
- 1966: Marat/Sade by Peter Weiss
- 1967: The Homecoming – Harold Pinter
- 1968: Rosencrantz and Guildenstern Are Dead – Tom Stoppard
- 1969: The Great White Hope – Howard Sackler
- 1970: Borstal Boy – Frank McMahon
- 1971: Home – David Storey
- 1972: That Championship Season – Jason Miller
- 1973: The Changing Room – David Storey
- 1974: The Contractors – David Storey
- 1975: Equus – Peter Shaffer
- 1976: Travesties – Tom Stoppard
- 1977: Otherwise Engaged – Simon Gray
- 1978: Da – Hugh Leonard
- 1979: The Elephant Man – Bernard Pomerance
- 1980: Talley's Folly – Lanford Wilson
- 1981: A Lesson from Aloes – Athol Fugard
- 1982: The Life and Adventures of Nicholas Nickleby (play) – David Edgar
- 1983: Brighton Beach Memoirs – Neil Simon
- 1984: The Real Thing – Tom Stoppard
- 1985: Ma Rainey's Black Bottom – August Wilson
- 1986: A Lie of the Mind – Sam Shepard
- 1987: Fences – August Wilson
- 1988: Joe Turner's Come and Gone – August Wilson
- 1989: The Heidi Chronicles – Wendy Wasserstein
- 1990: The Piano Lesson – August Wilson
- 1991: Six Degrees of Separation – John Guare
- 1992: Dancing at Lughnasa – Brian Friel
- 1993: Angels in America: Millennium Approaches – Tony Kushner
- 1994: Three Tall Women – Edward Albee
- 1995: Arcadia – Tom Stoppard
- 1996: Seven Guitars – August Wilson
- 1997: How I Learned to Drive – Paula Vogel
- 1998: Art – Yasmina Reza
- 1999: Wit – Margaret Edson
- 2000: Jitney – August Wilson
- 2001: The Invention of Love – Tom Stoppard
- 2002: The Goat, or Who Is Sylvia? – Edward Albee
- 2003: Take Me Out – Richard Greenberg
- 2004: Intimate Apparel – Lynn Nottage
- 2005: Doubt – John Patrick Shanley
- 2006: The History Boys – Alan Bennett
- 2007: The Coast of Utopia – Tom Stoppard
- 2008: August: Osage County – Tracy Letts
- 2009: Ruined – Lynn Nottage
- 2010: The Orphans' Home Cycle – Horton Foote
- 2011: Good People – David Lindsay-Abaire
- 2012: Sons of the Prophet – Stephen Karam
- 2013: Vanya and Sonia and Masha and Spike – Christopher Durang
- 2014: The Night Alive – Conor McPherson
- 2015: Between Riverside and Crazy – Stephen Adly Guirgis
- 2016: The Humans – Stephen Karam
- 2017: Oslo – J.T. Rogers
- 2018: Mary Jane – Amy Herzog
- 2019: The Ferryman – Jez Butterworth
- 2020: Heroes of the Fourth Turning – Will Arbery
- 2022: A Case for the Existence of God – Samuel D. Hunter
- 2023: Downstate – Bruce Norris
- 2024: Stereophonic – David Adjmi
- 2025: Purpose – Branden Jacobs-Jenkins
- 2026: Little Bear Ridge Road – Samuel D. Hunter

=== Best Musical ===
- 1946: Carousel – Richard Rodgers and Oscar Hammerstein II
- 1947: Brigadoon – Frederick Loewe and Alan Jay Lerner
- 1949: South Pacific – Richard Rodgers, Oscar Hammerstein II, and Joshua Logan
- 1950: The Consul – Gian Carlo Menotti
- 1951: Guys and Dolls – Frank Loesser, Abe Burrows and Jo Swerling,
- 1952: Pal Joey – Richard Rodgers, Lorenz Hart, and John O'Hara
- 1953: Wonderful Town – Joseph Fields, Jerome Chodorov, Betty Comden, Adolph Green, and Leonard Bernstein
- 1954: The Golden Apple (musical) – John La Touche and Jerome Moross
- 1955: The Saint of Bleecker Street – Gian Carlo Menotti
- 1956: My Fair Lady – Frederick Loewe and Alan Jay Lerner
- 1957: The Most Happy Fella – Frank Loesser
- 1958: The Music Man – Meredith Willson
- 1959: La Plume de Ma Tante – Robert Dhéry, Ross Parker, Francis Blanche, and Gérard Calvi
- 1960: Fiorello! – Jerry Bock, Sheldon Harnick, George Abbott and Jerome Weidman
- 1961: Carnival! – Michael Stewart and Bob Merrill
- 1962: How to Succeed in Business Without Really Trying – Abe Burrows, Jack Weinstock, Willie Gilbert, and Frank Loesser
- 1964: Hello, Dolly! – Michael Stewart and Jerry Herman
- 1965: Fiddler on the Roof – Jerry Bock, Sheldon Harnick and Joseph Stein
- 1966: Man of La Mancha – Dale Wasserman, Mitch Leigh, and Joe Darion
- 1967: Cabaret – John Kander, Fred Ebb, and Joe Masteroff
- 1968: Your Own Thing – Donald Driver, Hal Hester, and Danny Apolinar
- 1969: 1776 – Sherman Edwards and Peter Stone
- 1970: Company – Stephen Sondheim and George Furth
- 1971: Follies – Stephen Sondheim and James Goldman
- 1972: Two Gentlemen of Verona – Galt MacDermot, John Guare and Mel Shapiro
- 1973: A Little Night Music – Stephen Sondheim and Hugh Wheeler
- 1974: Candide – Leonard Bernstein, Richard Wilbur, Hugh Wheeler and John La Touche
- 1975: A Chorus Line – Marvin Hamlisch, Edward Kleban, James Kirkwood and Nicholas Dante
- 1976: Pacific Overtures – Stephen Sondheim, John Weidman and Hugh Wheeler
- 1977: Annie – Charles Strouse, Martin Charnin and Thomas Meehan
- 1978: Ain't Misbehavin' – Fats Waller and Richard Maltby Jr.
- 1979: Sweeney Todd – Stephen Sondheim and Hugh Wheeler
- 1980: Evita – Andrew Lloyd Webber and Tim Rice
- 1983: Little Shop of Horrors – Alan Menken and Howard Ashman
- 1984: Sunday in the Park with George – Stephen Sondheim and James Lapine
- 1987: Les Misérables – Claude-Michel Schönberg, Alain Boublil and Herbert Kretzmer
- 1988: Into the Woods – Stephen Sondheim and James Lapine
- 1990: City of Angels – Larry Gelbart, Cy Coleman, and David Zippel
- 1991: The Will Rogers Follies – Cy Coleman, Betty Comden, Adolph Green and Peter Stone
- 1993: Kiss of the Spider Woman – John Kander, Fred Ebb, and Terrence McNally
- 1996: Rent – Jonathan Larson
- 1997: Violet – Jeanine Tesori and Brian Crawley
- 1998: The Lion King – Elton John, Tim Rice, Roger Allers and Irene Mecchi
- 1999: Parade – Jason Robert Brown and Alfred Uhry
- 2000: James Joyce's The Dead – Shaun Davey and Richard Nelson
- 2001: The Producers – Mel Brooks and Thomas Meehan
- 2003: Hairspray – Marc Shaiman, Scott Wittman, Thomas Meehan and Mark O'Donnell
- 2006: The Drowsy Chaperone – Bob Martin, Don McKellar, Lisa Lambert and Greg Morrison
- 2007: Spring Awakening – Duncan Sheik and Steven Sater
- 2008: Passing Strange – Stew and Heidi Rodewald
- 2009: Billy Elliot the Musical – Elton John and Lee Hall
- 2011: The Book of Mormon – Trey Parker, Matt Stone and Robert Lopez
- 2012: Once – Enda Walsh, Glen Hansard and Markéta Irglová
- 2013: Matilda the Musical – Tim Minchin and Dennis Kelly
- 2014: Fun Home – Jeanine Tesori and Lisa Kron
- 2015: Hamilton – Lin-Manuel Miranda
- 2016: Shuffle Along, or, the Making of the Musical Sensation of 1921 and All That Followed – George C. Wolfe, Eubie Blake and Noble Sissle
- 2017: The Band's Visit – Itamar Moses and David Yazbek
- 2019: Tootsie – David Yazbek and Robert Horn
- 2020: A Strange Loop – Michael R. Jackson
- 2022: Kimberly Akimbo – David Lindsay-Abaire and Jeanine Tesori
- 2024: Dead Outlaw – Itamar Moses, David Yazbek and Erik Della Penna
- 2025: Maybe Happy Ending – Will Aronson and Hue Park

=== Best Foreign Play ===
- 1938: Shadow and Substance – Paul Vincent Carroll
- 1939: The White Steed – Paul Vincent Carroll
- 1941: The Corn Is Green – Emlyn Williams
- 1942: Blithe Spirit – Noël Coward
- 1944: Jacobowsky and the Colonel (Jacobowsky und der Oberst) – Franz Werfel
- 1947: No Exit – Jean-Paul Sartre
- 1948: The Winslow Boy – Terence Rattigan
- 1949: The Madwoman of Chaillot – Jean Giraudoux
- 1950: The Cocktail Party – T. S. Eliot
- 1951: The Lady's Not for Burning – Christopher Fry
- 1952: Venus Observed – Christopher Fry
- 1953: The Love of Four Colonels – Peter Ustinov
- 1954: Ondine – Jean Giraudoux
- 1955: Witness for the Prosecution – Agatha Christie
- 1956: Tiger at the Gates – Jean Giraudoux and Christopher Fry
- 1957: The Waltz of the Toreadors – Jean Anouilh
- 1958: Look Back in Anger – John Osborne
- 1959: The Visit – Friedrich Dürrenmatt and Maurice Valency
- 1960: Five Finger Exercise – Peter Shaffer
- 1961: A Taste of Honey – Shelagh Delaney
- 1962: A Man for All Seasons – Robert Bolt
- 1972: The Screens – Jean Genet
- 1980: Betrayal – Harold Pinter
- 1983: Plenty – David Hare
- 1986: Benefactors – Michael Frayn
- 1987: Les Liaisons Dangereuses – Christopher Hampton
- 1988: The Road to Mecca – Athol Fugard
- 1989: Aristocrats – Brian Friel
- 1990: Privates on Parade – Peter Nichols
- 1991: Our Country's Good – Timberlake Wertenbaker
- 1993: Someone Who'll Watch Over Me – Frank McGuinness
- 1996: Molly Sweeney – Brian Friel
- 1997: Skylight – David Hare
- 1999: Closer – Patrick Marber
- 2000: Copenhagen – Michael Frayn
- 2003: Talking Heads – Alan Bennett
- 2005: The Pillowman – Martin McDonagh
- 2009: Black Watch – Gregory Burke
- 2011: Jerusalem – Jez Butterworth
- 2012: Tribes – Nina Raine
- 2018: Hangmen – Martin McDonagh
- 2023: Leopoldstadt – Tom Stoppard

=== Best American Play ===
- 1970: The Effect of Gamma Rays on Man-in-the-Moon Marigolds – Paul Zindel
- 1971: The House of Blue Leaves – John Guare
- 1973: The Hot l Baltimore – Lanford Wilson
- 1974: Short Eyes – Miguel Piñero
- 1975: The Taking of Miss Janie – Ed Bullins
- 1976: Streamers – David Rabe
- 1977: American Buffalo – David Mamet
- 1981: Crimes of the Heart – Beth Henley
- 1982: A Soldier's Play – Charles Fuller
- 1984: Glengarry Glen Ross – David Mamet
- 1992: Two Trains Running – August Wilson
- 1995: Love! Valour! Compassion! – Terrence McNally
- 1998: Pride's Crossing – Tina Howe
- 2001: Proof – David Auburn
- 2007: Radio Golf – August Wilson
- 2014: All the Way – Robert Schenkkan
- 2019: What the Constitution Means to Me – Heidi Schreck

=== Best Individual Performance ===
- 2025: Andrew Scott – Vanya
- 2026: Alden Ehrenreich – Becky Shaw

=== Best Ensemble Performance ===
- 2025: The cast of Bess Wohl's Liberation
- 2026: The cast of Arthur Miller's Death of a Salesman

=== Special Citations ===
- 1952: Don Juan in Hell – George Bernard Shaw
- 1963: Beyond the Fringe – Alan Bennett, Peter Cook, Jonathan Miller and Dudley Moore
- 1964: The Trojan Women revival
- 1966: Mark Twain Tonight – Hal Holbrook
- 1971: Sticks and Bones by David Rabe and Old Times by Harold Pinter
- 1980: Peter Brook's Le Centre International de Créations Théâtricales at La MaMa
- 1981: Lena Horne for Lena Horne: The Lady and Her Music and New York Shakespeare Festival's The Pirates of Penzance
- 1983: Young Playwrights Festival
- 1984: Samuel Beckett for the body of his work
- 1986: The Search for Signs of Intelligent Life in the Universe – Lily Tomlin and Jane Wagner
- 1989: Largely New York – Bill Irwin
- 1992: Eileen Atkins – A Room of One's Own
- 1994: Anna Deavere Smith – Twilight: Los Angeles, 1992
- 1994: Signature Theatre Company's Horton Foote season
- 1997: Chicago revival — Encores!
- 1998: Cabaret – Roundabout Theatre Company
- 1999: David Hare
- 2002: Elaine Stritch for Elaine Stritch at Liberty
- 2004: Barbara Cook
- 2006: John Doyle, Sarah Travis and the Broadway revival of Sweeney Todd; Christine Ebersole for Grey Gardens
- 2007: Journey's End Broadway revival
- 2009: Angela Lansbury; Matthew Warchus and the cast of The Norman Conquests; Gerard Alessandrini for Forbidden Broadway
- 2010: Lincoln Center Festival; Viola Davis; Annie Baker
- 2011: The Normal Heart; Mark Rylance for La Bête and Jerusalem; and the direction, design and puppetry of War Horse
- 2012: Signature Theatre Company; Mike Nichols
- 2013: Soho Rep; New York City Center's Encores!; John Lee Beatty
- 2014: The Shakespeare's Globe productions of Twelfth Night and Richard III; Richard Nelson and the company of the Apple Family Plays
- 2015: Ars Nova; Bob Crowley
- 2016: Oskar Eustis; Lois Smith; Ivo van Hove and Jan Versweyveld
- 2017: Taylor Mac for A 24-Decade History of Popular Music, Ruben Santiago-Hudson and the cast of Jitney; Paula Vogel for career achievement as a playwright and mentor
- 2018: Park Avenue Armory for adventurous theatrical programming; Transport Group; the staging, design and illusions of Harry Potter and the Cursed Child
- 2019: Irish Repertory Theatre; Page 73; National Yiddish Theatre Folksbiene's revival of Fiddler on the Roof (Fidler Afn Dakh)
- 2020: David Byrne and the Broadway production of American Utopia; Deirdre O'Connell; the New York theater community for perseverance in the face of loss during the COVID-19 pandemic
- 2022: Austin Pendleton; Sanaz Toossi
- 2023: Broadway revival of Parade; Adrienne Kennedy; La MaMa Experimental Theatre Club
- 2024: Broadway revivals of Merrily We Roll Along and Purlie Victorious; Maryann Plunkett and Jay O. Sanders; Heather Christian
- 2025: Cole Escola for Oh, Mary!; Cats: The Jellicle Ball; David Greenspan
- 2026: Lincoln Center Theatre revival of Ragtime; Qween Jean for costume design; Wallace Shawn and André Gregory for career achievement

== Runners-up ==
Year	Show	Author(s)	Nominated for
1936	Idiot's Delight	Robert E. Sherwood	Best American Play
1937	Johnny Johnson	Kurt Weill and Paul Green	Best Musical
1938	Our Town	Thornton Wilder	Best American Play
1941	The Beautiful People	William Saroyan	Best American Play
1941	Native Son	Paul Green and Richard Wright	Best American Play
1943	The Skin of Our Teeth	Thornton Wilder	Best American Play
1947	The Iceman Cometh	Eugene O'Neill	Best American Play
1949	Kiss Me, Kate	Cole Porter, Bella Spewack, and Sam Spewack	Best Musical
1951	Billy Budd	Louis O. Coxe and Robert Chapman	Best American Play
1951	The King and I	Richard Rodgers and Oscar Hammerstein II	Best Musical
1952	Mrs. McThing	Mary Coyle Chase	Best American Play
1953	The Crucible	Arthur Miller	Best American Play
1954	The Caine Mutiny Court-Martial	Herman Wouk	Best American Play
1955	Bus Stop	William Inge	Best American Play
1962	Gideon	Paddy Chayefsky	Best American Play
1965	Luv	Murray Schisgal	Best Play
1965	The Odd Couple	Neil Simon	Best Play
1966	Philadelphia, Here I Come!	Brian Friel	Best Play
1966	The Royal Hunt of the Sun	Peter Shaffer	Best Play
1967	A Delicate Balance	Edward Albee	Best Play
1969	Hadrian the Seventh	Peter Luke	Best Play
1970	Indians	Arthur Kopit	Best American Play
1971	The Trial of the Catonsville Nine	Daniel Berrigan	Best American Play
1972	Sticks and Bones	David Rabe	Best Play
1972	Old Times	Harold Pinter	Best Foreign Play
1973	Seesaw	Cy Coleman, Dorothy Fields, and Michael Bennett	Best Musical
1973	Pippin	Stephen Schwartz, Bob Fosse, and Roger O. Hirson	Best Musical
1974	In the Boom Boom Room	David Rabe	Best American Play
1975	The Island	Athol Fugard	Best Play
1975	Seascape	Edward Albee	Best American Play
1977	No Man's Land	Harold Pinter	Best Play
1977	I Love My Wife	Cy Coleman and Michael Stewart	Best Musical
1981	Amadeus	Peter Shaffer	Best Play
1982	"Master Harold"...and the Boys	Athol Fugard	Best Play
1982	Torch Song Trilogy	Harvey Fierstein	Best American Play
1983	'night, Mother	Marsha Norman	Best Play
1983	Top Girls	Caryl Churchill	Best Foreign Play
1983	Quartermaine's Terms	Simon Gray	Best Foreign Play
1985	Biloxi Blues	Neil Simon	Best Play
1987	Me and My Girl	Noel Gay, Douglas Furber, and L. Arthur Rose	Best Musical
1988	M. Butterfly	David Henry Hwang	Best Play
1988	The Phantom of the Opera	Andrew Lloyd Webber, Charles Hart, and Richard Stilgoe	Best Musical
1990	The Grapes of Wrath	Frank Galati	Best Play
1990	Prelude to a Kiss	Craig Lucas	Best Play
1991	The Secret Garden	Lucy Simon and Marsha Norman	Best Musical
1992	Marvin's Room	Scott McPherson	Best American Play
1994	Angels in America: Perestroika	Tony Kushner	Best Play
1997	The Life	Cy Coleman, Ira Gasman, and David Newman	Best Musical
1998	The Beauty Queen of Leenane	Martin McDonagh	Best Play
1998	Three Days of Rain	Richard Greenberg	Best American Play
1998	Ragtime	Stephen Flaherty, Lynn Ahrens, and Terrence McNally	Best Musical
2000	Contact	John Weidman	Best Musical
2001	The Play About the Baby	Edward Albee	Best American Play
2007	Radio Golf	August Wilson	Best Play
2007	Frost/Nixon	Peter Morgan	Best Play
2007	Dying City	Christopher Shinn	Best American Play
2007	Indian Blood	A.R. Gurney	Best American Play
2008	Adding Machine	Jason Loewith and Joshua Schmidt	Best Musical
2008	The Seafarer	Conor McPherson	Best Play
2008	Rock 'n' Roll	Tom Stoppard	Best Play
2009	Next to Normal	Tom Kitt and Brian Yorkey	Best Musical
2009	Road Show	Stephen Sondheim and John Weidman	Best Musical
2009	God of Carnage	Yasmina Reza	Best Foreign Play
2009	Blasted	Sarah Kane	Best Foreign Play

== See also ==
- Tony Awards
- Drama Desk Awards
- Obie Awards
- Laurence Olivier Awards
- Critics' Circle Theatre Awards

== Notes ==
- "Performing Arts Awards: New York Drama Critics' Circle Awards". Infoplease.com. 2008.
- Jones, Kenneth (May 11, 2006). "NY Drama Critics' Circle Awards Go to History Boys, Drowsy Chaperone, Sweeney Todd and Ebersole". Playbill.
- "New York Drama Critics' Circle Awards Go to Utopia, Spring, Golf and Journey's End". Broadway.com. May 7, 2007.
- Gans, Andrew (May 4, 2009). "Ruined, Billy Elliot and Black Watch Win New York Drama Critics' Circle Awards". Playbill.
