= Bobby Steggert =

American therapist and former actor

- Born: March 2, 1981 (age 45); Frederick, Maryland, U.S.
- Education: New York University (BFA); Royal Academy of Dramatic Art; Columbia University (MSW)

Bobby Steggert (born March 2, 1981) is an American therapist and former actor of theatre, television and film.

== Early life and education ==
He was born in Frederick, Maryland. Steggert attended Frederick High School, and graduated in 1999 as valedictorian of his class.

Steggert graduated from New York University's Tisch School of the Arts in New York City, and studied a yearlong foundation course at the Royal Academy of Dramatic Art in London, England.

== Career ==
Steggert joined the cast of the television soap opera All My Children, appearing as Sam Grey from March 2005 until his final appearance on December 20, 2005.

After appearing in, among other Broadway and Off-Broadway productions, "Master Harold"...and the Boys, A Christmas Carol, The New Group's The Music Teacher and columbinus at the New York Theatre Workshop, Steggert starred as Jimmy Curry in the 2007 Broadway revival of the musical 110 in the Shade, a role which garnered him an Outer Critics Circle Award nomination.

Steggert then appeared at the Vineyard Theatre in Manhattan as the male lead in the 2008 musical The Slug Bearers of Kayrol Island (Or, the Friends of Dr. Rushower), with libretto and drawings by Ben Katchor, music by Mark Mulcahy and directed by Bob McGrath. For his role, he was nominated for both the Drama Desk Award for Outstanding Featured Actor in a Musical and the Drama League Award for Distinguished Performance.

He has appeared in numerous roles around the country. Highlights include the Dauphin in George Bernard Shaw's Saint Joan and Juliet in Shakespeare's Romeo and Juliet at The Repertory Theater of St. Louis, The Cripple of Inishmaan at the Milwaukee Repertory Theater, and "Master Harold"...and the Boys and Speech and Debate at L.A. Theatre Works.

His film credits include For Richer or Poorer (1997), directed by Bryan Spicer; Kinsey (2004), directed by Bill Condon; Game 6 (2005), directed by Michael Hoffman; and The Namesake (2006), directed by Mira Nair.

He appeared in a production of Ragtime at the John F. Kennedy Center for the Performing Arts in Washington, D.C., in April 2009. He later starred in the short-lived Broadway revival of the Kennedy Center's production of Ragtime in the role of Mother's Younger Brother.

He then starred in the Off-Broadway production of Yank: A WWII Love Story at the York Theatre Company in the spring of 2010.

He starred in A. R. Gurney's The Grand Manner at Lincoln Center Theater in the summer of 2010, opposite Kate Burton, Boyd Gaines and Brenda Wehle.

Steggert starred as Will Bloom in the musical version of Big Fish alongside Norbert Leo Butz and Kate Baldwin. It ran for 98 performances from September 5 through December 29, 2013. Ben Brantley's New York Times review (October 6, 2013) said, "Mr. Steggert's singing exudes a radiant sincerity that transcends corn."

He co-starred (as Will Ogden) with Tyne Daly in the premiere of Terrence McNally's Mothers and Sons at the Bucks County Playhouse in New Hope, Pennsylvania. It had a limited run of 14 performances from June 13 to 23, 2013. The cast was interviewed by Theatre Sensation's Kelli Curtin: "Bobby Steggert plays the character of Will in this play. Steggert describes his character as, "a modern gay man where being a husband to a man and having children is a viable option. My character represents the progress that has been made in society. My character is strong willed, steadfast in point of view and I admire that about him." According to Steggert, this play is important because it is about relationships and families. He states, "Twenty years ago a play like this would be classified as a 'gay drama.' Now a play that addresses issues faced by gay people is mainstream. The characters in this play are interesting because they are people and not because of their sexuality." Steggert is hopeful that people that see this play will "broaden their definition of family after seeing Mothers and Sons through observing the family on stage." Mothers and Sons ran on Broadway at the John Golden Theatre from February 23, 2014, to June 22, 2014, with Steggert and Daly, joined by Fred Weller, and original director Sheryl Kaller.

In March 2016 Steggert starred Off-Broadway in the title role of Adam, in Anna Zeigler's Boy at the Clurman Theatre.

Around 2016, Steggert "completely turned my back on an acting career that I had spent twenty years building." He earned a Master's in Social Work from Columbia University and trained as a therapist at the Institute of Contemporary Psychotherapy in their Gender and Sexuality Program. In an announcement of his retirement from acting, he stated, "if I ever return to acting, it will be with this knowledge (and I hope it reminds you of your own possibilities) — that the work does not stop when unemployed — that you are an artist every day, if you so choose — that art is an obligation, and that it must be lived, not simply offered to those who have paid the price of admission."

Steggert returned from his acting break in 2024 when he was cast to play painter John Singer Sargent in the third season of HBO's series The Gilded Age (2022-).

== Stage ==
Year	Title	Role	Venue	Ref.
2003	"Master Harold"...and the Boys	Understudy (Hally)	Broadway, Royale Theatre	
2006	The Music Teacher	Rupert / Bellman	Off-Broadway, Minetta Lane Theatre	
2006	Columbinus	Prep	New York Theatre Workshop	
2006	Shakespeare's R&J	Student #2	The Repertory Theatre of St. Louis	
2007	110 in the Shade	Jimmy Curry	Broadway, Studio 54	
2008	The Slug Bearers of Kayrol Island (or the Friends of Dr. Rushower)	Immanuel Lubang	Vineyard Theater	
2008	Camelot	Mordred	Avery Fisher Hall	
2009	Saint Joan	The Dauphin	The Repertory Theatre of St. Louis	
2009	Ragtime	Mother's Younger Brother	Kennedy Center	
2010	Ragtime	Mother's Younger Brother	Broadway, Neil Simon Theatre	
2010	Yank!	Stu	Off-Broadway, The York Theatre Company	
2010	The Grand Manner	Pete	Lincoln Center Theater	
2011	A Minister's Wife	Eugene Marchbanks	Off-Broadway, Lincoln Center Theater	
2012	Assistance	Justin	Off-Broadway, Playwrights Horizons	
2012	The Nightingale	Young Emperor	La Jolla Playhouse	
2012	Harbour	Kevin	Westport County Playhouse	
2012	Giant	Jordy jr.	The Public Theater	
2013	Big Fish	Will Bloom	Oriental Theatre	
2013	Mothers and Sons	Will Ogden	Bucks County Playhouse	
2013	Big Fish	Will Bloom	Broadway, Neil Simon Theatre	
2014	Mothers and Sons	Will Ogden	Broadway, John Golden Theatre	
2015	Big Love	Nikos	Off-Broadway, Pershing Square Signature Center	
2015	My Paris	Henri de Tolouse-Lautrec	Goodspeed Musicals	
2016	Boy	Adam Turner	Off-Broadway, Theatre Row Building	
2016	My Paris	Henri de Tolouse-Lautrec	Long Wharf Theatre	

== Film and television ==
Key
†	Denotes films that have not yet been released

Year	Title	Role	Notes	Ref.
1997	For Richer or Poorer	Samuel Yodel Jr.		
2004	Kinsey	Male Student #3		
2005	Game 6	Son in Play		
2005	Night Swimming	Otter	Short film	
2005	All My Children	Sam Grey	5 episodes	
2006	The Namesake	Jason		
2007	Yank! A World War II Story	Stu		
2008	Live from Lincoln Center	Mordred	Filmed version of Camelot	
2009	The Battery's Down	Finian Black	Episode: "The Party's Over"	
2010	The Good Wife	Wyatt Stevens, Jr.	Episode: "Breaking Fast"	
2017	The Get Down	Jobriath Boone	Episode: "Only From Exile Can We Come Home"	
2018	The Marvelous Mrs. Maisel	Phipps	Episode: "Midnight at the Concord"	
2025	The Gilded Age	John Singer Sargent	2 episodes	

== Personal life ==
In September 2013, Out magazine reported that Steggert is gay.

== Awards and nominations ==
Year	Award	Category	Work	Result	Ref.
2007	Outer Critics Circle Awards	Outstanding Featured Actor in a Musical	110 in the Shade	Nominated	
2008	Drama League Awards	Distinguished Performance	The Slug Bearers of Kayrol Island	Nominated	
2008	Drama Desk Awards	Outstanding Featured Actor in a Musical	The Slug Bearers of Kayrol Island	Nominated	
2010	Drama League Awards	Distinguished Performance	Yank!	Nominated	
2010	Drama Desk Awards	Outstanding Actor in a Musical	Yank!	Nominated	
2010	Drama Desk Awards	Outstanding Featured Actor in a Musical	Ragtime	Nominated	
2010	Tony Awards	Best Featured Actor in a Musical	Ragtime	Nominated	
2010	Outer Critics Circle Awards	Outstanding Featured Actor in a Musical	Ragtime	Nominated	
2010	Drama League Awards	Distinguished Performance	Ragtime	Nominated	
2010	Dorothy Louden Award for Excellence		Yank! and Ragtime	Won	
2014	Drama Desk Awards	Outstanding Featured Actor in a Musical	Big Fish	Nominated	

== Discography ==
- What I Wanna Be When I Grow Up by Scott Alan, sings the song Over The Mountains (2010)
- Big Fish: Original Broadway Cast Recording as Will Bloom. Music and lyrics by Andrew Lippa (2014)
- Ahrens and Flaherty: Nice Fighting You - A 30th Anniversary Celebration Live at 54 BELOW (2014), performing Larger Than Life from My Favorite Year, The Night That Goldman Spoke at Union Square from Ragtime and, with Annaleigh Ashford, Close, but No Cigar from an unproduced musical version of Bedazzled.
- Yank!: Original Cast Recording as Stu

== See also ==
- List of NYU Tisch School of the Arts people
- List of people from Maryland
- List of people from New York City
- List of Royal Academy of Dramatic Art alumni
- List of soap opera actors
