= Well (play) =

2004 play written by Lisa Kron

- Well Playbill
- Written by: Lisa Kron

Premiere
- Date: March 16, 2004
- Place: Joseph Papp Public Theater

Well is a play by Lisa Kron. It concerns relationships between mothers and daughters and "wellness", among other themes. It ran Off-Broadway in 2004 and then on Broadway in 2006.

== Production history ==
Well premiered Off-Broadway at the Joseph Papp Public Theater, opening on March 16, 2004 (previews), and running to May 16, 2004. Directed by Leigh Silverman, the cast starred Lisa Kron and Jayne Houdyshell as Lisa's mother, Ann Kron. The Public Theater production garnered "Best of 2004" lists in The New York Times among other publications.

Well next ran at the American Conservatory Theater in San Francisco in February and March 2005, with Kron and Houdyshell.

The play opened on Broadway at the Longacre Theatre on March 10, 2006 in previews, officially on March 30, and closed on May 14, 2006 after 23 previews and 52 performances. Directed by Leigh Silverman, Lisa Kron and Jayne Houdyshell repeated their roles from the Off-Broadway production. According to Playbill, it "opened to some of the best reviews for any play this season."

The play was performed by the Huntington Theatre Company at the Boston University Theater in March 2007, with Kron and Mary Pat Gleason as her mother, and at the Oregon Shakespeare Festival in their 2010 season, running February to June 2010.

Well premiered in London at the Trafalgar Studios 2, from 4 September 2008 (previews) to 27 September 2008 and transferred to the Apollo Theatre, London, from 29 December 2008 (previews), 30 December 2008 (official opening) and closed 24 January 2009 after 32 performances. The cast starred Natalie Casey as Lisa Kron and Sarah Miles as her mother, with direction by Eve Leigh.

== Overview ==
Lisa Kron, as herself, presents her play as a work in progress, about mothers and daughters, "illness" and "wellness". The character of Lisa begins the "play": "This play is not about my mother and me." Kron focuses on her family "medical history and the Lansing, Michigan neighborhood where she grew up to knit together issues of health and illness both in the individual (her chronically unwell mother) and in a community." Ann Kron, Lisa's mother, is a semi-invalid. As the "play" progresses, Lisa tries to discuss her past in Michigan and her mother. However, Ann corrects Lisa's version of their past, and the other actors leave their assigned roles and instead talk with Ann about her life.

Well is "Lisa Kron's journey into her past. It's about her mother, her well-being and the alternate universe your parents live in where your therapy has no power." Producer Elizabeth Ireland McCann noted that the play "is hard to define. How do you pigeonhole something that is singular? How do you explain that Lisa Kron is playing herself in what she bills (as she reads note cards on stage) a 'theatrical exploration'?...'That is, I think, always a bit of problem with Well…it's a very hard play to describe.'"

== Critical reception ==
Ben Brantley, in his review for The New York Times, wrote "What makes 'Well' much more than a clever, deconstructed theatrical riff is the way it keeps surprising itself with glimpses of an emotional depth, both murky and luminous, that goes beyond any tidy narrative."

Elyse Sommer, in her review for CurtainUp, wrote: "This being a serio-comedy, the final mother-daughter confrontation ends on a satisfying note. While the play would have benefited from some trimming of the hospital and neighborhood scenes, director Leigh Silverman otherwise keeps all three plot elements bouncing along -- Lisa's narrative, the scenes acted out from her play and the play-interruptus business courtesy of the well-meaning mother."

== Awards and nominations ==
Kron (Best Performance by a Leading Actress in a Play) and Houdyshell (Best Featured Actress in a Play) received 2006 Tony Award nominations. Houdyshell also was nominated for the Drama Desk Award, Outer Critics Circle Award and Lucille Lortel Award, and won the Obie Award, Outstanding Performance. The play was nominated for the Outer Critics Circle Award as Outstanding Off-Broadway Play.
