= Mothers and Sons (play) =

2013 play written by Terrence McNally

- 2014 Broadway production playbill
- Original language: English
- Written by: Terrence McNally
- Characters: Nancy; Bill; Carla; Ben; Tommy; Jess; Bryan
- Genre: Drama

Premiere
- Date: June 13, 2013
- Place: Bucks County Playhouse

Mothers and Sons is a play by Terrence McNally, which is a follow-up to his previous play, Andre's Mother about a mother who lost her son to AIDS. The play premiered in 2013 at Bucks County Playhouse, before opening on Broadway in 2014. The play was nominated for the 2014 Tony Award for Best Play.

== Plot ==
The play takes place 20 years after the events in McNally's 1990 television play Andre's Mother. Katharine Gerard lost her son to AIDS 20 years ago, and now Katherine visits her son's partner, Cal, who has married Will. The two attempt to reconcile.

== Production history ==
Mothers and Sons had its world premiere at the Bucks County Playhouse, Pennsylvania, in June 2013. Directed by Sheryl Kaller, the cast starred Tyne Daly, Manoel Felciano and Bobby Steggert.

Mothers and Sons opened on Broadway at the John Golden Theatre on March 24, 2014, after previews from February 23, 2014. Directed by Sheryl Kaller, the cast stars Tyne Daly as Katharine Gerard, Fred Weller (Cal), Bobby Steggert (Will) and Grayson Taylor (Bud). The scenic design is by John Lee Beatty, costumes by Jess Goldstein, lighting by Jeff Croiter and sound by Nevin Steinberg. The play closed on June 22, 2014 after 104 performances and 33 previews.

Regional and International

The play was produced by the Philadelphia Theatre Company from February 6, 2015 to March 8, 2015, directed by Wendy C. Goldberg and starring Michael Learned as Katherine Gerard. It ran at Speakeasy Stage Company in Boston from May 8, 2015 to June 6, 2015. The Aux Dog Theatre in Albuquerque, New Mexico presented the play from February 22, 2015 to March 15, 2015.

The play ran in Argentina since May 11. The play was produced by Ensemble Theatre in Sydney from August 21 to September 27, 2015.

The play opened February 10, 2016 in Columbus, Ohio, produced by CATCO and closed February 28, 2016.

== Cast and characters ==
Character	Bucks County Playhouse 2013	Broadway 2014
Katharine Gerard	Tyne Daly	Tyne Daly
Will Ogden	Bobby Steggert	Bobby Steggert
Cal Porter	Manoel Felciano	Fred Weller
Bud Ogden-Porter	Grayson Taylor	Grayson Taylor

== Critical reception ==
Ben Brantley, reviewing in The New York Times, wrote: " 'Mothers and Sons'... is, in essence, a debate play with fraught emotional underpinnings, and it doesn’t avoid the stasis of that genre. It also tends to sabotage its potential to move us by making the debate, rather than psychological credibility, its first priority.... Ms. Daly...again proves herself one of our most formidable stage actresses.... She and the play are at their strongest, though, not in what is spoken, however articulately, but in tacitly suggesting a sorrow beyond words that is always waiting to resurface."

Chris Jones, in his review for the Chicago Tribune wrote that the play is "moving, intensely resonant". He noted that "To a large extent, McNally is chronicling the revolutionary changes he has seen in the lives of gay Americans — and what playwright has more right to do so?"

== Awards and nominations ==
=== 2014 Broadway production ===
Year	Award	Category	Work	Result	Ref.
2014	Tony Award	Best Play		Nominated	
2014	Tony Award	Best Actress in a Play	Tyne Daly	Nominated	
2014	Drama Desk Award	Outstanding Actress in a Play	Tyne Daly	Nominated	
2014	Drama League Award	Outstanding Production of a Musical		Nominated}	
2014	Drama League Award	Distinguished Performance	Tyne Daly	Nominated	
2014	Outer Critics Circle Award	Outstanding Actress in a Play	Tyne Daly	Nominated	
