= The Humans (2015 play) =

Play written by Stephen Karam

- 2016 Broadway production playbill
- Original language: English
- Written by: Stephen Karam
- Characters: Erik; Deirdre; Richard; Fiona "Momo" Blake; Aimee; Brigid
- Subject: Family
- Setting: An apartment in lower Manhattan

Premiere
- Date: September 30, 2015
- Place: Roundabout Theatre Company – Laura Pels Theatre
- Official website

The Humans is a one-act play written by Stephen Karam. The play opened on Broadway in 2016 after an engagement Off-Broadway in 2015. The Humans was a finalist for the 2016 Pulitzer Prize for Drama and won the 2016 Tony Award for Best Play.

== Plot ==
The entire play takes place during a single evening in a sparsely furnished, somewhat shabby basement duplex apartment in New York City’s Chinatown. Brigid Blake, a young aspiring composer, and her boyfriend Richard Saad, who is completing his social work degree, have just moved in together and are hosting Thanksgiving dinner for Brigid’s family.

The guests are Brigid’s working-class, Irish-American parents, Erik and Deirdre Blake, her sister Aimee, a Philadelphia lawyer suffering from ulcerative colitis and a recent breakup with her girlfriend, and Fiona “Momo” Blake, Brigid’s grandmother, who suffers from severe dementia. Momo frequently mumbles incoherently throughout the evening, requiring constant care and attention.

As the family settles in, old patterns of conversation, teasing, and tension quickly reemerge. Erik and Deirdre disapprove of Brigid living with Richard before marriage and are skeptical of her career ambitions. Deirdre, who works an unglamorous office job, also expresses resentment about how she feels mocked for her lack of sophistication. Erik, meanwhile, is distracted and uneasy the whole night, increasingly frayed and preoccupied.

Richard, whose family is wealthy, tries to make polite conversation but feels somewhat alienated from the Blakes’ dynamic. He mentions that he’s about to inherit a trust fund when he turns forty, suggesting a different kind of future stability that Brigid’s parents can’t guarantee. Brigid resents her parents for not supporting her financially after grad school. Deirdre feels increasingly marginalized and left out of her daughters’ lives.

Underlying all of this is Erik’s growing anxiety. Eventually, he reveals the real reason for his unease: he has been fired from his job as a janitor at a Catholic school after an incident that, while not fully detailed, involved inappropriate behavior — possibly being caught sleeping overnight at the school. Compounding the situation, Erik and Deirdre had invested heavily in a lake house in Scranton for retirement, but they were forced to sell it at a loss after Erik’s firing. Now they are facing serious financial insecurity.

Meanwhile, Momo has a sudden, violent outburst, needing to be restrained and comforted. The family members scramble to soothe her, exposing their vulnerabilities and their love for her despite everything.

The play carries an almost horror-movie-like atmosphere: strange thumps are heard from the apartment above, lights flicker and buzz, mysterious stains appear on the ceiling, and the apartment feels unsettlingly dark and oppressive.

In the final moments, after the family leaves and Richard goes downstairs to do laundry, Erik, left alone in the darkening apartment, becomes overwhelmed by fear and grief. Terrified and paralyzed by his failures, the loss of security, and the disintegration of his life as he knew it, Erik collapses emotionally as the lights go out completely.

== Cast and characters ==
Notable casts

Character	Off-Broadway debut	Broadway debut	National tour	Feature film
Character	2015	2016	2017	2021
Aimee Blake	Cassie Beck	Cassie Beck	Therese Plaehn	Amy Schumer
Brigid Blake	Sarah Steele	Sarah Steele	Daisy Eagan	Beanie Feldstein
Erik Blake	Reed Birney	Reed Birney	Richard Thomas	Richard Jenkins
Deidre Blake	Jayne Houdyshell	Jayne Houdyshell	Pamela Reed	Jayne Houdyshell
Fiona "Momo" Blake	Laura Klein	Laura Klein	Laura Klein	June Squibb
Richard	Arian Moayed	Arian Moayed	Luis Vega	Steven Yeun

== Productions ==
The play had its world premiere at the American Theater Company in Chicago, Illinois, in November 2014, directed by PJ Paparelli. Chris Jones, in his review for the Chicago Tribune, wrote: "kind, warm, beautifully observed and deeply moving new play, a celebration of working-class familial imperfection and affection and a game-changing work for this gifted young playwright."

The Humans opened Off-Broadway at the Laura Pels Theatre on September 30, 2015, in previews, and officially on October 25, 2015, in a limited run produced by the Roundabout Theatre Company, with positive reviews, and ran until January 3, 2016. It transferred to Broadway at the Helen Hayes Theatre, opening on February 18, 2016, and closing on July 24, 2016. The play then transferred to the Schoenfeld Theatre, re-opening on August 9, 2016. (The Helen Hayes had major renovations starting in August 2016.) The play closed its Broadway engagement on January 15, 2017.

Directed by Joe Mantello, the Off-Broadway cast featured Cassie Beck (Aimee), Reed Birney (Erik), Jayne Houdyshell (Deirdre), Lauren Klein (Fiona "Momo" Blake), Arian Moayed (Richard), and Sarah Steele (Brigid). While off-Broadway, the script won the 2016 Obie Awards for Karam's playwriting and Houdyshell's performance. The Off-Broadway cast moved to Broadway.

The Pittsburgh Public Theater staged The Humans from November 9 to December 10, 2017, directed by Pamela Berlin; it was admiringly reviewed in the Pittsburgh Post-Gazette. Artists Repertory Theatre, located in Portland, Oregon, staged it from November 19 to December 17.

The play embarked on a limited US national tour, starting in November 2017 at the Seattle Repertory Theatre. The tour cast featured Richard Thomas as Erik, Pamela Reed as Deirdre, Daisy Eagan as Brigid, Lauren Klein as Momo, Therese Plaehn as Aimee and Luis Vega as Richard. The tour concluded on July 29, 2018, at the Ahmanson Theatre in Los Angeles.

The play opened in London at the Hampstead Theatre in September 2018 and closed on October 13, 2018. The Broadway cast reprised their roles, as did the director Mantello.

Off the Dock Players produced the play in Sandwich, New Hampshire. It opened on February 14, 2020, and closed on February 23. The production was directed by Nancy Blaine and starred Hank Offinger, Rebecca Cole, Ashley Bullard, Abe Garon, Marena Harris, and Lisa Thompson.

"The Humans" had a Japanese premier in the New National Theater, Tokyo, between June 12–29, 2025. The Japanese translated production is directed by Yuko Kuwahara, known for her 2022 NNT production "Lobby Hero". The cast includes Shizuyo Yamazaki as Amy, Aoyama Misato as Brigid, Takeshi Hosokawa as Richard, Miyoko Inagawa as Momo, Masuko Wabunko as Deirdre, Mitsuru Hirata as Eric and Kishi Shusha as the Elderly Chinese woman.

== Critical response ==
In his review of the Broadway production in The New York Times, Charles Isherwood called it the "finest new play of the Broadway season so far" and praised the cast, direction, and the set "... that perfectly captures the unsettled atmosphere the writing so deftly establishes."

Jesse Green, reviewing the Broadway production for Vulture, wrote: "With its irrational layout and strange, sickening noises, the apartment, as the stage directions put it, is 'effortlessly uncanny,' as is the play itself ... It is still the most, well, human play I’ve ever seen about fear and disappointment and the attachments that transcend them."

The Pulitzer Prize committee called the play a “profoundly affecting drama that sketches the psychological and emotional contours of an average American family."

== Awards and nominations ==
=== Original Off-Broadway production ===
Year	Award	Category	Nominee	Result
2016	Lucille Lortel Awards	Outstanding Lead Actor in a Play	Reed Birney	Nominated
2016	Lucille Lortel Awards	Outstanding Lead Actress in a Play	Jayne Houdyshell	Nominated
2016	Lucille Lortel Awards	Outstanding Featured Actress in a Play	Lauren Klein	Nominated
2016	Lucille Lortel Awards	Outstanding Scenic Design	David Zinn	Nominated
2016	Lucille Lortel Awards	Outstanding Lighting Design	Justin Townsend	Nominated
2016	Lucille Lortel Awards	Outstanding Sound Design	Fitz Patton	Nominated
2016	Drama Desk Awards	Outstanding Play		Won
2016	Drama Desk Awards	Outstanding Ensemble		Won
2016	Drama Desk Awards	Outstanding Direction of a Play	Joe Mantello	Nominated
2016	Drama Desk Awards	Outstanding Lighting Design of a Play	Justin Townsend	Won
2016	Drama Desk Awards	Outstanding Sound Design of a Play	Fitz Patton	Won
2016	Obie Awards	Playwriting	Stephen Karam	Won
2016	Obie Awards	Distinguished Performance by an Actress	Jayne Houdyshell	Won

=== Original Broadway production ===
Year	Award	Category	Nominee	Result
2016	Tony Awards	Best Play		Won
2016	Tony Awards	Best Featured Actor in a Play	Reed Birney	Won
2016	Tony Awards	Best Featured Actress in a Play	Jayne Houdyshell	Won
2016	Tony Awards	Best Scenic Design in a Play	David Zinn	Won
2016	Tony Awards	Best Lighting Design in a Play	Justin Townsend	Nominated
2016	Tony Awards	Best Direction of a Play	Joe Mantello	Nominated
2016	Pulitzer Prize	Drama		Nominated
2016	Drama League Awards	Outstanding Production of a Broadway or Off-Broadway Play		Won
2016	Drama League Awards	Distinguished Performance	Reed Birney	Nominated
2016	Drama League Awards	Distinguished Performance	Jayne Houdyshell	Nominated
2016	Outer Critics Circle Awards			
2016	Outer Critics Circle Awards	Outstanding New Broadway Play		Won
2016	Outer Critics Circle Awards	Outstanding Actor in a Play	Reed Birney	Nominated
2016	Outer Critics Circle Awards	Outstanding Actress in a Play	Jayne Houdyshell	Nominated
2016	Outer Critics Circle Awards	Outstanding Director of a Play	Joe Mantello	Nominated
2016	New York Drama Critics Circle	Best Play	Stephen Karam	Won

== Film adaptation ==
A film adaptation of the play, written and directed by Karam, began production in September 2019. It was released in November 2021.
