= The Humans (film) =

American drama film

- Official poster
- Directed by: Stephen Karam
- Screenplay by: Stephen Karam
- Based on: The Humans by Stephen Karam
- Produced by: Louise Lovegrove; Stephen Karam
- Starring: Jayne Houdyshell; Richard Jenkins; Amy Schumer; Beanie Feldstein; Steven Yeun; June Squibb
- Cinematography: Lol Crawley
- Edited by: Nick Houy
- Music by: Nico Muhly
- Production companies: A24; IAC Films
- Distributed by: A24; Showtime
- Release dates: September 12, 2021 (TIFF); November 24, 2021 (United States)
- Running time: 108 minutes
- Country: United States
- Language: English

The Humans is a 2021 American psychological drama film written and directed by Stephen Karam in his feature directorial debut, and based on his 2015 one-act play. It stars Richard Jenkins, Jayne Houdyshell, Amy Schumer, Beanie Feldstein, Steven Yeun, and June Squibb. The Humans premiered at the 2021 Toronto International Film Festival on September 12, 2021. The film was released by A24 on November 24, 2021, both in theaters and on Showtime.

== Plot ==
On Thanksgiving, Erik and Deirdre Blake, their daughter Aimee, and Erik's senile mother, Momo, visit their other daughter, Brigid and her partner Richard at their new apartment in Chinatown. Erik is immediately disapproving of the run-down apartment in a flood risk zone and close to Ground Zero. On 9/11, he had driven Aimee to a job interview and had planned to visit the observation deck of the Twin Towers, but had waited across the street as the deck had not yet opened for the morning. He has also been haunted by memories of seeing a deceased victim who resembled Aimee.

As the evening wears on, tension and unhappiness in the family is evident. Brigid is openly resentful that her parents have not given her money to afford a better lifestyle, and privately wounded that her dreams of being a composer have not come into fruition. Both she and her partner face Deirdre's disapproval that they are not yet married. Richard has struggled with depression and is treading water in his personal life and career, as he will be a recipient of a trust fund that he will not receive until he is 40, five years from now.

Aimee has a chronic illness, recently lost both her job and her longtime girlfriend, and will need to get her colon removed. Deirdre has arthritis and is on the receiving end of mockery from the rest of the family due to her religious attitude, and Erik, already depressed over Momo's condition, clashes with Brigid by judging her work ethic and new-age, urban lifestyle.

There is a brief respite when Deirdre reads the daughters a letter that Momo wrote when still lucid, apologizing for her deterioration and assuring them that she will always love them, and to not get so worked up over life's problems.

The family eventually begins talking about their dreams and nightmares. Richard is open and honest about his own, but Erik is reserved about revealing his own. Eventually, he confesses that he has nightmares about a faceless woman, implied to be reflective of his 9/11 trauma. The rest of the family teases him about the faceless woman, much to his discomfort.

Prodded by Deirdre, Erik confesses to his daughters that he had an affair with one of the teachers at the Catholic school he was working at, resulting in loss of both his job as well as his pension. He reveals that their beloved lakehouse had to be sold to cover the costs of Momo's care. Despite Erik's assurance that he and Deirdre received counseling and have moved past his infidelity, the daughters are appalled and disillusioned with their father.

As Thanksgiving ends, the visiting family members depart for a hotel. As the rest help Momo get into the taxi, Erik lingers behind in the apartment, attempting to fix a power outage; however, he becomes disoriented and suffers a panic attack in the darkness, leaving him whimpering and praying. He only comes to his senses when Brigid re-enters the apartment to collect him, and they leave together.

== Cast ==
- Beanie Feldstein as Brigid Blake
- Richard Jenkins as Erik Blake
- Jayne Houdyshell as Deirdre Blake
- Amy Schumer as Aimee Blake
- Steven Yeun as Richard
- June Squibb as Momo

== Production ==
A24, IAC, Scott Rudin and Eli Bush made a deal in March 2019 with Stephen Karam to adapt his play into a feature-length film. Jayne Houdyshell was set to reprise her role from the Broadway production in the film, with Beanie Feldstein, Richard Jenkins, Amy Schumer, and Steven Yeun also cast. In April 2021, Scott Rudin was removed as a producer on the film, following allegations of abuse.

Principal photography began in September 2019, in New York City.

== Release ==
The Humans premiered at the 2021 Toronto International Film Festival on September 12, 2021. The film screened at over 25 film festivals including Austin (Centerpiece screening), Indianapolis (Centerpiece screening), Nashville (Closing Night), Middleburg, San Diego, Philadelphia, Denver, and Savannah. The film was simultaneously released in theaters and aired on Showtime on November 24, 2021.

== Reception ==
On the review aggregator website Rotten Tomatoes, 92% of 140 critics' reviews are positive, with an average rating of 7.5/10. The website's consensus reads: "The Humans takes its Tony-winning source material from stage to screen without sacrificing the essence of writer-director Stephen Karam's dysfunctional drama." Metacritic assigned the film a weighted average score of 78 out of 100 based on 38 critics, indicating "generally favorable" reviews.

The film landed on several 2021 Top 10 lists including Vanity Fair, the Associated Press, The Guardian, Vogue, The Austin Chronicle, RogerEbert.com, The Hollywood Reporter, and Indiewire's list of top first feature films of 2021. The film was selected as a "Critic's Pick" from The New York Times.

=== Awards and nominations ===
Award	Category	Nominee(s)	Result	Ref.
Artios Awards	Low Budget Feature - Comedy or Drama	Ellen Chenoweth, Susanne Scheel	Won	
Chlotrudis Awards	Best Sound Design	Paul Urmson	Nominated	
Independent Spirit Awards	Best Cinematography	Lol Crawley	Nominated	
Gold List	Best Supporting Actor	Steven Yeun	Won	
Indiana Film Journalists Association	Best Ensemble Acting		runner-up	
Indiana Film Journalists Association	Best Supporting Actor	Richard Jenkins	Nominated	
Munich Film Festival	Best Film by an Emerging Director	Stephen Karam	Nominated	
