= Sons of the Prophet =

Play written by Stephen Karam

- Publicity poster for the Roundabout Theatre Company's New York premiere in 2011.
- Original language: English
- Written by: Stephen Karam
- Setting: Nazareth, Pennsylvania

Premiere
- Date: April 1, 2011
- Place: Huntington Theatre Company; Boston, Massachusetts

Sons of the Prophet is a play by Stephen Karam. It is a comedy-drama about a Lebanese-American family and was a finalist for the 2012 Pulitzer Prize for Drama.

== Productions ==
Sons of the Prophet premiered in a production by Huntington Theatre Company in Boston in April and May 2011.

Sons of the Prophet opened Off-Broadway at the Laura Pels Theatre on October 20, 2011 (after previews from September 28) and closed on January 1, 2012. This play was commissioned by the Roundabout Theatre Company. The play was directed by Peter DuBois and starred Charles Socarides (Timothy), Yusef Bulos (Bill), Lizbeth MacKay (Mrs. McAndrew), Dee Nelson (Dr. Manor), Jonathan Louis Dent (Vin), Santino Fontana (Joseph), Chris Perfetti (Charles) and Joanna Gleason (Gloria).

The play was a finalist for the 2012 Pulitzer Prize for Drama. and won the Lucille Lortel Award for Outstanding Play, the New York Drama Critics' Circle Award and the Outer Critics Circle Award for Best Play, 2011-12.

== Plot ==
Brothers Joseph Douaihy (29 years old) and Charles Douaihy (18 years old), who live in a run-down area of Nazareth, Pennsylvania, are left alone after their father dies of a heart attack two weeks after a car accident. That accident was caused by a prank by the local football star, Vin, who is sent to a juvenile detention center as punishment.

Their family has emigrated from Lebanon and is distantly related to Kahlil Gibran. The brothers are forced to not only take care of themselves but care for their aging uncle, Bill. Joseph, who has mysterious pains, goes to work for Gloria, a book-packager, to get health insurance. Gloria tries to convince Joseph to write a book about his family, thinking this will return her to success in the publishing world. Joseph, who is gay, starts a romance with a reporter named Timothy.

The play ends at Vin's trial which is reported on by Timothy. The Douaihy family has chosen to not try to stop Vin from playing football. Which is followed by Vin’s apology and him reciting Gibran’s Prayer to Saint Rafka. The court goes into recess and Timothy asks for photos from the family, where he is then lambasted by Joseph for trying to exploit them. An open mic portion begins and Gloria unexpectedly appears giving an emotional speech empathizing with the Douahiy family, and saying she feels as if she was a part of their family. Gloria then asks Joseph to drive her home in which she yells “Take a fucking taxi!” at her. A video of Joseph yelling at Gloria then goes viral leading to Gloria securing a book deal.

The play uses the device of projections with "a title inspired by the chapter headings in Gibran’s The Prophet."

== Critical response ==
The Variety reviewer (in reviewing the Huntington production) wrote that the play was "wonderfully acted and sensitively helmed production .... Karam demonstrates an original comic voice for young characters, but here he expands generationally."

The New York Times reviewer (of the Off-Broadway production ) wrote that the play is "...absolutely wonderful new comedy-drama ... Written with insight and compassion, not to mention biting wit, it shines a clarifying light into some of life’s darker passages, exploring how people endure the unendurable, and not only survive but also move forward through their blighted lives with sustaining measures of hope, love and good humor. The question of why we suffer is unanswerable, but how we suffer defines our character and shapes our lives more than we care to acknowledge."
