= Stephen Karam =

American playwright and screenwriter

- Born: c. 1980 (age 45–46); Scranton, Pennsylvania, U.S.
- Education: Brown University (BA)
- Occupations: Playwright; director
- Writing career
- Period: 2000–present
- Notable work: Sons of the Prophet; The Humans

Stephen Karam (born c. 1980) is an American playwright, screenwriter and director. His plays Sons of the Prophet, a comedy-drama about a Lebanese-American family, and The Humans were finalists for the Pulitzer Prize for Drama in 2012 and 2016, respectively. The Humans won the 2016 Tony Award for Best Play, and Karam wrote and directed a film adaptation of the play, released in 2021.

== Biography ==
Karam grew up in Scranton, Pennsylvania, in a Lebanese-American family of Maronite Catholic faith. He graduated in 2002 from Brown University, then apprenticed at the Utah Shakespeare Festival.

There he met Arian Moayed (who later appeared in The Humans) and P. J. Paparelli, who collaborated with him on columbinus and directed The Humans in Chicago. Karam teaches at The New School in New York. His plays have appeared both Off-Broadway and on Broadway.

Karam was a three-time winner in The Blank Theatre's Nationwide Young Playwrights Festival in 1997, 1998 and 1999. His first play A Work of Art ('97) starred Robert Pine and Janet Carroll, Agnes ('98) starred Alyson Hannigan in her stage debut, and Lies in the Eye of the Beholder ('99) starred Richard Ruccollo.

His musical Emma won the Kennedy Center American College Theater (KCACTF) Musical Theatre Award in 2001.

The Roundabout Theatre Company produced Speech & Debate in October 2007 at The Black Box, after a workshop at Brown/Trinity Playwrights Repertory Theatre in Providence, Rhode Island in 2006. This play was the first at Roundabout Underground, their "initiative to introduce and cultivate artists."

columbinus was produced Off-Broadway in 2006 at the New York Theatre Workshop, following co-premieres in 2005 at the Round House Theatre in Silver Spring, Maryland and at Perseverance Theatre in Juneau, Alaska.

Sons of the Prophet was produced in 2011 at the Roundabout Theatre Company's Laura Pels Theatre. The play was a finalist for the 2012 Pulitzer Prize for Drama and winner of the New York Drama Critics' Circle, Outer Critics Circle and Lucille Lortel Awards for Best Play.

Dark Sisters is a chamber opera, with the libretto written by Karam and the music composed by Nico Muhly, commissioned by the Gotham Chamber Opera, Music-Theatre Group, and the Opera Company of Philadelphia. The opera premiered at the Gerald W. Lynch Theater at John Jay College in November 2011, directed by Rebecca Taichman and conducted by Neal Goren.

Karam is the Writer in Residence at the 2016 National Playwrights Conference at the Eugene O’Neill Theater Center in Waterford, Connecticut.

Karam prepared an adaptation of The Cherry Orchard by Anton Chekhov, which was presented on Broadway by the Roundabout Theatre in a limited engagement at the American Airlines Theatre from September 15, 2016 (previews), officially on October 16 to December 4. Directed by Simon Godwin, Diane Lane stars as Lyubov Ranevskaya, with Joel Grey (Firs), John Glover (Gaev), Celia Keenan-Bolger (Varya), Harold Perrineau (Lopakhin) and Tavi Gevinson (Anya).

=== The Humans ===
The Humans was Karam's second commission from the Roundabout Theatre; the first was for Sons of the Prophet. The play had its world premiere at the American Theater Company, Chicago, in November 2014, directed by PJ Paparelli.

The Humans ran on Broadway, opening at the Helen Hayes Theatre on February 18, 2016. It premiered Off-Broadway in a Roundabout Theatre Company production at the Laura Pels Theatre on October 25, 2015, and closed on January 3, 2016.

The Humans was a finalist for the 2016 Pulitzer Prize for Drama, 2016 Obie Award for Playwriting, and won the 2016 Tony Award for Best Play.

== Style ==
According to Alexis Soloski of The New York Times, "Mr. Karam specializes in painful comedies that really shouldn’t be as funny as they are. In Speech & Debate, which centers on three misfit teenagers, at least two characters have undergone traumatic sexual experiences.... In The Humans, an Irish-American family’s Thanksgiving dinner is dotted with chatter of depression, dementia, illness and the specter of Sept. 11. This, too, is a comedy. At least in part. It is also possibly a horror story." He writes about loss "and the messy, haphazard, necessary ways we get on with our lives afterward."

In an article about Karam, Charles Haugland, Artistic Programs & Dramaturgy at Boston's Tony Award-winning Huntington Theatre Company, wrote: "Karam has an uncanny knack for echoing American culture in ways that amuse and compel audiences equally... Karam's humor is notable, and he can be funny in remarkably few words... he is quick to note that he starts his plays with the basics: character and plot."

Peter Marks, writing in The Washington Post observed: "Through pieces like Speech and Debate, which explored teenage relationships and the questionable morals of a teacher, and Sons of the Prophet, about the travails of a pair of brothers living hand-to-mouth in a small Pennsylvania town, Karam has demonstrated an acute perceptiveness for the ways people lean on one another even as they get under each other’s skins.... Karam says he’s drawn to 'the strangeness in people' who live in a state of dread; it’s the psychological realism of the everyday, it seems, that fires his imagination."

== Plays ==
- The Cherry Orchard, adapted (2016)
- The Humans (2014)
- Sons of the Prophet (2011)
- Dark Sisters (2011)
- Speech & Debate (2006)
- columbinus (2005)
- Girl on Girl (2005)
- Emma (2000)

== Filmography ==
- Speech & Debate (2017, screenwriter)
- The Seagull (2018, screenwriter)
- The Humans (2021, screenwriter, director)

== Awards and honors ==
- 2012 New York Drama Critics' Circle Award for Sons of the Prophet
- 2012 Outer Critics' Circle Award for Sons of the Prophet
- 2012 Drama Desk Award for Sons of the Prophet
- 2012 Lucille Lortel Awards for Sons of the Prophet
- 2012 Pulitzer Prize Finalist for Sons of the Prophet
- 2016 New York Drama Critics' Circle Award for The Humans
- 2016 Drama Desk Award for The Humans
- 2016 Drama League Award for The Humans
- 2016 Obie Award for The Humans
- 2016 Pulitzer Prize Finalist for The Humans
- 2016 Tony Award for Best Play for The Humans

Karam received the Berwin Lee Playwrights Award in 2015, which includes a $25,000 award as a commission.

He is a MacDowell Colony fellow.

He received the inaugural Sam Norkin Off-Broadway Drama Desk Award for Sons of the Prophet.

Karam received the Horton Foote Playwriting Award, awarded by the Dramatists Guild, in February 2016. The award has a $25,000 cash prize.
