= Columbinus =

Play written by Stephen Karam

Columbinus (stylized in all lowercase) is a play written by Stephen Karam and PJ Paparelli, with contributions by Josh Barrett, Sean McNall, Karl Miller, Michael Milligan and Will Rogers, created by the United States Theatre Project. The play looks at issues of alienation, hostility and social pressure in high schools and was suggested by the April 1999 massacre at Columbine High School in Jefferson County, Colorado. The play premiered in Silver Spring, Maryland in 2005 and then Off-Broadway in 2006.

== Plot ==
Columbinus includes excerpts from discussions with parents, survivors and community leaders in Littleton as well as diaries and home video footage to reveal what it refers to as "the dark recesses of American adolescence".

The first act of the play is set in a stereotypical, fictional American high school and follows the lives and struggles of eight teenage archetypes. These characters are not given names but labels, and the two outcast friends designated in the script as "Freak" and "Loner" are slowly driven to crime and madness by the bullying from their classmates. In the first scene of act two, these boys become Eric Harris and Dylan Klebold when the actors playing Freak and Loner, respectively, approach two tables with objects relating to the massacre and change into replicas of the clothing the perpetrators wore; the perpetrators' senior photos are projected on a screen behind them. The scenes following this are taken from the perpetrators' videos and personal journals, illustrating the days approaching and including the shootings and the suspects' suicides.

The newly added act three has the other cast members become survivors and townspeople who reflect on the events, including the cover up of information surrounding the suspects. The play briefly touches on modern shootings such as the incidents at Aurora or Newtown. A few productions have included a brief scene discussing the story of the Columbine survivor who wrote to Mike Judge about "Wings of the Dope," an episode of King of the Hill which she credited with enabling her to grieve a boy she never got to tell she loved, who turned out to be one of the perpetrators (resulting in her being pressured to repress her grief).

== Characters ==
- Loner – Geek in the school who is picked on by his peers and neglected by his parents. Has a romantic fascination with Rebel, who views him as "not her first choice. Maybe not anyone's." In the Second Act, embodies Dylan Klebold.
- Freak – An underdog with a chip on his shoulder and a chest deformity. He is ridiculed by his classmates, with the exception of AP, whom he detests. His father is an ex-military general who is overly hard on him. In the Second Act, embodies Eric Harris.
- AP (Advanced Placement) – The play's representation of pure kindness and good-heartedness. He is extremely intelligent, but fantasizes about having good looks, popularity, and athletic ability, which he can never have due to a life-threatening illness. He reaches out to the other students, and is a secret friend to most of them. He is the only character who the killers set free at the shootings.
- Rebel – Artistic and rough-talking teenager who finds a sort of kinship with Loner. She thinks AP is nice, but that he is too pure-hearted and a "loser" for her taste. She denies rumors that she is goth or a druggie, but is seen making cuts into her arm in the First Act.
- Faith – Has a passion for Biblical studies, which is often her downfall when trying to make friends. Is briefly the object of Freak's affection. She is well-liked by many people, but her virginal way of thinking is often made fun of.
- Perfect – The most popular girl in school, though many people find her to be snobby and fake. It appears that she has no problems with her life at all. However, it is revealed that her mother is a school bus driver, and is struggling to make ends meet. Perfect also reveals that she is pregnant.
- Prep – Standard school bully, who is popular because of who his friends are. He has an unreturned romantic interest in Jock.
- Jock – Popular and amiable school hero. He is athletic, popular, and extremely attractive. As a hard-working student in school, he finds it irritating that the terms "Brainless" and "Jock" are so often put together.

== Production history ==
Columbinus had a reading at the Arena Stage, Washington, DC in April 2003. Members of the United States Theatre Project had started working on the play in July 2002, and the play had a workshop at the North Carolina School of the Arts in December 2002. The title of the play (which is in lowercase) is Latin for columbine, a flower.

Columbinus had its co-world premiere on March 8, 2005, at the Round House Theatre in Silver Spring, Maryland and then from May 6, 2005 to May 29, at Perseverance Theatre in Juneau, Alaska (where the co-author and creator, PJ Paparelli, was the Artistic Director), in conjunction with the United States Theatre Project.

The cast consists of five men and three women, including extensive doubling up with characters in brief roles as parents, teachers, guidance counselors, and other adults.

The cast of the Round House production:

- Anne Bowles, Faith
- Jeanne Dillon, Perfect
- James Flanagan, AP
- Daniel Frith, Prep
- Gene Gillette, Jock
- Karl Miller, Freak/Eric Harris
- Ekatrina Oleksa, Rebel
- Will Rogers, Loner/Dylan Klebold

Columbinus had its Off-Broadway premiere at the New York Theatre Workshop on May 22, 2006 (previews from May 5) and closed on June 11. The production was directed by PJ Paparelli.

The Off-Broadway cast:

- Anna Camp, Perfect
- James Flanagan, AP
- Carmen Herlihy, Rebel
- Nicole Lowrance, Faith
- Karl Miller, Freak/Eric Harris
- Joaquin Perez-Campbell, Jock
- Will Rogers, Loner/Dylan Klebold
- Bobby Steggert, Prep

=== Other productions ===
In fall 2009, Paparelli workshopped new text for the show, premiering a new version at Truman State University in Kirksville, Missouri in honor of the tenth anniversary of the Columbine shooting. The production was directed by Theatre Department Faculty member David Charles Goyette.

The cast:

- Joanna Bess, Faith
- Kylee Raney, Perfect
- Ryan Clark, AP
- Cherish Varley, Rebel
- Cameron Jones, Prep
- Andrew Stashefsky, Jock
- Jake Wasson, Freak/Eric Harris
- Sam Kyker, Loner/Dylan Klebold

A revised version was presented at the American Theater Company, Chicago, Illinois in February 2013, directed by PJ Paparelli. The revision includes "material from recent interviews with survivors of the Columbine High School shootings, families of victims and residents of Littleton, Colorado."

== Critical response ==
When Columbinus premiered in 2005 at the Round House Theatre, Peter Marks of The Washington Post called it "An ambitious examination of the suburbanization of evil, directed with a surefire sense of theatricality by PJ Paparelli." Marks noted that "The script, by a writing team headed by Paparelli... is heavily based on research. (Stephen Karam and Sean McNall are credited as co-writers.) The words of Harris and Klebold, as well as court records, statements of Columbine witnesses and interviews with high school students across the country are incorporated into the proceedings. Other conversations are invented."

The Variety reviewer (of the Off-Broadway production) wrote: "While the first act overdoes the buildup, act two has Miller and Rogers manfully shouldering their complicated characters and delivering the goods on their tormented inner lives. Here, scribes Karam and Paparelli drop the universal material of teen angst garnered from interviews in favor of words drawn from the private diaries, emails and videotapes that go a long way in exploring the twisted thinking behind the shootings... the production is especially well served by the wall of sound created by Martin Desjardins to suggest the demonic thoughts ricocheting in the boys' brains as they bought guns, made bombs, dressed to kill and worked themselves into a homicidal frame of mind by obsessing on their grievances as social outcasts."

Reviewing the off-Broadway production, Charles Isherwood wrote in The New York Times: "Mr. Karam and Mr. Paparelli have captured authentic notes of adolescent anxiety and yearning in briskly drawn scenes set in and around the classroom, the gym and the cafeteria. The dialogue is occasionally enlivened by a sharp jab of wit ... Much of it is also depressing or disturbing. And when the focus shrinks to the actual killings, and the dialogue is drawn from the testimony of the survivors of the rampage, the play becomes more upsetting still... ultimately don't offer any illuminating new views of the tangle of psychological and cultural factors behind it (including, of course, the easy availability of guns)."

== Awards and nominations ==
Columbinus received Helen Hayes Award nominations including:

- The Charles MacArthur Award for Outstanding New Play or Musical
- Outstanding Resident Play
- Outstanding Director - Resident Play
- Outstanding Sound Design - Resident Play or Musical (Martin Desjardins) (for which it won)

Columbinus received two Lucille Lortel Award nominations, for Outstanding Director and Outstanding Sound Design (winner).

== See also ==
- Eric Harris and Dylan Klebold
- Columbine High School Massacre
