= Lisa Kron =

American actress and playwright (born 1961)

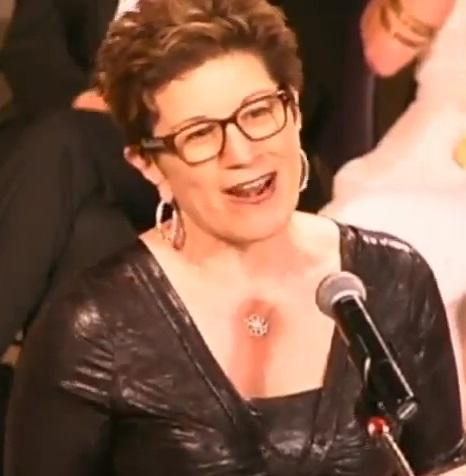
- Kron hosting the Sixth Annual Lilly Awards in 2015
- Born: May 20, 1961 (age 65); Ann Arbor, Michigan, U.S.
- Occupations: Actress, playwright
- Spouse: Madeleine George
- Website: www.lisakron.org

Elizabeth S. "Lisa" Kron (born May 20, 1961) is an American actress and playwright. She is best known for writing the lyrics and book for the musical Fun Home, for which she won both the Tony Award for Best Original Score and the Tony Award for Best Book of a Musical. Fun Home was also awarded the Tony Award for Best Musical in 2015 and the 2014 Obie Award for writing for musical theater.

== Early life ==
Kron was born in Ann Arbor, Michigan. She jokes in one of her plays that her life began on her parents' trip to Europe: "I was conceived in Venice, you know. (Well, not actually in Venice, but in the nearby town of Mestra where hotels are a lot cheaper.)"

Her mother is Ann Kron, born in 1932, a former antiques dealer and community activist. In the 1960s she founded the Westside Neighborhood Organization in Lansing, Michigan. In a time when neighborhood segregation was the norm, the WNO helped to bring people from diverse racial and socioeconomic backgrounds together. Ann converted to Judaism when she married Lisa's father.

Her father is Walter Kron, a retired lawyer born in Germany in 1922. He was born to a Jewish family, and is a Holocaust survivor. In 1937 as the Nazi persecution of the Jews escalated, his parents sent him out of Germany via the Kindertransport program. He went back to Germany after World War II, serving as a US army interrogator of Nazi war criminals. In the 1990s Kron and her father visited Auschwitz, where he believed his parents were murdered by the Nazis in the 1940s. She later found out that her father's parents were actually killed in Chelmno.

Her brother is David Kron, born in 1963. He is a sound engineer and is married with a son. He says of his sister: "She is very funny, with a very sharp wit...And she always had her own way of looking at things."

In her play Well Kron says that she felt like an outsider even in her own family because she, her parents and her brother David were the only Jews. Her maternal family is Christian and none of her Jewish paternal family survived the Holocaust. Her play 2.5 Minute Ride describes this contradiction as she recalls her mother asking her to come home for the holidays: "...she asks me every year, 'Are you going to make it home for Christmas this year?' And I say ' I don't come home for Christmas Mom. I have never come home for Christmas. We are not Christians. Stop trying to trick me!"

Kron's family moved to Lansing, Michigan in 1965. One of the main story lines in her play Well recounts her experiences attending a predominantly African American elementary school in that city. Kron's parents sent her to the school in an effort to help integrate it. Lansing began mandatory racial integration in its schools three years later.

Kron became interested in theatre at an early age. She traces her acting roots to the Purim plays that she performed as a child at her synagogue in Lansing. In junior high she was determined to be the funniest girl that people knew. "Her avenue for that was telling humorous stories, something that everyone in her family did…"

She graduated from Everett High School as a valedictorian in 1979. In her senior year she attended special theater classes at Lansing School District's Academic Interest Center. An early mentor was her theater teacher at the Center, the late Robert L. Burpee.

She attended Kalamazoo College, where she majored in theatre. At Kalamazoo College theater professor Lowry Marshall mentored her and helped her land a role with a national touring theater company.

She furthered her studies at Chautauqua Professional Actors Studio and the British European Studies Group in London.

== Major works ==
Kron's major works to date are 2.5 Minute Ride, Well, and Fun Home. The first two are critically acclaimed autobiographical plays, and the third a critically acclaimed biographical musical. 2.5 Minute Ride blends a trip she took with her father Walter to Auschwitz, the scene of his parents' extermination by the Nazis and her family's annual trip to an amusement park in Ohio. Kron says in the introduction to her play: "Humor and horror are juxtaposed and you might not know for a second whether you are at Auschwitz or at the amusement park. The show does not tell you when to laugh and when to be solemn. The response is up to you."

The play recounts her father's remarkable experiences: "When my father… heard that his parents had been sent to Auschwitz, he immediately tried to order a ham sandwich, to distance himself from Judaism. But he couldn't. He'd say to the waitress, 'Um . . . tuna fish.'" Kron also reflects on looking at a poem on exhibit during their trip to Auschwitz: "I repeat the words that have undone me. 'People burn people here.'" One of the most memorable scenes in the play is when her father tells her about the death of her grandparents at Auschwitz:

... I don't think I accepted it until a few years ago, in Lansing. It was the winter and it was so cold and I was shivering…And I realized this would only happen to them once. They were old and they stood outside, lined up in the cold and they were of no use to anyone and they were killed ...

Well explores her mother Ann's experiences with social activism and illness, The play uses physical illness as a metaphor for social "illnesses" such as racism. Kron's description of Well: "A multicharacter theatrical exploration of issues of health and illness both in the individual and in a community." Kron describes her mother:

My mother is a fantastically energetic person trapped in an utterly exhausted body…when she has a burst of energy it's awe inspiring. For instance, when we were very young she decided she wanted my brother and me to be raised in a racially integrated neighborhood, and then she set about to create one.

Fun Home (2013) was Kron's first musical and first work based on an existing work by another artist. Alison Bechdel's acclaimed graphic novel/memoir Fun Home serves as the basis for the musical. Kron wrote the book and lyrics, and Tony-nominated composer Jeanine Tesori wrote the score. It looks at the experience of cartoonist Bechdel growing up in small-town Pennsylvania as the not-yet-out lesbian daughter of a closeted gay man. All of Kron's previous works have been based on her own experiences. She discussed the process of adapting another person's work in an interview for GLAAD.

The thing about adaptation is you have to re-originate a thing. You can't just say, "This is a musicalized version of this graphic novel." It has to have its own originating impulse, so that you feel like the experience you are having is the primary experience. And at the same time, you don't feel like you're watching a different thing, that whatever the effect of the book was, you'll feel like it's represented.

All three works have been very well received, 2.5 Minute Ride, directed by Mark Brokaw, won an Obie award among others. Well was anthologized in Best Plays of 2003–2004, listed among the year's best plays by the New York Times and received two Tony Award nominations. Ben Brantley says of 2.5 Minute Ride: "(it)… puts Ms. Kron on a level with sterling monologists like Spalding Gray, autobiographers who combine novelistic complexity with stage-smart impudence." Michael Sommers says of Well: "Truly a beautiful play in many ways, Well paints a mother-and-daughter picture of rich, unusual artistry." Of Kron's recent work, Fun Home, The New York Times' Ben Brantley said it is "a beautiful heartbreaker of a musical," and that "Ms. Kron has already established herself as a vibrant family memoirist with her plays 2.5 Minute Ride and Well, and her book and resonantly precise lyrics give this show its essential spine."

The first college performance of Well occurred in the winter of 2008 at Kalamazoo College, Kron's alma mater. It starred a group of students as well as local professional actress Sharon Williams. Kron traveled to Kalamazoo for the week of the run, participating in "Lisa Kron Week in Kalamazoo" which, besides Well, included a performance of the Five Lesbian Brothers' "The Secretaries" as well as a public reading in which she read excerpts from all three of her works in addition to one of the pieces she is currently working on.

The world premiere of Kron's play In the Wake opened at the Kirk Douglas Theatre in Los Angeles on March 28, 2010. Leigh Silverman (who also directed Well) directed. The play is about a family gathering set just after the presidential election of 2000. The main protagonist Ellen deals with the political turmoil as well as upheaval in her personal life. Charlotte Stoudt describes In the Wake: "Kron's comedy of deprecation and provocative social critique is part Sedaris, part Kushner, yet utterly her own."

== Career in theatre ==
Kron's works are humorous and poignant looks at life by someone who has often described herself an outsider. Her experiences as a Jewish woman living in a predominantly Christian Midwestern city or life as a lesbian working in traditional theatre provide rich material for her plays. Her reflections from the outside looking in are insightful but not bitter. The critic Ben Brantley says of her: "…there is never condescension in her humor. It is simply a crucial part of her navigational equipment in finding her way through life's absurd course of non sequiturs."

She describes her creative process in her usual humorous and self-deprecating way: "I wish I had more of a technique for constructing these things. I keep banging my head against the wall until it pops through on the other side…"

She arrived in New York City in 1984. She worked as an office temp and various other jobs while pursuing an acting career. Some of her adventures during her early days in New York are chronicled in her play 101 Humiliating Stories. She was soon performing at the WOW Café, a creative venue for women in the performing arts in the East Village, Manhattan.

In 1989 Kron, Maureen Angelos, Dominique Dibbell, Peg Healey and Babs Davy founded the theater company The Five Lesbian Brothers. The group writes and performs witty satiric works from a feminist and lesbian perspective. "Five Lesbian Brothers was chosen, in part, to refute the perception of lesbian theatre as combative and didactic." Their plays have been produced by the New York Theatre Workshop, the Public Theater, the WOW Café Theatre and others. The Brothers have also toured all over the United States. The Brothers have won the Obie Award as well as other awards and have published The Five Lesbian Brothers' Guide to Life and Five Lesbian Brothers Four Plays.

She also would star in Paul Rudnick's 1998 play The Most Fabulous Story Ever Told playing a multitude of characters, one of her most memorable, according to Ben Brantley, was as Rabbi Sharon, a lesbian wheelchair-using rabbi.

Kron developed stories about her family into autobiographical plays and performed them in New York and London. Her work was critically well received. New York Times critic Ben Brantley said in his review: "…Fans of that beleaguered literary form, the memoir, can breathe a little more easily this morning. Kron's sparkling autobiographical play Well has arrived on Broadway…to restore the honor of a genre that was slipping into disgrace... Well opened on Broadway March 10, 2006, to critical acclaim and received two Tony nominations. Kron was nominated for Actress in a Play and Jayne Houdyshell was nominated for Featured Actress in a Play. In spite of good reviews, Well had low attendance and closed on May 14, 2006. It has since been performed in Boston in 2007.

While Kron's musical Fun Home was having its premiere run at The Public Theater, Kron was simultaneously performing in a production of Good Person of Szechwan at the same theater. Kron's unusual experience of working on the final touches of one play as a writer while rehearsing to act in another was discussed in a New York Times article "A Quick Trip From Playwright to Player, Lisa Kron Juggles Two Shows at Public Theater."

Kron received the 27th Annual Kleban Prize in 2017 for the most promising musical theatre librettist; the award includes a $100,000 prize.

On June 16, 2025, it was announced that Kron would play Dorine alongside Matthew Broderick, Francis Jue, Amber Gray, and Bianca Del Rio in a new production of Tartuffe at the New York Theatre Workshop.

== Personal life ==
Kron has lived in New York City since 1984 and is a full-time actress. She also teaches playwriting part-time at Yale University and New York University. She is married to fellow Pulitzer Prize-nominated playwright Madeleine George. She is a lesbian.

== Acting credits ==
=== Selected theatre performances ===
Date	Title	Venue	Notes
1989–1991	All My Hopes and Dreams	Performance Space 122	
1990	Voyage to Lesbos	WOW Café	
1991	Brave Smiles	WOW Café	
1991	Facing Life's Problems	Performance Space 122	
1993–1995	101 Humiliating Stories	Performance Space 122; Serious Fun! at Lincoln Center	
1994	The Secretaries	Theatre Rhinoceros, New York Theatre Workshop	
1996	Brides of the Moon	Theatre Rhinoceros, New York Theatre Workshop	
1996	2.5 Minute Ride	La Jolla Playhouse	Premiere
1998	2.5 Minute Ride	Barbican Theatre	
1998	2.5 Minute Ride	American Repertory Theater	
1999	2.5 Minute Ride	The Public Theater	
2004	Well	The Public Theater	
2006	Well	Longacre Theatre	
2006	2.5 Minute Ride	Anchorage	
2007	Well	Huntington Theatre Company	
October 2007	Spain	MCC Theater	
April 2008	Time is the Mercy of Eternity	West End Theatre (Manhattan)	
May 2010	In the Wake	Berkeley Repertory Theatre	Premiere
October 2013	Fun Home	The Public Theater	Premiere
2015	Fun Home	Circle in the Square Theatre	
2025	Tartuffe	New York Theatre Workshop	

=== Television and film performances ===
- Cater-Waiter 1996
- Law & Order: "Atonement" 1996 CSU Warren
- Law & Order: "Trophy" 1996 CSU Warren
- Law & Order: "Disciple" 1999 CSU Technician Andrews
- Strong Medicine: "Family History" 2002 Nooch
- Stay 2005 Paramedic #2
- Deception 2008 Receptionist
- Sex and the City 2008 Junior's Waitress

== Selected publications ==
=== Plays ===
- The Five Lesbian Brothers' Guide to Life by the Five Lesbian Brothers, New York: Simon & Schuster, 1997. ISBN 978-0-684-81384-4
- Oedipus at Palm Springs – a "Five Lesbian Brothers play" with Maureen Angelos, Dominique Dibbell and Peg Healey (2010). Samuel French. ISBN 978-0-573-69702-9
- 2.5 Minute Ride and 101 Humiliating Stories, New York : Theatre Communications Group, 2001. ISBN 978-1-55936-181-1
- Voyage to Lesbos in Five Lesbian Brothers Four Plays, New York : Theatre Communications Group, 2000. ISBN 1-55936-166-2
- Well, New York: Theatre Communications Group, 2006. ISBN 978-1-55936-253-5

=== Anthologies ===
- Brave Smiles by the Five Lesbian Brothers, The Actor's Book of Gay and Lesbian Plays, Eric Lane and Nina Shengold, eds. New York: Penguin, 1995 ISBN 978-0-14-024552-3
- Cast Out: Queer Lives In Theater Ann Arbor : University of Michigan Press 2006 ISBN 978-0-472-09933-7
- Extreme Exposure: An Anthology of Solo Performance Texts from the Twentieth Century New York: Theatre Communications Group 2000 ISBN 1-55936-155-7
- Out Of Character: Rants, Raves, And Monologues From Today's Top Performance Artists New York : Bantam Books 1997 ISBN 0-553-37485-0, ISBN 978-0-553-37485-8
- 2.5 Minute Ride in Talk to Me: Monologue Plays New York : Vintage Books 2004 ISBN 978-1-4000-7615-4
- Voyage to Lesbos in Five Lesbian Brothers Four Plays New York : Theatre Communications Group, 2000 ISBN 1-55936-166-2
- Well in The Best Plays Theater Yearbook 2003-2004 New York : Limelight Editions, c2005. ISBN 978-0-87910-315-6

=== Articles ===
"Lithe I'm Not. And Trained I'm Not. But I Danced." The New York Times, December 12, 1999.

=== Audiobooks ===
2.5 Minute Ride [ABRIDGED] (Audio CD) New Millennium Audio; Abridged edition 2001 ISBN 978-1-931056-25-0

== Awards and fellowships ==
=== 2.5 Minute Ride ===
- Los Angeles Dramalogue Award
- Obie Award
- 2000 GLAAD Media Award

=== Well ===
- Listed among the year's best plays by the New York Times, the Associated Press, the Newark Star Ledger, Backstage and the Advocate
- Part of the 2004 Sundance Institute Theatre Lab

=== Fun Home ===
- 2014 Pulitzer Prize finalist for Fun Home
- 2014 Obie Award for Fun Home
- 2015 Tony Award for Best Original Score (shared with Jeanine Tesori, making them the first female writing team to win that award)
- 2015 Tony Award for Best Book of a Musical

=== Other ===
- 1993 New York Dance and Performance Award Bessie Awards with The Five Lesbian Brothers
- 1994 Robert Chesley Gay and Lesbian Playwriting Award
- 1994 New York Foundation for the Arts fellowship in playwriting
- 1995 Obie Award for The Secretaries with The Five Lesbian Brothers
- 1997 Cal Arts/Alpert Award
- 2000 Creative Capital Foundation Grant
- 2000 NEA/TCG Theatre Residency Program for Playwrights
- 2000 NEA/TCG playwriting fellowship
- 2003 Distinguished Alumni Achievement Award, Kalamazoo College
- 2004 New York Foundation for the Arts grant
- 2005 Guggenheim Fellowship
- 2007 The Lucille Lortel Foundation Playwrighting Fellowship
- 2008 Chosen to participate in the 2008 Sundance Institute Theatre Lab
- 2008 Lark Play Development Center Fellowship
- 2011 Lilly Award for In the Wake
- 2017 Edward Kleban Prize for most promising musical theatre librettist

== Awards nominated ==
=== 101 Humiliating Stories ===
- Drama Desk nomination in solo performance

=== 2.5 Minute Ride ===
- Outer Critics Circle Award
- L.A. Drama-Logue Award
- Drama Desk nomination in solo performance
- Outer Critics Circle nomination in solo performance
- 1999 New York Press Award for Best Autobiographical Solo Show

=== Well ===
- Tony Award for Best Actress in a Play
- Tony Award for Best Best Featured Actress in a Play
- 2004 Drama League Nomination
- 2004 Outer Critics Circle Best Play nomination

=== Other ===
- 1994 Nomination for Drama Desk Award in Solo Performance

== Quotes ==
"Bizarre Murder!! Lesbian Forces Blind Holocaust Victim on Roller Coaster!" - 2.5 Minute Ride And 101 Humiliating Stories

"…Judaism, you know, is viewed in the Midwest as kind of an accessory that you wear on top of your Christianity." - Well

"I come from a family with a deep distrust of the body. I believe my family would have their bodies surgically removed from their heads if they could figure out a way to still get to the mall." - "Lithe I'm Not. And Trained I'm Not. But I Danced."
