= Bucks County Playhouse =

Theater in New Hope, Pennsylvania

Coordinates: 40.3623°N 74.9502°W

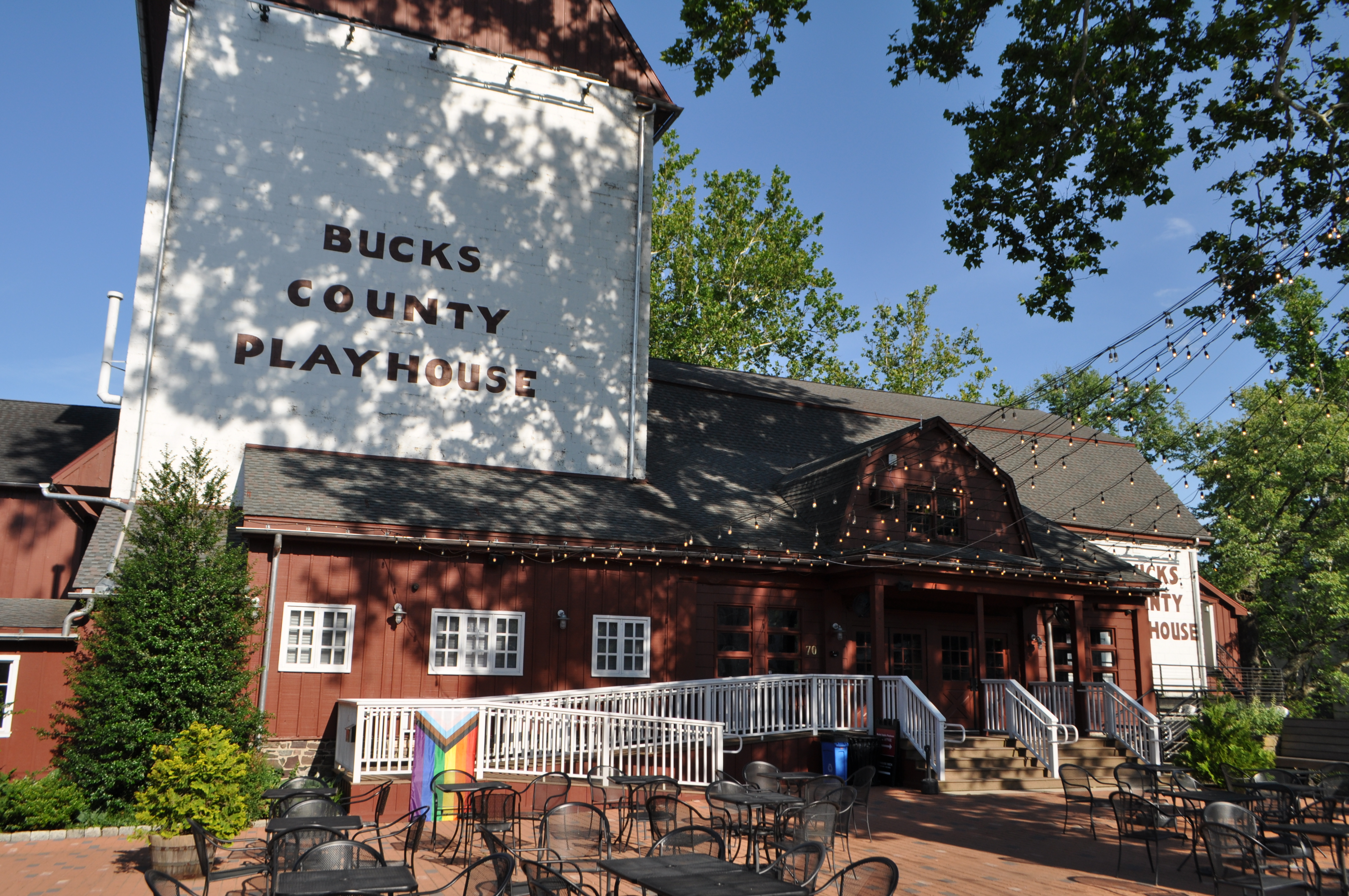
- Bucks County Playhouse in June 2024
- Interactive map of Bucks County Playhouse
- Address: 70 S Main St; New Hope, Pennsylvania

Construction
- Opened: July 1, 1939

Website
- bcptheater.org

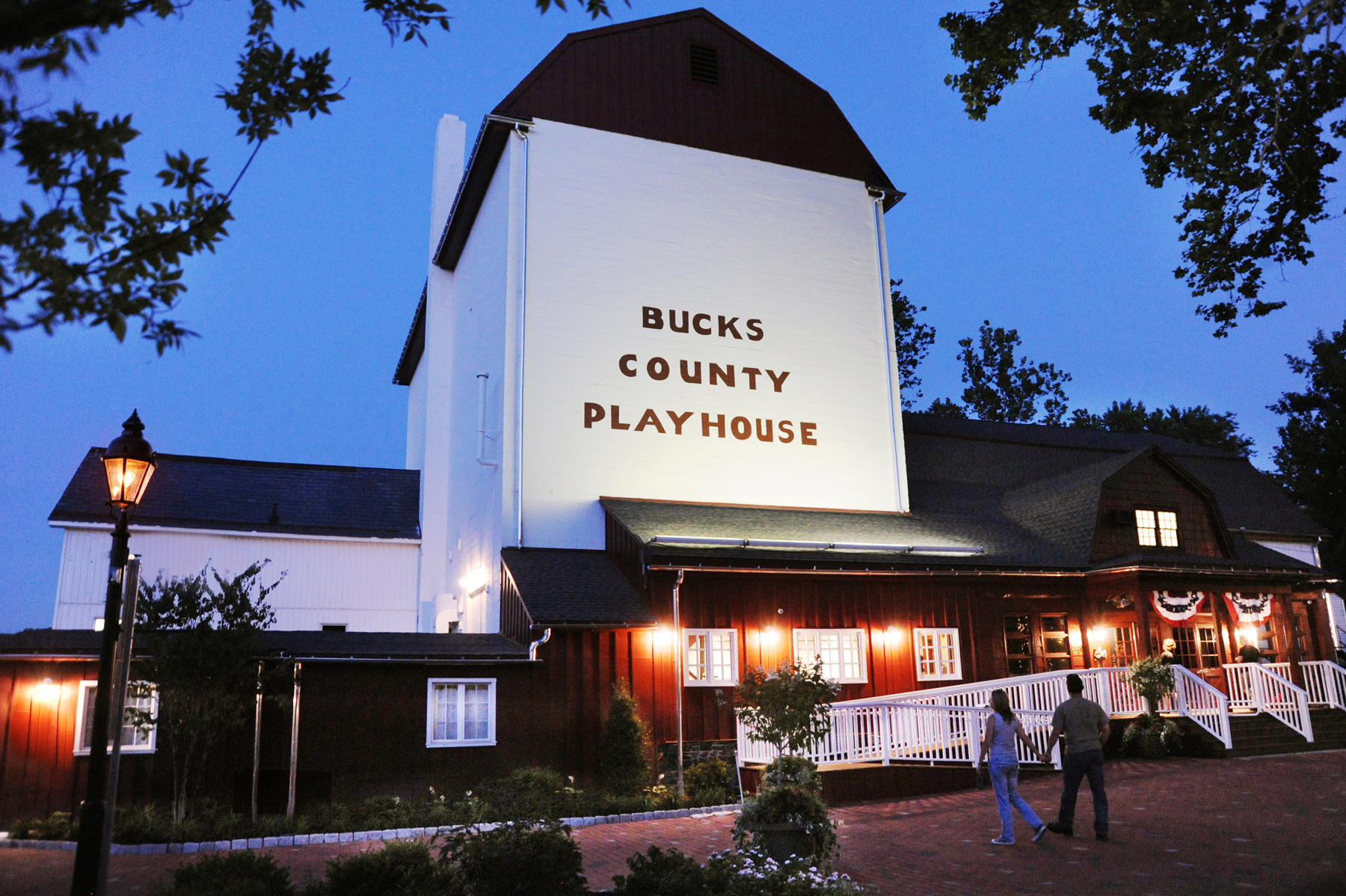
Opening Night at the Bucks County Playhouse July 2012

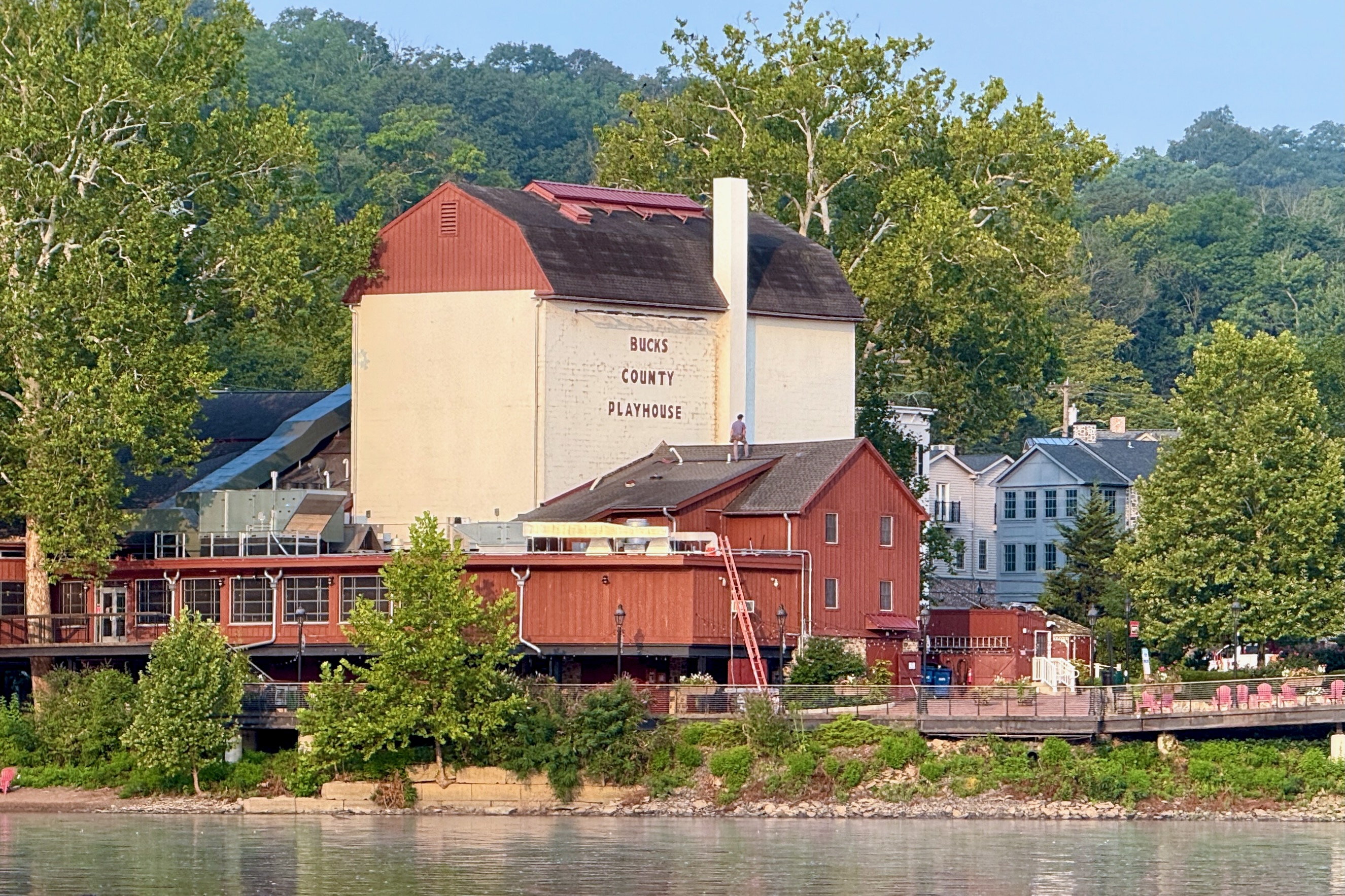
View from the river side in 2025

The Bucks County Playhouse is located in New Hope, Pennsylvania.

When the Hope Mills burned in 1790, Benjamin Parry rebuilt the grist mills as the New Hope Mills. The town was renamed for the mills.

Bucks County Playhouse, 1934

The building was saved from demolition in the 1930s. It was purchased and run by a group of people including playwrights Moss Hart and Kenyon Nicholson. Renovations converting the building into a theater began in 1938. The first production at the new Bucks County Playhouse was Springtime for Henry featuring Edward Everett Horton. It opened on July 1, 1939.

The Bucks County Playhouse became a summer theater. It was the starting point for many actors and became a place where plays slated for Broadway were tried out. Neil Simon's Barefoot in the Park, starring Robert Redford and Elizabeth Ashley, had its premiere at the theater in 1963.

The Bucks County Playhouse Conservancy, a public/private partnership, raised sufficient funds to regain the property following a 2010 foreclosure. Following an extensive renovation, the theater reopened on July 2, 2012.
