= List of awards and nominations received by Mel Brooks =

Mel Brooks awards and nominations
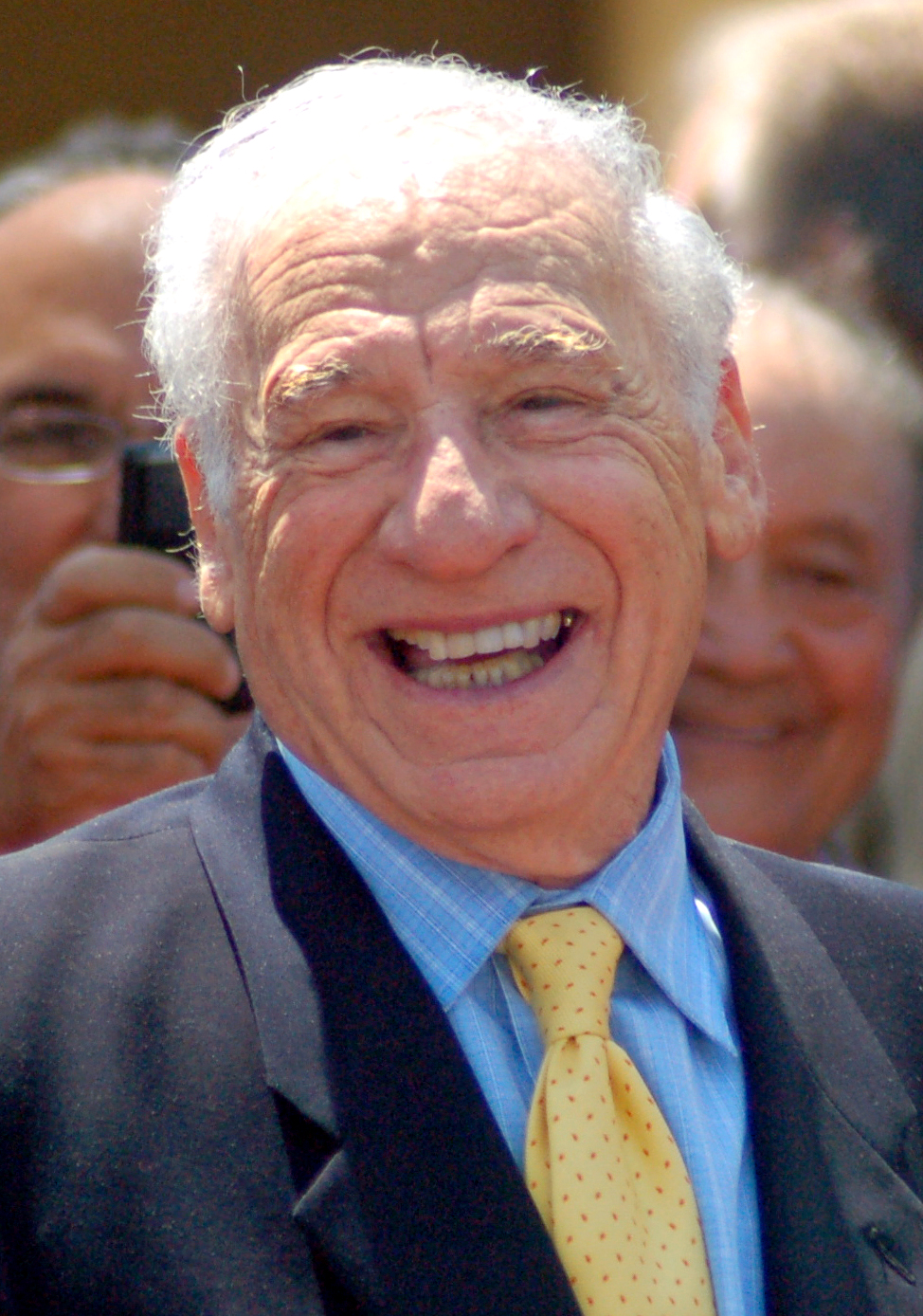
- Brooks receiving a star on the Hollywood Walk of Fame in 2010
Awards and nominations
Award	Wins	Nominations
Academy Awards	1	3
BAFTA Awards	0	1
Emmy Awards	4	15
Drama Desk Awards	3	4
Golden Globes	0	6
Grammy Awards	3	10
Laurence Olivier Awards	1	1
Tony Awards	3	3
WGA Awards	2	6
Other	10	13

Totals (Note: Certain award groups do not simply award one winner. They acknowledge several different recipients, have runners-up, and have third place. Since this is a specific recognition and is different from losing an award, runner-up mentions are considered wins in this award tally. For simplification and to avoid errors, each award in this list has been presumed to have had a prior nomination.)
- Wins: 27
- Nominations: 62

The following is a list of awards and nominations received by Mel Brooks.

Mel Brooks is an American actor, writer, director, producer, comedian, and composer. Over his 70 year career in film, theatre, and television Brooks has won an Academy Award (plus an Academy Honorary Award), four Emmy Awards, three Tony Awards, three Grammy Awards, and has been nominated for six Golden Globe Awards and one BAFTA Award. With his Tony wins for The Producers in 2001, he became one of only eight people (now 21) who have won an Emmy, Grammy, Oscar and Tony Award. Additionally, he has received a Kennedy Center Honor in 2009, a Hollywood Walk of Fame star in 2010, the 41st AFI Life Achievement Award in 2013, a British Film Institute Fellowship in 2015, a National Medal of Arts in 2016, and a BAFTA Fellowship in 2017.

Brooks won the Academy Award for Best Original Screenplay for his satirical black comedy film The Producers (1967) and was nominated for the Academy Award for Best Adapted Screenplay for the comedy horror film Young Frankenstein (1974) and Best Original Song for the title theme to Western comedy film Blazing Saddles (1974). He was nominated for the BAFTA Award for Best Screenplay for Blazing Saddles. Brooks has received six competitive Golden Globe Award nominations without a win. He won two Writers Guild of America Awards for Best Original Screenplay for The Producers and Blazing Saddles.

He adapted The Producers into a commercially and critically successful 2001 musical on Broadway starring Nathan Lane and Matthew Broderick. At the 55th Tony Awards he received three Tony Awards for Best Musical, Best Book of a Musical, and Best Original Score. Brooks also received three Drama Desk Awards, a Drama League Award, a New York Film Critics Circle Award, and two Outer Critics Circle Awards. The production transferred to the West End in London where Brooks won the Laurence Olivier Award for Best New Musical in 2005.

For his work on television he received the Primetime Emmy Award Outstanding Writing for a Variety Series for the CBS variety special The Sid Caesar, Imogene Coca, Carl Reiner, Howard Morris Special (1967) and as well as three Primetime Emmy Awards for Outstanding Guest Actor in a Comedy Series for the NBC sitcom Mad About You in 1997, 1998, and 1999. Brooks earned three Grammy Awards; for Best Comedy Album for The 2000 Year Old Man in the Year 2000, Best Musical Theater Album for The Producers, and Best Music Film for Recording The Producers.

== Major associations ==
=== Academy Awards ===
Year	Category	Nominated work	Result	Ref.
1969	Best Original Screenplay	The Producers	Won	
1975	Best Adapted Screenplay	Young Frankenstein	Nominated	
1975	Best Original Song	"Blazing Saddles", Blazing Saddles	Nominated	
2023	Academy Honorary Award	—N/a	Honored	

Directed Academy Award performances
Under Brooks' direction, these actors have received Academy Award nominations for their performances in their respective roles.

Year	Performer	Film	Result
Academy Award for Best Supporting Actor
1969	Gene Wilder	The Producers	Nominated
Academy Award for Best Supporting Actress
1975	Madeline Kahn	Blazing Saddles	Nominated

=== BAFTA Awards ===
British Academy Film Awards
Year	Category	Nominated work	Result	Ref.
1975	Best Screenplay	Blazing Saddles	Nominated	
2017	BAFTA Fellowship	—N/a	Honored	

=== Emmy Awards ===
Year	Category	Nominated work	Result	Ref.
Primetime Emmy Awards
1956	Best Comedy Writing	Caesar's Hour	Nominated	
1957	Best Comedy Writing	Caesar's Hour	Nominated	
1958	Best Comedy Writing	Caesar's Hour	Nominated	
1966	Outstanding Writing Achievement in Comedy	Get Smart	Nominated	
1967	Outstanding Writing Achievement in Variety	The Sid Caesar, Imogene Coca, Carl Reiner, Howard Morris Special	Won	
1997	Outstanding Guest Actor in a Comedy Series	Mad About You	Won	
1998	Outstanding Guest Actor in a Comedy Series	Mad About You	Won	
1999	Outstanding Guest Actor in a Comedy Series	Mad About You	Won	
2012	Outstanding Variety Special	Mel Brooks and Dick Cavett Together Again	Nominated	
2013	Outstanding Variety Special	Mel Brooks Strikes Back: With Mel Brooks and Alan Yentob	Nominated	
2015	Outstanding Variety Special	Mel Brooks: Live at the Geffen	Nominated	
2015	Outstanding Writing for a Variety Special	Mel Brooks: Live at the Geffen	Nominated	
2015	Outstanding Guest Actor in a Comedy Series	The Comedians	Nominated	
2023	Outstanding Character Voice-Over Performance	History of the World, Part II	Nominated	
Daytime Emmy Awards
2005	Outstanding Performer in an Animated Program	Jakers! The Adventures of Piggley Winks	Nominated	

=== Golden Globe Awards ===
Year	Category	Nominated work	Result	Ref.
1969	Best Screenplay	The Producers	Nominated	
1977	Best Actor – Motion Picture Musical or Comedy	Silent Movie	Nominated	
1978	Best Actor – Motion Picture Musical or Comedy	High Anxiety	Nominated	
1978	Best Motion Picture – Musical or Comedy	High Anxiety	Nominated	
2006	Best Motion Picture – Musical or Comedy	The Producers	Nominated	
2006	Best Original Song	"There's Nothing Like a Show on Broadway", The Producers	Nominated	

=== Grammy Awards ===
Year	Category	Nominated work	Result	Ref.
1961	Best Comedy Album	2000 Year Old Man	Nominated	
1962	Best Comedy Album	2000 and One Years with Carl Reiner and Mel Brooks	Nominated	
1964	Best Comedy Album	Carl Reiner and Mel Brooks at the Cannes Film Festival	Nominated	
1982	Best Comedy Album	The Inquisition (Mel Brooks' History Of The World, Part I)	Nominated	
1999	Best Comedy Album	The 2000 Year Old Man in the Year 2000	Won	
2002	Best Musical Theater Album	The Producers	Won	
2002	Best Long Form Music Video	Recording The Producers: A Musical Romp With Mel Brooks	Won	
2007	Best Song Written for Visual Media	"There's Nothing Like A Show On Broadway", The Producers	Nominated	
2009	Best Musical Theater Album	Young Frankenstein	Nominated	
2023	Best Audio Book, Narration & Storytelling Recording	All About Me!	Nominated	

=== Laurence Olivier Awards ===
Year	Category	Nominated work	Result	Ref.
2005	Best New Musical	The Producers	Won	

=== Tony Awards ===
Year	Category	Nominated work	Result	Ref.
2001	Best Musical	The Producers	Won	
2001	Best Book of a Musical	The Producers	Won	
2001	Best Original Score	The Producers	Won	

== Miscellaneous awards ==
Organizations	Year	Category	Project	Result	Ref.
American Comedy Awards	1997	Funniest Male Guest Appearance in a TV Series	Mad About You	Won	
American Comedy Awards	2000	Funniest Male Guest Appearance in a TV Series	Mad About You	Won	
CINE#Notable CINE	1963	Golden Eagle Award	The Critic	Won	
Hugo Award	1975	Best Dramatic Presentation	Young Frankenstein	Won	
Nebula Award	1976	Best Dramatic Writing	Young Frankenstein	Won	
Saturn Awards	1976	Best Director	Young Frankenstein	Won	
Stinkers Bad Movie Awards	1981	Worst Picture	History of the World, Part I	Nominated	
Stinkers Bad Movie Awards	1987	Worst Picture	Spaceballs	Won	
Stinkers Bad Movie Awards	1997	Lifetime Non-Achievement Award – The Hall of Shame		Nominated	
Stinkers Bad Movie Awards	2007	Most Painfully Unfunny Comedy	History of the World, Part I	Won	
Stinkers Bad Movie Awards	2007	Worst Song	"The Inquisition" from History of the World, Part I	Nominated	
Nastro d'Argento	1984	Best Foreign Actor	To Be or Not to Be	Nominated	
Writers Guild of America Awards	1969	Best Written Comedy	The Producers	Nominated	
Writers Guild of America Awards	1969	Best Original Screenplay	The Producers	Won	
Writers Guild of America Awards	1971	Best Adapted Screenplay – Comedy	The Twelve Chairs	Nominated	
Writers Guild of America Awards	1975	Best Adapted Screenplay – Comedy	Young Frankenstein	Nominated	
Writers Guild of America Awards	1975	Best Original Screenplay – Comedy	Blazing Saddles	Won	
Writers Guild of America Awards	1977	Best Original Screenplay – Comedy	Silent Movie	Nominated	

== Other theatre awards ==
Organizations	Year	Category	Project	Result	Ref.
Drama Desk Awards	2001	Outstanding Musical	The Producers	Won	
Drama Desk Awards	2001	Outstanding Book of a Musical	The Producers	Won	
Drama Desk Awards	2001	Outstanding Lyrics	The Producers	Won	
Drama Desk Awards	2008	Outstanding Lyrics	Young Frankenstein	Nominated	
Drama League Awards	2001	Outstanding Production of a Musical	The Producers	Won	
Drama League Awards	2008	Outstanding Production of a Musical	Young Frankenstein	Nominated	
New York Drama Critics' Circles	2001	Best Musical	The Producers	Won	
Outer Critics Circle Awards	2001	The Producers	Outstanding Broadway Musical	Won	
Outer Critics Circle Awards	2008	Young Frankenstein	Outstanding New Broadway Musical	Won	
Outer Critics Circle Awards	2008	Young Frankenstein	Outstanding New Score	Nominated	

== Honorary awards ==
Organizations	Year	Notes	Result	Ref.
American Comedy Awards	1987	Lifetime Achievement Award in Comedy	Honored	
Writers Guild of America Awards	2003	Laurel Award for Screenwriting Achievement	Honored	
Ernst Lubitsch Award	2009	Honorary Award	Honored	
Kennedy Center Honor	2009	Medal	Honored	
Hollywood Walk of Fame	2010	Motion Picture Star	Honored	
American Film Institute	2013	AFI Life Achievement Award	Honored	
British Film Institute Fellowship	2015	Inductee	Honored	
National Medal of Arts	2016	Medal	Honored	
British Academy Film Awards	2017	BAFTA Fellowship	Honored	
Ministry of Culture and National Heritage (Poland)	2018	Gold Gloria Artis Medal for Merit to Culture	Honored	
Academy Awards	2023	Academy Honorary Award	Honored	
Peabody Awards	2024	Career Peabody Award	Honored	
