= Mel Brooks on screen and stage =

List of Mel Brooks' directorial, screenwriting and acting credits

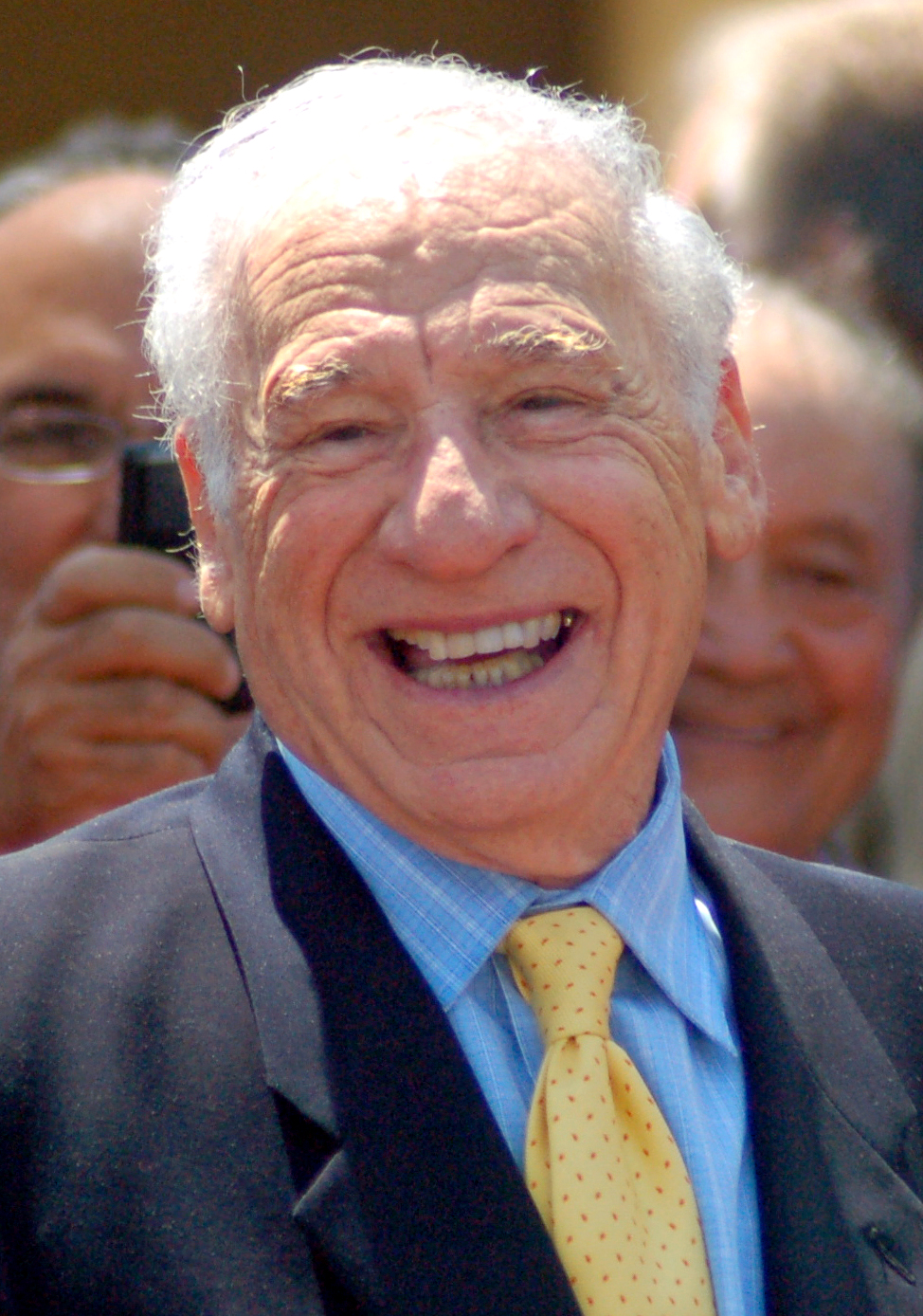
Brooks receiving a star on the Hollywood Walk of Fame in 2010

Mel Brooks is an actor, comedian, and filmmaker of the stage, television, and screen. He started his work as a comedy writer, actor, and then director of 11 feature films including The Producers (1967), Young Frankenstein (1974), and Blazing Saddles (1974). He is also known for his work on Broadway, including The Producers (2001).

Key
†	Denotes films that have not yet been released

== Film ==
Year	Title	Director	Writer	Producer	Notes
1954	New Faces	No	Yes	No	Credited as "Melvin Brooks"
1961	The Ladies Man	No	Uncredited	No	
1967	The Producers	Yes	Yes	No	Directorial debut
1970	The Twelve Chairs	Yes	Yes	No	
1974	Blazing Saddles	Yes	Yes	No	
1974	Young Frankenstein	Yes	Yes	No	
1976	Silent Movie	Yes	Yes	No	
1977	High Anxiety	Yes	Yes	Yes	
1980	The Elephant Man	No	No	Uncredited	
1981	History of the World, Part I	Yes	Yes	Yes	
1983	To Be or Not to Be	No	No	Yes	
1985	The Doctor and the Devils	No	No	Yes	
1986	The Fly	No	No	Uncredited	
1987	Spaceballs	Yes	Yes	Yes	
1991	Life Stinks	Yes	Yes	Yes	
1992	The Vagrant	No	No	Yes	
1993	Robin Hood: Men in Tights	Yes	Yes	Yes	
1995	Dracula: Dead and Loving It	Yes	Yes	Yes	
2005	The Producers	No	Yes	Yes	
2022	Paws of Fury: The Legend of Hank	No	Yes	Executive	
2027	Spaceballs: The New One †	No	No	Yes	Post-production

=== Acting roles ===
Year	Title	Role	Notes
1963	The Critic	Narrator	Short film
1967	The Producers	Singer in "Springtime for Hitler"	Voice, uncredited
1970	The Twelve Chairs	Tikon	
1974	Blazing Saddles	Governor William Le Petomane / Indian Chief / Aviator Applicant / Back-Up German Singer (voice) / Grouchy Moviegoer (voice)	
1974	Young Frankenstein	Werewolf / Cat Hit by Dart / Victor Frankenstein	Voice, uncredited
1976	Silent Movie	Mel Funn	
1977	High Anxiety	Richard H. Thorndyke	
1979	The Muppet Movie	Professor Krassman	
1981	History of the World, Part I	Moses / Comicus / Torquemada / Jacques / King Louis XVI	
1983	To Be or Not to Be	Dr. Frederick Bronski	
1987	Spaceballs	Yogurt / President Skroob	
1990	Look Who's Talking Too	Mr. Toilet Man	Voice
1991	Life Stinks	Goddard Bolt	
1992	Mickey's Audition	Film director	Short film
1993	Robin Hood: Men in Tights	Rabbi Tuckman	
1994	The Little Rascals	Mr. Welling	
1995	Dracula: Dead and Loving It	Dr. Abraham Van Helsing	
1999	Screw Loose	Jake Gordon	
2000	Sex, Lies and Video Violence	Stressed old man	
2005	Robots	Bigweld	Voice
2005	The Producers	Himself / Hilda the Pigeon (voice) / Tom the Cat (voice) / German Soldier (voice)	
2010	Ruby's Studio: The Feelings Show	Sally Simon Simmons / Narrator	Voice
2014	Mr. Peabody & Sherman	Albert Einstein	Voice, cameo
2015	Underdogs	The Agent	Voice, U.S. dub
2015	Hotel Transylvania 2	Vlad Dracula	Voice
2017	Leap!	M. Luteau	Voice, U.S. dub
2017	The Guardian Brothers	Mr. Rogman	Voice, U.S. dub
2018	Hotel Transylvania 3: Summer Vacation	Vlad	Voice
2019	Toy Story 4	Melephant Brooks	Voice
2022	Paws of Fury: The Legend of Hank	Shogun Toshi	Voice
2026	The Land of Sometimes	The Postman	Voice
2027	Spaceballs: The New One †	Yogurt / President Skroob	Post-production

== Television ==
Year	Title	Writer	Creator	Executive Producer	Notes
1949	Admiral Broadway Revue	Yes	No	No	
1950–54	Your Show of Shows	Yes	No	No	
1954–57	Caesar's Hour	Yes	No	No	
1958	Sid Caesar Invites You	Yes	No	No	
1965–70	Get Smart	Yes	Yes	No	Also character developer
1975	The 2000 Year Old Man	Yes	No	No	TV special
1975	When Things Were Rotten	Yes	Yes	Yes	1 episode
1989	The Nutt House	Yes	Yes	Yes	1 episode
2008–09	Spaceballs: The Animated Series	Yes	Yes	Yes	Also composer
2023	History of the World, Part II	Yes	Yes	Yes	
TBA	Very Young Frankenstein †	No	No	Yes	Filming

=== Acting roles ===
Year	Title	Role	Notes
1961	The New Steve Allen Show	2000 Year Old Man	2 episodes
1962–92	The Tonight Show Starring Johnny Carson	Guest / Himself	19 episodes
1967	The Sid Caesar, Imogene Coca, Carl Reiner, Howard Morris Special	Himself	TV special
1968–78	The Hollywood Squares (Daytime)	Himself / Panelist	15 episodes
1971–77	The Electric Company	Blond-Haired Cartoon Man (voice)	780 episodes
1974	Free to Be... You and Me	Baby Boy (voice)	Television film
1975	The 2000 Year Old Man	2000 Year Old Man (voice)	TV special
1983	An Audience with Mel Brooks	Himself	TV special
1990	The Tracey Ullman Show	Buzz Schlanger	Episode: "Due Diligence"
1993	Frasier	Tom (voice)	Episode: "Miracle on Third or Fourth Street"
1995	The Simpsons	Himself (voice)	Episode: "Homer vs. Patty and Selma"
1996–99	Mad About You	Uncle Phil	4 episodes
1997	I Am Your Child	Himself	
2000	The Kids from Room 402	Mr. Miller (voice)	Episode: "Squeezed Out"
2002	It's a Very Merry Muppet Christmas Movie	Joe Snow (voice)	Television film
2003	The Adventures of Jimmy Neutron: Boy Genius	Santa Claus (voice)	Episode: "Holly Jolly Jimmy"
2003–07	Jakers! The Adventures of Piggley Winks	Wiley the Sheep (voice)	47 episodes
2004	Curb Your Enthusiasm	Himself	4 episodes
2008–09	Spaceballs: The Animated Series	President Skroob, Yogurt (voice)	13 episodes
2010	Glenn Martin, DDS	Canine (voice)	Episode: "A Very Martin Christmas"
2011	Special Agent Oso	Grandpa Mel (voice)	Episode: "On Old MacDonald's Special Song/Snapfingers"
2011	The Paul Reiser Show	The Angry Cat (voice)	Episode: "The Playdate"
2011	Mel Brooks and Dick Cavett Together Again	Himself	TV special
2012	Comedians in Cars Getting Coffee	Himself	Episode: "I Want Sandwiches, I Want Chicken"
2012	Mel Brooks Strikes Back	Himself	TV special
2014	Jeopardy!	Video Clue Presenter	Episode #30.131
2014	Dora the Explorer	Mad Hatter (voice)	Episode: "Dora in Wonderland"
2015	Mel Brooks: Live at the Geffen	Himself	Stand-up TV special
2015	The Comedians	Himself	Episode: "Celebrity Guest"
2018	To Tell the Truth	Himself	Season 3, episode 2
2019	Forky Asks A Question	Melephant Brooks (voice)	Episode: "What Is Love?"
2022	Little Demon	Millipede (voice)	Episode: "Village of the Found"
2023	History of the World, Part II	Narrator	8 episodes
2023	Only Murders in the Building	Himself	Episode: "CoBro"
2025	Somebody Feed Phil	Himself	S8 E5 "Sydney and Adelaide"
TBA	Fairy Tale Forest	Burgermeister	TV movie, Completed

== Theatre ==
Year	Title	Notes	Venue	Ref.
1952	New Faces of 1952	Writer	Royale Theatre	
1957	Shinbone Alley	Writer	Broadway Theater	
1962	All American	Writer	Winter Garden Theater	
2001	The Producers	Composer, lyricist, writer, producer	St. James Theatre	
2007	Young Frankenstein	Composer, lyricist, writer, producer	Hilton Theatre	
2019	Mel Brooks on Broadway	Performer	Lunt-Fontanne Theatre	

== Other credits ==
Year	Title	Position	Notes
1983	Mel Brooks: To Be or Not to Be - The Hitler Rap	Composer, lyricist	Short
2001	Great Performances	Composer	1 episode
2008	Get Smart	Consultant	
2016	Sam	Executive producer	
2020	Grandma for President	Actor (voice of Ernie Blanders)	Podcast series
2026	The Land of Sometimes	Executive producer	

=== Collaborators ===
Brooks cast certain actors in more than one of his films. His most frequent collaborators were Rudy De Luca (7 films), Dom DeLuise (6 films), Madeline Kahn, Harvey Korman, Charlie Callas, Carol Arthur, and Robert Ridgely (4 films each).
