= To Be or Not to Be (1942 film) =

1942 film by Ernst Lubitsch

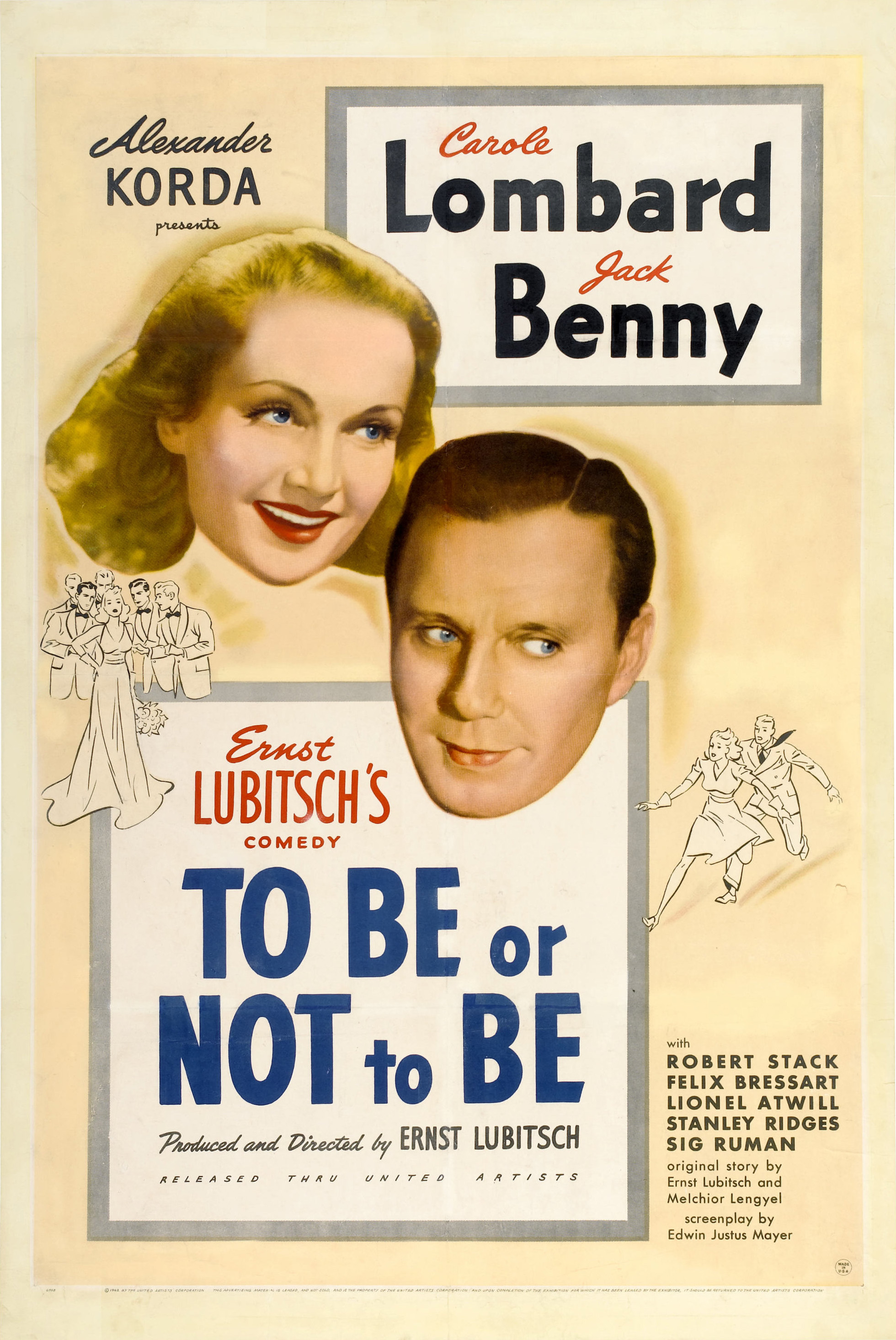
- Theatrical release poster
- Directed by: Ernst Lubitsch
- Screenplay by: Edwin Justus Mayer; Ernst Lubitsch (uncredited)
- Story by: Melchior Lengyel
- Produced by: Ernst Lubitsch
- Starring: Carole Lombard; Jack Benny; Robert Stack; Felix Bressart; Lionel Atwill; Stanley Ridges; Sig Ruman
- Cinematography: Rudolph Maté
- Edited by: Dorothy Spencer
- Music by: Werner R. Heymann; Miklós Rózsa (uncredited)
- Production company: Romaine Film Corp.
- Distributed by: United Artists
- Release dates: February 19, 1942 (Los Angeles); March 6, 1942 (United States)
- Running time: 99 minutes
- Country: United States
- Language: English
- Budget: $1.2 million
- Box office: $1.5 million (US rentals)

Trailer for To Be or Not to Be

To Be or Not to Be is a 1942 American black comedy film produced and directed by Ernst Lubitsch, starring Carole Lombard and Jack Benny, and featuring Robert Stack, Felix Bressart, Lionel Atwill, Stanley Ridges, and Sig Ruman. The plot concerns a troupe of actors in Nazi-occupied Warsaw who use their abilities at disguise and acting to fool the occupying troops. It was adapted by Lubitsch (uncredited) and Edwin Justus Mayer from the story by Melchior Lengyel. To Be or Not to Be was released one month after Lombard was killed in an airplane crash. In 1996, it was selected for preservation in the United States National Film Registry by the Library of Congress as being "culturally, historically, or aesthetically significant."

== Plot ==
In 1939, the well-known stars of a Warsaw theater company, including "ham" Joseph Tura and wife Maria, are rehearsing Gestapo, a play satirizing the Nazi regime. During the company's production of Hamlet that night, with Joseph in the title role, Maria receives a bouquet of flowers from Lieutenant Stanislav Sobinski. After Maria arranges a secret meeting with Sobinski in her dressing room, he walks out as Joseph begins Hamlet's "To be, or not to be" soliloquy. Soon, the government issues orders to cancel Gestapo in order to avoid worsening relations with Germany. The following night, Sobinski again walks out on Hamlet's soliloquy to meet Maria, infuriating Joseph. Sobinski confesses his love for Maria, but as Germany invades Poland, he leaves to join the Royal Air Force's Polish squadron.

In England, Sobinski and his fellows meet the Polish resistance leader, Professor Siletsky, who will soon return to Warsaw on a secret mission. As the men give Siletsky messages for their loved ones, Sobinski gives him a secret message for Maria, which reads "To be or not to be", but becomes suspicious when Siletsky fails to recognize the famous actress. After informing British intelligence that Siletsky has a list of names and addresses of Polish airmen's relatives, Sobinski is sent to Warsaw to warn the resistance. In Warsaw, Siletsky sends for Maria and relays Sobinski's message to her. He invites Maria to dinner, hoping to recruit her as a Nazi spy. Just before she arrives at her apartment, Joseph returns and finds Sobinski in his bed. Although confused, Joseph agrees to help Maria and Sobinski obtain Siletsky's list.

Siletsky is summoned to "Gestapo headquarters"—the theater—where Joseph impersonates Colonel Ehrhardt. After giving Joseph the list of Polish resistance fighters' relatives, Siletsky mentions Sobinski's secret message for Maria. Overcome with jealousy, Joseph inadvertently reveals himself. Siletsky pulls a gun on him and tries to escape but is shot dead by Sobinski. Joseph disguises himself as Siletsky and goes to Siletsky's hotel to retrieve an additional copy of his list. There, he finds Maria, who was unable to leave without Siletsky's approval, and Captain Schultz, who has come to take him to meet with Ehrhardt.

Posing as Siletsky, Joseph names recently executed prisoners as the leaders of the resistance. The next day, the real Siletsky's corpse is found in the theater, and Ehrhardt sends for Maria to inform her. Unaware of this, Joseph, again masquerading as Siletsky, arranges another meeting with Ehrhardt. To expose Joseph as an impostor, Ehrhardt leaves him in a room with Siletsky's dead body. Joseph shaves off Siletsky's beard and applies a spare fake beard. He then goads Ehrhardt into pulling it off, convincing him Joseph is the real Siletsky. The scheme works until several actors disguised as Adolf Hitler's safety squad arrive, yank off Joseph's fake beard, and pretend to arrest him. Everyone is safe but now cannot leave Poland on the plane Ehrhardt had arranged for Siletsky.

The Nazis stage a show to honor the visiting Hitler. The actors slip into the theater dressed as Nazis and hide until Hitler and his entourage take their seats. Jewish actor Greenberg suddenly appears and rushes Hitler's box while the rest of the actors infiltrate the real Nazis. Greenberg is captured by the Nazis, giving him the long-awaited opportunity to deliver Shylock's speech from The Merchant of Venice. Posing as Hitler's security chief, Joseph "arrests" Greenberg. All the actors—including Bronski disguised as Hitler—march out, get in Hitler's cars and drive away.

Ehrhardt arrives at Maria's apartment and tries to seduce her until Bronski, dressed as Hitler, arrives to pick her up. As Maria leaves with Bronski, a shocked Ehrhardt assumes she is Hitler's mistress and tries to shoot himself. The actors take off in Hitler's plane, and Sobinski flies to England. When Joseph is asked by the press what reward he would like for saving the underground movement, Maria declares that he wants to play Hamlet. While performing on stage, Joseph sees Sobinski in the audience, but to the surprise of both men, another young officer walks out on Joseph's soliloquy.

== Cast ==
- Carole Lombard as Maria Tura, a famous Polish actress
- Jack Benny as Joseph Tura, a famous Polish actor and Maria's husband
- Robert Stack as Lt. Stanislav Sobinski, a Polish airman in love with Maria
- Felix Bressart as Greenberg, a Jewish actor who plays bit parts and dreams of playing Shylock
- Lionel Atwill as Rawitch, a ham actor
- Stanley Ridges as Professor Alexander Siletsky, a Nazi spy pretending to be a Polish resistance worker
- Sig Ruman as Col. Ehrhardt, the bumbling Gestapo commander in Warsaw
- Tom Dugan as Bronski, a minor actor who impersonates Hitler
- Charles Halton as Dobosh, the producer of the company
- George Lynn an actor who masquerades as Col. Ehrhardt's adjutant
- Henry Victor as Capt. Schultz, the real adjutant of Col. Ehrhardt
- Maude Eburne as Anna, Maria's maid
- Halliwell Hobbes as Gen. Armstrong, a British intelligence officer
- Miles Mander as Major Cunningham, a British intelligence officer
- James Finlayson as Scottish farmer (uncredited)
- Olaf Hytten as Polonius in Warsaw (uncredited)
- Maurice Murphy as Polish RAF pilot (uncredited)
- Frank Reicher as Polish Foreign Office official (uncredited)

== Production ==
Lubitsch had never considered anyone other than Jack Benny for the lead role in the film. He had even written the character with Benny in mind. Benny, thrilled that a director of Lubitsch's caliber had been thinking of him while writing it, accepted the role immediately. Benny was in a predicament as, strangely enough, his success in the film version of Charley's Aunt (1941) did not interest anyone in hiring the actor for their films.

For Benny's co-star, the studio and Lubitsch decided on Miriam Hopkins, whose career had been faltering in recent years. The role was designed as a comeback for the veteran actress, but Hopkins and Benny did not get along well, and Hopkins left the production.

Lubitsch was left without a leading lady until Carole Lombard, hearing his predicament, asked to be considered. Lombard had never worked with the director and yearned to have an opportunity. Lubitsch agreed and Lombard was cast. The film also provided Lombard with an opportunity to work with friend Robert Stack, whom she had known since he was a teenager. The film was shot at United Artists, which allowed Lombard to say that she had worked at every major studio in Hollywood.

== Release ==
To Be or Not to Be opened in three theaters in Los Angeles on February 19, 1942, followed by a nationwide release on March 6.

== Reception ==
The initial reception of To Be or Not to Be was marked by public apprehension due to its satirical depiction of the Nazis. Reviewers at the time criticized the use of such a serious and palpable threat as a basis for comedy. However, modern-day critics have since come to regard the movie as one of Lubitsch's notable achievements. According to Jack Benny's unfinished memoir, published in 1990, Benny's father initially left the theater in disgust at seeing his son in a Nazi uniform in the film, but Benny eventually convinced him to return. Subsequently, his father not only embraced the film but watched it 46 times.

The same could not be said for all critics. While they generally praised Lombard, some scorned Benny and Lubitsch and found the film to be in bad taste. Bosley Crowther of The New York Times wrote that it was "hard to imagine how any one can take, without batting an eye, a shattering air raid upon Warsaw right after a sequence of farce or the spectacle of Mr. Benny playing a comedy scene with a Gestapo corpse. Mr. Lubitsch had an odd sense of humor—and a tangled script—when he made this film." The Philadelphia Inquirer agreed, calling the film "a callous, tasteless effort to find fun in the bombing of Warsaw." Some critics were especially offended by Colonel Ehrhardt's line: "Oh, yes I saw him [Tura] in 'Hamlet' once. What he did to Shakespeare we are now doing to Poland."

However, other reviews were positive. Variety called it one of Lubitsch's "best productions in [a] number of years...a solid piece of entertainment." Harrison's Reports called it "[a]n absorbing comedy-drama of war time, expertly directed and acted. The action holds one in tense suspense at all times, and comedy of dialogue as well as of acting keeps one laughing almost constantly." John Mosher of The New Yorker also praised the film, writing "That comedy could be planted in Warsaw at the time of its fall, of its conquest by the Nazis, and not seem too incongruous to be endured is a Lubitsch triumph."

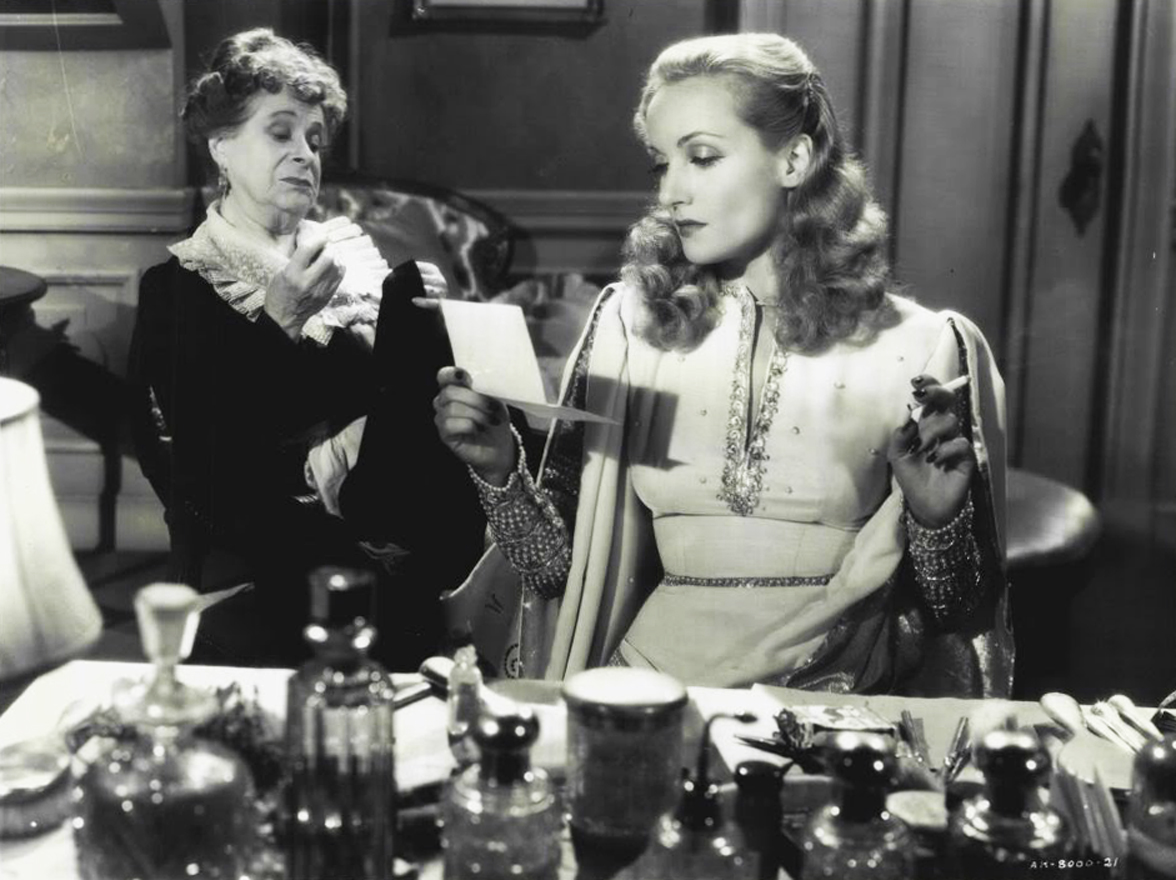
Carole Lombard in a publicity still for the film.

In 1943, critic Mildred Martin reviewed another of Lubitsch's films in The Philadelphia Inquirer and referred derogatively to his German birth and his comedy about Nazis in Poland. Lubitsch responded by publishing an open letter to the newspaper in which he wrote:

What I have satirized in this picture are the Nazis and their ridiculous ideology. I have also satirized the attitude of actors who always remain actors regardless of how dangerous the situation might be, which I believe is a true observation. ... It can be argued if the tragedy of Poland realistically portrayed as in To Be or Not to Be can be merged with satire. I believe it can be and so do the audience which I observed during a screening of To Be or Not to Be; but this is a matter of debate and everyone is entitled to his point of view, but it is certainly a far cry from "the Berlin-born director who finds fun in the bombing of Warsaw."

In recent times, the film has become recognized as a comedy classic. On the review aggregator website Rotten Tomatoes, To Be or Not to Be holds an approval rating of 96% based on 52 reviews, with an average rating of 8.8/10. The website's critics consensus reads, "A complex and timely satire with as much darkness as slapstick, Ernst Lubitsch's To Be or Not To Be delicately balances humor and ethics." Metacritic, which uses a weighted average, assigned the film a score of 86 out of 100, based on 13 critics, indicating "universal acclaim". In an interview in 2015, Slovenian cultural critic and philosopher Slavoj Žižek named it his favorite comedy, where he remarked, "It is madness, you can not do a better comedy I think."

== Awards and honors ==
To Be or Not to Be was nominated for one Academy Award: the Best Music, Scoring of a Dramatic or Comedy Picture.

The film is recognized by American Film Institute in these lists:

- 2000: AFI's 100 Years...100 Laughs – No. 49

In the 2022 edition of Sight and Sound's "Greatest Films of All Time" critics poll published by the British Film Institute, To Be or Not to Be tied for 114th place.

== Remakes ==
- A radio drama adaptation of To Be or Not to Be was produced by the Screen Guild Theater on January 18, 1943, starring William Powell and Diana Lewis.
- The film was remade by 20th Century Fox under the same name, To Be or Not to Be, in 1983. It was directed by Alan Johnson and starred Mel Brooks and Anne Bancroft.
- A stage adaptation was written in German by Juergen Hoffmann in 1988.
- A Bollywood version, Maan Gaye Mughal-e-Azam, was released in 2008.
- A stage version also titled To Be or Not to Be opened on Broadway in 2008.
- A stage adaptation was created in Budapest, Hungary by Marton László, Radnóti Zsuzsa, and Deres Péter in 2011.
- A stage adaptation was created in Madrid, Spain, by Juan Echanove in 2022.
