= Mel Brooks =

American filmmaker, actor and comedian (born 1926)

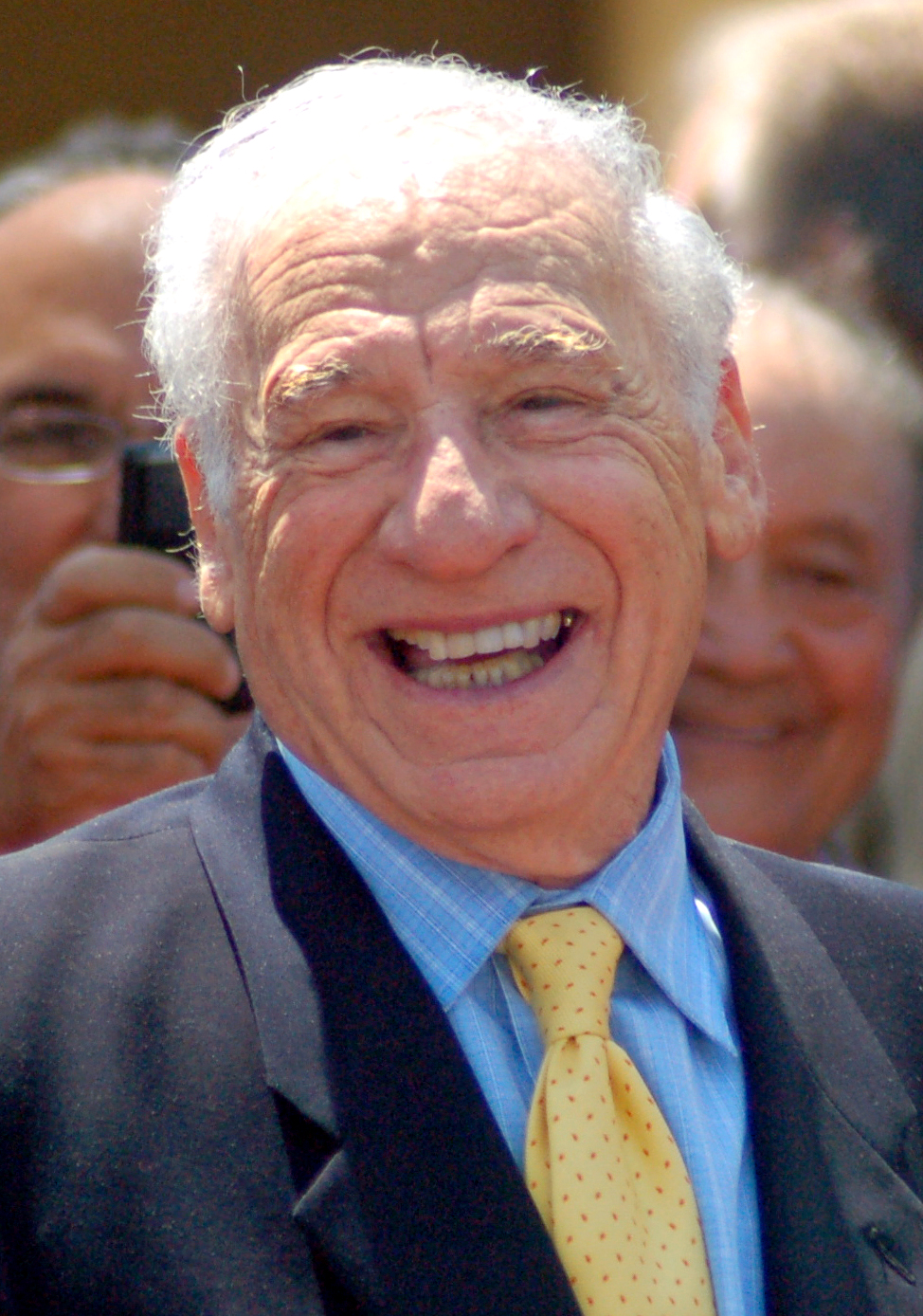
- Brooks in 2010
- Born: Melvin James Kaminsky; June 28, 1926 (age 100); New York City, U.S.
- Occupations: Filmmaker; comedian; actor; playwright; songwriter
- Years active: 1949–present
- Works: Full list
- Style: Blue comedy; observational comedy; sexual comedy; musical comedy; satire; wit; wordplay
- Spouses: Florence Baum (m. 1953; div. 1962); Anne Bancroft (m. 1964; died 2005)
- Children: 4, including Max
- Awards: Full list
- Military service
- Allegiance: United States
- Branch: United States Army
- Service years: 1944–1946
- Rank: Corporal
- Units: 78th Infantry Division, 1104th Engineer Combat Battalion, Special Services
- Conflicts: World War II; Battle of the Bulge

Mel Brooks (born Melvin James Kaminsky; June 28, 1926) is an American actor, comedian, filmmaker, songwriter and playwright. With a career spanning nine decades, he is known for a variety of successful farces and parodies. A recipient of numerous accolades, he is one of the few people to win the EGOT (Emmy, Grammy, Oscar and Tony) awards. He received a Kennedy Center Honor in 2009, a Hollywood Walk of Fame star in 2010, the AFI Life Achievement Award in 2013, a British Film Institute Fellowship in 2015, a National Medal of Arts in 2016 and a BAFTA Fellowship in 2017.

Brooks began his career as a writer for Sid Caesar's Your Show of Shows, where he worked with Mel Tolkin, Neil Simon and Carl Reiner. Reiner and Brooks co-created the comedy sketch The 2000 Year Old Man and shared the Grammy Award for Best Comedy Album for The 2000 Year Old Man in the Year 2000. With Buck Henry, he created the spy spoof Get Smart.

Brooks won the Academy Award for Best Original Screenplay for The Producers (1967). After The Twelve Chairs (1970), he made a string of successful comedies: Blazing Saddles and Young Frankenstein (both 1974), Silent Movie (1976), High Anxiety (1977), History of the World, Part I (1981) and Spaceballs (1987). His musical adaptation of The Producers ran on Broadway from 2001 to 2007 and won 12 Tony Awards. It was adapted as a film in 2005. Through his company, Brooksfilms, he produced David Lynch's The Elephant Man (1980), David Cronenberg's The Fly (1986) and David Jones's 84 Charing Cross Road (1987). With Anne Bancroft, he starred in To Be or Not To Be (1983), a remake of Ernst Lubitsch's 1942 film.

Brooks and Bancroft were married from 1964 until her death in 2005; their son Max Brooks is an actor and author. Brooks wrote a memoir, All About Me! (2021). His career was covered in Judd Apatow's documentary Mel Brooks: The 99 Year Old Man! (2026). The American Film Institute included Blazing Saddles, Young Frankenstein and The Producers on its AFI's 100 Years...100 Laughs list. In 2026, to celebrate his centenary, it moved Blazing Saddles to first place.

== Early life and education ==
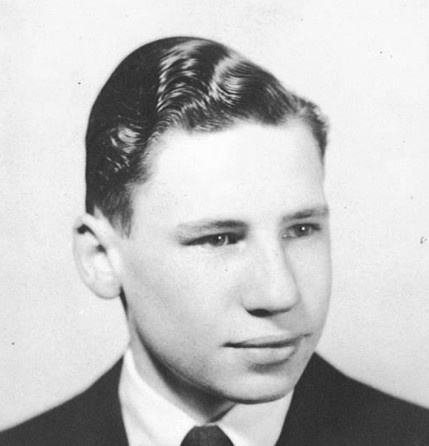
Brooks, then Melvin Kaminsky, in the 1944 Eastern District High yearbook

Brooks was born Melvin James Kaminsky on a tenement kitchen table on June 28, 1926, at 515 Powell Street in Brownsville, Brooklyn to Katie "Kitty" (née Brookman) and Max Kaminsky. He grew up in Williamsburg, Brooklyn on 365 South 3rd Street. His father's family were German Jews from Danzig (now Gdańsk, Poland). His mother was a Russian Jewish immigrant from Kiev, in the Pale of Settlement of the Russian Empire (now Ukraine). His parents married in 1916. He had three older brothers: Irving, Lenny and Bernie.

His father died of tuberculosis of the kidney at 34 when Brooks was two years old. He has said of his father's death, "There's an outrage there. I may be angry at God, or at the world, for that. And I'm sure a lot of my comedy is based on anger and hostility. Growing up in Williamsburg, I learned to clothe it in comedy to spare myself problems—like a punch in the face." Brooks was a small, sickly boy, who was often bullied because of his size. Humor was a defense mechanism: "If your enemy is laughing, how can he bludgeon you to death?"

At age nine, he saw Cole Porter's Anything Goes starring William Gaxton, Ethel Merman and Victor Moore at the Alvin Theater. After the show, he told his uncle Joe "I'm gonna do that one day!" His uncle said, "OK kid, you can do it." One of his favorite films was Frankenstein (1931), and he found he could amuse a friend by singing "Puttin' On the Ritz" à la Boris Karloff.

At 14, Brooks gained employment as a pool-side tummler at the Borscht Belt's Butler Lodge, where his antics amused audiences. He recalled standing at the edge of a diving board wearing a derby and a large alpaca overcoat with two suitcases full of rocks, and announcing: "Business is terrible! I can't go on!" before jumping, fully clothed, into the pool. It was there he met an 18-year-old Sid Caesar.

Brooks studied drumming under jazz legend Buddy Rich, a fellow Williamsburg native, and earned money as a musician from age 14. During his time as a drummer, he was given his first opportunity as a comedian at the age of 16, filling in for an ill emcee. During his teens, he changed his name to Melvin Brooks, after being confused with trumpeter Max Kaminsky. He considered using his mother's maiden name, but "Brookman" was too long to fit on his drums, so he shortened it to Brooks. Brooks graduated from Eastern District High School in Williamsburg in January 1944 and intended to follow his older brother and enroll in Brooklyn College to study psychology.

=== 1944–1946: World War II service ===
In early 1944, in his senior year in high school, Brooks was recruited to take the Army General Classification Test, a Stanford–Binet-type IQ test. He received high scores and was sent to the Army Specialized Training Program at the Virginia Military Institute to learn electrical engineering, horse riding and saber fighting. In 1944, Brooks was drafted into the US Army. Twelve weeks later, when he turned 18, he officially joined the Army at Fort Dix, New Jersey, induction center, and was sent to the Field Artillery Replacement Training Center at Fort Sill, Oklahoma, for basic and radio operator training.

Brooks was then sent back to Fort Dix for overseas assignment. Brooks says he boarded SS Sea Owl at the Brooklyn Navy Yard around February 15, 1945. A reporter for the United States Department of Defense writes that Brooks arrived in France in November 1944, and later in Belgium, serving with the 78th Infantry Division as a forward artillery observer. In December 1944, Brooks was transferred to the 1104th Engineer Combat Battalion as a combat engineer, participating in the Battle of the Bulge. Of his experience there, Brooks noted:

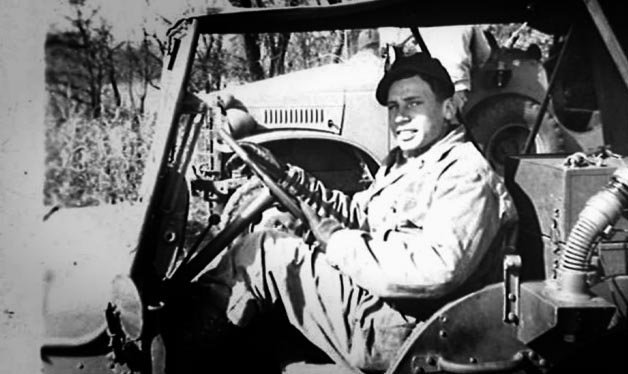
Brooks during World War II in Europe

Along the roadside, you'd see bodies wrapped up in mattress covers and stacked in a ditch, and those would be Americans, that could be me. I sang all the time ... I never wanted to think about it ... Death is the enemy of everyone, and even though you hate Nazis, death is more of an enemy than a German soldier.

Stationed in Saarbrücken and Baumholder, the battalion was responsible for clearing booby-trapped buildings and defusing land mines as the Allies advanced into Nazi Germany. Brooks was tasked with land-mine location; defusing was done by a specialist. Brooks has stated that when he heard Germans singing over loudspeakers, he responded by singing Jewish American singer Al Jolson's hit "Toot, Toot, Tootsie (Goo' Bye!)" into a bullhorn.

Brooks spent time in the stockade after taking an anti-Semitic heckler's helmet off and smashing him in the head with his mess kit. His unit constructed the first Bailey bridge over the Roer River, later building bridges over the Rhine River. In April 1945, Brooks's unit conducted its last reconnaissance missions in the Harz Mountains, Germany. Brooks's brothers also served; Lenny spent 19 months in a POW camp after his plane was shot down.

With the end of the war in Europe, Brooks joined the Special Services as a comic touring Army bases, and he was made acting corporal, put in charge of entertainment at Wiesbaden, and performed at Fort Dix. In June 1946, Brooks was honorably discharged from the Army as a corporal.

== Career ==
=== 1949–1959: Television ===
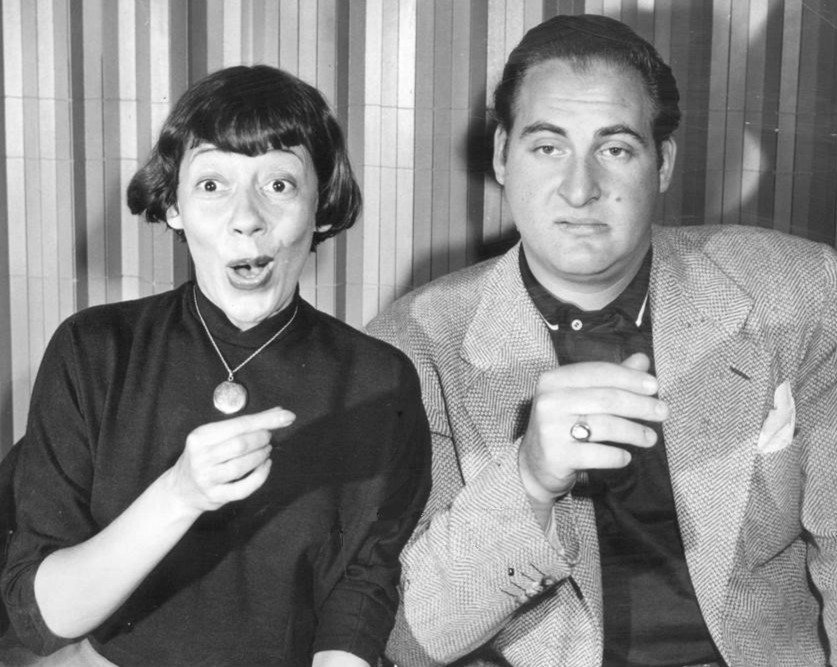
Brooks wrote for Your Show of Shows starring Imogene Coca and Sid Caesar

After the war, Brooks's mother had secured him a job as a clerk at the Brooklyn Navy Yard, but he "got into a taxi and ordered the driver to take him to the Catskills", where he worked in Borscht Belt clubs as a drummer and pianist. When a regular comic was too sick to perform, Brooks substituted. He also acted in summer stock theater in Red Bank, New Jersey and did radio work. He eventually worked his way up to tummler at Grossinger's. Brooks worked for the Broadway producer Benjamin Kutcher, who later inspired the character of Max Bialystock.

In 1949, Caesar hired Brooks to write jokes for the DuMont/NBC series The Admiral Broadway Revue, paying him, off-the-books, $50 a week. In 1950, Caesar created the variety show Your Show of Shows and hired Brooks as a writer along with Carl Reiner, Neil Simon, Danny Simon and head writer Mel Tolkin. The writing staff was widely influential. Reiner, as creator of The Dick Van Dyke Show, based Morey Amsterdam's character Buddy Sorell on Brooks. Neil Simon's Laughter on the 23rd Floor (1993) is inspired by the production of the show, and the character Ira Stone is based on Brooks. In 1952, Brooks wrote for the revue New Faces of 1952. Your Show of Shows ended in 1954 when Imogene Coca left to host her own show.

Caesar created Caesar's Hour with most of the same cast and writers, including Brooks and adding Woody Allen and Larry Gelbart. It ran from 1954 until 1957. Brooks recalled: "When I was a fledgling comedy writer working for Sid Caesar on Your Show of Shows, our head writer was Mel Tolkin... I really looked up to him. (By the way, I was 5-foot-7 and he was six feet tall.) He was a bona fide intellectual, thoroughly steeped in the traditions of great Russian literature. One day, he handed me a book. He said to me, 'Mel, you're an animal from Brooklyn, but I think you have the beginnings of something called a mind.' The book was Dead Souls by the magnificent genius Nikolai Gogol. It was a revelation. I'd never read anything like it. It was hysterically funny and incredibly moving at the same time... It was a life-changing gift, and I still read it once a year to remind myself of what great comic writing can be."

He recalled "I went to the library, and read all the books I could carry—Conrad, Fielding, Dostoevski, Gogol, Tolstoy. I decided that Tolstoy was the most gifted writer who ever lived. It's like he stuck a pen in his heart and it didn't even go through his mind on its way to the page. ... And I said to myself, 'My God, I'm not a writer, I'm a talker.'"

=== 1958–1969: "Rising below vulgarity" ===
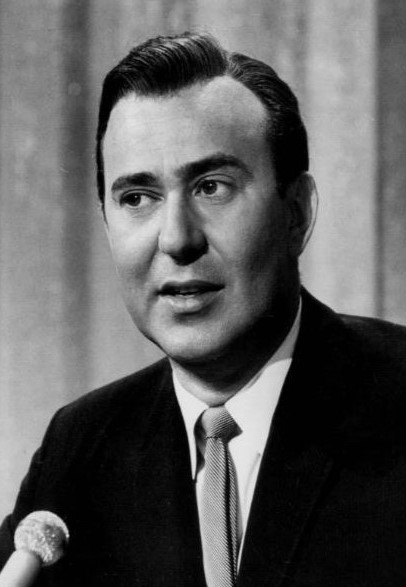
Brooks collaborated with Carl Reiner on The 2000 Year Old Man albums

Brooks and Carl Reiner became close friends and improvised comedy routines. Reiner played the straight man interviewer and pitched parts to Brooks. Reiner recalled:

I'd pick a character for him to play. I never told him what it was going to be, but I always tried for something that would force him to go into panic, because a brilliant mind in panic is a wonderful thing to see. ... I'd make him a Jewish pirate, and he'd complain about how he was being pushed out of the business because of the price of sailcloth and the cost of crews nowadays. Another time, I introduced him as Carl Sandburg, and he made up reams of phony Sandburg poetry. There was no end to what he could be—a U-boat commander, a deaf songwriter, an entire convention of antique dealers.

One of Reiner's suggestions was a 2000-year-old man who had witnessed the crucifixion of Jesus Christ (who "came in the store, but never bought anything"), had been married several hundred times and had "over forty-two thousand children, and not one comes to visit me". At first Brooks and Reiner only performed the routine for friends, but by the late 1950s it gained a reputation in New York. (In 1973, it was reported that Brooks and Reiner first performed the routine at Norman Lear's Fire Island home in the 1950s.) Tynan saw the pair perform at a party in 1959 and called Brooks "the most original comic improvisor I had ever seen".

Brooks and Reiner began performing the 2000 Year Old Man act on The Steve Allen Show. The skit resulted in the release of the comedy album 2000 Years with Carl Reiner and Mel Brooks which sold over a million copies in 1961. They eventually expanded the routine with two more albums in 1961 and 1962, a revival in 1973, a 1975 animated TV special and a reunion album in 1998.

With Joe Darion, Brooks wrote the book of the musical Shinbone Alley (1956), based on Don Marquis's archy and mehitabel. Brooks wrote the book of All American, with lyrics by Lee Adams and music by Charles Strouse. It starred Ray Bolger as a science professor at a Southern university who applies engineering principles to the football team. It was directed by Joshua Logan, who script-doctored the second act and added a gay subtext. It debuted on Broadway in 1962, where it ran for 80 performances. Brooks conceived the animated short The Critic (1963), a spoof of Norman McLaren's abstract animation. It was directed by Ernest Pintoff and Brooks ad-libbed commentary as the baffled moviegoer struggling to make sense of the short. At the 36th Academy Awards, it won Best Animated Short. That year, Brooks married the actress Anne Bancroft.

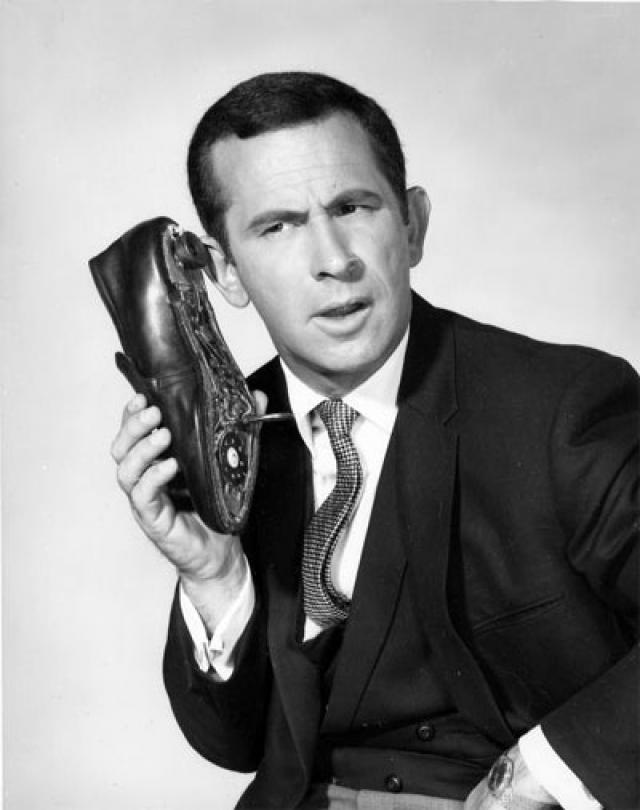
Don Adams with the iconic "Shoe Phone" in Get Smart

Brooks and Buck Henry created the spy sitcom Get Smart, about a bumbling James Bond–esque agent. Brooks said, "I was sick of looking at all those nice sensible situation comedies. They were such distortions of life... I wanted to do a crazy, unreal comic-strip kind of thing about something besides a family. No one had ever done a show about an idiot before. I decided to be the first." Starring Don Adams as Maxwell Smart, Agent 86, the series ran from 1965 until 1970, although Brooks had little involvement after the first season. It was highly rated for most of its production and won seven Primetime Emmy Awards. including Outstanding Comedy Series in 1968 and 1969. He won an Emmy for Outstanding Writing for a Variety Series for The Sid Caesar, Imogene Coca, Carl Reiner, Howard Morris Special.

During a press conference for All American, a reporter asked, "What are you going to do next?" and Brooks replied, "Springtime for Hitler," perhaps riffing on Springtime for Henry. For several years, Brooks toyed with the outrageous idea of a musical comedy about Adolf Hitler. He explored the idea as a novel and a play before writing a script about two producers making the musical. He finally found two producers to fund it, and made his first feature film, The Producers (1967).

The Producers stars Gene Wilder and Zero Mostel as Leo Bloom and Max Bialystock, Broadway producers who realize that, under certain circumstances, you can make more money with a flop than you can with a hit. Searching for a surefire flop, they produce "the worst play in the world", Springtime for Hitler by the dimwitted Nazi Franz Liebkind (Kenneth Mars). Of Bloom, Brooks said "I stole the name from Ulysses. I don't know what it meant to James Joyce, but to me Leo Bloom always meant a vulnerable Jew with curly hair. In the course of any narrative, the major characters have to metamorphose. They have to go through an experience that forces them to learn something and change. So Leo was going to change, he was going to bloom."

Brooks explained that "The only real way I could get even with Hitler and company was to bring them down with laughter." The Producers was so brazen in its satire that major studios and exhibitors would not touch it. It premiered to a limited audience in Pittsburgh, Pennsylvania, on November 22, 1967, before achieving a wide release in 1968. It became a sleeper hit on the nationwide college circuit, later in revivals. Peter Sellers championed the film, buying full-page ads for it in Variety and The New York Times. At the 41st Academy Awards, Brooks won Best Original Screenplay over Stanley Kubrick and John Cassavetes. Accepting the award, Brooks said:

Well, I'll just say what's in my heart: Ba-bump, ba-bump, ba-bump, ba-bump. But seriously, I'd like to thank Sidney Glazier, the producer of The Producers, for producing The Producers. Joseph E. Levine and his wife Rosalie for distributing the film. I'd also like to thank Zero Mostel. I'd also like to thank Gene Wilder. I'd also like to thank Gene Wilder. I'd also like to thank Gene Wilder. Thank you very much.

David Ehrenstein traces the phrase "creative accounting" to the film. Roger Ebert included it in his canon of Great Movies, and remembered being in an elevator with Brooks and Bancroft shortly after it was released: "A woman got on the elevator, recognized him and said, 'I have to tell you, Mr. Brooks, that your movie is vulgar.' Brooks smiled benevolently. 'Lady', he said, 'it rose below vulgarity.'"

=== 1970–1979: Hollywood ===
Following the success of The Producers, Glazier financed Brooks's The Twelve Chairs (1970). Loosely based on Ilf and Petrov's novel about greed in post-revolutionary Russia, it stars Ron Moody, Frank Langella and Dom DeLuise as three men searching for a fortune of diamonds hidden in a set of 12 antique chairs. Brooks cameos as an alcoholic ex-serf who "yearns for the regular beatings of yesteryear". Gene Siskel wrote "Brooks's wild humor is, predictably, amply represented by his own performance and his script. What is remarkable is the quality of his direction. ... Brooks is in complete control of the many film techniques—visual and dramatic—he employs: slow motion, speed-ups and sight gags clearly borrowed from the silent era." It was shot in Yugoslavia with a budget of $1.5 million, and was a box office flop. It is notable for the song "Hope For the Best, Expect the Worst."

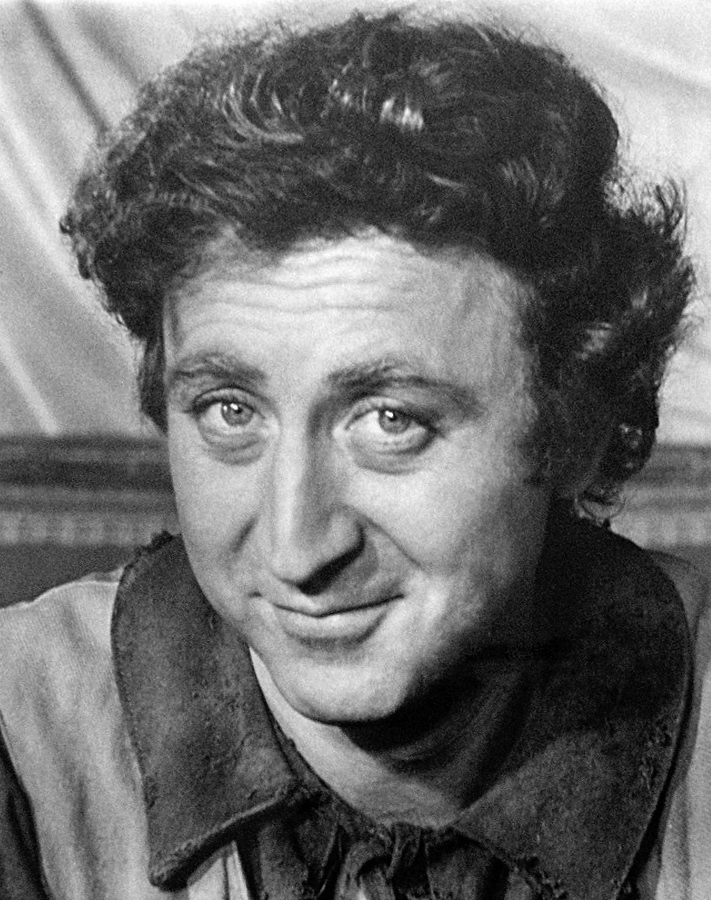
Brooks collaborated with Gene Wilder on several films including Young Frankenstein and Blazing Saddles, both in 1974

Brooks wrote an adaptation of Oliver Goldsmith's She Stoops to Conquer, but was unable to sell the idea to any studio believed that his career was over. In 1972, he met agent David Begelman, who helped him set up a deal with Warner Bros. to hire Brooks as a script doctor for the unproduced Tex-X. His cowriters included Richard Pryor, Andrew Bergman, Norman Steinberg and Al Uger. Eventually, Brooks was hired as director for what became Blazing Saddles (1974).

Blazing Saddles stars Cleavon Little as Black Bart, the Black sheriff of a racist Western town and Gene Wilder as the washed-up Waco Kid. It features Harvey Korman, Slim Pickens, Madeline Kahn, Alex Karras and Brooks, with cameos by DeLuise and Count Basie. It had music by Brooks and John Morris and a budget of $2.6 million. A spoof of Westerns, it parodies Destry Rides Again (1939), The Treasure of the Sierra Madre (1948), High Noon (1952), Once Upon a Time in the West (1968) and, in a surreal sequence, the musical spectaculars of Busby Berkeley. Brooks recalled

It was time to take two eyes, the way Picasso had done it, and put them on one side of the nose, because the official movie portrait of the West was simply a lie. For nine months, we worked together like maniacs. We went all the way—especially Richard Pryor, who was very brave and very far-out and very catalytic. I figured my career was finished anyway, so I wrote berserk, heartfelt stuff about white corruption and racism and Bible-thumping bigotry. ... We used dirty language on the screen for the first time, and to me the whole thing was like a big psychoanalytic session. I just got everything out of me—all my furor, my frenzy, my insanity, my love of life and hatred of death.

Blazing Saddles became the second-highest US grossing film of 1974, grossing $119.5 million in the United States and Canada. It was nominated for three Academy Awards: Best Supporting Actress (Kahn), Best Film Editing and Best Original Song. It won the Writers Guild of America Award for Best Comedy – Written Directly for the Screen. Brooks has said that it "has to do with love more than anything else. I mean when that black guy rides into that Old Western town and even a little old lady says 'Up yours, nigger!', you know that his heart is broken. So it's really the story of that heart being mended." Brooks described the film as "a Jewish western with a black hero". Ebert called it "a crazed grabbag of a movie that does everything to keep us laughing except hit us over the head with a rubber chicken. Mostly, it succeeds."

When Wilder replaced Gig Young as the Waco Kid, he did so on condition that Brooks's next film would be a script that Wilder had been working on: a spoof of James Whale's Frankenstein (1931) and Bride of Frankenstein (1935). After filming of Blazing Saddles wrapped, Wilder and Brooks began writing Young Frankenstein and shot it in the spring of 1974. It stars Wilder as the grandson of Victor Frankenstein, Teri Garr as his assistant, Marty Feldman as Igor and Peter Boyle as the monster. It features Kahn, Kenneth Mars, Cloris Leachman and a cameo from Gene Hackman. Morris scored, and special effects were by Universal monsters veteran Kenneth Strickfaden. Filmed in black and white by Gerald Hirschfeld, it uses iris shots, wipes and fades to black.

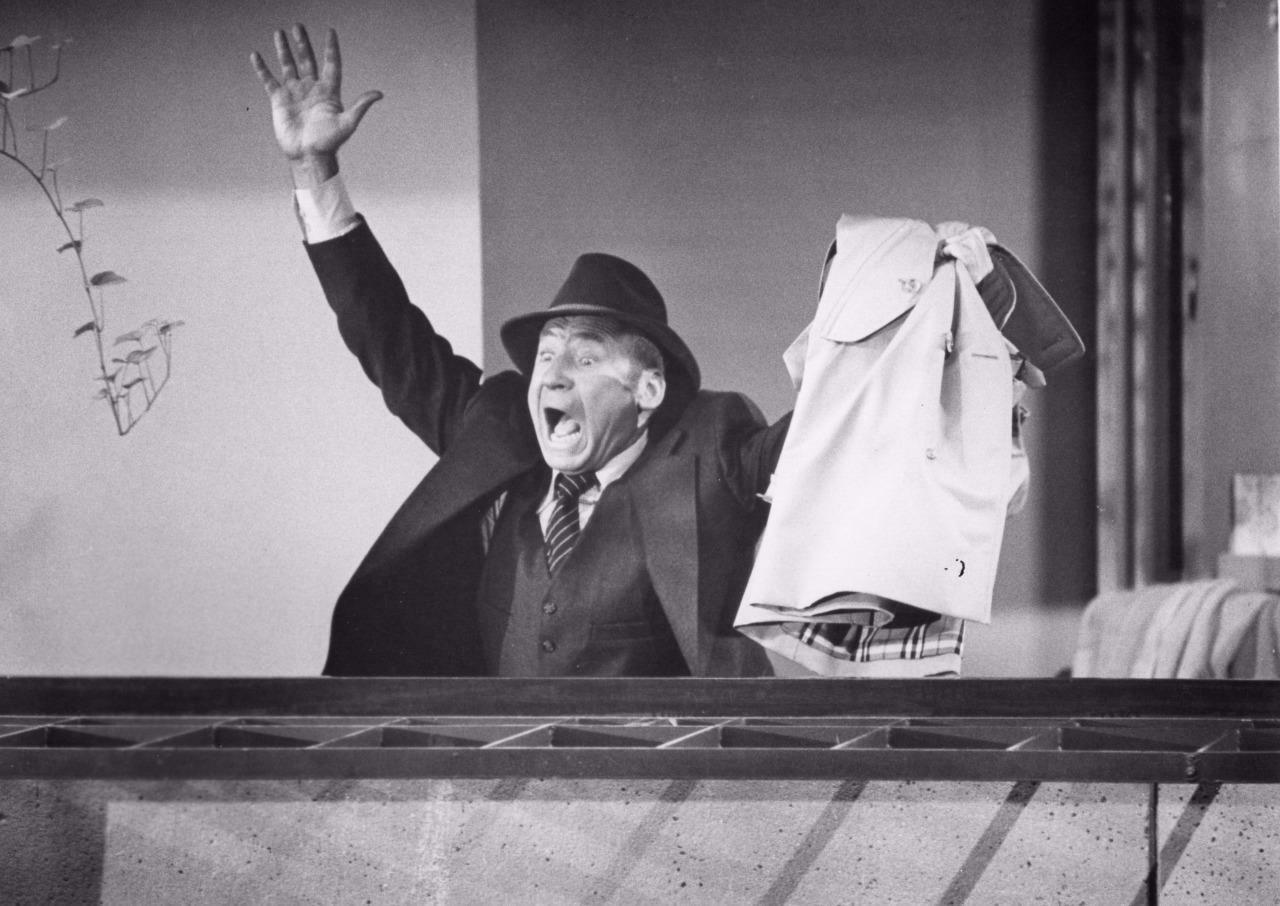
Brooks in High Anxiety, 1977

Young Frankenstein was the third-highest-grossing film domestically of 1974, just behind Blazing Saddles, with a gross of $86 million. It received Academy Award nominations for Best Adapted Screenplay and Best Sound. Pauline Kael wrote "The style of the picture is controlled excess, and the whole thing is remarkably consistent in tone … The movie works because it has the Mary Shelley story to lean on: we know that the monster will be created and will get loose. And Brooks makes a leap up as a director because, although the comedy doesn't build, he carries the story through. … [He] even has a satisfying windup, which makes this just about the only comedy of recent years that doesn't collapse." Brooks returned to TV with When Things Were Rotten, a Robin Hood spoof that lasted 13 episodes.

Brooks got a call from Ron Clark pitching the first feature-length silent comedy in four decades. Silent Movie (1976), written by Brooks and Clark, stars Brooks as a director making the first feature-length silent comedy in four decades. It features DeLuise, Feldman, Sid Caesar, Bernadette Peters and, playing themselves, Anne Bancroft, James Caan, Liza Minnelli, Paul Newman, Burt Reynolds and mime Marcel Marceau, who utters the film's only audible line of dialogue: "Non!" An homage to silent comedians Charlie Chaplin, Harold Lloyd and Buster Keaton, it was less successful than Brooks's previous two films, but grossed $36 million. That year, he ranked fifth on the Top Ten Money Making Stars Poll. Ebert wrote "It's clear at almost every moment that the filmmakers had a ball making it. ... the thing about Brooks's inside jokes is that their outsides are funny, too."

High Anxiety (1977), Brooks's parody of Alfred Hitchcock, was written by Brooks, Clark, Rudy De Luca and Barry Levinson, and was the first film Brooks produced himself. Starring Kahn, Korman, Leachman, Ron Carey, Howard Morris, Dick Van Patten and Brooks as Professor Richard H. Thorndyke, a Nobel Prize–winning psychiatrist who suffers from "high anxiety", it spoofs the Hitchcock films Suspicion, Spellbound, North by Northwest, Psycho, The Birds and Vertigo.

=== 1980–2001: Brooksfilms ===
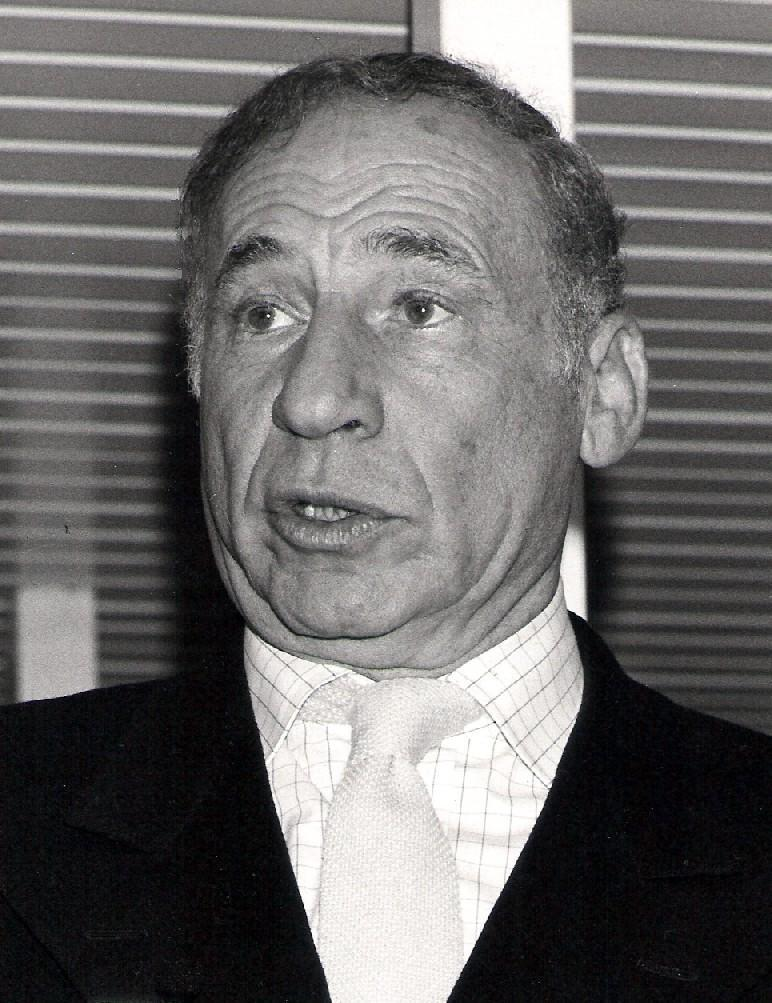
Brooks in 1984

In 1980, Siskel and Ebert named Brooks and Woody Allen "America's two funniest filmmakers". Released that year was the dramatic film The Elephant Man directed by David Lynch and produced by Brooks. Brooks was bowled over by Lynch's Eraserhead (1977), calling it "the best film I've ever seen about what it's like to have kids" and agreed to produce his next film. Knowing that anyone seeing a poster reading "Mel Brooks presents The Elephant Man" would expect a comedy, he founded Brooksfilms. It produced Richard Benjamin's My Favorite Year (1982), based on Brooks's time writing for Your Show of Shows, including an encounter with actor Errol Flynn (Peter O'Toole).

In 1981 Brooks joked that the only genres that he had not spoofed were historical epics and Biblical spectacles. History of the World, Part I was a humorous look at human history from the Dawn of Man to the French Revolution. Written, produced and directed by Brooks and narrated by Orson Welles, it earned $31 million. Kael wrote, "Either you get stuck thinking about the bad taste or you let yourself laugh at the obscenity in the humor as you do Buñuel's perverse dirty jokes."

Brooks produced a remake of Ernst Lubitsch's To Be or Not to Be (1942). To Be or Not to Be (1983) was directed by Alan Johnson and starred Brooks, Bancroft, Charles Durning, Tim Matheson, Jose Ferrer and Christopher Lloyd. Vincent Canby called it "smashingly funny. I'm not at all sure that it's a classic, but it's so good in its own right, in the way it preserves and revives the wonderfully farcical Edwin Justus Mayer screenplay, that you leave the theater having a brand-new high." It featured a controversial song on its soundtrack, "To Be or Not to Be (The Hitler Rap)", satirizing German society in the 1940s.

In 1987, Brooks directed the science fiction spoof Spaceballs, starring DeLuise, Bill Pullman, John Candy, Rick Moranis, Daphne Zuniga, Dick Van Patten, Joan Rivers and Brooks. Brooksfilms continued to produce dramatic films, including David Cronenberg's The Fly (1986). Brooks told Cronenberg, "When it comes to gore, extreme whatever, don't hold back." Brooks sought to purchase the rights to Helene Hanff's 84 Charing Cross Road for many years. David Jones's 84 Charing Cross Road, starring Bancroft and Anthony Hopkins, was released in 1987.

In 1989 Brooks, with co-executive producer Alan Spencer, returned to television with the sitcom The Nutt House, featuring Harvey Korman and Cloris Leachman. It was originally broadcast on NBC, but the network aired only five of the eleven produced episodes before canceling it. During the next decade Brooks directed Life Stinks (1991), Robin Hood: Men in Tights (1993) and Dracula: Dead and Loving It (1995). Life Stinks, loosely inspired by Preston Sturges's Sullivan's Travels (1941), was a financial and critical failure, but is notable as the only film Brooks directed that is neither a parody nor a film about other films or theater.

People magazine wrote, "Anyone in a mood for a hearty laugh couldn't do better than Robin Hood: Men in Tights, which gave fans a parody of Robin Hood, especially Robin Hood: Prince of Thieves." It also references Michael Curtiz's The Adventures of Robin Hood (1938) and Brooks's When Things Were Rotten. It is filled with one-liners and the occasional breaking of the fourth wall. It stars Cary Elwes, Richard Lewis and, in his screen debut, Dave Chappelle. Brooks cameos as Rabbi Tuckman. In 1996, he began his role as Uncle Phil on Mad About You.

=== 2001–2012: Broadway ===
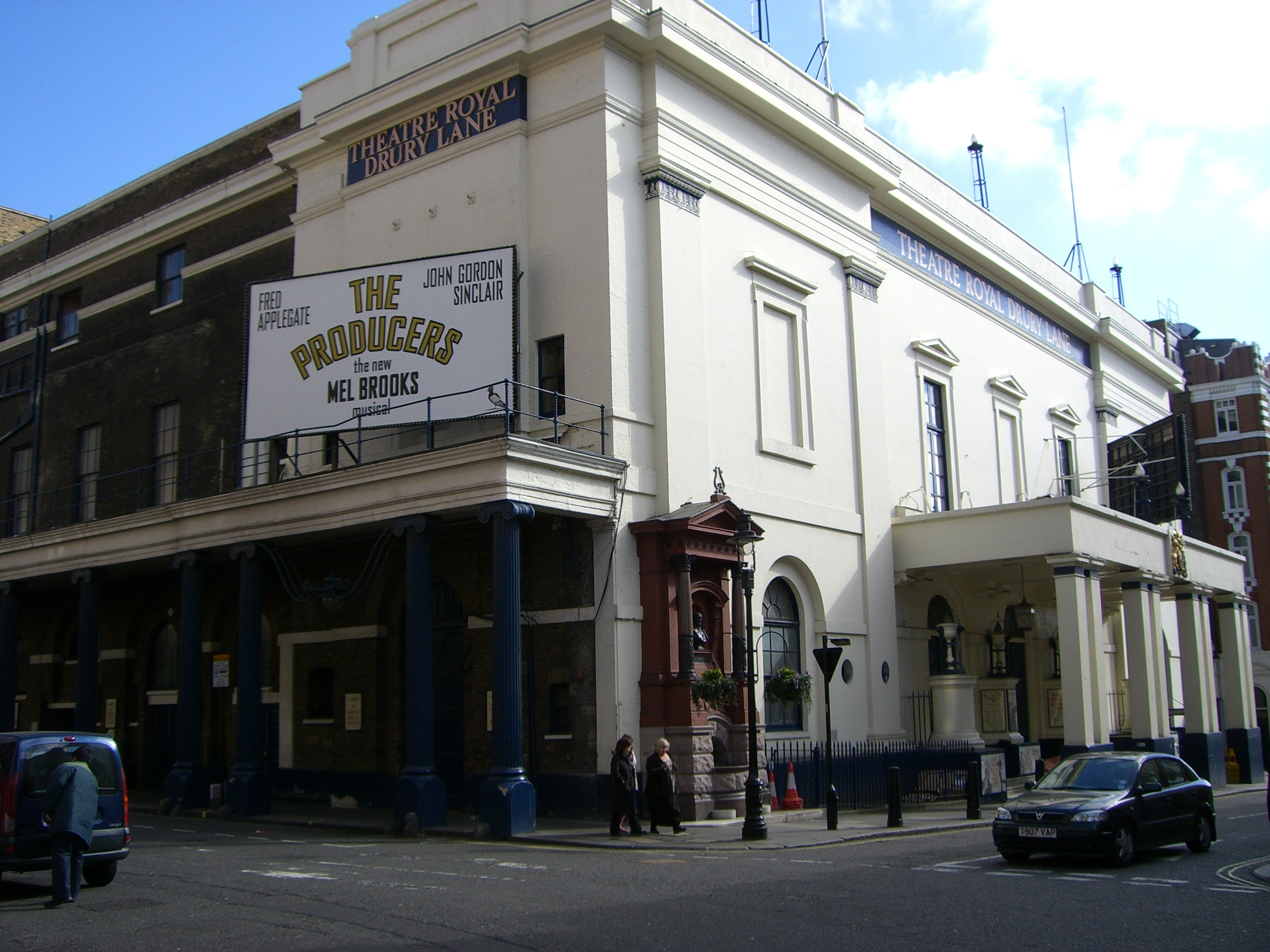
The Producers at Theatre Royal, Drury Lane in the West End

Brooks and Thomas Meehan's musical adaptation of The Producers premiered on Broadway in 2001. Starring Nathan Lane and Matthew Broderick as Bialystock and Bloom, it received critical acclaim and significant box office success. It broke the Tony Award record with 12 wins, including Best Musical. Ben Brantley wrote: "Mr. Brooks has taken what could have been overblown camp into a far warmer realm in which affection always outweighs irony." He notes it "celebrates and skewers" "great musicals from Gypsy to Follies." It was adapted into a 2005 film directed by Susan Stroman with Lane, Broderick, Gary Beach and Roger Bart reprising their stage roles, with the addition of Uma Thurman and Will Ferrell. Brooks cameos in the fourth season of Curb Your Enthusiasm, where he casts Larry David as Bialystock on Broadway.

Brooks appeared in Michael Kantor and Laurence Maslon's documentary Broadway: The American Musical (2004), discussing his experience with and love for American musical theater. In April 2006, Brooks began composing the score to a musical adaptation of Young Frankenstein. It premiered at Seattle's Paramount Theater, between August 7, 2007, and September 1, 2007. It opened on Broadway at the former Lyric Theater (then the Hilton Theatre), New York, on October 11, 2007, to mixed reviews. In the final musical number, the full company sings, "next year, Blazing Saddles!" In 2010 Brooks confirmed a Blazing Saddles musical was in development, saying that it could be finished within a year; however, no creative team or plan has been announced. Brooks worked on Spaceballs: The Animated Series, which premiered in 2008, on G4 TV.

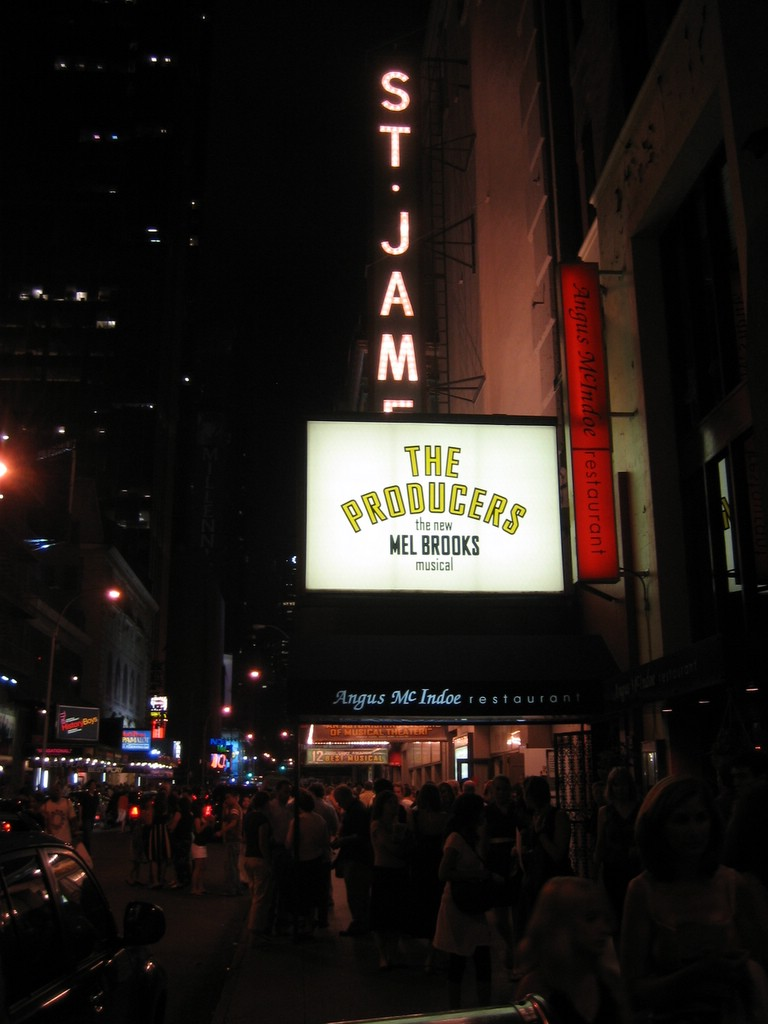
The Producers on Broadway

Brooks has lent his voice to animation, making a cameo in The Simpsons episode "Homer vs. Patty and Selma". He voiced Bigweld, the master inventor, in Robots (2005), and in Mr. Peabody & Sherman (2014) he voiced Albert Einstein. He voiced Dracula's father, Vlad, in Hotel Transylvania 2 (2015) and Hotel Transylvania 3: Summer Vacation (2018).

=== 2012–present: Later career and centenary ===
In 2012, Brooks and Carl Reiner joined Jerry Seinfeld on Comedians in Cars Getting Coffee. American Masters produced a Brooks biography, Mel Brooks: Make a Noise (2013). In 2018, he discussed his wartime experiences in the documentary GI Jews: Jewish Americans in World War II. That year, he was interviewed in Peter Bogdanovich's The Great Buster: A Celebration about the films of Buster Keaton.

Brooks published a memoir, All About Me! (2021). That year, it was announced that Brooks would write and produce History of the World, Part II, a follow-up series to his 1981 movie. He received a nomination for Primetime Emmy Award for Outstanding Character Voice-Over Performance for his role as narrator. That year, he won the Peabody Career Achievement Award.

In June 2025, Brooks announced a sequel to Spaceballs, Spaceballs: The New One, was being produced with a release date targeted for 2027. That month, it was announced that Brooks would be executive-producing Very Young Frankenstein for FX.

Judd Apatow's documentary Mel Brooks: The 99 Year Old Man! was released on HBO Max in January 2026.

== Personal life ==
=== Marriages and family ===
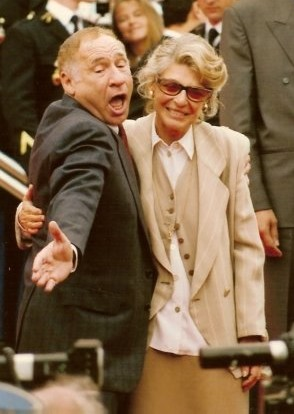
Brooks with wife Anne Bancroft at the 1991 Cannes Film Festival

Brooks met Florence Baum, a dancer in Gentlemen Prefer Blondes, on Broadway. They were married from 1953 until their divorce in 1962. They had three children, Stephanie, Nicky and Eddie. After earning a salary of $5,000 a week on Your Show of Shows and Caesar's Hour, his salary dropped to $85 a week as a freelance writer. For five years he had few gigs, and was living in Greenwich Village on Perry Street in a fourth-floor walk-up.

In 1960, to escape his situation, Brooks moved in with a friend, in Los Angeles. In 1961, after his return to New York, he found that Baum had begun suing him for legal separation. Marriage Is a Dirty Rotten Fraud was an autobiographical script based on his marriage. By 1966, Brooks was "living in a fairly old but comfortable New York town house".

Brooks married actress Anne Bancroft in 1964, and they remained together for 41 years until her death in 2005. They met at a rehearsal for The Perry Como Show in 1961 and were married on August 5, 1964, at the Manhattan Marriage Bureau. Their son, Max Brooks, was born in 1972. In 2010, Brooks credited Bancroft as "the guiding force" behind his involvement in developing The Producers and Young Frankenstein for the musical theater, saying of his first meeting with her: "From that day, until her death ... we were glued together."

He has remained single since she died, stating in 2023 that "Once you are married to Anne Bancroft, others don't seem to be appealing". Brooks said of Bancroft, "She had good taste in everything—except husbands."

According to actor David DeLuise on Wizards of Waverly Pod, Brooks is his godfather; DeLuise's father, Dom DeLuise, was a frequent co-star of Brooks in his earlier career.

On June 28, 2026, Brooks turned 100.

=== Interests ===
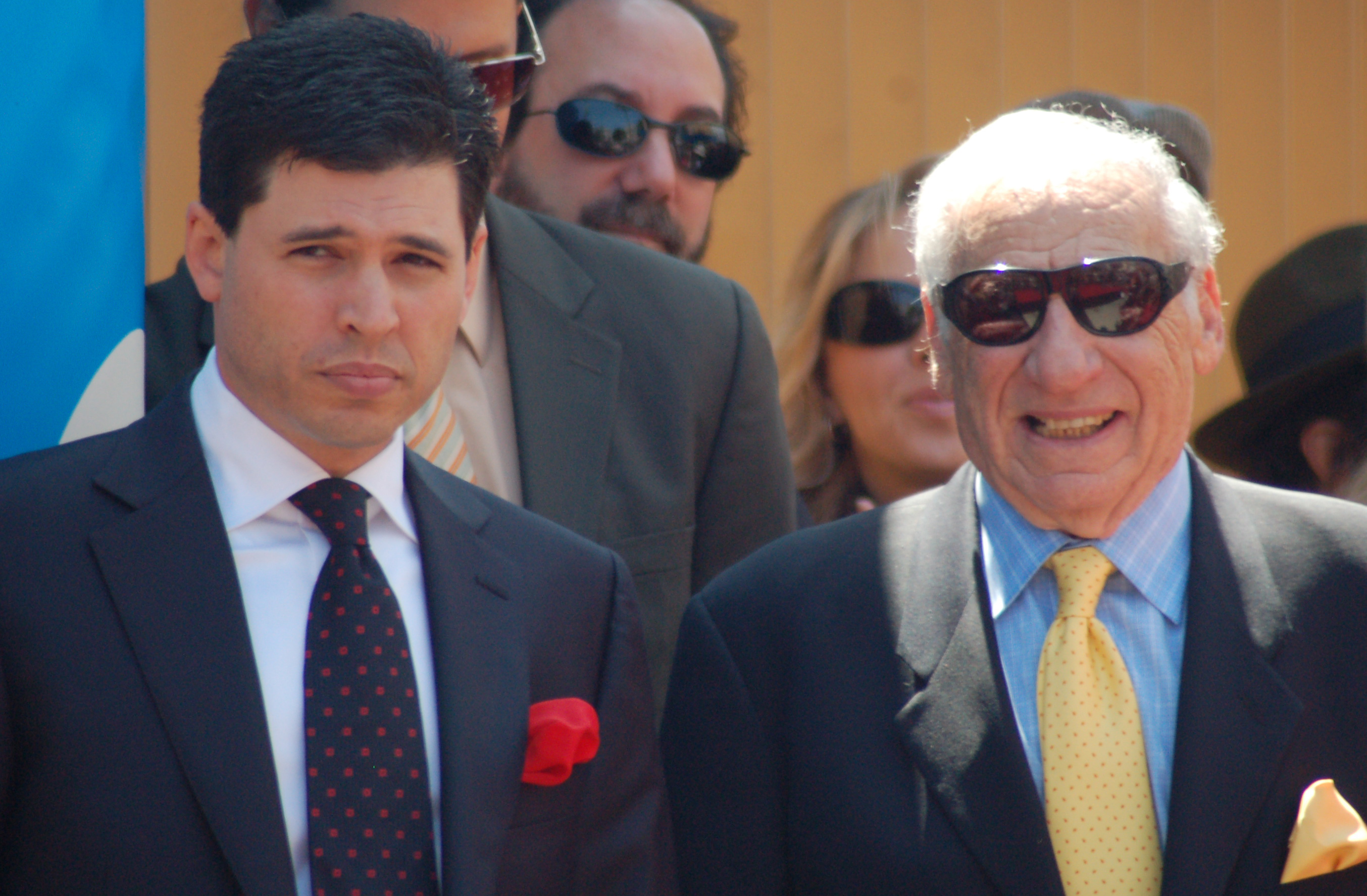
Brooks with son Max in 2010

Brooks is a voracious reader; Kenneth Tynan describes "Brooks the secret connoisseur, worshiper of good writing, and expert on the Russian classics, with special reverence to Gogol, Turgenev, Dostoevski, and Tolstoy." He kept a photograph of Tolstoy above his desk. In The Producers, Bialystock refers to Bloom as "Prince Myshkin", a character from Dostoevsky's The Idiot, and the name Leo Bloom refers to Leopold Bloom, hero of James Joyce's Ulysses. He was a close friend of Joseph Heller, author of Catch-22. The hero of Heller's Good as Gold is partly based on Brooks.

=== Jewish identity ===
Brooks has often expressed pride in being Jewish. In 2021, Brooks told NPR's Terry Gross: "I love being a Jew, I love Jewish humor..."

Regarding religion, Brooks stated, "I'm rather secular. I'm basically Jewish. But I think I'm Jewish not because of the Jewish religion at all. I think it's the relationship with the people and the pride I have. The tribe surviving so many misfortunes, and being so brave and contributing so much knowledge to the world and showing courage". He says "Look at Jewish history: Unrelieved lamenting would be intolerable. So, for every ten Jews beating their breast, God designated one to be crazy and amuse the breast-beaters. By the time I was five I knew I was that one."

On Jewish films, Brooks said, "They can be anything and anywhere ... if there's a tribal thing, like, the 'please God, protect us' feeling ... we don't know where and how it's gonna come out. Avatar was a Jewish movie ... these people on the run, chasing—and being pursued".

=== Political views ===
Brooks endorsed Joe Biden in the 2020 presidential election in his first-ever public endorsement of a political candidate. He endorsed Kamala Harris in the 2024 presidential election.

== Accolades ==
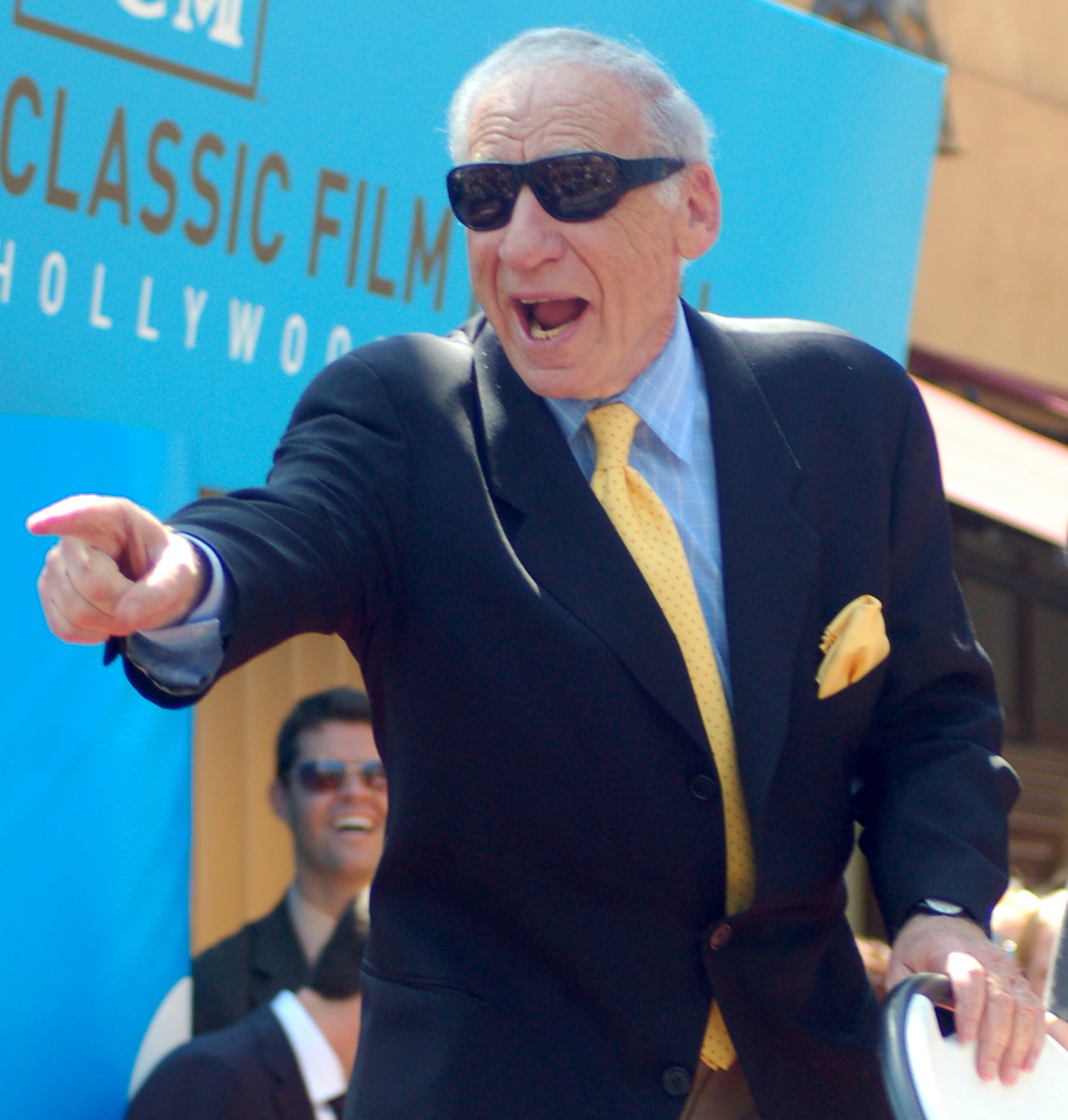
Brooks at his Hollywood Walk of Fame ceremony in 2010

Blazing Saddles, Young Frankenstein and The Producers were selected for preservation in the National Film Registry. He received the Screen Laurel from the Writers Guild of America in 2003.

Brooks is one of the few people to have received an Emmy, Grammy, Oscar and Tony (EGOT). He received Emmys in 1997, 1998 and 1999 for Outstanding Guest Actor in a Comedy Series for his role of Uncle Phil on Mad About You. He and Carl Reiner won a Grammy for Best Spoken Comedy Album for The 2000 Year Old Man in the Year 2000 . He won another in 2002 for Best Musical Show Album for the cast album of The Producers and for Best Long Form Music Video for the DVD Recording the Producers: A Musical Romp with Mel Brooks. He won his Oscar, for Best Original Screenplay in 1968, for The Producers. He won three Tonys, for Best Original Score, Best Book of a Musical and Best Musical for the stage adaptation of The Producers.

Brooks won Hugo and Nebula awards for Young Frankenstein. In a 2005 Channel 4 poll to find The Comedian's Comedian, he was voted No. 50 of the top 50 comedy acts ever by fellow comedians and comedy insiders.

In December 2009, Brooks was feted at the Kennedy Center Honors at the John F. Kennedy Center for the Performing Arts in Washington, DC. He was inducted into the Hollywood Walk of Fame in April 2010, with a motion pictures star located at 6712 Hollywood Boulevard. In 2018, Brooks received the Polish Gold Gloria Artis Medal for Merit to Culture.

The American Film Institute presented Brooks with the AFI Life Achievement Award in June 2013. In 2014 Brooks was honored in a handprint and footprint ceremony at TCL Chinese Theatre. His handprints include a six-fingered left hand as he wore a prosthetic finger when making his prints. In March 2015 he received a British Film Institute Fellowship from the British Film Institute. In 2024, Nathan Lane and Matthew Broderick presented Brooks with an Honorary Oscar. The AFI lists three of Brooks's films on its AFI's 100 Years...100 Laughs list: Blazing Saddles (number 6), The Producers (number 11) and Young Frankenstein (number 13). In 2026, to celebrate Brooks's centenary, it moved Blazing Saddles to first place, displacing Billy Wilder's Some Like It Hot (1959).

== Discography ==
=== Comedy albums ===
- 2000 Years with Carl Reiner and Mel Brooks (World Pacific Records, 1960)
- 2001 Years with Carl Reiner and Mel Brooks (Capitol Records, 1961)
- Carl Reiner and Mel Brooks at the Cannes Film Festival (Capitol Records, 1962)
- 2000 and Thirteen with Carl Reiner and Mel Brooks (Warner Bros. Records, 1973)
- The Incomplete Works of Carl Reiner & Mel Brooks (Warner Bros. Records, 1973)
- Excerpts from The Complete 2000 Year Old Man (Rhino Records, 1994)
- The 2000 Year Old Man in the Year 2000 (Rhino Records, 1997)

=== Soundtracks ===
- The Producers (RCA Victor, 1968)
- High Anxiety – Original Soundtrack (Asylum Records, 1978)
- History of the World, Part I (Warner Bros. Records, 1981)
- To Be or Not to Be (Island Records, 1984)
- The Producers: Original Broadway Recording (Sony Classical, 2001)

== Bibliography ==
- History of the World, Part I (Mel Brooks)
- The 2000 Year Old Man: The Collected Recorded Wisdom of the Venerable Sage in One Fully Illustrated Volume (Mel Brooks, Carl Reiner, illustrations by Leo Salkin)
- The 2000 Year Old Man in the Year 2000: The Book (Mel Brooks and Carl Reiner)
- High Anxiety (Mel Brooks, Ron Clark, Rudy DeLuca, Barry Levinson, novelization by Robert H. Pilpel)
- The Producers: The Book, Lyrics, and Story Behind the Biggest Hit in Broadway History! (Mel Brooks and Tom Meehan)
- The Producers: Voice Line with Piano Accompaniment Format Piano, Vocal and Guitar Chords (Mel Brooks)
- The Producers Songbook: Piano/Vocal Highlights (Mel Brooks)
- Paul on Mazursky (Sam Wasson, with foreword by Mel Brooks)
- Young Frankenstein: The Story of the Making of the Film (Mel Brooks, Rebecca Keegan, with foreword by Judd Apatow)
- All About Me!: My Remarkable Life in Show Business (Mel Brooks)
