= To Be or Not to Be (The Hitler Rap) =

1983 single by Mel Brooks

- UK release artwork

Single by Mel Brooks
- Released: 1983
- Genre: Comedy hip hop
- Length: 7:43 (extended version); 4:35 (single version)
- Label: Island (UK 12IS 158)
- Songwriters: Mel Brooks, Pete Wingfield
- Producer: Pete Wingfield

"To Be or Not to Be (The Hitler Rap)" is a comedy hip hop song recorded by Mel Brooks in 1983 for Island Records. The song appeared on the soundtrack album for the movie of the same name. It was derived from the burlesque show within the film but did not appear within it. It also echoes Brooks's 1967 film The Producers, with the lines "Don't be stupid, be a smarty. Come and join the Nazi Party," taken from the song "Springtime for Hitler".

In the accompanying music video, Brooks is dressed like Adolf Hitler and raps about the key events in Hitler's life in Nazi Germany. The ending makes reference to Hitler's alleged escape to Argentina near the end of World War II.

The song managed to chart high in Australia and the United Kingdom, peaking at number three in the former country and number 12 on the UK Singles Chart. It also reached number one in Norway and number two in Sweden.

== Track listing ==
- 12" single
1. "To Be or Not to Be (The Hitler Rap) (Part 1)" – 7:43
2. "To Be or Not to Be (The Hitler Rap) (Part 2)" (Instrumental Mix) – 7:51

== Charts ==
=== Weekly charts ===
Weekly chart performance for "To Be or Not to Be"
Chart (1983–1984)	Peak position
Australia (Kent Music Report)	3
Belgium (Ultratop 50 Flanders)	23
Germany (GfK)	11
Ireland (IRMA)	8
Italy (TV Sorrisi e Canzoni)	39
New Zealand (Recorded Music NZ)	24
Norway (VG-lista)	1
Sweden (Sverigetopplistan)	2
Switzerland (Schweizer Hitparade)	15
UK Singles (OCC)	12

=== Year-end charts ===
Chart (1984)	Position
Australia (Kent Music Report)	50
