= Alan Johnson (choreographer) =

American choreographer and film director (1937–2018)

- Born: February 18, 1937; Ridley Park, Pennsylvania, U.S.
- Died: July 7, 2018 (aged 81); Los Angeles, California, U.S.
- Occupations: Director; choreographer
- Years active: 1957–2018

Alan Johnson (February 18, 1937 – July 7, 2018) was a three-time Emmy Award-winning American choreographer, best known for his work on Mel Brooks films and for restaging Jerome Robbins' original choreography in live productions of West Side Story in the United States and internationally. Johnson was linked to West Side Story since making his Broadway debut in the show in 1957.

He brought the West Side Story dance style into the mainstream when he choreographed several GAP clothing commercials in 2000. This commercial earned him an American Choreography award. Along with the GAP/WestSide advertisements, Johnson also choreographed commercials for Dubonnet and Freixenet Champagne.

== Relationship with Mel Brooks ==
Johnson choreographed musical numbers in several Brooks films, such as the infamous "Springtime for Hitler" number in The Producers, the "Spanish Inquisition" dance number from the film, History of the World, Part I and "Puttin' On the Ritz" in Young Frankenstein. Johnson also directed Brooks in the 1983 film To Be or Not to Be.

== Filmography ==
=== As choreographer ===
- The Producers (1967)
- Blazing Saddles (1974)
- Young Frankenstein (1974)
- The Adventure of Sherlock Holmes' Smarter Brother (1975)
- Cos (1976) TV Series
- The World's Greatest Lover (1977)
- History of the World, Part I (1981)
- Dracula: Dead and Loving It (1995)

=== As director ===
- To Be or Not to Be (1983)
- Solarbabies (1986)
