= Edwin Justus Mayer =

American screenwriter (1896–1960)

- Born: November 8, 1896; New York, New York, U.S.
- Died: September 11, 1960 (aged 63); New York, New York, U.S.
- Occupation: Screenwriter
- Years active: 1927–1960
- Spouse: Frances O'Neill McIntyre
- Children: Paul Avila Mayer (son)
- Relatives: Daisy von Scherler Mayer (granddaughter)

Edwin Justus Mayer (November 8, 1896 – September 11, 1960) was an American screenwriter. He wrote or co-wrote the screenplays for 47 films between 1927 and 1958.

Edwin Justus Mayer worked on many screenplays but he is notable for his work with Ernst Lubitsch. He worked with Lubitsch on the scripts for To Be or Not to Be (1942) and A Royal Scandal (1945).

== Personal life and family ==
Mayer was born at 71 W. 125th Street in New York City on November 8, 1896, the son of Paul, who was born in Karlovy Vary while the town was part of the Austrian Empire, and Isabella Mayer. He had two siblings, sisters Olga and Estelle. Mayer's draft card for World War I, filled out in either 1917 or 1918, shows that he and his mother lived together at 108 W. 95th Street and that he worked on Broadway in Manhattan. Additionally, the card described him as being of tall and slender build with brown hair and eyes while noting he was blind in his left eye.

Mayer was married to Frances O'Neill (b. ~1900 in Spain) and, by her, had at least two children, one of them being late TV writer and producer Paul Avila Mayer.

== Selected filmography ==
- The Devil Dancer (1927)
- The Love Mart (1927)
- Ned McCobb's Daughter (1928)
- The Divine Lady (1929)
- The Unholy Night (1929)
- Our Blushing Brides (1930)
- Romance (1930)
- Tonight Is Ours (1933)
- Thirty Day Princess (1934)
- The Affairs of Cellini (1934)
- They Met in Bombay (1941)
- To Be or Not to Be (1942)
- A Royal Scandal (1945)
- To Be or Not to Be (1983 - from the 1942 screenplay)
