= The Sid Caesar, Imogene Coca, Carl Reiner, Howard Morris Special =

- Genre: Sketch comedy
- Written by: Mel Brooks; Sam Denoff; Bill Persky; Carl Reiner; Mel Tolkin
- Directed by: Jack Arnold; Bill Hobin
- Starring: Sid Caesar; Imogene Coca; Carl Reiner; Howard Morris; Maggie Peterson
- Country of origin: United States
- Original language: English

Production
- Executive producer: H.F. Green
- Producer: Jack Arnold
- Editor: James E. Brady
- Running time: 55 minutes

Original release
- Network: CBS
- Release: April 5, 1967

The Sid Caesar, Imogene Coca, Carl Reiner, Howard Morris Special was a sketch comedy variety special that aired April 5, 1967 on CBS. The show consisted of the cast of Your Show of Shows reunited to re-enact various sketches. That cast consisted of Sid Caesar, Imogene Coca, Carl Reiner, and Howard Morris. Comedian Maggie Peterson appears as does the Billy Williams Quartet.

At the 19th Primetime Emmy Awards, the special was nominated for three Primetime Emmy Awards, winning two: Outstanding Variety Special and Outstanding Writing for a Variety Special.

== Summary ==
The show comprised the following sketches:

- The four comedians re-enact how they came to work together again.
- Imogene Coca portrays an American tourist in Paris who meets up with another American (Sid Caesar) and the two use a variety of cliches and malaprops as they chat.
- The Billy Williams Quartet sings "That's Life".
- The comedic foursome is joined by Maggie Peterson and perform their own version of "Who's Afraid of Virginia Woolf?" entitled "Who's Afraid of Married Life" in which Imogene Coca does a startling impersonation of Elizabeth Taylor.
- Caesar, Reiner, and Morris as "The Haircuts" recreate their classic spoof of a rock band.
- "Operation Close Quarters," Caesar, Reiner, and Morris portray three Navy men sent beneath the sea for an endurance test.
- Caesar, Coca, Reiner, and Morris perform a spoof of the opera "I Pagliacci" entitled "Gallipacci" in which they combine their unequaled operatic talents with altered versions of popular music.

Source: The Paley Center for Media

== Production ==
The show reunited the cast of Your Show of Shows, which ran from 1950 to 1954.

== Awards and nominations ==
The variety special received three Primetime Emmy Award nominations, winning two: Outstanding Variety Special and Outstanding Writing for a Variety Special.

Year	Award	Category	Nominated work	Result	Ref.
1967	Primetime Emmy Awards	Outstanding Variety Special	Jack Arnold	Won	
1967	Primetime Emmy Awards	Outstanding Writing for a Variety Special	Mel Brooks, Sam Denoff, Bill Persky, Carl Reiner, Mel Tolkin	Won	
1967	Primetime Emmy Awards	Outstanding Directing for a Variety Special	Bill Hobin	Nominated	
