= 2000 Year Old Man =

Carl Reiner/Mel Brooks comedy sketch

Rhino Records' 2000 Year Old Man boxed set of albums one through four

The 2000 Year Old Man is a comedy sketch created by Carl Reiner and Mel Brooks in the 1950s and first publicly performed in the 1960s. Brooks plays a 2000-year-old man, interviewed by Reiner in a series of comedy routines that were turned into a collection of records and also performed on television.

== History ==
The foundation for the routine was laid during production of Your Show of Shows, where Reiner was an actor and Brooks was a writer. Reiner describes the first instance:

I remember the first question I asked him. It was because I had seen a program called We the People Speak, early television. [He puts on an announcer voice] "We the People Speak. Here’s a man who was in Stalin's toilet, heard Stalin say, 'I’m going to blow up the world.' I came in, I said this is good for a sketch. No one else thought so, but I turned to Mel and I said, "Here's a man who was actually seen at the crucifixion 2,000 years ago," and his first words were, "Oh, boy." We all fell over laughing. I said, "You knew Jesus?" "Yeah," he said, "Thin lad, wore sandals, long hair, walked around with 11 other guys. Always came into the store, never bought anything. Always asked for water." Those were the first words, and then for the next hour or two I kept asking him questions, and he never stopped killing us.

It began as a joke between the two that was then shared at parties. Reiner started bringing a tape recorder to the parties as Brooks never said the same thing twice. Numerous people such as George Burns suggested to the two that they put their material on an album, but only Steve Allen managed to coax the two to come record it in his studio. Reiner recalls the moment he and Brooks realized the first album was going to be a hit:

When we made the album, the album came out, we weren't sure yet whether everybody was going to like it. And it was Cary Grant, who was my neighbor at Universal Studios, he came over and I gave him a record and I said the new record came out, you may like this. And he came back a week later, said, Can I have two dozen? I said, What are you going to do with them? He said, I'm going to take them to England. I said, You'll take these to England? He said, Yeah, they speak English there. Anyway, he came back and said, She loved it. I said who? The Queen Mother. I said, You played this in Buckingham Palace? He said yes. And then Mel says, Well, if the biggest shiksa in the world loves it, we're home free.

In 1973, it was reported that Reiner and Brooks would originally perform the routine at their friend Norman Lear's house in Fire Island, New York.

== Sketch ==
Reiner was the straight man, asking interview questions of Brooks, who would improvise answers in a Jewish-American accent. The free-wheeling semi-improvised sketches covered a wide variety of topics from marriage ("I have been married several hundred times") and children ("I have over 42,000 children and not one comes to visit me!") to transportation ("What was the means of transportation then? Mostly fear.").

The quality of the sketch was elevated by the quick improvisational wit of Brooks, who would usually use a question as a springboard to unplanned exposition and tangents that would be as much of a surprise to his partner as it was to the audience. Reiner continued to act as the voice of the audience, providing questions and challenging Brooks' answers. "He was like a district attorney" claims Brooks. Reiner's knowledge of history and momentous events raised the bar on the exchanges. "I knew the questions," quipped Reiner, "but I didn't know the answers." While Reiner deferred the great lines to Brooks, he knew his friend well enough to follow along and cross paths enough to prop him up for more opportunities.

Despite their close friendship, it was acknowledged by 1973 that the 2000 Year Old Man sketch also proved to be a source of "nervous tension" for Brooks and Reiner. By the time the sketch underwent a revival in 1973, Brooks and Reiner had not performed the 2000 Year Old Man on albums in over a decade, with the New York Times noting how even by this point in time that "both say that the need to perform is gone."

== Recordings and performances ==
Their first television appearances performing the sketch were on The Ed Sullivan Show in February 1961 and then on The Steve Allen Show eight months later.

Reiner and Brooks released five comedy albums. The 2000 Year Old Man character appeared on one track for each of the first three albums and the entirety of the final two. However, one side of the 1973 album would only consist of tapes which were recorded when the sketch was performed at Norman Lear's Fire Island, New York home in the 1950s.

1. 2000 Years with Carl Reiner and Mel Brooks (1960)
2. 2000 and One Years with Carl Reiner and Mel Brooks (1961)
3. Carl Reiner and Mel Brooks at the Cannes Film Festival, Capitol W 1815, (1962)
4. 2000 and Thirteen with Carl Reiner and Mel Brooks (Warner Bros. Records, 1973)
5. The 2000 Year Old Man in the Year 2000 (1997)

The 2000 Year Old Man in the Year 2000 was released concurrently with a companion book of the same name. It also won the 1998 Grammy Award for Best Spoken Comedy Album.

There have also been numerous compilation albums such as Best of the 2000 Year Old Man (1968) and Excerpts from The Complete 2000 Year Old Man (Rhino Records, 1994).

=== Animated special ===
2000 Year Old Man
- Genre: Animated television special
- Written by: Mel Brooks; Carl Reiner
- Directed by: Leo Salkin
- Voices of: Mel Brooks; Carl Reiner
- Theme music composer: Mort Garson
- Country of origin: United States
- Original language: English

Production
- Producer: Leo Salkin
- Running time: 30 min
- Production companies: Crossbow Productions; Acre Enterprises; Leo Salkin Films

Original release
- Network: CBS
- Release: January 11, 1975

A half-hour animated television special, The 2000 Year Old Man, premiered January 11, 1975. The dialogue for the special was taken from the live recordings of Reiner and Brooks. This special has since been released on home video. The musical introduction was Bach's Sinfonia to Cantata #29 performed on a Moog synthesizer by Mort Garson.

Most of the jokes were previously heard routines and/or eventually brought to the screen in Brooks' film History of the World, Part I (especially the caveman jokes).

== Legacy ==
=== Home media ===
All five comedy albums were compiled and newly remastered on a 3-CD / 1-DVD box set by Shout! Factory for the 50th anniversary. The 2000 Year Old Man: The Complete History DVD was released November 24, 2009, and features an interview with Reiner and Brooks; the 1975 animated 2000 Year Old Man television special, and clips of the two appearing on The Ed Sullivan Show and The New Steve Allen Show.

The album 2000 Years With Carl Reiner and Mel Brooks was added to the Library of Congress' National Recording Registry as part of its 2008 selections.

=== Appearances in other media ===
Mel Brooks appeared as the 2000 Year Old Man to help celebrate the 2000th episode of the original Jeopardy! hosted by Art Fleming (February 21, 1972), in which the three highest-scoring undefeated champions at that point returned to play an abbreviated game for charities. During his pre-game appearance he recounted how the show was done 2,000 years earlier—"It wasn't this hippy-happy-dappy game you've got here ... the moment you walked out of your cave—Jeopardy!" On the March 17, 2014 (S30E131) airing of the current Jeopardy! hosted by Alex Trebek, Reiner and Brooks read an entire category of clues as their characters.

Brooks adapted the character to create the 2500 Year Old Brewmaster for Ballantine Beer in the 1960s. Interviewed by Dick Cavett in a series of ads, the Brewmaster (in a German accent, as opposed to the 2000 Year Old Man's Jewish voice) said he was inside the original Trojan horse and "could've used a six-pack of fresh air."

In the episode of The Simpsons entitled "Homer vs. Patty and Selma", Brooks appears as himself, riding in a limo being driven by Homer. After Homer incorrectly identifies the act as "The 2000-pound man thing," he and Brooks engage in a brief sketch, with Homer playing the part of Carl Reiner. When Homer is pulled over by the police, Chief Wiggum offers to give Brooks a ride and says they can do "the $2000-Man thing." Brooks agrees, but asks that he not play Reiner's part—"I hate Carl Reiner!", he says.

In an episode of Studio 60 on the Sunset Strip entitled "The Option Period", comedy writer Rick Tahoe uses The 2000 Year Old Man as an example of an ideal comedy sketch.
