= High Anxiety =

1977 film by Mel Brooks

- Theatrical release poster
- Directed by: Mel Brooks
- Written by: Mel Brooks; Ron Clark; Rudy De Luca; Barry Levinson
- Produced by: Mel Brooks
- Starring: Mel Brooks; Madeline Kahn; Cloris Leachman; Harvey Korman; Dick Van Patten; Ron Carey; Howard Morris
- Cinematography: Paul Lohmann
- Edited by: John C. Howard
- Music by: John Morris
- Production company: Crossbow Productions
- Distributed by: 20th Century Fox
- Release date: December 25, 1977
- Running time: 94 minutes
- Country: United States
- Language: English
- Budget: $4 million
- Box office: $31.1 million

High Anxiety is a 1977 American satirical comedy mystery film produced and directed by Mel Brooks, who also plays the lead. This is Brooks' first film as a producer and first speaking lead role (his first lead role was in Silent Movie). Veteran Brooks ensemble members Madeline Kahn, Cloris Leachman and Harvey Korman are also featured. It is a parody of psychoanalysis and Alfred Hitchcock films.

== Plot ==
Arriving at LAX, Dr. Richard Thorndyke has several odd encounters (such as a flasher impersonating a police officer and a passing bus with a full orchestra playing). He is taken by his driver and photographer, Brophy, to the Psycho-Neurotic Institute for the Very, Very Nervous, where he has been hired to replace Dr. Ashley, who died mysteriously—though Brophy suspects foul play. Upon his arrival, Thorndyke is greeted by the staff, Dr. Philip Wentworth, Dr. Charles Montague and Nurse Charlotte Diesel. Thorndyke also reunites with Professor Vicktor Lillolman, a past mentor now employed by the institute. Thorndyke has "high anxiety", which is not helped by the fact that the institute is on the top of an oceanside cliff, though Lillolman offers to help him through it.

Later, Thorndyke hears strange noises coming from Diesel's room and he and Brophy go to investigate. Diesel claims it was the TV but it was actually a passionate session of S&M with Montague. The next morning, Thorndyke is alerted by a light shining through his window, coming from the violent ward. Montague takes Thorndyke to the light's source, the room of patient Arthur Brisbane, who thinks he is a Cocker Spaniel.

Wentworth wants to leave the institute, arguing with Diesel. After she lets him go, he drives home but the radio is rigged to blast deafening rock music. He is trapped in his car, his ears hemorrhage and he dies from a stroke, aggravated by the loud music.

Thorndyke and Brophy travel to San Francisco, where Thorndyke is to speak at a psychiatric convention. He checks into the Hyatt Regency San Francisco, where much to his chagrin, he is assigned a top-floor room, his reservation mysteriously changed by "Mr. MacGuffin". Thorndyke pesters the bellboy Dennis with repeated requests for a newspaper, wanting to look in the obituaries for information about Wentworth's demise. He then takes a shower, during which Dennis enters and, in a frenzy, mimics stabbing Thorndyke with the paper while screaming, "Here's your paper! Happy now?! Happy?" The paper's ink runs down the drain.

After his shower, Victoria Brisbane, the daughter of Arthur Brisbane, bursts through the door, wanting help removing her father from the institute. She claims Diesel and Montague are exaggerating the illnesses of wealthy patients so they can milk rich families of millions (through methods demonstrated earlier). Discovering the patient he met was not the real Arthur, Thorndyke realizes that Dr. Ashley discovered what Diesel and Montague were doing and was killed before he had a chance to fire them; he agrees to help.

To stop Thorndyke, Diesel and Montague hire "Braces", the silver-toothed man behind Ashley's and Wentworth's murders, to impersonate him and shoot a man in the lobby. Thorndyke must prove his innocence to the police. After he is attacked by pigeons in gastrointestinal distress, he meets up with Victoria and realizes Brophy took a picture of the shooting, in which the real Thorndyke was in one of the glass elevators at the time, so he should be in the photo.

Enlarging the photograph, Brophy finds that Thorndyke is indeed visible in it but Diesel and Montague capture Brophy and take him to the North Wing. Meanwhile, "Braces" finds Thorndyke at a phone booth calling Victoria and tries to strangle him; however, Thorndyke kills him with a shard of glass from the booth's broken window. Thorndyke and Victoria head back to Los Angeles where they rescue Brophy and see Montague and Diesel taking the real Arthur Brisbane to a tower to kill him.

Thorndyke's high anxiety prevents him from climbing the tower's steep stairs to help Brisbane, but with Lillolman's help, he overcomes his phobia. Thorndyke knocks Norton the orderly out a tower window, saving Brisbane. Diesel leaps out from the shadows and attacks Thorndyke with a broom but falls out the tower window, laughing hysterically and riding the broom to her death on the rocky coast below. Montague appears from the shadows and gives up before being accidentally knocked unconscious by a trapdoor being opened. Victoria is reunited with Arthur, marries Thorndyke and they embark on their honeymoon.

== Cast ==
- Mel Brooks as Dr. Richard Harpo Thorndyke. Throughout the film, Thorndyke has and attempts to overcome a nervous disorder called "high anxiety", a sort of mix of acrophobia and vertigo.
- Madeline Kahn as Victoria Brisbane, daughter of Arthur Brisbane. She teams up with Thorndyke to save her father, whom she believes to be held at the institute against his will.
- Cloris Leachman as Nurse Charlotte Diesel. She schemes to institutionalize wealthy people, claim they are mentally ill, and extort millions of dollars from their families.
- Harvey Korman as Dr. Charles Montague. Smarmy and pompous, he is in cahoots with Diesel and is submissive in his relationship with her.
- Ron Carey as Brophy, an avid photographer who is also Thorndyke's driver and sidekick
- Howard Morris as Professor Vicktor Lillolman, Thorndyke's mentor who diagnosed him with the disorder "high anxiety"
- Dick Van Patten as Dr. Philip Wentworth, a meek doctor who wants nothing to do with the institute's illegal activities
- Jack Riley as a Hyatt Regency San Francisco desk clerk
- Charlie Callas as a demented patient who thinks he is a Cocker Spaniel
- Ron Clark as Zachary Cartwright, a patient believed to be deranged. Clark also worked as a writer on the film.
- Rudy De Luca as "Braces", an assassin hired by Diesel to murder Wentworth and Thorndyke. De Luca also worked as a writer on the film.
- Barry Levinson as Dennis, the bellhop. Levinson also worked as a writer on the film.
- Lee Delano as Norton, an orderly working for Diesel and Montague. He has half a mustache because a patient supposedly attacked him.

== Production ==
The film is a parody of the suspense films of Alfred Hitchcock: Spellbound, Vertigo, Psycho and The Birds. The film was dedicated to Hitchcock and Mel Brooks consulted Hitchcock when writing the screenplay. It also contains parodies of Michelangelo Antonioni's Blowup and Orson Welles' Citizen Kane, in the camera tracking through walls and even James Bond films with Braces (Rudy De Luca), an assassin who shares a similarity with the Bond villain Jaws, played by Richard Kiel.

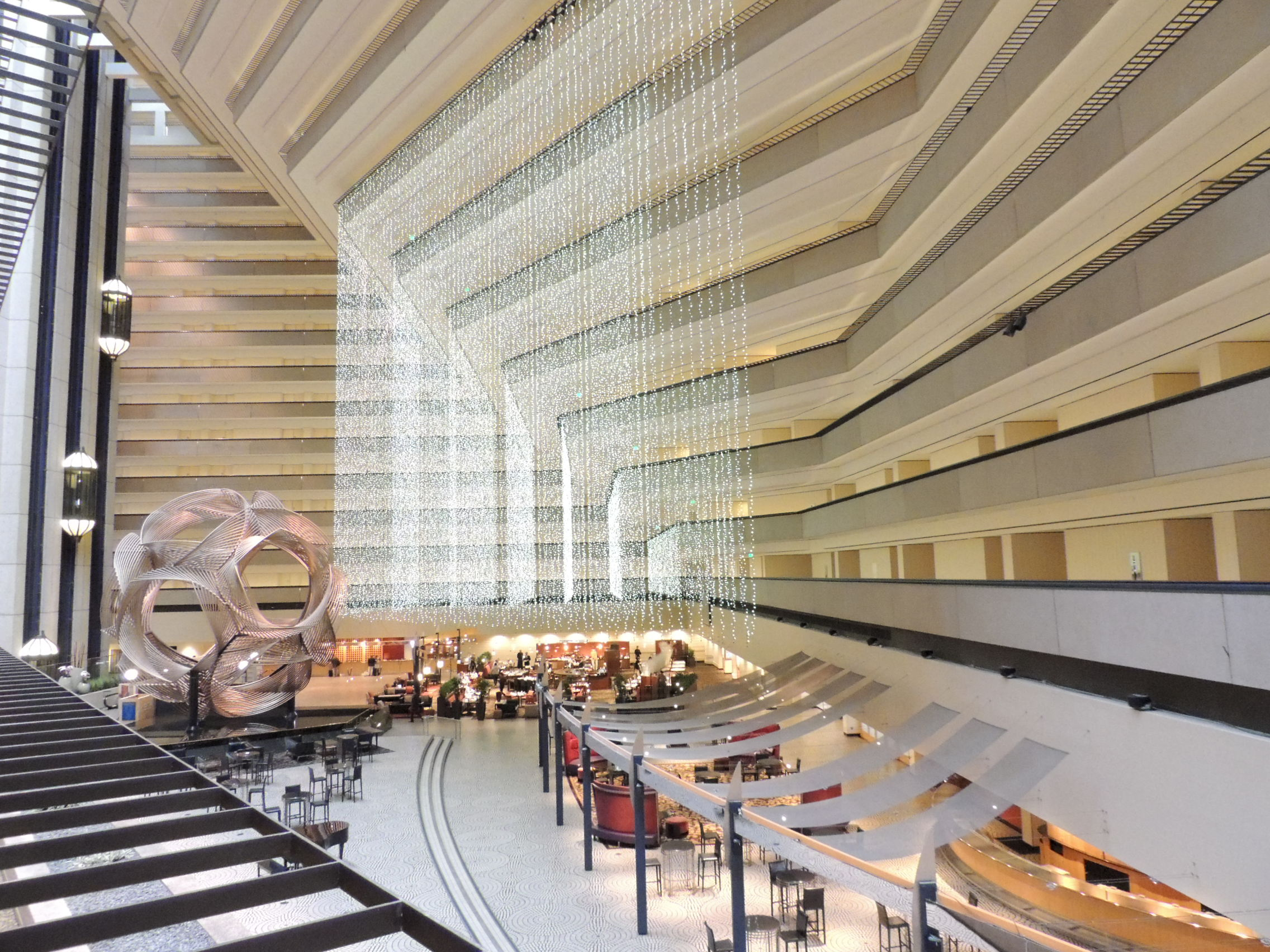
The lobby of the Hyatt Regency San Francisco features prominently in the film

Most of the story takes place at the fictional Psycho-Neurotic Institute for the Very, Very Nervous, with exteriors filmed at Mount St. Mary's University in Los Angeles. Los Angeles International Airport also appears at the beginning of the film. Near the middle of the movie, the story moves to San Francisco, taking advantage of settings used in Hitchcock's Vertigo, including the Golden Gate Bridge and the Mission San Juan Bautista tower. It also includes the then-new Hyatt Regency Hotel with its tall atrium lobby.

Brooks took great pains to not only parody Hitchcock films, but also to emulate the look and style of his pictures. In an interview he said, "I watch the kind of film we're making with the [director of photography], so he knows not to be frivolous. He's got to get the real lighting, the real texture. For High Anxiety, it was 'What is a Hitchcock film? What does it look like? What does it feel like? How does he light them? How long is a scene? What is the cutting? When does he bring things to a boil?' We just watch everything."

== Reception ==
On the review aggregator website Rotten Tomatoes, the film holds an approval rating of 73% based on 33 reviews. The website's critics consensus reads, "Uneven but hilarious when it hits, this spoof of Hitchcock movies is a minor classic in the Mel Brooks canon." Metacritic, which uses a weighted average, assigned the film a score of 55 out of 100, based on five critics, indicating "mixed or average" reviews.

Roger Ebert gave the film two-and-a-half stars out of four and wrote, "One of the problems with Mel Brooks' High Anxiety is that it picks a tricky target: It's a spoof of the work of Alfred Hitchcock, but Hitchcock's films are often funny themselves. And satire works best when its target is self-important." Vincent Canby of The New York Times agreed, writing that the film "is as witty and as disciplined as Young Frankenstein, though it has one built-in problem: Hitchcock himself is a very funny man. His films, even at their most terrifying and most suspenseful, are full of jokes shared with the audience. Being so self-aware, Hitchcock's films deny an easy purchase to the parodist, especially one who admires his subject the way Mr. Brooks does. There's nothing to send up, really." Pauline Kael of The New Yorker shared the same objection, writing that "Brooks seems to be under the impression that he's adding a satirical point of view, but it's a child's idea of satire; imitation, with a funny hat and a leer. Hitchcock's suspense melodramas are sparked by his perverse wit; they're satirical to start with." Gene Siskel gave the film three stars out of four and wrote that the parodies of Psycho and The Birds "are clever, funny, and recommend the film." He also wrote, however, that too much of the film "is piddled away with juvenile sex jokes" that "are simply beneath a comic mind as fertile as the one that belongs to Mel Brooks."

Charles Champlin of the Los Angeles Times called it "probably the most coherent of the Brooks movies since The Producers, in the sense of sustaining a tone and story line and characterizations from start to finish. As an homage, it is both knowing and reverential. As such, it is I suppose also the quietest of the Brooks films, with fewer bellylaughs and more appreciative chuckles." Gary Arnold of The Washington Post wrote, "The film rarely rises above the level of tame, wayward homage ... Despite its occasional bright ideas, the movie lacks a unifying bright idea about how to exploit the cast in a sustained, organically conceived parody of Hitchcock. The script is plot-heavy, yet it fails to contrive an amusing plot from Hitchcock sources." In addition to parodying Hitchcock films, High Anxiety became noteworthy for frequently mocking popular psychoanalysis theories at the time, with New Statesman journalist Ryan Gilbey stating that "viewers were familiar enough with the babble and buzzwords of psychoanalysis to respond instinctively to the film's wittiest sequence, when Brooks' speech at a psychiatric conference has to be spontaneously modified so as not to impinge upon the innocence of two young children who have joined the audience. 'Penis envy' becomes 'pee-pee envy'; the womb is temporarily rechristened 'the woo-woo.'"

Before its release, Brooks held a private screening for Hitchcock and feared the worst when Hitchcock did not react while watching and ultimately left without saying a word. Days later, Hitchcock would send Brooks a case of wine and a note of his approval: “A small token of my pleasure, have no anxiety about this.”
