= To Be or Not to Be (1983 film) =

Film by Alan Johnson

- Theatrical release poster
- Directed by: Alan Johnson
- Screenplay by: Ronny Graham; Thomas Meehan
- Story by: Melchior Lengyel; Ernst Lubitsch
- Based on: To Be or Not to Be; 1942 film by: Edwin Justus Mayer
- Produced by: Mel Brooks
- Starring: Mel Brooks; Anne Bancroft; Tim Matheson; Charles Durning; José Ferrer; George Gaynes; Christopher Lloyd; George Wyner; Lewis J. Stadlen; Jack Riley
- Cinematography: Gerald Hirschfeld
- Edited by: Alan Balsam
- Music by: John Morris
- Production company: Brooksfilms
- Distributed by: 20th Century Fox
- Release date: December 16, 1983
- Running time: 107 minutes
- Country: United States
- Languages: English, Polish
- Budget: $9 million
- Box office: $13 million

To Be or Not to Be is a 1983 American war comedy film directed by Alan Johnson, produced by Mel Brooks, and starring Brooks, Anne Bancroft, Tim Matheson, Charles Durning, Christopher Lloyd, and José Ferrer. The screenplay was written by Ronny Graham and Thomas Meehan, based on the original story by Melchior Lengyel, Ernst Lubitsch and Edwin Justus Mayer. The film is a remake of the 1942 film of the same name.

== Plot ==
Frederick Bronski runs a large ensemble show out of Warsaw. Despite the relative success the show receives, the majority of the cast are annoyed by the fact that Frederick nitpicks who does what, in particular his wife Anna, whom he regularly tries to undermine despite her getting the lion's share of audience praise. This leads her to begin a flirtation with bomber pilot Andre Sobinski, whom she invites to come to her dressing room when Frederick begins the "To be, or not to be" speech from Hamlet. Their fling is cut short by the Nazi invasion of Poland, forcing Sobinski to return to his squadron.

As the Bronski Theater struggles to remain open in spite of Gestapo censorship, Sobinski and the rest of the Royal Air Force's Polish squadron commiserate with Polish radio broadcaster Dr. Siletski, who tells them he is returning to Poland and talks them into giving him messages to family members and members of the Polish Underground. However, when Siletski fails to recognize Anna Bronski's name, despite having claimed to have lived in Warsaw, Sobinski becomes suspicious. He consults with British intelligence, who realize that Siletski is a Nazi sympathizer who intends to deliver the names to the Gestapo. Sobinski air drops into Warsaw and meets up with Anna and Frederick, who have been forced to move in with Anna's dresser Sasha after their home was turned into Gestapo Headquarters.

After arriving in Warsaw, Siletski has Anna brought to his room at the former Europa Hotel (which was turned into German Military Headquarters) to ask her about Sobinski's personal message. Convinced that it has no military significance, he invites Anna to return for dinner. Returning home, Anna explains the situation to Frederick and Sobinski, and realizing that Siletski and Gestapo leader Colonel Erhardt have never met, they decide that Frederick will pose as Erhardt. Actors dressed as Gestapo members interrupt Anna's date with Siletski and take him to "headquarters," the Bronski Theater. Frederick successfully retrieves the list from Siletski but unwittingly blows his cover when he reacts to news of Anna's liaisons with Sobinski. Siletski tries to escape through the theater, but Sobinski shoots him down. This forces Frederick to pose as Siletski to retrieve a copy of the list and get Anna out of the hotel. Gestapo Captain Schultz is also there to bring Siletski to Colonel Erhardt's office. Frederick is able to fool Erhardt by naming recently executed prisoners as the leaders of the Polish Underground.

Nazi soldiers invade the theater to arrest Sasha for being homosexual, and when Anna and the others try to protect him, the theater is closed. Anna is taken to Gestapo headquarters under Erhardt's orders, so Frederick again disguises as Siletski to try and retrieve her, unaware that the Germans have discovered Siletski's body. After Frederick arrives, Ehrhardt leaves him in a room with Siletsky's dead body. Frederick has an extra fake beard, shaves off Siletsky's beard and applies the fake. He then goads Ehrhardt into pulling it off, convincing Ehrhardt that he is the real Siletsky and securing Sasha's release. Unaware of Ehrhardt's successful scheme, several actors disguised as Hitler's safety squad arrive, yank off Frederick's fake beard and pretend to drag out Frederick and Sasha.

Knowing the ruse won't be able to hold for much longer, Sobinski and the Bronski Theater troupe plan to use a special performance for the visiting Hitler as a smokescreen to get themselves (and the Jewish refugees Frederick has unwittingly sheltered) out of Occupied Poland. Despite hiccups in the performance everyone makes it out of the theater. Anna does not show up at the stage door because Ehrhardt has cornered her in her dressing room, but when Frederick comes to get her disguised as Hitler, Ehrhardt panics and lets her go. At the airport German security spots the costumed troupe members and catch on to the deception, but Sobinski pilots the plane off the ground and over to England. In gratitude for their heroics, the British government allows the Bronskis to perform in London where, to Frederick and Sobinski's horror, another young soldier stands and walks out on Frederick's "To be or not to be" speech.

== Cast ==
- Mel Brooks as Frederick Bronski
- Anne Bancroft as Anna Bronski
- Charles Durning as SS Colonel Erhardt
- Christopher Lloyd as SS Captain Schultz
- Tim Matheson as Lieutenant Andrei Sobinski
- José Ferrer as Professor Siletski
- Ronny Graham as Sondheim, Stage Manager
- Estelle Reiner as Gruba
- Jack Riley as Dobish
- Lewis J. Stadlen as Lupinsky
- George Gaynes as Ravitch
- George Wyner as Ratkowski
- Earl Boen as Dr. Boyarski
- Ivor Barry as General Hobbs
- William Glover as Major Cunningham
- James Haake as Sasha
- Marley Sims as Rifka
- Max Brooks as Rifka's son
- Larry Rosenberg as Rifka's husband
- Milt Jamin as Gestapo soldier
- Wolf Muser as Desk sergeant
- Henry Brandon as Nazi officer
- Tucker Smith as Klotski's Klown
- Curt Lowens as Airport officer
- Terence Marsh as Startled British officer
- Paul Ratliff as Naval officer
- Scott Beach as Narrator

== Connections with the original ==
This remake is mostly faithful to the 1942 film on which it is based and, in many cases, dialogue is taken verbatim from the earlier film. The characters of Bronski and Joseph Tura are, however, combined into a single character (played by Brooks). The character of the treacherous Professor Siletsky (here spelled Siletski) is made into a more comic, even somewhat buffoonish, figure; in the original he was the only completely serious character. Instead of having the company preparing for Hamlet, Bronski performs his "world famous, in Poland" highlights from Hamlet, including the To Be or Not To Be soliloquy, from which the film's name is taken. Anna's dresser has been replaced with Sasha, allowing them to address the plight of gay people who were also persecuted under the Nazis.

== Reception ==
Roger Ebert's three-star review stated that in the film, Mel Brooks "combines a backstage musical with a wartime romance and comes up with an eclectic comedy that races off into several directions, usually successfully." Gene Siskel awarded two-and-half stars and wrote that the film "contains more genuine sentiment than big laughs. If you are looking for laughs, as I was the first time I saw it, you may be disappointed. More often than not the jokes just lay there, a beat late, easily anticipated. On a second viewing, however, the sentiment of the piece rings true, particularly the troupe's final theatrical confrontation with an all-Nazi audience." (On their annual If We Picked the Winners Oscar special the next year, both Siskel and Ebert chose Charles Durning's Oscar nomination as the worst nomination of that year, believing that he took a slot that could have gone to any of the cast members of The Right Stuff or to Jeff Daniels for his performance in Terms of Endearment.)

Vincent Canby called it "smashingly funny. I'm not at all sure that it's a classic, but it's so good in its own right, in the way it preserves and revives the wonderfully farcical Edwin Justus Mayer screenplay, that you leave the theater having a brand-new high." Variety called it "very funny stuff indeed," adding, "Durning is a standout as the buffoonish Gestapo topper and Bancroft's pseudo-seduction of him, and Ferrer, are among the pic's highlights." Kevin Thomas of the Los Angeles Times thought that the film did not work "on two formidable counts. First, Brooks and his associates could never be accused of having anything remotely resembling a Lubitsch touch: that celebrated, indefinable combination of wit, subtlety and sophistication that allowed the legendary Berlin-born director to get away with implying just about anything, although even he was accused of bad taste in making his 'To Be Or Not To Be.' Second, we know far more than was known in 1942 of the full extent of the Nazi evil, especially in regard to the fate of the Jews ... Somehow an entire movie that depicts the Nazis as the buffoons of fantasy, while we know full well that the peril of Brooks' largely Jewish acting company is all too real, isn't very funny but instead is merely crass." Gary Arnold of The Washington Post wrote that "Brooks embarks on an unnecessary remake and then fails to tailor the material adequately to a 1980s perspective or his own performing strengths ... the result is a klunky, tacky-looking color reproduction of the original." David Ansen of Newsweek stated, "To those who know and love the Jack Benny-Carole Lombard original, this may seem like sacrilege. But because the copy is so entertaining in its own right, it seems more a tribute than a rip-off ... Do not expect the usual Brooksian ka-ka jokes and mad non sequiturs: this is his warmest, most plotbound and traditional movie. It may be a twice-told tale, but it's nice to know that delight can strike twice in the same spot."

It has a 55% rating on Rotten Tomatoes based on 22 reviews, indicating "Rotten." Metacritic, which uses a weighted average, assigned the film a score of 61 out of 100, based on 15 critics, indicating "generally favorable" reviews.

However, the film was not a great commercial success, grossing only $13,030,214.

== Accolades ==
Award	Category	Nominee(s)	Result
Academy Awards	Best Supporting Actor	Charles Durning	Nominated
Golden Globe Awards	Best Actress in a Motion Picture – Musical or Comedy	Anne Bancroft	Nominated
Golden Globe Awards	Best Supporting Actor – Motion Picture	Charles Durning	Nominated
Nastro d'Argento	Best Foreign Actor	Mel Brooks	Nominated
Nastro d'Argento	Best Foreign Actress	Anne Bancroft	Nominated
Writers Guild of America Awards	Best Comedy – Adapted from Another Medium	Thomas Meehan and Ronny Graham	Nominated
