= Adi Pherozeshah Marzban =

Indian Gujarati Parsi playwright (1914–1987)

- Born: 17 April 1914; Mumbai, Maharashtra, India
- Died: February 1987 (aged 72); Mumbai, India
- Occupation: Theatre personality
- Spouse: Silla
- Awards: Padma Shri (1964); Sangeet Natak Akademi Award (1970)

Adi Pherozeshah Marzban (1914–1987) was an Indian Gujarati Parsi playwright, actor, director, broadcaster known for his efforts in modernizing Parsi theatre. He was awarded the Padma Shri, the fourth highest civilian award of India in 1964 and Sangeet Natak Akademi Award in 1970.

== Early life ==
Adil Marzban was born in Bombay (now Mumbai) on 17 April 1914 to Pherozeshah Jehangir Marzban, a dramatist who wrote under the nom de plume, Pijam and the author of plays such as Mazandaran, Maasi no Maako and Makhai Mohoro. Born in the lineage of Fardunjee Marzban, the founder of Jam-e-Jamshed and Mumbai Samachar, both Gujarati newspapers, he did his schooling at Bharda New High School and graduated from Elphinstone College in 1933. It was during this time, he met his future producer and colleague, Pesi Khandavala. He started his career as a publicity officer for Western India Theatres but left the job to take up the editorial work of his family newspaper, Jam-e-Jamshed, in 1936, simultaneously working for Gupsup, a monthly humour magazine.

== Career ==
Marzban started directing plays at the turn of the 1950s and staged plays such as Sacred Flame, Time and the Conways, Hawk Island, The Curious Savage and The Little Hut in English and Fasela Ferozeshah and Hasta Gher Vasta in Gujarati. In 1953, receiving a scholarship from UNESCO, he went to Pasadena Playhouse in the United States for advanced training in theatre arts. Returning to India, he joined Kala Kendra at Bharatiya Vidya Bhavan and wrote and directed Piroja Bhavan in 1954, a landmark event in Parsi theatre and his first collaboration with Pesi Khandavala. The play, a commercial success, shifted the focus of Parsi theatre from historical dramas to farces and comedies and featured such renowned technicians as Burjor Mistry, Anand Pai and Shahdeo. He and his manager, Pesi Khandalawala, were pioneers of paying and profit sharing with the members of an amateur theatre group.

Marzban was active in drama societies such as Amateur Dramatic Circle, Theatre Group, the Indian People's Theatre Association, The Bombay Players, The Players Guild and Parsee Arts Circle and brought together many known theatre personalities like William Linford, Oovernaya Burekhan, Jimmy Pocha, Bachi Chaina, Homi Narielwala, Naju Bhabha, Jehangir Anklesaria, Aloo Dubash, Piloo Sethna and Coomi Karani. He is known to have staged over 100 plays in Parsi language and wrote several TV programmes such as Aavo Mari Sathe and the quiz series, What's the Good Word? His weekly radio show Buddhi Dhan Shak Mandal (Association for Dhan Shak) with C. C. Mehta on the All India Radio became popular with listeners for which he had written around 5000 scripts.

He was a trained musician and could play the piano, guitar, clarinet, keyboards and ukulele. He also learned painting under Walter Langhammer, an Austrian painter.

He was proficient in magic, ventriloquism and Western dance which he used to share with his fellows. He used to improvise the dialogues in plays during rehearsals and had a great sense of comic timing. His plays were known for the scene and light design as well as music. Due to his experience in journalism, his plays were natural, socially relevant and well crafted.

His most successful productions were Katariyun Gap (The Head Is Lost), Ardhi Rate Ahat (Knock at Midnight), Kaka Thaya Vanka (Uncle Behaves Funny), Behram ni Sasu (Behram's Mother-in-law), Mota Dil na Bava (Large-hearted Elder), and English plays like Brandon Thomas's Charley's Aunt and J. B. Priestley's An Inspector Calls. Ah! Norman (adapted from Norman, Is That You? by Ron Clark and Sam Bobrick, 1972) was a massive hit among the audience.

He trained several young actor-directors like Phiroz Antia, Homi Tawadia, Burjor Patel and Ruby Patel, and Hosi Vasunia, who continued the theatre (including Parsi theatre) tradition.

He also wrote the screenplay for the film, On Wings of Fire, a film on the history of Zoroastrianism directed by Cyrus Bharucha, featuring Zubin Mehta. He also wrote script of Carnival Queen (1955), an action film starring Fearless Nadia.

Marzban was married to Silla, a TV personality and a littérateur, and the couple resided at Chapsey Terrace, along Altamount Road in Mumbai. A smoker, Marzban was diagnosed with lung cancer which forced him to quit the habit and in February 1987, he died at the age of 72, succumbing to the disease.

== Recognition ==
The Government of India awarded him the fourth highest civilian honour of Padma Shri in 1964 and he received the Sangeet Natak Akademi award in 1970.

== Major productions ==
The first notable play from Marzban was a thriller by name, Ardhi Raate Aafat. This was followed by a spate of productions, serious plays, comedies, and farces.

- Piroja Bhavan
- Sacred Flame
- Time and the Conways
- Hawk Island
- The Curious Savage
- The Little Hut
- Fasela Ferozeshah
- Hasta Gher Vasta
- Sagan ke Vagan
- Mancherji Konna
- Asha Nirasha.
- Jeevan Khel
- Paani ma Parela Pervezji
- Ari Bethela Erachshah
- Dinshahji na Dabba Gul
- Ban Parela Bomanji
- Katariyun gap (The Head Is Lost)
- Ardhi rate ahat (Knock at Midnight)
- Kaka thaya vanka (Uncle Behaves Funny)
- Behramni sasu (Behram's Mother- in-law)
- Mota dilna bava (Large-hearted Elder)
- Shapurji Na Tapela Saaf
- Charleys Aunt
- Inspector Calls

Silla, his wife, has set up an endowment in Marzban's honour under the name, Adi Marzban Endowment Fund, under the aegis of the National Centre for the Performing Arts.

== See also ==
- Zoroastrianism in India
- Fardunjee Marzban
- Jam-e-Jamshed
- Mumbai Samachar
- Pasadena Playhouse
- Parsi theatre
