= Hosi Vasunia =

Theatre actor (1939–2005)

- Born: 8 October 1939; Kobe, Japan
- Died: 10 August 2005 (aged 65); Mumbai, India
- Occupation: Actor

Hosi Hormusji Vasunia (8 October 1939 – 10 August 2005), known popularly as Hosi Vasunia, was an Indian theatre personality and film and television actor. He acted in the English theatre in Bombay (now, Mumbai); he also appeared in Gujarati plays and in Hindi films and television. He was part of the flourishing of drama in Mumbai in the 1970s and 1980s and 1990s and continued the long tradition of Parsi theatre in India.

== Career ==
=== Early life ===
Hosi Vasunia was the younger son of Hormusji Pirojshaw Vasunia and Amy Hormusji Vasunia (née Amy Pestonji Tata). His older brother was named Bomi.

Hosi was born in Kobe, Japan, into an Indian Parsi family long involved in trade with China and Japan. In the 1930s, the family firm had offices in Hong Kong and Canton under the name J. P. Vasunia & Co., and in Shanghai and Kobe under the name Vasunia & Co. The company handled the import and export of silk, cotton, and other commodities. Pirojshaw Jeejeebhoy Vasunia and E. F. Kavarana jointly established the Bombay office and gave it the name E. F. Kavarana & Co. Hosi Vasunia himself worked in the Bombay office of E. F. Kavarana & Co. for some years, before the family firm was disbanded.

=== Early career ===
Hosi Vasunia grew up in Mumbai and attended St. Xavier's School and Sydenham College.

Vasunia credited a Spanish Jesuit priest in his school St. Xavier's for introducing him to the theatre. An early appearance for Vasunia was in Princes (1970), a play written by Gieve Patel and directed by Pearl Padamsee. The play was reviewed as "a moving portrait of the dying fortunes of a proud Parsi family", and the cast also included Pearl Padamsee herself, Yasmin Richmond, Alyque Padamsee, and Erna Vatchaghandy. Vasunia's first line in that play was "Chicken, top chicken!" In 1971, Vasunia appeared in Cyrus the Great in a role (Cyrus' commander-in-chief) for which he received the first of many favourable reviews ("excellently portrayed"), in this case by the drama critic of the Times of India.

The play that established Vasunia's arrival on the English stage in Bombay was Ah! Norman (adapted from Norman, Is That You? by Ron Clark and Sam Bobrick). Sam Kerawala, who later became a close friend and frequent collaborator, recommended Vasunia to the director Adi Marzban after recalling Vasunia's performance in a play from his Sydenham College days. Marzban cast him in Ah! Norman, and Vasunia's career was launched. Ah! Norman enjoyed a great success (over 100 performances) and was revived several times. That play, first performed in Mumbai in 1972, is "credited with having created a new theatre-going audience in the city". Marzban was an early mentor for Vasunia, who appeared under his direction in several plays. Some years after Vasunia's death, he and Marzban were both remembered in the Hindustan Times as "two iconic Mumbai directors".

Vasunia appeared in Loot, by Joe Orton, in 1971. The play was revived, in 1984, with the film actor Amjad Khan acting alongside Vasunia. The play returned to the Mumbai stage, a decade and more later, after the deaths of Amjad and Hosi, in a bilingual English and Hindi version. Imtiaz Khan, Amjad's brother, remained the director across the different versions of the play.

=== Subsequent career and production company ===
Vasunia appeared regularly with Ruby Patel in a string of plays in the 1970s and 1980s. According to the director Vivek Vaswani, they acted together in "15 consecutive hits". Vasunia also collaborated with Burjor Patel, Ruby's husband, and they together co-produced a number of successful plays under the banner "Hosi Vasunia Productions". Their first play was Don't Drink the Water, which was staged in 1979 and based on a script by Woody Allen; the production was directed by Pearl Padamsee.

Although Vasunia was famous for comedy, he was responsible for "serious" theatre including such plays as All the King's Men (in which he was directed by Alyque Padamsee), Whose Life Is It Anyway?, Mass Appeal, Saint Joan, and Agnes of God.

One of Vasunia's last roles was opposite Sabira Merchant in The Rummy Game. The play, directed by Kerawala, was adapted by Bachi Karkaria from D. L. Coburn's Gin Game and was staged in Dubai, London, Antwerp, Düsseldorf, Paris, Chicago, and New York as well as numerous cities in India. The play was revived in 2010 as The Game, with Alyque Padamsee in Vasunia's role.

=== Film and other work ===
Vasunia appeared in only a handful of films and preferred the theatre to film. According to Bhawana Somaaya, the editor of Screen, "Yash Chopra had offered him roles in his various films but he didn’t take them up."

In 1989, Vasunia and Ronnie Screwvala founded the Dynasty Culture Club, which offered a range of entertainment such as theatre, cinema, music, and dance. The Club put on regular events for members, who were charged an annual subscription. Vasunia, however, left the venture after some two years. Screwvala also acted alongside Vasunia in several plays and spoke later of Vasunia's "good and tough and resilient side... Whatever the adversity there was always a smile on his face... He had the ability to constantly motivate people".

Vasunia was closely associated for many years with the National Centre for the Performing Arts (N.C.P.A.) in Mumbai. He was a consultant to the organization, and many of his plays were staged in its theatres.

Vasunia was also a consultant to the Indian Express group and the producer of its annual Screen Awards for excellence in Indian cinema.

== Reviews ==
Of his role in Never Too Late (1977), the drama critic of the Times of India wrote, "Hosi Vasunia is dominant as usual . . . A great performance. Don't underrate his talent: despite his sustained tempo and voice power, he is a master of modulation, a thespian of genuine artistic merit, a man with a look that can freeze you or make you roar." In following year, the paper's drama critic, reviewing Cactus Flower, said Vasunia was "now the tallest giant of the English stage", and added, "You can't beat this guy at verbal pratfalls, double-takes, a voice with a marvellous range and tone, an utterly mobile face which conveys a thousand expressions (not all at once)." Vasunia was said to be "particularly stylish and impressive" in Deathtrap. The reviewer of Tribute, in 1989, said that the play "should not be missed, especially for Vasunia's exuberant performance as Scottie Templeton". Vasunia's flair and style were regularly regarded as distinctive and memorable. A reviewer of his female impersonation in Charley's Aunt said that Vasunia "strikes a delicious balance between high camp and inspired comic restraint". The review added that while there were "unintentional lapses into his own familiar stage persona", the role was nonetheless "one of his best achievements".

Sabira Merchant, a fellow actor and close friend, said that he had the "perfect timing" for comedy. In 2001, Merchant and Vasunia were themselves described, by Deepa Gahlot, as "two of the finest talents on the city's English stage".

== Legacy and awards ==
Vasunia was the recipient of numerous tributes on his death. The Afternoon newspaper described him as "an amazing director, producer, and an impresario". The actor and director, Feroz Khan, said, "Hosi was one of the finest actors in English theatre and his absence is going to be a huge loss to us. He was a friend, a colleague and more than anything he was the most charming and dependable person in the fraternity. We have lost a gentleman." Vaswani said, "My comedy career started because Hosi agreed to direct the first play I produced. . . He was genuinely the nicest person in English theatre in Mumbai." Farid Currim remembered him as "one of the most unselfish actors on Mumbai's English theatre circuit" and recalled "the way he'd drive the audience crazy in terms of laughter". The actor Shernaz Patel said, "I grew up watching Vasunia on stage. I remember he would walk on the stage and the audience would start applauding."

At a memorial for Vasunia, held at the N.C.P.A. on 23 August 2005, many of his old colleagues and friends recalled his achievements and character. Alyque Padamsee spoke about his "joie de vivre, intensity and charisma", while Cyrus Broacha, who was given a career break by Vasunia in the play Brighton Beach Memoirs, said that "he learned to embrace theatre as a community from his mentor". In another appreciation, Somaaya said, "He was special and he knew it. That is why he never played it safe. He always expressed what he felt, without mincing words."

He was presented the Lifetime Achievement Award by the theatre group Thespo posthumously, in December 2005, for "his dedication to the theatre as an actor and producer".

== Stage ==
=== Actor ===
- Princes
- Cyrus the Great
- Ah! Norman
- Loot
- Move Over Mrs
- The Subject Was Roses
- My Darling Daughter
- Never Too Late
- Cactus Flower
- Don't Drink the Water
- Deathtrap
- A Flea in Her Ear
- Prisoner of Second Avenue
- Red Hot Lover of Bombay
- A Thousand Clowns
- All the King's Men
- Mass Appeal
- Whose Life Is It Anyway?
- Mary Mary
- Saint Joan
- Caught on the Hop
- Are You Lonesome Tonight?
- Lend Me a Tenor
- Biloxi Blues
- Tribute
- Charley's Aunt
- Tribute to Busybee
- Power Play
- Anything Goes
- Tempt Me Not (based on Vasant Sabnis' Vichcha Majhi Puri Kara, विच्छा माझी पुरी करा)
- It Runs in the Family
- Can't Pay Won't Pay
- The Verdict
- Don't Dress for Dinner
- Begum Sumroo
- The French Cuckoo (based on An Absolute Turkey, an English version of George Feydeau's Le Dindon)(actor, producer, director)
- Barefoot in Mumbai (actor and director)
- Funny Thing Called Love (based on Vasant Kanetkar's Prema, Tujha Rang Kasa?, प्रेमा, तुझा रंग कसा?)
- Once I Was Young . . . Now I'm Wonderful
- The Graduate
- The Rummy Game
- The Sunshine Boys

=== Producer ===
Hosi Vasunia was the producer or co-producer of the following plays.

- Don't Drink the Water
- Deathtrap
- A Flea in Her Ear
- Prisoner of Second Avenue
- Red Hot Lover of Bombay
- All the King's Men
- Mass Appeal
- Whose Life Is It Anyway?
- Mary Mary
- Saint Joan
- Caught on the Hop
- Agnes of God
- Cats
- Are You Lonesome Tonight?
- Lend Me a Tenor
- As You Love It (scenes from Shakespeare)
- Tribute
- Last Tango in Heaven
- Charley's Aunt
- Love Letters
- Power Play
- Anything Goes
- Run For Your Wife
- The Happy Prince
- Death and the Maiden
- It Runs in the Family
- Can't Pay Won't Pay
- The Verdict
- The Sound of Music
- Steel Magnolias
- My Fair Lady
- Don't Dress for Dinner
- Blithe Spirit
- The French Cuckoo
- Art
- Trip the Light Fantastic!
- The Rummy Game
- The Sunshine Boys

=== Director ===
- A Thousand Clowns
- Caught on the Hop
- Are You Lonesome Tonight?
- The French Cuckoo
- Barefoot in Mumbai

== Filmography ==
- Hero Hiralal (1988)
- Gawaahi (1989)
- Percy (1989)

== Television ==
- Zabaan Sambhalke
