= Dorothy Emmerson =

American actress and singer

Dorothy Emmerson is a retired American actress and singer who was active in the New York City theatre scene during the 1960s and 1970s. She first appeared in the ensembles of the original 1963 Vernon Duke musical Zenda and the 1965 Lincoln Center Revival of Rodgers and Hammerstein's Carousel. She next starred for a couple years in the long running Off-Broadway production The Mad Show at the New Theater.

In 1968, she portrayed her first featured role on Broadway, Eileen Higby in the original production of Paul Nassau and Oscar Brand's The Education of H*Y*M*A*N K*A*P*L*A*N. This was followed by her portrayal of Rita in the original production of John Sebastian's Jimmy Shine in 1968–1969, where she shared the stage with Dustin Hoffman and Rue McClanahan.

In 1970 Emmerson portrayed the role of Mary in the original production of Ron Clark and Sam Bobrick's Norman, Is That You? at the Lyceum Theatre, sharing the stage with Maureen Stapleton. She returned to Broadway for the last time as Arlene Miller in the 1979 play Murder at the Howard Johnson's, standing in for Joyce Van Patten.

After the 1970s, Emmerson has spent her career mostly teaching acting and singing. She is currently on the faculty of the Michael Chekhov Association (MICHA). A soprano, she also occasionally appears in concert and recital, often performing Russian Art Songs. She is the daughter of diplomat John K. Emmerson.
