= Norman... Is That You? =

1976 film by George Schlatter

- Film poster by John Solie
- Directed by: George Schlatter
- Screenplay by: Ron Clark; Sam Bobrick; George Schlatter
- Based on: Norman, Is That You? 1970 play by Ron Clark; Sam Bobrick
- Produced by: George Schlatter
- Starring: Redd Foxx; Pearl Bailey; Dennis Dugan; Michael Warren
- Cinematography: Gayne Rescher
- Edited by: George Folsey, Jr.
- Production company: Metro-Goldwyn-Mayer
- Distributed by: United Artists (United States/Canada); Cinema International Corporation (International)
- Release date: September 29, 1976
- Running time: 91 minutes
- Country: United States
- Language: English

Norman... Is That You? is a 1976 American comedy film directed by George Schlatter and starring Redd Foxx and Pearl Bailey. It is based on the play Norman, Is That You? The film version changes the locale from New York City to Los Angeles and substitutes the Jewish family from the original play with an African American one.

== Overview ==
Ben Chambers' wife Beatrice runs away to Mexico with Ben's brother Albert. Ben arrives at the home of his son Norman in Los Angeles, seeking consolation. Instead, he discovers Norman is gay and living with Garson Hobart. While dealing with the abandonment of his wife, Ben tries to understand his son's orientation. After an altercation with Norman, due to Ben's hiring a prostitute for his son, Ben forms a bond with Garson.

== Cast ==
- Redd Foxx as Ben Chambers
- Pearl Bailey as Beatrice Chambers
- Dennis Dugan as Garson Hobart
- Michael Warren as Norman Chambers
- Tamara Dobson as Audrey
- Vernee Watson-Johnson as Melody (credited as Vernée Watson)
- Jayne Meadows as Adele Hobart
- George Furth as Mr. Sukara, Bookstore Clerk
- Barbara Sharma as Lady Bookstore Clerk
- Sergio Aragonés as Desk Clerk
- Sosimo Hernandez as Desk Clerk
- Wayland Flowers as Larry Davenport
- Allan Drake as Cab Driver

== Reception ==
The film was released primarily to negative reviews. Roger Ebert of the Chicago Sun-Times gave the film 2 stars out of 4 and wrote "The movie isn't much (and it's based on a Broadway play that was even less), but while Foxx is onscreen we're willing to forgive it a lot. He stands there in a clutter of cliches, bad jokes and totally baffling character motivation, and he makes us laugh." Richard Eder of The New York Times stated "It is a series of bad jokes about homosexuality, strung upon trite situation comedy and collapsing into what is meant to be an uplifting message about people being allowed to do their own thing." Gene Siskel of the Chicago Tribune gave the film 1.5 stars out of 4 and called it "a hopelessly dated comedy" with "predictable" jokes and a "dreadfully slow pace." Arthur D. Murphy of Variety called it "an uneven, sporadically amusing forced comedy effort." Charles Champlin of the Los Angeles Times wrote that the film "began life as a play, but it now looks like television, feels like television, was cast from television (Redd Foxx), lit and shot like television (on tape, mostly, rather than film) and needs only a laugh track to come off like a slightly gamier television sitcom." Gary Arnold of The Washington Post panned it as "a feeble attempt at bedroom farce." Mike Petryni of The Arizona Republic said it was "intended as a wild, wacky parlor comedy about closets. Unfortunately it's not very wild nor wacky nor funny nor interesting. It's an innocuous little ditty which happens to have Redd Foxx and Pearl Bailey in it and, consequently, a little charm, but not much else." Martin Malina of The Montreal Star wrote that the original play "lasted only two weeks on Broadway in 1970, but it later caught on with rural stock companies and community theatres. It's possible the movie version will have a similar career." Don Morrison of The Minneapolis Star called the film "a squirmy little number", and noted that its source material was "one of those shows that takes a tee-hee sexual subject (in this case homosexuality) and pretends to treat it in a sophisticated manner while carefully making sure that every cliche and Archie Bunker-type prejudice and vintage joke on the subject get run past two or three times to collect as many predictable vintage laughs on the cheap." Will Jones of The Minneapolis Tribune said that it "sounds very much like an elongated 'Sanford' episode, with the main theme of the insult humor switched from racial to sexual." Susan Stark of the Detroit Free Press noted that under Schlatter's "guidance, the material gets precisely the kind of sleazy production it deserves, even to shooting the thing on videotape and then transferring it to film, a process that makes one feel as if one were watching the movie on a television set badly in need of repair. The image is grainy, the light flickers, the figures have multiple 'ghosts'." Les Wedman of The Vancouver Sun called the film "a slick, momentarily entertaining and downright dumb comedy" that "isn't without its hilarious moments, but they are principally due to the work of Redd Foxx as the father whose problems are worse than anyone else's." Tim A. Janes of The Arizona Daily Star called the film "a tedious, unfunny, offensive comedy" that "manages to pull out every stereotype in the book as it portrays homosexuals as mincing, swishy, bitchy, hyperactive butterflies in heat." He added:

The initial incident for the humor in this film is the traumatic event of parent and son confronting each other over the son's sexual orientation. In a society that continually reinforces hatred of homosexuals, that's about as funny as a dead puppy.

The film professes toleration while getting its biggest laughs from the meanest kind of ridicule. While offhandedly saying that gay people can be found anywhere the film only shows them as window-dressers, effeminate night-club entertainers and parasitic momma's boys.

Leaving aside the social questions inherent in the film, the script is just plain bad. It is a succession of one-liners, set up in porcelain-slick 'Wish Broadway fashion with no regard for any other pacing than the most elemental one of keeping feeble jokes coming fast and furious.

The film has the over-all look of a stock television situation comedy.

By far the best things in the movie are Redd Foxx, who turns in a dynamite performance as the bewildered father and the Smokey Robinson song, "An Old Fashioned Man." Pearl Bailey's talents are wasted in a part that is little more than a cord to tie up the plot's meandering loose ends.

Michael Warren as the son is inoffensive and Dennis Dugan as the son's lover is a cartoon.

Jerry Oster's review of the film in the New York Daily News read as follows:

The makers of "Norman . . . Is That You?" are television veterans, and they must have been tempted to add a laugh track to this comedy about a father who discovers that his son is a homosexual.

Canned laughter, in fact, is the only laughter that could be stimulated by this insultingly dumb adaptation of a Broadway play, which might have once raised some eyebrows with its subject matter but now. only lowers eyelids.

The script (by George Schlatter, Ron Clark and Sam Bobrick) has the zest and bounce of nearly-set cement. Schlatter, who also directed, preserved the cumbersome staging of the play as if its entrances and exits were divinely inspired.

The performances, by Redd Foxx as the father and Michael Warren as the son, are those of actors in search of cue cards. Pearl Bailey, as Foxx's wife, provides the only stimulation not by her acting (which is bad), but by the way she pronounces Tucson, as if it were in France, not Arizona.

William Gallo of the Rocky Mountain News wrote that "were it not for a spate of middleweight expletives this flyweight situation comedy might have found its way onto television, where it belongs. As it is, it marks the movie debut of comedian Redd Foxx, who's certainly paid his dues over the years, but who is no film actor if we are to judge by this. 'Norman, Is That You?' ran exactly 10 nights on Broadway, and it is not difficult to see why. It is an urban comedy all about what middle America has been told is the 'Sexual Revolution'—that untouchable, slightly naughty bit of mythology always sure to provoke such flimsy and fatuous stuff as this." he added:

Amid the familiarity, Foxx gets off a well-timed line or two, particularly in a sequence where he’s nervously buying an armful of books on homosexuality. But the film is cramped where it should be roomy, the script is pedestrian, the acting highly theatrical, as if we were sitting in the balcony straining to see all these popping eyes and to hear these broad exclamations.

Beyond the bland artlessness of the film, I also suspect it may put gay liberationists into an unholy lather. The stereotyping here is not so much cruel as thoughtless, the film’s main jokes bursting with the kind of unconscious, well-intentioned insult that was once reserved for matters of race.

Race itself is never touched upon here. The film takes pains to be totally colorless, to be a middle class comedy rather than any other kind. Personally I'm willing to give the middle class of any color more credit for a sense of humor than this.

A mixed review was contributed by Joe Pollock of the St. Louis Post-Dispatch, who wrote that the play "doesn't work so well on film. There is the necessity for the introduction of more characters and external locations to fill time, and it isn't always in the proper style, as in the wasted comedy routine of a couple of Mexican hotel clerks. In addition, the ending is an obvious cop-out on the part of the authors. It is not a solution, merely a postponement, and the story ends without resolution. Still, it's a chance to see a couple of real pros in action as Foxx and Miss Bailey go through their paces, and the closing musical number, sung by Thelma Houston, is a real winner."

Conversely, Brian Perry of The Toronto Star called it "perhaps the most enjoyable comedy movie to come out of Hollywood in months", adding that "it handles a touchy subject with a surprising amount of good taste and seldom falls into the trap of using the topic as a source of cheap or easy laughs." Stanley Eichelbaum of the San Francisco Examiner called it "a juicy vehicle for Redd Foxx, who wraps himself around the role of the dumfounded and dunderheaded parent, mustering all the familiar shtick he picked up in his years as a nightclub comic and transposed so successfully to the amiable grouch he portrays in the TV series, 'Sanford and Son'." Joe Baltake of the Philadelphia Daily News said "I had an absolute ball with 'Norman ... Is That You?' and plan to see it again until it becomes an old friend." R.H. Gardner of The Baltimore Sun said that "the humor is not far above the level of 'Abie's Irish Rose,' another funny play which had a somewhat longer run when it opened several decades ago, but it is no less effective for thai Indeed, as adapted by director George Schlatter, Ron Clark and Sam Bobrick from the Messrs. Clark's and Bobrick's original playscript and performed by Redd Foxx . at the head of a talented cast, it adds up to about a laugh a line. A pretty fair average. Lou Cedrone of The Evening Sun reviewed it simultaneously with The Great Scout & Cathouse Thursday, remarking that "they are not great films, but because we have had so much tragedy, so much gore and so much desperation, they look rather good, better, I am sure, than they have a right to look." George McKinnon of The Boston Globe said that Foxx "grabs hold of the big screen and never lets go, practically wiping out all the subsidiary performers. And that includes the redoubtable Pearl Bailey who, although co-starred, has only what amounts to a late walk-on, which she fluffs, badly. Miscast is perhaps the kindest word for Pearlie Mae's performance." He added that "the movie doesn't proselytize nor does it put down, but simply accepts the fact of homosexuality and then plays it for a high-spirited romp."

On the review aggregator website Rotten Tomatoes, 40% of 5 critics' reviews are positive.
