= Ekin Tunçay Turan =

Turkish actress

- Born: Ekin Tunçay; Ankara, Turkey
- Occupations: Actress, translator
- Spouse: Mesut Turan (1995–present)

Ekin Tunçay Turan (born Ekin Tunçay), is a Turkish actress and translator. She has been working in Turkish State Theatre since 1993.

== Biography ==
Turan attended high school in Ankara, where she began to act. While still a student, she appeared on Turkish Radio Television in various TV series. She graduated in 1992 from the Ankara Conservatory Theatre Department of Hacettepe University. In 1993, she joined Trabzon State Theatre. Seven years later, she was engaged by the Ankara State Theatre. She appeared in the television series "Blood Wedding" and "The Fake Princess" in 2005–2006.

Turan started translating plays and TV films from English to Turkish in the year 2005. She is also currently working with TRT, translating various films and documentaries.

In 2007, she took a course on camera acting from New York Film Academy in Los Angeles. The following year, Turkish State Theatre in Ankara released her for six months to appear with the Open Fist Theatre in Los Angeles and to study and conduct research. During this period, she took part in various projects and events of the Open Fist Theatre. Some of the workshops she attended include "Mask Making", "Suzuki and Viewpoints" organised by New York-based SITI Company and Eric Morris's acting course. She also took private lessons in Joanne Baron / D.W. Brown Acting Studio and in Susan Batson's Black Nexxus and received on-camera training from Batson's son Carl Ford.

She is currently working as an actress in Ankara State Theatres.

== Stage performances ==
- The Woman in Black: Susan Hill / Stephen Mallatratt – Ankara State Theatre
- The Winter’s Tale: William Shakespeare – Ankara State Theatre
- Jake's Women: Neil Simon – Ankara State Theatre
- Dog Woman Man: Sibylle Berg – Ankara State Theatre
- Love Is Far From Here: Özen Yula – Ankara State Theatre
- Komşu Köyün Delisi: Üstün Dökmen – Ankara State Theatre
- Bir Varmış İki de Varmış: Ali Meriç – Ankara State Theatre
- Ah, Wilderness: Eugene O'Neill – Ankara State Theatre
- King Richard III: William Shakespeare – Ankara State Theatre
- The Prisoner of Second Avenue: Neil Simon – Trabzon State Theatre
- Fermanlı Deli Hazretleri: Müsahipzade Celâl – Trabzon State Theatre
- Çok Yaşa Sağlık: Volker Ludwig & Christian Veit – Trabzon State Theatre
- The Crafty Wife Of The Silly Husband: Haldun Taner – Trabzon State Theatre
- Hurmuz With Seven Husbands: Sadık Şendil – Trabzon State Theatre
- Tartuffe: Molière – Trabzon State Theatre
- Yaşasın Gökkuşağı: Ülkü Ayvaz – Trabzon State Theatre
- The Condolence: Murathan Mungan – Trabzon State Theatre
- Legend Of Kesanlı Ali: Haldun Taner – Trabzon State Theatre
- Master Of Istanbul: Müsahipzade Celâl – Trabzon State Theatre
- The Merchant Of Venice: William Shakespeare – Trabzon State Theatre
- How Would Asiye Be Saved ?: Vasıf Öngören – Trabzon State Theatre

== Translated plays ==
- Mosquitoes: Sivrisinekler: Lucy Kirkwood – 2021
- Holmes and Watson: Holmes Ve Watson: Jeffrey Hatcher – 2020
- The Girl on the Train: Trendeki Kız: Paula Hawkins / Rachel Wagstaff & Duncan Abel – 2019
- Mom, Dad and a Bad Idea: Anne, Baba Ve Kötü Bir Fikir: Sam Bobrick & Joey Bobrick – 2019
- Quietly: Sessizce: Owen McCafferty – 2019
- The Children: Çocuklar: Lucy Kirkwood – 2018
- It's Only Murder: Sırf Cinayet: Sam Bobrick – 2018
- Murder at the Howard Johnson's: Otelde Cinayet: Sam Bobrick & Ron Clark – 2018
- Goodbye Letters: Veda Mektupları: Sam Bobrick – 2018
- Things I Know to Be True: Doğru Bildiğim Şeyler: Andrew Bovell – 2018
- Waiting for Waiting for Godot: Godot'yu Beklerken'i Beklerken: Dave Hanson – 2017
- Johnny Got His Gun: Johnny Askere Gitti: Dalton Trumbo / Bradley Rand Smith – 2016
- Welcome To My Head: Aklıma Hoş Geldiniz: Sam Bobrick – 2016
- The Humans: İnsanlar: Stephen Karam – 2016
- Hangmen: Cellâtlar: Martin McDonagh – 2016
- The Flick: Sinema: Annie Baker – 2016
- The Other Place: Öteki Yer: Sharr White – 2014
- Lunch with Mrs. Baskin: Bayan Baskin'le Öğle Yemeği: Sam Bobrick – 2014
- Bang! You're Dead!: Bam! Sen Öldün!: Lori Donner – 2014
- Curiosity Cat: Meraklı Kedi: Chris Grabenstein – 2014
- Scenes from a Separation: Bir Ayrılıktan Sahneler: Andrew Bovell & Hannie Rayson – 2013
- Last Lists of My Mad Mother: Annemin Son Çılgınlıkları: Julie Jensen – 2012
- Collaborators: İşbirlikçiler: John Hodge – 2012
- Kafka's Monkey: Kafka'nın Maymunu: Franz Kafka / Colin Teevan – 2012
- A Behanding in Spokane: Kayıp El "Spokane'de El(e)veda": Martin McDonagh – 2012
- Alice in Wonderland: Alice Harikalar Diyarında: Lewis Carroll / Tim Kane – 2012
- Freud's Last Session: Freud'un Son Seansı: Mark St. Germain – 2011
- Shrek the Musical: Shrek Müzikali: David Lindsay-Abaire – 2011
- Faith, Hope and Charity: İnanç, Umut Ve İyilik: Ödön von Horváth – 2011
- Judgment Day: Hesap Günü: Ödön von Horváth – 2011
- Speaking in Tongues: Anlaşılmaz Konuşmalar: Andrew Bovell – 2011
- Reader: Sansürcü: Ariel Dorfman – 2010
- Two Single People: İki Bekâr: Sam Bobrick – 2010
- Travis Pine (A Man of the People): Halktan Biri (Travis Pine): Sam Bobrick – 2010
- Leading Ladies: Başroldeki Kadınlar: Ken Ludwig – 2010
- How to Explain the History of Communism to Mental Patients: Akıl Hastalarına Komünizmin Tarihi Nasıl Anlatılır ?: Matei Vișniec – 2010
- A Second of Pleasure: Bir Mutluluk Ânı: Neil LaBute – 2010
- Land of the Dead: Ölüler Diyarı: Neil LaBute – 2010
- Fuddy Meers (Funny Mirrors): Konik Annalar (Komik Aynalar): David Lindsay-Abaire – 2010
- In the Rest Room at Rosenblooms: Rosenblooms'da Bir Gün: Ludmilla Bollow – 2009
- Helter Skelter: Karmakarışık: Neil LaBute – 2009
- 33 Variations: 33 Varyasyon: Moisés Kaufman – 2009
- Half and Half: Yarı Yarıya: James Sherman – 2009
- Cookin' with Gus: Gus İle Yemek Saati: Jim Brochu – 2009
- Tuesdays with Morrie: Morrie İle Her Salı: Jeffrey Hatcher & Mitch Albom – 2009
- Books : Kitaplar: Stuart M. Kaminsky – 2009
- Passengers: Yolcular: Sam Bobrick – 2009
- Baggage: Bavul: Sam Bobrick – 2009
- Still Life: Yine de Yaşamak: Alexander Dinelaris – 2008
- The Chaos Theories: Kaos Teorileri: Alexander Dinelaris – 2008
- Annoyance: Baş Belâsı: Sam Bobrick – 2007
- Kiss Me Like You Mean It: Beni Gerçekten Öp: Chris Chibnall – 2005

== TV series ==
- Sahte Prenses: Show TV – 2006 (The Fake Princess) Photos
- Kanlı Düğün: Show TV – 2005 (Blood Wedding) Photos
