= M. V. Kamath =

Indian journalist, well-known in print and broadcasting media

- Born: 7 September 1921; Udupi, Madras Presidency, British India
- Died: 9 October 2014 (aged 93); Manipal, Karnataka, India
- Occupations: Journalist, broadcasting executive, academic administrator
- Years active: 1940-2014
- Awards: Padma Bhushan

Madhav Vittal Kamath (7 September 1921 – 9 October 2014) was an Indian journalist and broadcasting executive, and the chairman of Prasar Bharati. He worked as the editor of The Sunday Times for two years from 1967 to 1969, as Washington correspondent for The Times of India from 1969 to 1978 and also as editor of The Illustrated Weekly of India. He had also written numerous books and was conferred with the Padma Bhushan award in 2004. He was born in a brahmin family

In 2009, Mr. Kamath co-authored a biographical sketch of Narendra Modi book titled Narendra Modi: The Architect of a Modern State, at a time when Modi's reputation was considerably affected as a result of the 2002 Gujarat riots; post his ascent into national politics, a newer version of the book was published as The Man of the Moment: Narendra Modi. Kamath was a board-member of Manipal Academy of Higher Education and was also the Honorary Director of the School of Communication, since its inception in 1997.

He died on the morning of October 9, 2014, from a cardiac arrest at Kasturba Hospital; he was hospitalized since a few days back due to geriatric ailments.

Malini Parthasarathy notes him to have longstanding sympathies with Hindutva—one of his columns following the murder of Graham Staines by Hindutva extremists sought to justify the incident as a spontaneous repercussion against conversions, if the government were not willing to step in—in what she deems that as a blatant incitement of hate crimes. Others have shared similar views and he has also extensively written in the official mouthpiece of RSS - Organiser. Kamath has been noted to be an astute journalist, whose opinions swayed with the tune of the majority; his stance on the Babri Masjid demolition was quite negative in the immediate aftermath but after about a decade, he deemed that as an act of valiance that restored the self-respect of Hindus and rejoiced about how the state, of Hindu India being under continual siege since the first Islamic invasions, was reversed for the first time. In the immediate aftermaths of the enactment of Mandal Commission recommendations, when RSS increasingly leaned towards a hardcore Brahmanical approach, Kamath had written of the need to maintain Hindu unity and negate the fall-outs of an impending Shudra revolution. Alexander Evans had noted his efforts in racist communalisation of the Kashmir conflict; Kamath deemed the region to belong solely to the Pandits and not to the Muslims, who were allegedly alone-responsible for the decline of their culture. Rajmohan Gandhi notes him to be a staunch Hindu.

== Bibliography ==
- On Media, Politics and Literature (2009), Prabal Publishing, Bangalore.
- Narendra Modi – The Architect of a Modern State (2009) Co-author Kalindi Randeri, Rupa & Co., New Delhi.
- Gandhi – A Spiritual Journey (2007), Indus Source Books, Mumbai.
- Reporter at Large (2002), Bharatiya Vidya Bhavan, Mumbai.
- The Pursuit of Excellence (1982), Rupa & Co., New Delhi.
- The United States and India, 1776-1996: The Bridge over the River Time (1998), ICCR, New Delhi
- Corruption & the Lokpal Bill (2012) : Written & Edited with Gayatri Pagdi, Indus Source Books, Mumbai
