= Loreto College, Kolkata =

Catholic women's college in Kolkata, India

Loreto College
- Coat of arms of Loreto College, Kolkata
- Type: Public
- Established: 1912; 114 years ago
- Academic affiliations: Calcutta University
- Principal: Sister Christine Coutinho
- Undergraduates: Bachelor of Arts, Bachelor of Science, Bachelor of Education
- Postgraduates: Master of Arts
- Location: Sir William Jones Sarani, Kolkata, West Bengal, India; 22.550169°N 88.3517168°E
- Website: www.loretocollege.in
- Location within West Bengal Location within India

Loreto College is a Catholic women's college in Kolkata, India. Affiliated with the University of Calcutta, the college focuses on liberal arts and sciences. It was established in 1912 by the Religious Order of the Institute of the Blessed Virgin Mary. As of January 2012, the college is 'A' rated by the National Assessment and Accreditation Council (NAAC).

== Academics at Loreto College ==
Loreto College offers B.A.(Honors), B.A. (General), B.Sc (General) and B.Sc (Honors) courses. The courses offered by the college in respective areas are as follows:

1) B.A. (Honors): a) English b) Education c) History d) Political Science e) Psychology

2) B.A. (General): The college offers the degree with any three electives one of the following combinations: a) History/ Political Science/ Education b) History/ Education/ English / Hindi / Bengali c) Geography/ Political Science English / Hindi / Bengali d) Economics/ History/ Education / Political Science

3) B.Sc (General): A student pursuing the degree from Loreto College requires doing so with the three electives given below: a) Geography b) Economics c) Political Science

4) B.Sc (Honors): a) Geography b) Psychology c) Economics

The college also offers a B.Ed course and M.A. in English.

== Notable alumni ==
- Bharati Mukherjee, American author
- Moon Moon Sen, Bollywood actress
- Ruchira Gupta, social activist
- Shaista Suhrawardy Ikramullah, Pakistani politician, diplomat and author
- Zaib-un-Nissa Hamidullah, Pakistani journalist, editor, and feminist
- Anashua Majumdar, Bengali actress
- Jaya Bachchan, Indian actress and Politician
- Anamika Khanna, Indian fashion designer
- Asma Khan, British chef
- Bachi karkaria, Indian journalist and Columnist
- Kamalinee Mukherjee, Indian actress
- Indu Puri, Sportsperson
- Leila Seth, Indian judge
- Pinky Lilani, Author and Women's advocate
- Rajashree Birla, Indian philanthropist
- Rukmini Maitra, Indian model and Actress
- Sudeshna Roy, Indian film director
- Ruchira Gupta, Indian journalist and Activist
- Debolina Dutta, Indian actress

== Controversy ==
The college authority published an admission notice on 3 July 2023 stating that students whose medium of instruction in Class XII was the vernacular have not been considered for admission in the college. This notice is considered derogatory to the Bengali medium applicants and on protest the college authority pulled down it. Calcutta University made it clear that such type of notices should not be issued in future. The college thereafter took the initiative to bridge the gap for the students coming from vernacular-medium schools by introducing them to a crash course in English.

== See also ==
- List of colleges affiliated to the University of Calcutta
- Education in India
- Education in West Bengal
