= Life Stinks =

1991 film by Mel Brooks

- Theatrical release poster
- Directed by: Mel Brooks
- Screenplay by: Mel Brooks; Rudy De Luca; Steve Haberman
- Story by: Mel Brooks; Ron Clark; Rudy De Luca; Steve Haberman
- Produced by: Mel Brooks
- Starring: Mel Brooks; Lesley Ann Warren; Jeffrey Tambor; Stuart Pankin; Howard Morris
- Cinematography: Steven Poster
- Edited by: Michael Mulconery; David Rawlins; Anthony Redman
- Music by: John Morris
- Production company: Brooksfilms
- Distributed by: Metro-Goldwyn-Mayer (United States); 20th Century Fox (International)
- Release date: July 26, 1991
- Running time: 92 minutes
- Country: United States
- Language: English
- Budget: $13 million
- Box office: $4.1 million

Life Stinks is a 1991 American comedy film co-written, produced, directed by and starring Mel Brooks. It is one of the few Mel Brooks comedies that is not a parody, nor at any time does the film break the fourth wall (apart from a dance sequence midway through the film). It co-stars Lesley Ann Warren, Howard Morris and Jeffrey Tambor. The original music score was composed by John Morris. The film was both a critical and a box-office flop, but has since taken a cult following among fans.

== Plot ==
Goddard Bolt is the callous CEO of Bolt Enterprises. Bolt shows little regard for other people's needs or for the environment. He has his eye on the slum of Los Angeles, with the intent of tearing it down. Bolt makes a bet with his biggest rival, Vance Crasswell, who also has an interest in the property. Crasswell challenges Bolt to survive on the streets as if he were homeless for 30 days. Should Bolt lose, Crasswell owns the property, but should Bolt win, Crasswell will sell it for practically nothing.

There are three conditions: Bolt will be completely penniless; he must wear an electronic anklet that will activate if he leaves the boundaries, forfeiting the bet if he exceeds 30 seconds out of bounds; and at no time can he reveal to any of the slum area residents that he is Goddard Bolt. To add to the look, Bolt has his mustache shaved off, then Crasswell confiscates his toupée. Bolt is taken to the slums, thrown out of the limo and begins the bet. Unbeknown to Bolt, Crasswell schemes to make Goddard's stay on the streets as bad as possible. Bolt, homeless, hungry and filthy, is befriended by skid-row inhabitants Sailor and Fumes, and given the nickname "Pepto" after falling asleep in a crate with a Pepto-Bismol logo on its side.

During the bet, he meets and eventually becomes attracted to Molly, a homeless woman who used to be a dancer on Broadway. During a scuffle with two muggers, Bolt is pushed out of bounds, which activates his anklet. To prevent the "30-second forfeiture", Bolt rushes back in, which impresses Molly with his supposed bravery, as it looks like he is tackling the muggers.

Bolt learns a series of important life lessons during his "adventure", namely that life is not about accomplishments or material success, but rather the integrity of the human spirit. However, Bolt is unaware that the unscrupulous Crasswell has no intention of honoring their bet. When Crasswell realizes that Bolt is honoring the bet fair and square, Crasswell bribes Bolt's lawyers into fabricating the story that Bolt had lost his mind and has his property seized. Bolt finds this out first hand as, upon completing the bet, he forces his way into a party which is being held by Crasswell at Bolt's home and his lawyers feign ignorance.

Forced to live on the streets for good and remanded to a free clinic by mistake, a drugged Bolt murmurs that "life stinks". Molly implores him to remember the small things, such as the two of them waltzing, that make life livable. Crasswell, meanwhile, has his own plans for the slum area, planning to tear it down as well. Bolt incites Fumes and the other slum residents to stage a mock battle during the televised ceremony of Crasswell demolishing the slum area. Realising that he will be ousted, Crasswell attempts to stop Bolt with a hydraulic excavator. When Bolt's grapple has plucked Crasswell and has him hanging by his jacket, the scene is freeze-framed into a news report saying that Crasswell, in a court case, was forced to admit he made a bet with Bolt, then reneged on the terms.

Bolt, now in control of the area, has plans to renovate it into the "Bolt Center", which will give the slum residents employment, renovate the tenements into livable homes, and give the children a private school financed entirely out of pocket by Goddard Bolt. The news report ends by saying that Bolt has married Molly, and the press are expecting an extravagant event, only to then be shown Goddard and Molly taking their wedding vows in a simple chapel in the slum area, then driving off in a limousine with a vanity plate "PEPTO".

== Cast ==
- Mel Brooks as Goddard Bolt
- Lesley Ann Warren as Molly
- Jeffrey Tambor as Vance Crasswell
- Stuart Pankin as Pritchard
- Howard Morris as Sailor
- Rudy De Luca as J. Paul Getty
- Theodore Wilson as Fumes
- Carmen Filpi as Pops (eleven's up)
- Michael Ensign as Knowles
- Matthew Faison as Stevens
- Billy Barty as Willy
- Brian Thompson as Mean Victor
- Raymond O'Connor as Yo
- Carmine Caridi as Flophouse Owner
- Sammy Shore as Reverend at Wedding
- Frank Roman as Spanish Interpreter
- Christopher Birt as Paramedic
- Larry Cedar as Paramedic
- Robert Ridgely as Crasswell's Attorney
- Ronny Graham as the voice of the Priest

== Production ==
Whoopi Goldberg was initially considered for Lesley Ann Warren's role; however, Brooks was uncertain whether he could convincingly play her love interest. Sailor's funeral was inspired by an incident that happened when Howard Morris was scattering his father's ashes.

== Release ==
The film was screened out of competition at the 1991 Cannes Film Festival, prior to its theatrical release on July 26, 1991.

=== Home media ===
The 2015 Blu-Ray release includes a Brooks audio commentary and a short documentary feature about the making of the film.

== Reception ==
=== Critical response ===
On the review aggregator website Rotten Tomatoes, 25% of 20 critics' reviews are positive, with an average rating of 4.3/10. Metacritic, which uses a weighted average, assigned the film a score of 54 out of 100, based on 19 critics, indicating "mixed or average" reviews.

Roger Ebert called Life Stinks "a warmhearted new comedy", opining that while Brooks did an exemplary job of finding humor in the dismal subject matter, the film is much less comedy-focused than most of his films, taking a sensitive and poignant approach to its characters. He also highly praised Brooks's acting in the film, and concluded, "There is a certain tension in Life Stinks between the bull-headed optimism of the Brooks character, and the hopeless reality of the streets, and that’s what the movie is about." Marjorie Baumgarten of The Austin Chronicle, in contrast, was unimpressed with the film's message, arguing that it is implausible that a man like Goddard Bolt would not succeed at life on the streets, and that the only places where the film succeeds are in its humorous moments rather than its attempts to convey a message. Summing up "The problem with Life Stinks is that it's got its heart in the right place but not a whole lot else," she gave it two out of five stars. She added that it was a mistake for Brooks to attempt a more serious film, an opinion shared by Janet Maslin, who remarked that Brooks "has a much surer sense of how to lampoon such a figure [as Goddard Bolt] than of how to turn him into anyone nice." She regarded the subject matter as too depressing for most of the humor to work, and also criticized the uncharacteristically polite nature of Brooks's jokes in the film. However, she praised the performances of Lesley Ann Warren and Teddy Wilson.

In a review of the 2015 Blu-Ray release, Matt Brunson of Creative Loafing Charlotte commented, "Mel Brooks strikes out with this sizable flop that's perhaps surpassed only by 1995's Dracula: Dead and Loving It as the auteur's worst." Citing the failed efforts at social satire and absence of Mel Brooks's usual collection of leads, he gave it one-and-a-half stars.

Despite the film's failure, Brooks later cited Life Stinks, along with The Producers and The Twelve Chairs, as one of the films he's most proud of. In his 2021 memoir All About Me!: My Remarkable Life in Show Business, Brooks also wrote that he considered the movie his best work as an actor.

=== Box office ===
Life Stinks grossed $4.1 million in the United States and Canada, against a budget of $13 million.
