= Bachi Karkaria =

Indian journalist

Bachi Karkaria is an Indian journalist and columnist. She has served as an editor at The Times of India and has also helped create new brands for the Bennett Coleman & Co Ltd media group. She is best known for her satirical column called Erratica in the newspaper and as the author of the best selling title Dare To Dream: A Life of M.S. Oberoi.

She also writes a relationships advice column called Giving Gyan for Mumbai Mirror, a city tabloid for the Times of India group. She is a regular panellist on television news programs.

Karkaria was the first Indian on the board of the World Editors Forum, is a recipient of the US-based Mary Morgan-Hewitt Award for Lifetime Achievement, and a Jefferson Fellow of the East West Centre, Honolulu. She is on the advisory boards of the National AIDS Control Organisation and the India AIDS Initiative of the Bill & Melinda Gates Foundation.

== Education, early career and personal life ==
Born into a Parsi family, Karkaria graduated in 1965 with honours in English Literature from Loreto College, Calcutta, and then received a diploma in journalism from the University of Calcutta and was awarded a gold medal. She then joined her family newspaper. Later, she moved to the Illustrated Weekly under Khushwant Singh and subsequently joined the Times of India. In 1975, the Times Group sent her to undertake a course in advanced journalism at the Thomson Foundation, Cardiff, Wales.

== Career as a journalist ==
=== Urban issues ===
In the 1980s, when city issues were still considered a lower form of journalism, Karkaria wrote stories for The Statesman, Calcutta, on urban agenda. Returning to Mumbai, she edited the Saturday edition of The Metropolis, launched the Bombay Times and was instrumental in the dramatic turnaround of the Bangalore edition of the Times of India. Having stagnated at No.4 for 10 years up to 1996, by mid-1997, the edition had shot up to No.1, and has steadily increased its lead since then. The Bangalore model became the template for all the other editions of the Times of India, including the premier Mumbai and Delhi editions.

In 2000, the Mumbai tabloid Mid-Day created the post of Editorial Director for her, a recognition of her reputation. This new position provided Karkaria with valuable experience in Internet and radio journalism, to add to her expertise in print. Returning to the Times of India, as resident editor, Delhi, she weaned the paper away from its political dependence. As a result of her recognition, she was eventually appointed as National Metro Editor of the Times of India in 2004.

=== HIV/AIDS and gender ===
Much of Karkaria's work is devoted to public health, specifically HIV/AIDS. Her investigative and analytical stories have set policy agendas.

Her closely researched pieces in the Times of India provide the social epidemiology of the Indian epidemic over the past 15 years: the plight of marginalised communities caught between life and livelihood, the denial of policy makers, AIDS as the new medical pariah, and the contamination in blood products. Her white-knuckle investigative series on the last-mentioned resulted in their being taken off the shelves, and the subsequent formulation of a new safety policy. The corpus of her work explained the complex nature and implications of HIV/AIDS, gave it a human face, challenged official apathy, demanded accountability and exposed dangerous hypocrisy.

Karkaria has participated in international AIDS conferences at San Francisco, Berlin, Chiang Mai, Yokohama and Barcelona, and is familiar with the major global players in halting the pandemic. Apart from being appointed to the advisory board of the India AIDS Initiative of the Bill & Melinda Gates Foundation, she served on the first legal, ethical and social committee of India's apex AIDS organisation, the NACO, and is now again on its advisory board. She has monitored the work of International AIDS Vaccine Initiative (IAVI) and the progress of India's recent vaccine trials. Both, the US-based Mary Morgan Hewitt Lifetime Achievement Award and the Media India Award, 1992, made special mention of the commitment and uniformly high standard of her AIDS reportage and analysis.

Karkaria's attention shift to gender began almost as an act of obligation. Appointed the first woman assistant editor of Calcutta's hoary newspaper in 1980, The Statesman, she felt honour-bound to start writing on issues which this patriarchal daily had written about with condescension or simply dismissed as inconsequential. In the decade that she worked here, she put gender sharply on the agenda, a fact acknowledged in media studies such as the one conducted by Kalpana Sharma and Ammu Joseph which used her work as an example of how a committed and responsible woman in a senior editorial position can bring about seminal change in editorial policy and practice.

At The Statesman, she was the first to expose the travesty of women in so-called custodial protection: rape victims, women who were falsely certified as lunatics to get them conveniently out of the way in property disputes, or even those who were just destitute. The scourge of dowry deaths, the ingrained gender prejudice of the police force which prevented the registering of cases, and actual custodial rape all became regular subjects of her editorials and special comment pieces.

Later, when urbanisation became the thrust of her own writing and the papers she edited, she made sure to include the impact of fast-changing cities on health, gender and indeed the delicate web of human relationships. She has always given equal if not more weight to what she classifies as 'Intrastructure', not just Infrastructure.

Her women-centered column, Differences, ran for several years in The Sunday Times, and then in Mid-Day.

=== Population ===
Her gender writing dovetailed into her work on population at The Statesman. She gave it a sharp profile by writing an editorial or a signed piece on the multiple and complex issues at least once a week. Among the most hard-hitting was a series on the global politics of infant formula food titled 'Making Suckers of the Third World'. She was the first to point out the flaws of a 'target-driven' approach, and can claim to have coined the now widely used term, 'foeticide', when she began strongly condemning the snowballing practice of turning amniocentesis from a medical tool into a weapon of gender genocide in the mid-1980s.

A decade later when she had moved to the Times of India, she was commissioned by the Population Council to co-author the document on the country's new Reproductive health policy. Combining her extensive and insightful understanding with her communication skills she demystified the policy, making it accessible to its governmental, quasi-official and NGO 'customers'.

As a professional, she brings to the table an ability to see the big picture, connect the dots, and drill down to the details. She can distill the essence from a vast pool of data, extract the facts from the hype. She also knows how to tell a story with both style and substance.

== Career as an author ==
Dare to Dream, a best-selling biography of the legendary hotelier MS Oberoi; Mumbai Masti, a richly illustrated book, in collaboration with designer Krsna Mehta, capturing the city's quirky soul; The Cake That Walked, on Flurys, Calcutta's iconic tea-room on the legendary Park Street, plus Erratica and Your Flip Is Showing, collections of her columns and other articles. She has written the corporate biographies of the Times of India Group and of Larsen & Toubro, India's global engineering giant. She has contributed insightful essays to books documenting India's social transformation. She has scripted a documentary on AIDS for the acclaimed film-maker, Shyam Benegal. The Rummy Game, her adaptation of D L Coburn's Pulitzer prize-winning play, The Gin Game was a critical and commercial success and traveled to Europe and the US as a fund-raiser for local charities. She also wrote In Hot Blood: The Nanavati Case that shook India that was released on May 15, 2017.

== Career as a media trainer ==
She has carried her passion for cities into her new avatar as a media trainer. It began with the World Editors Forums Master Classes for Editors in Emerging Economies in Hanoi and Cairo. This led to her being invited by Egypt's USAID-funded Media Development Project to help set up the Alexandria edition of the Al Youm group, and a couple of years later, in 2008, to conduct a refresher program for them, as well as widen the horizons and upgrade the skills of other local papers. She is now a designated media trainer for the Times Group, and lends her expertise to other media houses and J schools. She was one of the two people who developed the curriculum of the Times Media Training Centre, Mumbai, and she conducted the entire Reporting module.
