= Rudy De Luca =

American screenwriter and actor (born 1942)

- Born: September 28, 1942 (age 83)
- Occupations: Screenwriter; actor; film director
- Years active: 1967–2012

Rudy De Luca (born September 28, 1942) is an American screenwriter, actor and film director.

De Luca is perhaps best known for his work with filmmaker Mel Brooks. He co-founded The Comedy Store with Sammy Shore in April 1972.

== Filmography ==
=== As writer ===
- The Carol Burnett Show (1967) (TV)
- The Tim Conway Show (1970) (TV)
- The Marty Feldman Comedy Machine (1971) (TV)
- Silent Movie (with Mel Brooks, Barry Levinson and Ron Clark) (1976)
- High Anxiety (with Mel Brooks, Barry Levinson and Ron Clark) (1977)
- Peeping Times (1978) (TV)
- Caveman (with Carl Gottlieb) (1981)
- Transylvania 6-5000 (1985) (also Director)
- Million Dollar Mystery (with Tim Metcalfe and Miguel Tejada-Flores) (1987)
- Life Stinks (with Mel Brooks, Steve Haberman and Ron Clark) (1991)
- Dracula: Dead and Loving It (with Mel Brooks and Steve Haberman) (1995)
- The Good Bad Guy (with Ezio Greggio) (1997)
- Screw Loose (with Steve Haberman) (1999)
- Box Office 3D: The Filmest of Films (2011)
- Big Finish (with Martin Guigui) (2012)

=== As actor ===
Year	Title	Role	Notes
1971	The Return of Count Yorga	Lieutenant Madden	
1971	The Marty Feldman Comedy Machine	Various Characters	
1972	The Mary Tyler Moore Show	Nightclub Manager	Episode: "But Seriously, Folks"
1976	Silent Movie	Executive	
1977	High Anxiety	Braces	
1980	Fatso	Pat Manarino	
1981	History of the World, Part I	Primate / Caveman / Capt. Mucus	
1985	Transylvania 6-5000	Lawrence Malbot	
1987	Million Dollar Mystery	Money Counter	
1987	Spaceballs	Vinnie	
1991	Life Stinks	J. Paul Getty	
1993	Robin Hood: Men in Tights	Party Guest	
1995	Dracula: Dead and Loving It	Guard	
1997	The Good Bad Guy	Vince	
2003	National Lampoon's Gold Diggers	Uncle Walt	
2004	Curb Your Enthusiasm	Rudy	2 Episodes
2008	Spaceballs: The Animated Series	Vinnie / Fort Lox Checkpoint official (voice)	5 Episodes

=== As producer ===
- Peeping Times (1978) (TV)

=== As director ===
- Peeping Times (1978) (TV)
- Transylvania 6-5000 (1985)
