= Peeping Times =

1978 American comedy television special

- Title card
- Genre: Comedy special
- Written by: Rudy De Luca; Barry Levinson; Bill Richmond; Gene Perret; Robert Illes; James Stein; Christopher Guest
- Directed by: Rudy De Luca; Barry Levinson
- Starring: Alan Oppenheimer; David Letterman
- Composer: Joe Raposo
- Country of origin: United States
- Original language: English

Production
- Executive producers: David Frost; Marvin Minoff
- Producers: Rudy De Luca; Barry Levinson
- Running time: 50 minutes
- Production company: Paradine-DeLuca-Levinson

Original release
- Network: NBC
- Release: January 25, 1978

Peeping Times is a 1978 American comedy television special that aired on NBC on January 25, 1978. Co-produced, written and directed by Rudy De Luca and Barry Levinson, the special featured an early broadcast network appearance of David Letterman. David Frost was co-executive producer. A spoof of TV news magazine programs, the show was part of Frost's new deal with NBC, which also called for a series of six weekly live interview shows to be done in prime-time beginning in May 1978.

== Cast ==
- Alan Oppenheimer as Miles Rathbourne
- David Letterman as Dan Cochran
- Lee Delano as Seedy Man
- Ron Carey as Angelo Bertinelli
- Murphy Dunne as Dr. Burnett
- Michael Fairman as Mayor of Ewell
- Mel Brooks as Adolf Hitler (uncredited)
- James Cromwell as Bernard Mantee (uncredited)
- Royce D. Applegate as Clyde Porter
- Valerie Curtin as Mother Superior
- Byron Webster as Mr. Leonard
- Richard Libertini as Salesman
- Richard Stahl as The D.A.
- Lewis Arquette as Deputy
- Peggy Pope as Prisoner
- Lew Horn as Prisoner
- Lee Delano as Alien Smuggler
- Philip Bruns as Producer
- Larry Hankin as Nutritionist
