= The Illustrated Weekly of India =

English-language weekly newsmagazine in India

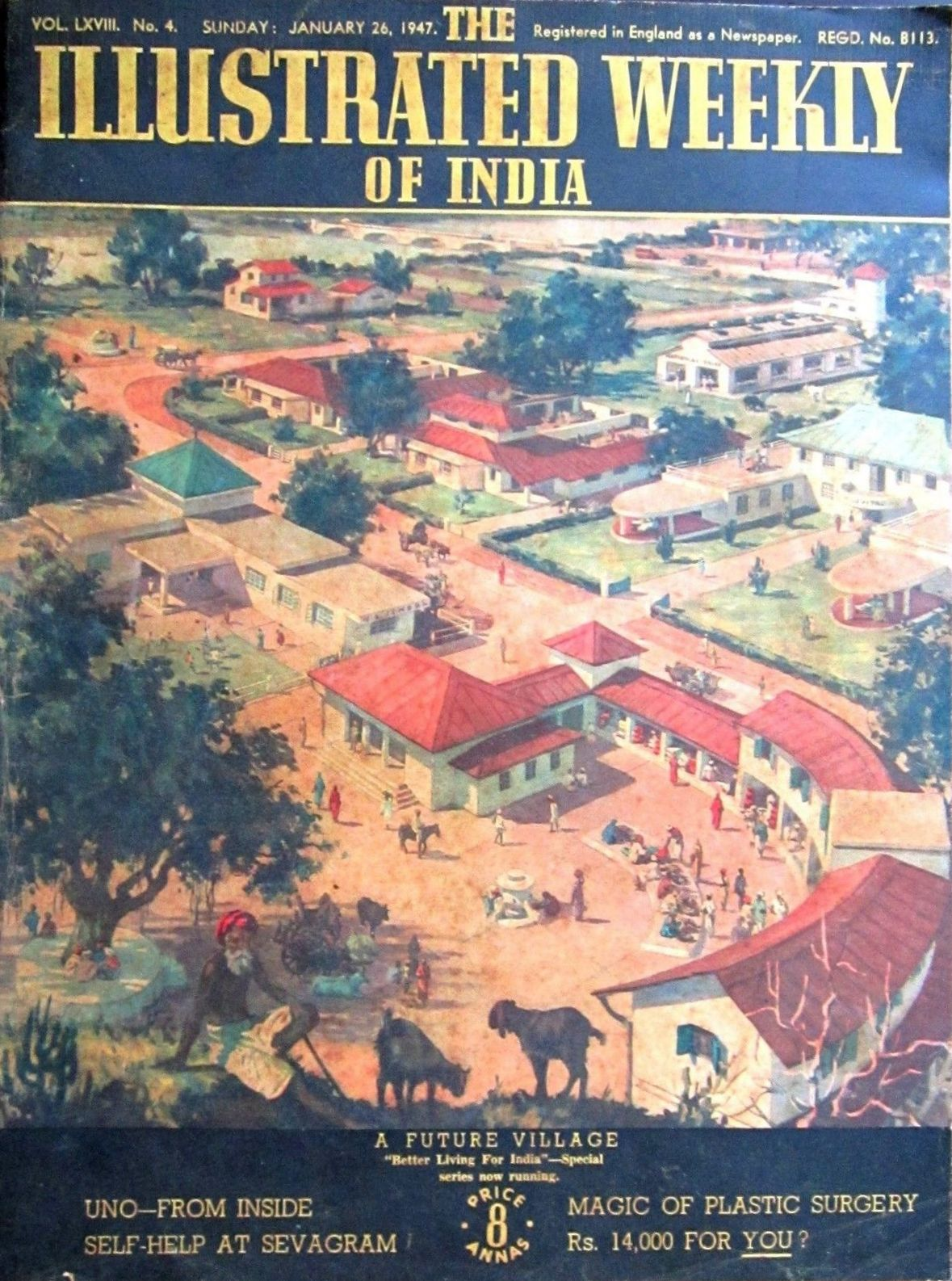
- January 1947 edition's cover page
- Former editors: Sean Mandy, A. S. Raman, Subrata Banerjee, Khushwant Singh, M. V. Kamath, and Pritish Nandy
- Categories: Newsmagazine
- Frequency: Weekly
- Founded: 1880
- First issue: 1880
- Final issue: 13 November 1993
- Company: Times Group
- Country: India
- Language: English

The Illustrated Weekly of India was an English-language weekly newsmagazine publication in India. It started publication in 1880 (as Times of India Weekly Edition; later renamed as The Illustrated Weekly of India in 1923) and ceased publication in 1993. Also simply known as Weekly by its readership, The Illustrated Weekly of India was considered to be an important English-language publication in India for more than a century.

The magazine was edited by Sean Mandy, A. S. Raman, Khushwant Singh, M. V. Kamath, and Pritish Nandy. A. S. Raman was the first Indian editor of The Illustrated Weekly of India, succeeding Sean Mandy. Khushwant Singh took over as editor nearly a year after Raman's formal departure. In between, assistant editor Subrata Banerjee edited the magazine for about 20 months. Cartoons in the latter half of the magazine were by R. K. Laxman and Mario Miranda. Raju Bharatan, Ivan Fera, Nikhil Lakshman, SNM Abdi, Venu Menon, KP Sunil, and Minnie Vaid were some of the regular journalists associated with the weekly. Brahma Chellaney, Khalid Mohamed, and Bachi Karkaria frequently wrote for it, while homeopath Mukesh Batra and writer Mukul Sharma contributed regular columns. Milon Mukherjee and Francis H. D'Sa were illustrators. Photojournalist Palashranjan Bhaumick worked with the weekly from 1986 to 1990.

It is now defunct, having closed down on 13 November 1993.

Many young students of English used it as a regular reading and guide for honing English language skills in vernacular India.

== Closing of The Illustrated Weekly of India ==
In 1993, the publication industry became intensely competitive and the magazines published by The Times of India were losing money. Samir Jain, The owner of the Times of India group, decided to end the publication of The Illustrated Weekly of India, Dharmyug, and similar magazines to focus on revitalisation of the newspapers. The move was widely criticised, however Samir Jain was able to turn the fortunes of Times of India around.
