= St. Xavier's High School, Fort =

St. Xavier's High School

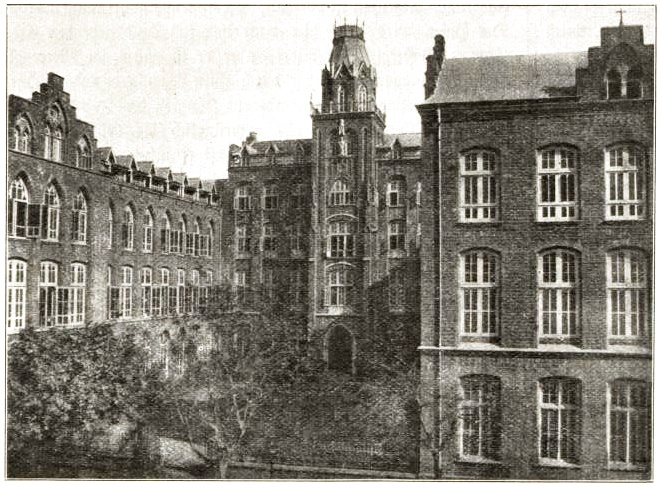
- St. Xavier's High School Mumbai in 1908. Architect: Fr. Karl Wagner, S.J., from Mainz, Germany.

Location
- Fort; Mumbai, Maharashtra; India; 18°56′39″N 72°49′49″E

Information
- Type: Private primary and secondary school
- Motto: Latin: Duc in Altum (Launch out into the deep)
- Religious affiliation: Roman Catholic
- Denomination: Jesuits
- Patron saints: Francis Xavier, SJ
- Established: 1869; 157 years ago
- Authority: Department of Education, Maharashtra
- Director: Fr. Francis Swamy, SJ
- Principal: Thresia Sini
- Grades: K-10
- Gender: Boys
- Enrollment: c. 2000
- Language: English medium
- Website: stxaviersfort.org

St. Xavier's High School, Fort, is a private Catholic primary and secondary school for boys located in Fort, Mumbai, India. The English medium school was founded in 1869 and is run by the Society of Jesus.

== History ==
=== First century ===
The school was built when the Bombay port took on new importance as the "Gateway to India", in the same year as the Suez Canal was built, 1869. At that time it incorporated primary students from the Jesuit St. Mary's on Cavel Street that had been opened in 1860. By 1870 there were eight years of school and a seminary on the premises, with boarding facilities for the St. Mary's boys and seminarians. The 512 students came from diverse religious backgrounds: 337 Catholic, 98 Hindus, 45 Parsis, 20 other Christians, ten Muslims, and two Jews. The top floor became the Jesuit residence, then housing sixteen Jesuits.

Music was taught from 1873 – singing, the harmonium, piano, flute, and violin. A band followed in 1878. Cricket was played at the school since 1874 and football from 1896. German fathers founded and ran the school, but during World War I they were sent to concentration camps; Jesuits from Tarragona Spain and some from Switzerland filled in for them. In 1936, five graduates were in the top twenty among 7,014 successful candidates who passed the Matriculation Examination. In 1940 the East Wing was completed to accommodate the upper standards, including a hall with a capacity for 700. In 1948 a night school was opened with members of the Catholic Young Men's Sodality as staff; it soon had an enrollment of 200 for courses like fitting and mechanics.

=== Memorabilia ===
St. Xavier's occupies the neo-Gothic building it had from its foundation by the Jesuits in 1869. Fragments of its history are visible in the corridors of the primary section in the form of stuffed hunted animals shot by priests during the British Raj. Notable among these is the butterfly and the stuffed tiger on the third floor and bird collection on the first floor. The tiger was donated by the Maharaja of Vanzra, Gujarat, who attended St. Xavier's. The butterfly and bird collection is the work of Brother Navarro, a Spanish Jesuit and a naturalist who was associated with the school. At one corner of the primary quadrangle is a section of a ship's propeller which landed there at the time of the Bombay Harbour Explosion of 1944. St. Xavier's High School is approaching its 150th jubilee.

== Education ==
St. Xavier's follows the SSC board which is the state board of the Government of Maharashtra. It runs classes from standard one to standard ten. The primary (standard one to four) and secondary school occupy different buildings. A class has four sections (A to D) with about fifty students per section.

All students of the secondary school belong to one of four houses - Claver (blue), Gonzaga (yellow), Britto (red), Berchmans (green). These were earlier known as Ashoka (blue), Tilak (yellow), Nehru (red), and Tagore (green). Each house has an elected House Captain from standard ten and a Vice-Captain from standard nine. Additionally, a School Captain and Vice-Captain are elected from standard ten. There is a sports captain and a sports vice captain also. These student representatives maintain student discipline and lead student and ceremonial activities.

== Notable alumni ==
- Arjun Appadurai - anthropologist
- Somnath Bharadwaj - Indian theoretical physicist
- Ashok Chavan - former Chief Minister of Maharashtra
- Charles Correa - architect
- Nari Gandhi - architect
- Sunil Gavaskar - captain of Indian cricket team
- Adi Godrej - Indian businessman and industrialist
- Rais Khan - musician
- Deepak Parekh - banking
- Gautam Rajadhyaksha - photographer
- Milind Rege - former Indian first-class cricketer
- Julio Ribeiro - Police Commissioner of Mumbai, DGP Punjab, Ambassador to Romania
- Homi Sethna - scientist
- Aham Sharma - actor
- Aftab Shivdasani - actor
- Sidharth Shukla - actor
- Soli Sorabjee - Attorney General of India
- Tiku Talsania - Indian film and television actor
- Hosi Vasunia - actor

== Former principals ==
The following individuals have served as principal of the school:

Ordinal	Officeholder	Term start	Term end	Time in office
1	Fr. Joseph Willy, SJ	1869	1870	0–1 years
2	Fr. Anselm Lester, SJ	1870	1873	2–3 years
3	Fr. Henry Depelchin, SJ	1873	1876	2–3 years
4	Fr. Edward De Vos, SJ	1876	1879	2–3 years
5	Fr. Theo Dalhoff, SJ	1879	1884	4–5 years
6	Fr. Julius Mayr, SJ	1884	1890	5–6 years
7	Fr. John Stein, SJ	1891	1897	5–6 years
8	Fr. H. Jurgens, SJ	1897	1900	2–3 years
9	Fr. Jos Hoene, SJ	1900	1902	1–2 years
10	Fr. W. M. Shapter, SJ	1902	1905	2–3 years
11	Fr. Henry Boese, SJ	1905	1908	2–3 years
12	Fr. Jac. Weingartner, SJ	1908	1914	5–6 years
13	Fr. Max Rieke, SJ	1914	1915	0–1 years
14	Fr. Max Riklin, SJ	1915	1923	7–8 years
15	Fr. Anice Deniz, SJ	1923	1930	6–7 years
16	Fr. Florencio Zurbitu, SJ	1930	1930	0 years
17	Fr. Aniceto Deniz, SJ	1931	1936	4–5 years
18	Fr. Aloysius Coyne, SJ	1936	1939	2–3 years
19	Fr. Angelus Solagran, SJ	1939	1945	5–6 years
20	Fr. Sebastian Bonet, SJ	1945	1951	5–6 years
21	Fr. Francis Ribot, SJ	1951	1952	0–1 years
22	Fr. Angelus Solagran, SJ	1952	1955	2–3 years
23	Fr. Richard Pereira, SJ	1955	1957	1–2 years
24	Fr. Fredrick Britto, SJ	1957	1960	2–3 years
25	Fr. Hilary Miranda, SJ	1960	1969	8–9 years
26	Fr. Lancelot Rodricks, SJ	1969	1977	7–8 years
27	Fr. Benjamin Fernandes, SJ	1977	1979	1–2 years
28	Fr. Edmund Caracco, SJ	1979	1986	6–7 years
29	Fr. Joaquim Mascarenhas, SJ	1986	1993	6–7 years
30	Fr. Herman Castelino, SJ	1993	1999	5–6 years
31	Mr. Manuel Raphael	1999	2000	0–1 years
32	Fr. Baptist Pinto, SJ	2000	2010	9–10 years
33	Mrs. Jennifer Dias	2010	2018	7–8 years
34	Mrs. Sharmila Sunny	2018	2020	1–2 years
35	Sr. Thresia Sini	2020	incumbent	5–6 years

== See also ==
- List of Jesuit schools
- List of schools in Mumbai
- List of schools in Malaysia
