= Transylvania 6-5000 (1985 film) =

1985 horror comedy film directed by Rudy De Luca

- Directed by: Rudy De Luca
- Written by: Rudy De Luca
- Produced by: Mace Neufeld; Thomas H. Brodek
- Starring: Jeff Goldblum; Joseph Bologna; Ed Begley Jr.; Carol Kane; Jeffrey Jones; John Byner; Geena Davis; Michael Richards; Donald Gibb; Norman Fell; Teresa Ganzel
- Cinematography: Tomislav Pinter
- Edited by: Harry Keller
- Music by: Lee Holdridge
- Production companies: Balcor Film Investors; Dow Chemical Company; Jadran Film
- Distributed by: New World Pictures
- Release date: November 8, 1985 (U.S.)
- Running time: 93 minutes
- Countries: SFR Yugoslavia; United States
- Language: English
- Budget: $3,000,000
- Box office: $7,196,872 (United States)

Transylvania 6-5000 is a 1985 horror comedy film about two tabloid reporters who travel to modern-day Transylvania to uncover the truth behind Frankenstein sightings. Along the way, they encounter other horror film staples—a mummy, a werewolf, and a vampire—each with a twist.

Written and directed by Rudy De Luca, the film stars Jeff Goldblum, Ed Begley Jr., Joseph Bologna, and Geena Davis. Other notable cast members include Michael Richards, Carol Kane, Teresa Ganzel, John Byner, and Jeffrey Jones. It is an American and Yugoslav co-production.

The title is a pun on "Pennsylvania 6-5000", a song made famous by Glenn Miller.

== Plot ==
Jack Harrison and Gil Turner are writers for The Sensation, a supermarket-grade tabloid run by Turner's father, Mac Turner. When Mac receives a homemade videotape of two panicked men running from a creature they believe to be Frankenstein's monster, along with a waist-down shot of the suspected monster, he dispatches his son and Jack to Transylvania to follow the lead. Jack is told by Mac that if they both again come back with nothing, they are both fired. They have to bring a story that will bring a banner headline "Frankenstein Lives!"

Planes, trains and buses later, Jack and Gil arrive at Transylvania. There, Jack spots Elizabeth Ellison, a tourist from New York City, whom he propositions. Gil sets out on their assignment, just as quickly drawing ridicule when he tries to question hotel desk clerk Danko about the whereabouts of Frankenstein, who shares Gil's inquiries with the staff and patrons, including the mayor Lepescu.

Jack rescues Gil and pulls him out of the hotel to avoid further embarrassment. Seeing them leave, Madame Morovia, a Romani woman, orders her male companion to bring them to her.

Jack and Gil arrive at their hotel, which resembles a 17th-century castle, complete with a gated entrance, but adorned with an "Opening Soon!" banner and signs denoting the acceptance of credit cards. They are met at the gate by Fejos, a butler with an odd sense of humor. They meet for brunch with Lepescu, where they also meet his manservant Radu and his wife Lupi.

After meeting Morovia, who says they must continue their pursuit, Gil and Jack encounter a series of real-life horror creatures, including the Wolfman, Larry, a nymphomaniac vampire Odette, and Twisto, a swamp monster that grabs Gil by the crotch as he tries to escape a face-to-face confrontation with Frankenstein's monster. They eventually learn of a Sicilian doctor, Victorio Malavaqua, who lost his license to practice medicine. Finding out that Malavaqua has been giving care in a sanitorium, Gil tries to go there to make an appointment but is rebuffed by the guard. Gil eventually sneaks in and finds Inspector Percek, head of the local police, and Malavaqua talking about the latter's "experiments", including one involving a patient, Kurt Hunyadi, that fits the description of the Frankenstein monster, which Malavaqua claimed had died. An exhumation of the body later proves otherwise.

Gil learns that Radu is in cahoots with Malavaqua, serving as his lab assistant. Malavaqua also displays a tendency towards madness when within the confines of his laboratory, but returns to normal when he leaves it. It is later revealed, as Gil and Jack go on a search for Elizabeth's missing daughter Laura, that not only has Malavaqua faked Hunyadi's death, but is also his creator, along with that of Odette, Larry, and Twisto. It is also revealed that Malavaqua has engaged in this type of bizarre work to clear his family's name.

Jack is eventually attacked by the Wolfman. In an attempt to rescue Jack, Gil pulls him off Jack, only to be carted off by the Wolfman. The police arrive, but refuse to listen to Jack's story and order him put in the local police lockup. Elizabeth rescues him and learns that the entire police force is at the wine festival instead of searching for Laura. Jack heads off to Malavaqua's lab and Elizabeth goes to the festival. As she is being hauled away by police after confronting Percek, the town is horrified as the monster returns in the flesh, carrying Laura in his arms. Perceived to be dead, it is later learned she was just sleeping.

Jack and Gil arrive, having confronted Malavaqua, and explain Malavaqua's actions to the townspeople, that Malavaqua was legitimately trying to create normal lives for those seen as outcasts or freaks by the townspeople, who now welcome them with open arms.

Finding out that the story is even bigger than what they bargained for, Gil takes enough pictures and both gather enough material to last weeks for the tabloid. They more than make up for their failures and Mac gets his banner headline.

== Cast ==
- Jeff Goldblum as Jack Harrison
- Joseph Bologna as Dr. Malavaqua
- Ed Begley Jr. as Gil Turner
- Carol Kane as Lupi
- Jeffrey Jones as Mayor Lepescu
- John Byner as Radu
- Geena Davis as Odette Balu
- Michael Richards as Fejos
- Donald Gibb as Larry the Wolfman
- Norman Fell as Mac Turner
- Teresa Ganzel as Elizabeth Ellison
- Rudy De Luca as Lawrence Malbot
- Inge Appelt as Madame Morovia
- Božidar Smiljanić as Inspector Percek
- Hotel Desk Clerk Danko (uncredited)

== Production ==
The film was first announced in 1980 under Krofft International, but no progress occurred. Rudy De Luca, Arnie Fishman, and Paul Lichtman unsuccessfully tried to sell the film to New World Pictures for five years. The studio only expressed interest after producers Mace Neufeld and Thomas H. Brodek entered the project. New World Pictures secured financing for the film from the Dow Chemical Company, a company rarely associated with filmmaking. Yugoslav law at the time prevented the company from repatriating funds that it had accumulated in the Yugoslav dinar. To free these frozen funds, Dow decided to use them to invest in a film production inside the country.

According to the DVD commentary from director Rudy De Luca, most of the film was shot on location in Yugoslavia, using local actors. Filming locations included Zagreb, Samobor, and Mokrice Castle. De Luca also mentioned in the commentary that it was the tallest cast he had ever worked with, with Goldblum, Begley, Jones, Davis, Gibb, and Richards all standing over six feet tall.

== Release and reception ==
The film was released theatrically in the United States by New World Pictures on November 8, 1985. It grossed $2,507,542 for the weekend, finishing in fifth place. Overall, it grossed $7,196,872 at the United States and Canada box office against a $3 million budget, making it a modest box office success.

It received mainly negative reviews from critics. The film holds a score of 20% based on 10 reviews, with an average rating of 4.1/10, on review aggregator website Rotten Tomatoes. On Metacritic, the film has a weighted average score of 10 out of 100 based on four reviews, indicating "overwhelming dislike". Audiences polled by CinemaScore gave the film an average grade of "C" on an A+ to F scale.

Entertainment Tonight critic Leonard Maltin gave a notable one-word review of the film. His review began with him swaying along with the Glenn Miller recording; at the point in the song where the words "Pennsylvania 6-5000" are uttered, Maltin spoke the title of the film, followed by the word "stinks." In a later interview with Film Threat magazine, Maltin stated he felt his review was complete and also categorized it as one of the reviews he was most proud of and most remembered for.

=== Home media ===
The film was released on VHS in the United States by New World Video in 1986.

The film was released on DVD in the United States by Anchor Bay Entertainment on April 2, 2002. It was released on Blu-ray by Kino Lorber on February 11, 2020.
