= Dracula: Dead and Loving It =

1995 film by Mel Brooks

- Theatrical release poster
- Directed by: Mel Brooks
- Screenplay by: Mel Brooks; Rudy De Luca; Steve Haberman
- Story by: Rudy De Luca; Steve Haberman
- Based on: Dracula by Bram Stoker
- Produced by: Mel Brooks
- Starring: Leslie Nielsen; Peter MacNicol; Steven Weber; Amy Yasbeck; Lysette Anthony; Harvey Korman; Mel Brooks
- Cinematography: Michael D. O'Shea
- Edited by: Adam Weiss
- Music by: Hummie Mann
- Production companies: Gaumont; Brooksfilms; Castle Rock Entertainment
- Distributed by: Columbia Pictures (through Sony Pictures Releasing; United States and Canada); Gaumont Buena Vista International (France)
- Release dates: December 22, 1995 (United States); April 10, 1996 (France)
- Running time: 90 minutes
- Countries: United States; France
- Language: English
- Budget: $30 million
- Box office: $10.7 million

Dracula: Dead and Loving It is a 1995 supernatural horror comedy film directed by Mel Brooks, from a screenplay by Brooks, Rudy De Luca, and Steve Haberman, and based on a story by De Luca and Haberman. The film stars Leslie Nielsen as Dracula and Brooks as Van Helsing, with Steven Weber, Peter MacNicol, Amy Yasbeck, Lysette Anthony, Harvey Korman, and Anne Bancroft in supporting roles. Although the film is primarily a parody of the 1897 novel Dracula by Bram Stoker, it follows the 1931 film Dracula in its deviations from the novel. It also parodies, among other films, The Fearless Vampire Killers (1967) and Bram Stoker's Dracula (1992), while the visual style and production values are reminiscent of the Hammer Horror films.

Dracula: Dead and Loving It was theatrically released by Columbia Pictures (through Sony Pictures Releasing) in the United States on December 22, 1995, and by Gaumont Buena Vista International in France on April 10, 1996, to critical and commercial failure, grossing $10.7 million against its $30 million production budget. The film is Brooks' last directorial effort to date.

== Plot ==
In 1893, solicitor Thomas Renfield travels from London to "Castle Dracula" in Transylvania to finalize Dracula's purchase of Carfax Abbey in England. Renfield meets Dracula, who unknown to Renfield, is a vampire. Dracula casts a hypnotic spell on Renfield, making him his slave. They soon embark for England. During the voyage, Dracula kills the ship's crew. When the ship arrives and Renfield is discovered alone on the ship, he is confined to a lunatic asylum.

Meanwhile, Dracula visits an opera house, where he introduces himself to his new neighbors: Doctor Seward, the asylum's administrator and head psychiatrist; Seward's daughter, Mina, and her fiancé, Jonathan Harker; and family friend Lucy Westenra. Dracula flirts with Lucy and later that night, enters her bedroom, and drinks her blood.

Mina discovers Lucy still in bed late in the morning, looking strangely pale. Seward, puzzled by the odd puncture marks on her throat, calls in Professor Abraham Van Helsing. Van Helsing informs the skeptical Dr. Seward that Lucy has been attacked by a vampire. Seward and Harker allow garlic to be placed in Lucy's bedroom to repel the vampire, though Seward remains skeptical. After a failed attempt by Renfield to remove the garlic, Dracula uses mind control to get Lucy out of her room and kills her.

Van Helsing meets Dracula and begins to suspect him of being a vampire after the two argue in Moldavian, each attempting to have the last word. Lucy, now a vampire herself, rises from her crypt, drains the blood from her guard, and tries to attack and seduce Harker who is keeping watch over her tomb to see if there is any truth in Van Helsing's belief about Lucy now being a vampire. Van Helsing arrives soon after and instructs Jonathan to lay Lucy's soul to rest by driving a stake through her heart.

Dracula preys on Mina, wanting her to be his undead bride. Dracula spirits Mina away to Carfax Abbey, where they dance, and he drinks her blood. The following morning, Mina tries to seduce Harker. Dr. Seward assumes Jonathan to be seducing Mina and orders him to leave. Van Helsing notices a scarf around Mina's neck and removes it, revealing two puncture marks. Though she lies about how she got them, Van Helsing confirms she has been attacked by a vampire by placing a cross on her hand, which burns a mark into it.

Van Helsing devises a plan to reveal the vampire's secret identity. Both Dracula and Renfield are invited to a ball, where Van Helsing has placed a huge mirror, covered with a curtain, on one of the walls. While Dracula and Mina perform a dance routine, the curtain over the mirror is dropped, revealing that Dracula has no reflection. Dracula grabs Mina and escapes out of a window.

Van Helsing deduces that Renfield is Dracula's slave, and thus might know where he has taken his coffin after a search of Carfax turns up empty. Dracula locks himself in an abandoned church to finish making Mina his bride. His pursuers break down the door, and fighting ensues. Van Helsing, noticing sunlight creeping into the room, opens the blinds. As his body begins to burn, Dracula then attempts to flee, but is inadvertently killed by Renfield.

With Dracula dead, Renfield falls into despair with no master to serve and scrapes Dracula's ashes into the coffin. Seward tells him "you are free, now" and Renfield seems relieved. Dr. Seward calls for Renfield to follow him out of the church, and he follows, responding "yes, master". Van Helsing opens Dracula's coffin and yells in Moldavian to ensure that he has the final word between himself and the count. After the end credits roll, Dracula responds in Moldavian, giving him the true final word.

== Cast ==
- Leslie Nielsen as Count Dracula
- Mel Brooks as Professor Van Helsing
- Peter MacNicol as Thomas Renfield
- Steven Weber as Jonathan Harker
- Amy Yasbeck as Mina Seward
- Lysette Anthony as Lucy Westenra
- Harvey Korman as Dr. Seward
- Anne Bancroft as Madame Ouspenskaya (Gypsy Woman)
- Ezio Greggio as the coachman
- Megan Cavanagh as Essie
- Chuck McCann as Innkeeper
- Mark Blankfield as Martin
- Clive Revill as Sykes
- Gregg Binkley as Woodbridge
- Rudy De Luca as Guard
- Cherie Franklin as Female Peasant on Coach
- Avery Schreiber as Male Peasant on Coach
- David DeLuise as a student in Van Helsing's demonstration

== Production ==
Mel Brooks offered Kelsey Grammer $3 million to play the role of Dracula in the film.

Principal photography began in May 1995 and wrapped in September 1995. Filming took place from May 8 to July 26, 1995, at Culver Studios, California, United States.

== Soundtrack ==
Dracula: Dead And Loving It

Soundtrack album by Hummie Mann
- Released: 1996
- Genre: Film score
- Length: 36:09
- Label: Castle Rock Entertainment

A soundtrack titled Dracula: Dead And Loving It was released 1996 on CD by Castle Rock Entertainment.

1. "Main Title" (2:20)
2. "Faster Horses" (1:07)
3. "Too Dark.. / Limping Shadows / The Web / Hypnotizing Reinfield" (1:35)
4. ""Vampires?" / Gypsy Woman / Dracula's Castle" (2:21)
5. "Reinfield Bleeds / Dracula's Women" (1:55)
6. "Striptease / Bat Flies To Window / Dracula Bites Lucy" (2:00)
7. "Lucy In Bed / Bite Marks? / 3 Tiny Puncture Marks / I Remember Nothing" / Emergency" (3:01)
8. "Dracula In The Garden / Dracula Files, Reinfield Doesn't!" (2:31)
9. "Dracula Attacks Lucy / Funeral / Never Give Up!/ To The Crypt / Lucy Bites Sikes / Concern / Jonathan To The Crypt" (3:11)
10. "Lucy Reacts To The Cross / Dracula Hypnotizes Mina & Essie" (1:16)
11. "To Carfax Abbey / El Choclo" (2:18)
12. "Van Helsing Sees The Mina's Bite" (1:27)
13. "The Kaminsky Two-Step" (1:27)
14. "Hungarian Dance #5" (3:21)
15. "Escape / In Pursuit Of Reinfield / Fight! / Jonathan On The Floor / Attempted Escape" (4:59)
16. "Ucipital Mapillary / Romantic Moment / Finale" (3:30)

== Home media ==
=== DVD ===
Release name	Region 1	Region 2	Notes
Dracula: Dead and Loving It	29 June 2004 (Canada) 14 February 2006 (United States)	14 April 2005 (Denmark) 7 May 2011 (Spain) 7 February 2012 (France)	Commentary by director/co-writer Mel Brooks, co-stars Steven Weber and Amy Yasbeck and co-writers Rudy De Luca and Steve Haberman. Also theatrical trailer and subtitles.

=== Blu-ray ===
Release name	Region 1	Region 2	Notes
Dracula: Dead and Loving It	23 November 2021		Audio commentary by director/co-writer Mel Brooks, co-stars Steven Weber and Amy Yasbeck and co-writers Rudy De Luca and Steve Haberman, "Mel Brooks on Dracula: Dead and Loving It" featurette, "The Making of Dracula: Dead and Loving It" featurette, Theatrical trailers and TV spots

== Reception ==
=== Box office ===
The film debuted at #10. By the end of its run, Dracula grossed $10,772,144.

=== Critical response ===
Critical reaction to Dracula: Dead and Loving It was overwhelmingly negative. On the review aggregator website Rotten Tomatoes, 11% of 37 critics' reviews are positive, with an average rating of 3.2/10. The website's consensus reads: "Lacking any of the comedic bite that audiences have come to expect from a Mel Brooks farce, this vampire parody just plain ol' sucks." Audiences polled by CinemaScore gave the film an average grade of "C" on an A+ to F scale.

James Berardinelli of ReelViews wrote: "Dracula: Dead and Loving It doesn't come close to the level attained by Young Frankenstein. It's a toothless parody that misses more often than it hits. ... Given the comic turn his career has taken since the early '80s, it's hard to believe that Leslie Nielsen was once a serious actor. These days, thanks to the Zucker brothers ... he has become an accomplished satirical performer. His sense of timing is impeccable, and this asset has made him a sought-after commodity for a wide variety of spoofs. Here, Nielsen takes on the title role, but his presence can't resurrect this stillborn lampoon. Unless you're a die hard Mel Brooks fan, there's no compelling reason to sit through Dracula: Dead and Loving It. The sporadic humor promises some laughs, but the ninety minutes will go by slowly."

Joe Leydon of Variety wrote: "Leslie Nielsen toplines to agreeable effect as Count Dracula, depicted here as a dead-serious but frequently flustered fellow who's prone to slipping on bat droppings in his baroque castle. ... Trouble is, while Dead and Loving It earns a fair share of grins and giggles, it never really cuts loose and goes for the belly laughs. Compared with the recent glut of dumb, dumber and dumbest comedies, Brooks's pic seems positively understated. Indeed, there isn't much here that would have seemed out of place (or too tasteless) in comedy sketches for TV variety shows of the 1950s. ... As a result, unfortunately, Dead and Loving It is so mild, it comes perilously close to blandness. ... The only real sparks are set off by MacNicol as Renfield, the solicitor who develops a taste for flies and spiders after being bitten by Dracula."

Mel Brooks said that he met critic Roger Ebert after Ebert had given Dracula: Dead and Loving It a negative review, and lashed out at him, saying, "Listen, you, I made 21 movies. I’m very talented. I’ll live in history. I have a body of work. You only have a body." Roger Ebert wrote that he was "saddened" by the encounter but had to be honest that the movie "just didn't work."

Bruce G. Hallenbeck defended the film in his book Comedy-Horror Films: A Chronological History, 1914-2008, saying it "ranks with Polanski's The Fearless Vampire Killers as one of the greatest vampire comedies ever made." He praised the dry wit, strong performances of all the cast members, and the way the film acts as an affectionate homage to the classic vampire films rather than purely a spoof. He attributed the film's negative reception to its being so targeted towards hardcore enthusiasts of vampire films that general audiences would not pick up on most of the jokes, and to the inevitable comparisons to Brooks's seminal Young Frankenstein.

== See also ==
- Vampire film
- Young Frankenstein
