= Ruchira Gupta =

Sex trafficking abolitionist; business executive

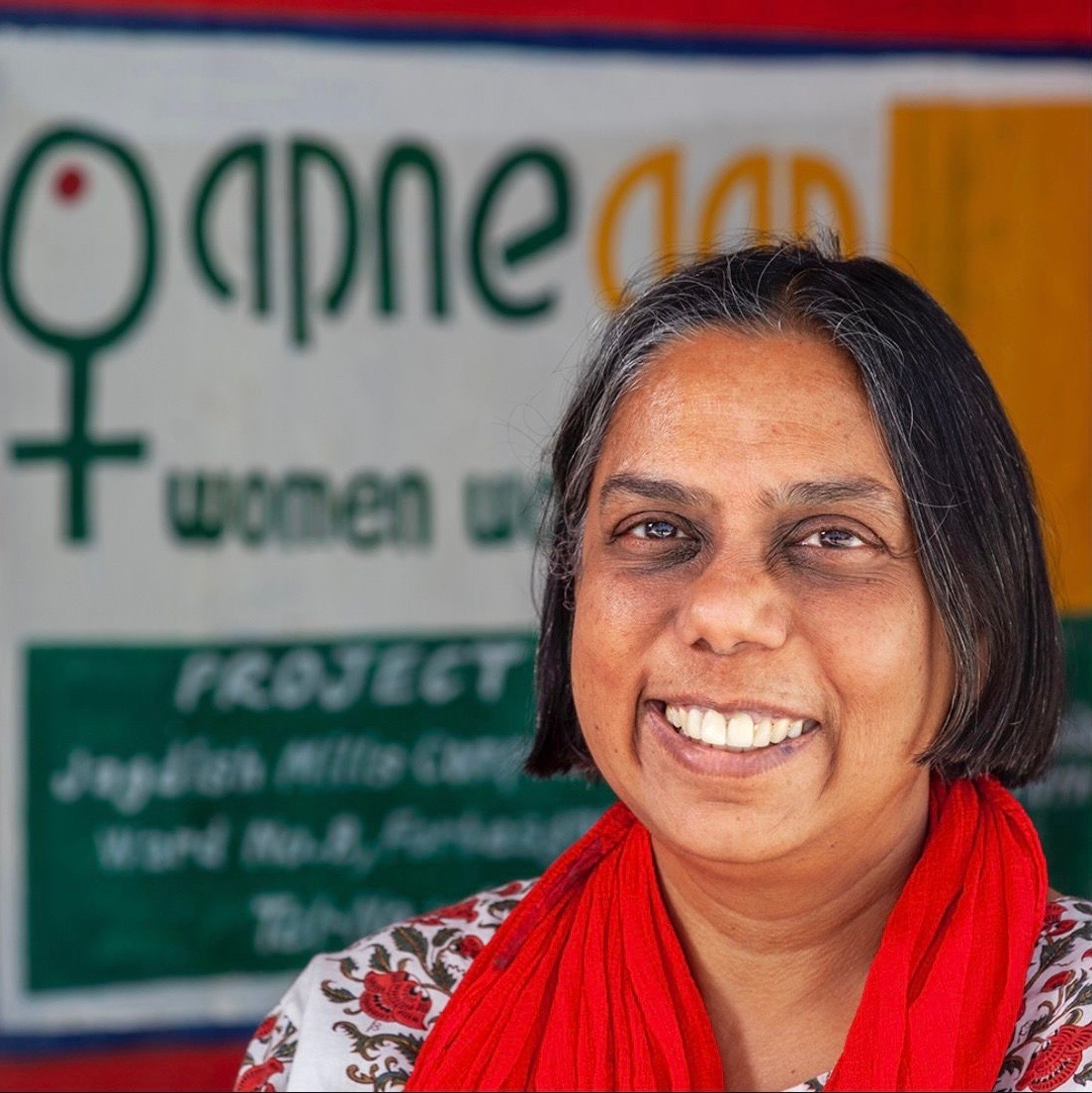
- Gupta in 2020
- Born: 1964 (age 61–62); India
- Education: University of Delhi
- Occupations: Journalist, professor, activist
- Known for: Anti-trafficking activism, founder of Apne Aap Women Worldwide
- Awards: Emmy Award (1997), Clinton Global Citizen Award (2009), French Ordre national du Mérite (2017)
- Website: ruchiragupta.com

Ruchira Gupta is an Indian journalist and activist. She is the founder of Apne Aap, a non-governmental organisation that works for women's rights and the eradication of sex trafficking.

== Journalism and UN career ==
Gupta began her career as a journalist, working for The Telegraph Newspaper (Kolkata, India), The Sunday Observer (Kolkata, India), Business India Magazine (Delhi, India), and British Broadcasting Corporation (BBC) South Asia (Delhi, India). During her journalism career, she extensively covered women's rights, armed struggles in the north-east of India, caste conflict, and minority issues. She continues to write extensively on sex trafficking and women's rights issues for Open Democracy, Pass Blue, CNN, Times of India, The Hindu, The Guardian, among others.

She then moved on to the United Nations, where she worked with the governments of Iran, Nepal, Thailand, Cambodia, Laos, Vietnam, Myanmar, Indonesia, Kosovo, and the Philippines. She supported some of these countries to develop National Action Plans and laws against human trafficking. She has written two manuals on combating trafficking for law enforcement and prosecutors, supported by UNODC and UNIFEM. Gupta also served as a UNICEF contact in October 2000 for the first-ever gathering of Messengers of Peace (Goodwill Ambassadors).

Her publications on trafficking include:

- Trafficking Responses in Thailand, Burma, Cambodia, Laos, Vietnam, the Philippines, and Indonesia: Needs, Capacity assessment and Recommendations
- Trafficking in the Asia and Near East region: Problem analysis and Proposed framework for response; Kosovo plan of action to counter trafficking in persons
- Manual for law-enforcement officers to confront Demand for Human trafficking
- Training Manual for Prosecutors - On Confronting Human Trafficking

== Activism career ==
After completing her documentary, The Selling of Innocents, Ruchira founded Apne Aap Women Worldwide, where she has served as president since 2002. Through her work at Apne Aap, Gupta has given voice to the voiceless by organizing victims and survivors from denotified tribes (labeled criminal tribes by the British), who are trapped in inter-generational prostitution, into Self-empowerment groups. Through these groups, women and girls access education, livelihood training, legal protection and safe housing; and also campaign for changes in the Indian Law. Gupta's leadership in organizing women to campaign for legal change resulted in trafficking being made a penal offense for the first time in Indian history, through the Criminal Law Amendment Act.

Her work in organizing denotified tribes has resulted in two red-light areas in Forbesgunge, Bihar shrinking from 72 brothels to 15 brothels, and 17 to one. Gupta continues to ensure women are able to transform their places of exploitation into safe spaces for education, job training, loan access and legal protection. Along with staff from Apne Aap, Gupta petitioned on behalf of survivors of trafficking to the Patna High Court to take action against traffickers and protect victims. On 10 March 2013, a notice was issued by the court to the Bihar government to report back on actions taken against trafficking. Apne Aap has also challenged police corruption and is campaigning for police reform after a staff member from the Nat Denotified Tribe was wrongfully arrested after exposing a trafficking ring. Apne Aap continues to campaign for police reform across India. They also appealed to the National Human Rights Commission of India to challenge police atrocities against Apne Aap staff members who are from denotified tribes.

As part of Gupta's activist career, she also organizes Survivor Conferences and produces the Redlight Dispatch, a newspaper written by and for victims and survivors of prostitution. She has addressed the UN General Assembly two times., the UN Security Council once, and the UN Human Rights Council once to advocate for policies and mechanisms to support victims of trafficking. Her leadership in this area was referenced by feminist activist, Catharine MacKinnon, in her speech: Trafficking, Prostitution and Inequality.

Gupta has testified before the United States Senate, advocating for the passage of the Victims of Trafficking and Violence Protection Act of 2000 and lobbied with other activists at the United Nations for the U.N. Protocol to Prevent, Suppress and Punish Trafficking in Persons. This resulted in the first U.N. effort to address demand for trafficking .

Ruchira Gupta has helped more than 20,000 girls, women and their family members in red-light areas and slums of India in the last 12 years. through her NGO Apne Aap. Her work is featured by Nick Kristof in 21st Century Slavery in New York Times, in his book Half the Sky. Lucy Liu has directed a movie Meena on Ruchira rescuing a girl in Bihar based on Kristof's report. Gloria Steinem has blogs about Ruchira's Work in a-constant-battle-against-the-sale-of-bodies-in-bihar in the New York Times. You can watch a conversation between Gloria Steinem and Ruchira at the Jaipur Literature Festival in January this year.

Earlier, Ruchira worked with Hillary Clinton and her aides for the passage of the Trafficking Victims Protection Act by testifying to the US Senate and recommending draft language that would positively and realistically help victims and survivors. She was a member of the first Global Advisory Council of Vital Voices set up by Mrs. Clinton.

Later she helped create the first UN Protocol to end sex-trafficking as well as the Trafficking Fund for Survivors at the United Nations by addressing the UN General Assembly on behalf of survivors and taking a panel of survivors to speak at the UN General Assembly in New York alongside Secretary General Ban Ki-moon and High Commissioner for Human Rights, Navi Pillai.

She has opened groundbreaking avenues within India for survivors to communicate their ideas by rallying their voices for the successful passage of Section 370 .IP.C India's first law on trafficking after the infamous bus rape in Dec, 2012.

Apne Aap has entered a South-South anti-trafficking partnership with NGOs in South Africa, USA, France, and Nepal using its model of community organising. She has spoken before the South African, Iceland, and French parliaments to support stricter mechanisms to prevent trafficking in women and girls.

Her Ted Talk and a PBS documentary, Adventure Divas, explain how and why she reaches the "last" girl who is poor, female, a teenager and person of low-caste/colour, marginalized ethnicity who cannot take any decision for herself-to be married or go to school, to play or help with chores, to be prostituted or be a domestic workers, to have a baby or not...

== Awards and recognition ==
In 2009, Gupta was the recipient of the Clinton Global Citizen Award for Commitment to Leadership in Civil Society by the Clinton Foundation, established by Bill Clinton, former President of the United States. In 2010, she was chosen to serve as a member of the organization's leadership program, known as CGI Lead. President Clinton created the program to recognize and educate the next generation of global leaders and prepare them to effectively address and take action on the world's most pressing issues. Young leaders chosen from throughout the world include corporate executives, public servants, social entrepreneurs, and NGO managers from among the public, private, and civil sectors.

In 2007, Gupta was honored with the Abolitionist Award by the House of Lords, which is the upper house of the Parliament of the United Kingdom. Her documentary The Selling of Innocents, on sex-trafficking in Nepal and India, won a News & Documentary Emmy Award in 1996.

Gupta sat on the Steering Committee for the Planning Commission of the Government of India for the Eleventh and Twelfth Five-Year Plans, once for Women and Children and once for Social Welfare. She was also on the working group of the Ministry of Women and Children. She has served on the advisory boards of Asia Society, New York, Cents for Relief, US, Nomi Network, US, Ricky Martin Foundation, and Vital Voices, Washington DC. Gupta has been honored at the White House for her work to combat sex trafficking.

In 2011 Lucy Liu released her 20-minute directorial debut on human trafficking, Meena, which tells the story of a rescue mission to help a young woman save her daughter from the cycle of the sex trade. Meena Haseena was sold to the sex trade by her uncle at the age of 8 years old, and this film portrays her alliance with Ruchira Gupta and their effort to rescue her daughter from the brothel she only recently escaped herself. Her fight to save her daughter Naina, who had been taken from her at birth, and forced into prostitution is the heart of this film and is based on the first chapter of the book Half the Sky, written by Nicholas Kristof and Sheryl WuDunn.

In 2012 Ruchira Gupta was featured in the documentary Half the Sky: Turning Oppression into Opportunity for Women Worldwide premiering on PBS October 1 and 2. The series highlights women and girls living in oppression who are bravely fighting to challenge it. The Half the Sky PBS TV series is produced by Show of Force along with Fugitive Films.

On 25 September 2014, Ruchira Gupta was honored among 35 other women by the All Ladies League (ALL) in Delhi for their various achievements. The ALL is the country's first all-women chamber which held its Grassroots Women of the Decade Achievers Awards.

On 8 March 2015, Gupta gave the keynote speech at the NGO Committee on the Status of Women New York (NGOCSW/NY) Forum at the Apollo, to commence the start of the UN CSW 59 Consultation Day. On the following day, she was awarded the 2015 NGOCSW/NY Woman of Distinction Award for her tireless efforts to end sex trafficking by emphasizing the link between trafficking and prostitution laws and lobbying policy makers to shift blame from victims to perpetrators.

== Documentaries ==
Documentaries that Gupta has worked on include:

- The Brotherhood. The RSS, BBC. 1993.
- Zero Hour. A 13 episode Indian Quiz show with Parliamentarians. BITV. 1994.
- The Selling of Innocents. Documentary on sex-trafficking from Nepal to Mumbai, India, screened on CBC and HBO. 1997.
- Kali’s Smile: BBC Radio 4, documentary on role of Gods and goddesses in Indian popular culture. 1998.
- Shiva's wedding: BBC Radio 4, documentary on role of Gods and goddesses in Indian popular culture. 1998.
- Rape for Profit. (Life in the Mumbai Brothel): Newsnight, BBC. 1999.
- Saffron Warriors - Series 3 of Unreported World, Channel 4, UK, 2003 on Nazi style Hindu fundamentalism in India.
- Land of the Missing Children - Series 9 of Unreported World, Channel 4, UK, 2005, on teenage sex-slavery in India.
- Paul Merton in India, BBC, Channel 5, UK. 2008.

She also contributed to the scripted film Meena: Based On A True Story, Lucy Liu, Colin K. Gray, and Megan Raney, 2011.

== Committees ==
- Move to End Violence: Building Movement for Social Change. Advisory Committee Member.
- Steering Committee Member and contributor to Report on Empowerment of Women and Development of Children for the Eleventh Plan.
- Government of India, Planning Commission (Social Justice and Welfare Division, 2011).

== Bibliography ==
- Gupta, Ruchira (2011), "Pornography in India", in Tankard Reist, Melinda; Bray, Abigail (eds.), Big Porn Inc.: exposing the harms of the global pornography industry, North Melbourne, Victoria: Spinifex Press, pp. 239–248, ISBN 9781876756895.
