= Fardunjee Marzban =

Printer and newspaper editor

Fardunjee Marzaban or Fardoonjee Marazban (22 August 1787– 17 March 1847) was, among other things, a printer and a newspaper editor. He established the first vernacular printing press in Bombay, India. He also started India’s oldest running periodical called the Bombay Samachar, which was printed primarily in Gujarati. He pioneered vernacular journalism in India, as also the production of Gujarati types.

== Life and work ==
Fardunjee Marzban was born at Surat in 1787 into a family of Parsi-Zoroastrian priests in Gujarat, and initially trained for the priesthood. His father and grandfather had been scholars of Zoroastrian religious literature (i.e. Middle Persian and Avestan texts), and Marzban followed their example.

In 1805, Fardunji went to Bombay and learnt Persian and Arabic languages under Mulla Feroze. In 1808, Fardunji opened a book-bindery.

It was while working as a book binder that he met the printer Jijibhai Chhapghar. Perhaps it was his interaction with Jijibhai Chhapghar that inspired Fardunji to open an Indian printing press.

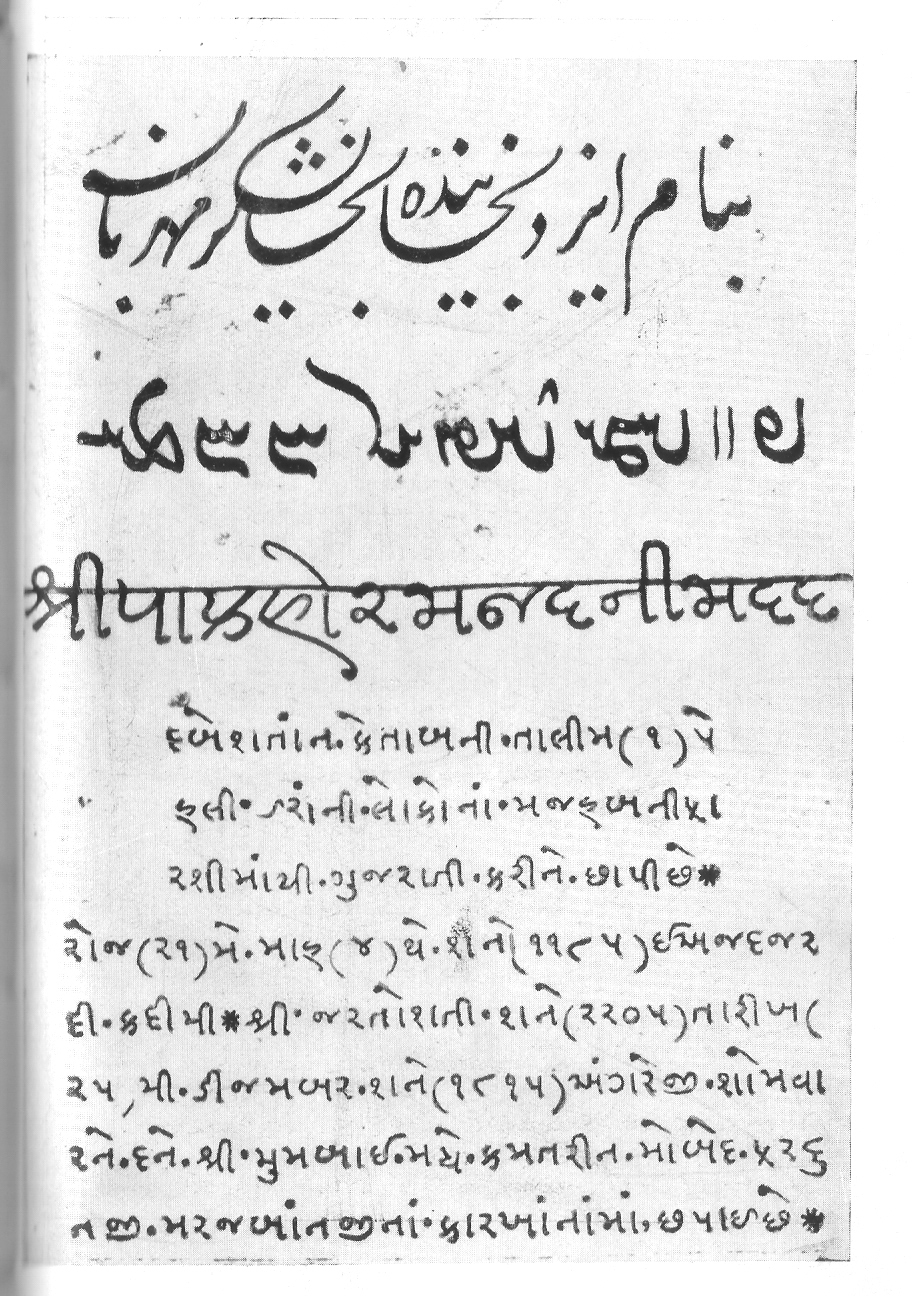
A Page from Fardunji's Dabistān-i Mazāhibm (1815)

The press was set up in 1812, but the first book would not be printed until 1814. This book would be an Almanac for the Hindu Samvat Year 1871. No copy of the work survives.

Between 1814 and 1822 he printed several other works. In 1815 he printed a Gujarati translation of the Persian book Dabistān-i Mazāhibm, which he had himself prepared. The work was priced at Rs 15 per copy. In 1817 he published a Gujarati translation of the Khordeh Avesta.

Later, he would also publish translations of the Shahnameh in 1833, the Gulistan in 1838, the Bostan (posthumously in 1849). He even published a Persian dictionary in 1833.

Fardunji’s Bombay Samachar, which started off as a weekly paper, priced at Rs 2 per month, was turned into a daily in 1832. It would serve as a template for the foundation of several other Parsi-run newspapers, including the Indian Spectator (later the Voice of India) and the Bombay Times (now a supplement of the Times of India).

1832 was not a fortuitous year for Fardunji Marzban. He had to withdraw from the Bombay Samachar that year. It appears that his printing Gujarati translations of Parsi scriptures caused great controversy. In addition to this, he also lost his trading ship (which traded with China) that he owned. The ship was called Hindustan. Perhaps because of these double losses in his journalistic enterprise and trade, he had to leave Bombay.

He went to Daman, then a Portuguese settlement, where he practiced medicine. He died on 23 March 1847.

== See also ==
- Bhimjee Parikh
