= Jam-e-Jamshed =

Jam-e-Jamshed (Gujarati: જામે જમશેદ) is a weekly Mumbai newspaper published partly in Gujarati and mainly in English. The Jam-e-Jamshed is the second oldest newspaper in Asia. The paper was originally published as a weekly from 12 March 1832. In 1853, it was converted into a daily but facing financial pressures in the 1960s it yet again became a weekly.

The paper primarily covers issues of interest to the Zoroastrian community in India. Circulation is not just restricted to the Indian Parsi and Irani, the publication is also popular among the Zoroastrian diaspora and Gujarati Bohra communities. Articles are posted here. Cyrus Contractor's and Meher contractor's articles are seen here
