= Bombay Samachar =

Indian newspaper

Mumbai Samachar
- Type: Daily newspaper
- Format: Broadsheet
- Owner: Cama family
- Founder: Fardunjee Marzban
- Editor: Nilesh M Dave
- Founded: 1822
- Language: Gujarati
- Headquarters: Horniman Circle, Fort, Mumbai, India
- Price: 4 Rs
- Website: bombaysamachar.com

Mumbai Samachar is the oldest continuously published newspaper in Asia. Established in 1822 by Fardunjee Marzban, it is published in Gujarati and English.

== History ==
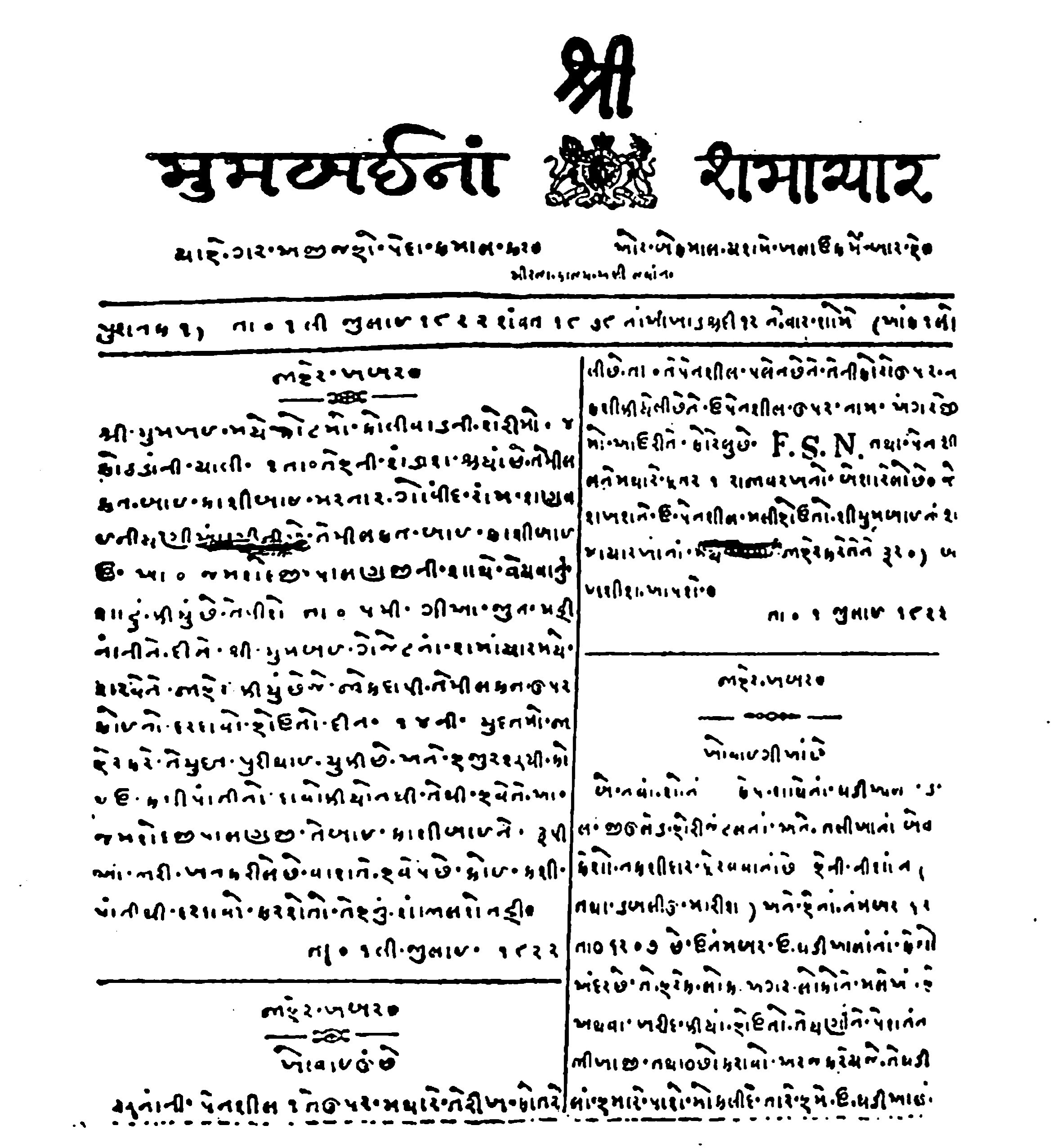
First page of the first issue

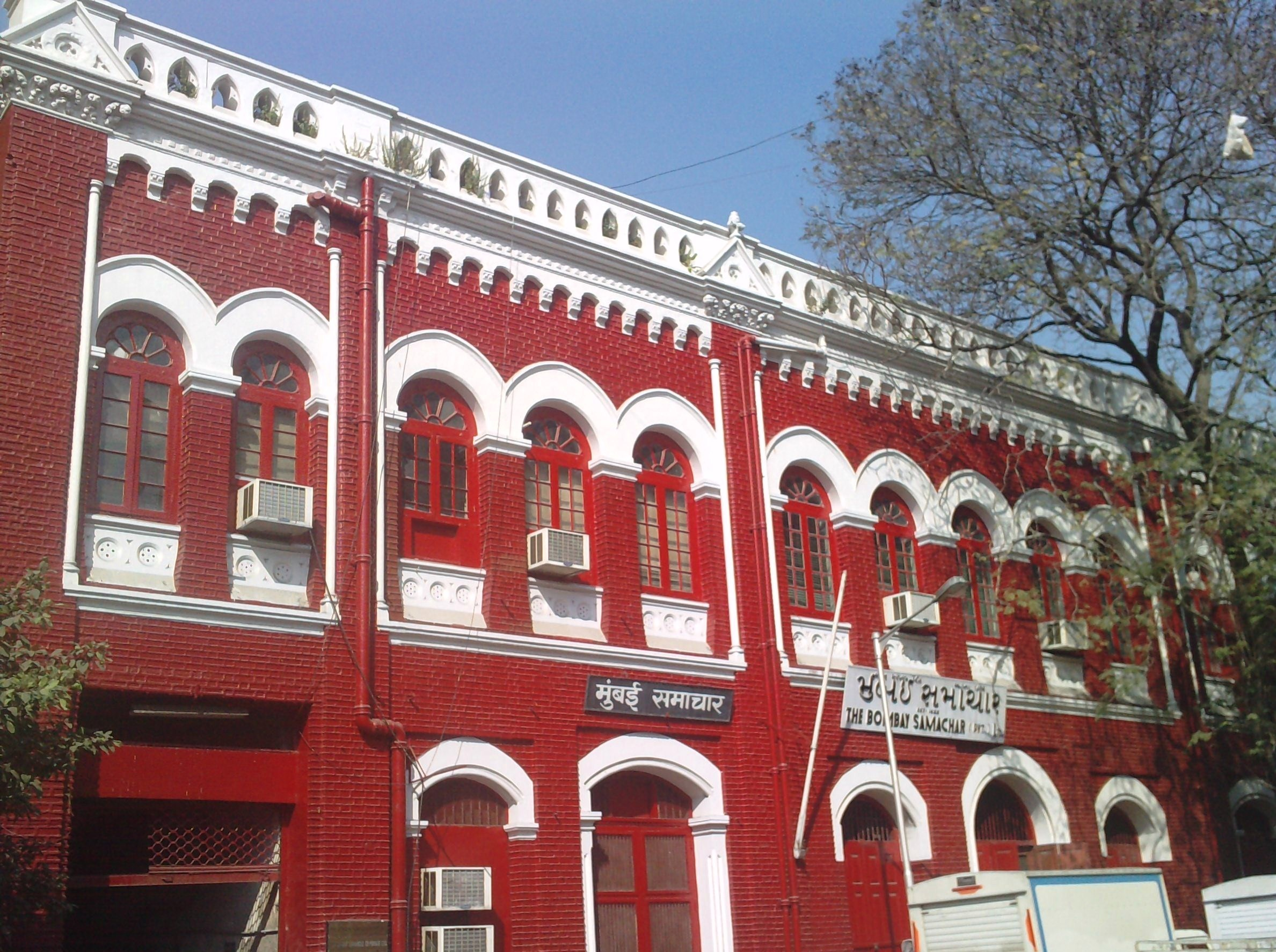
Bombay Samachar Building

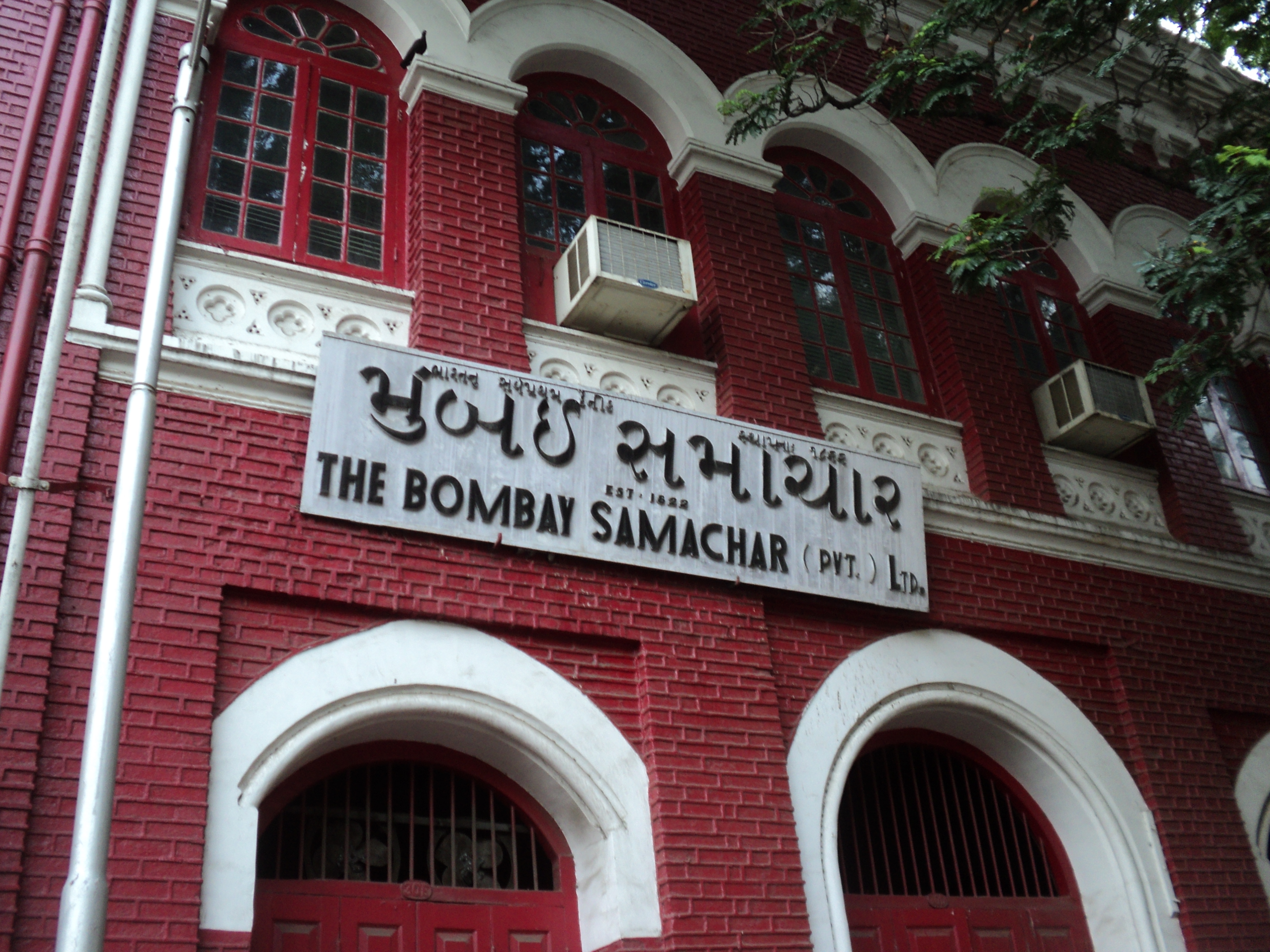
Mumbai Samachar Headquarters in Mumbai

The Mumbai Samachar, Asia's oldest continuously published newspaper, was first published on the first of July 1822 and comprised three small quarto sheets. 10 inches by 8 inches, and a half sheet supplement in all containing 14 pages of printed matter.

A brief description of the contents of this first issue will give an idea of what an Indian journal was in those days. The first sheet consists of advertisements, two of these being about things lost, and one about the sale of some property, all relating to Parsis. Then follows what may be called an article on "Ourselves". Then there are four columns of short paragraphs about Government and Court appointments and changes, and powers of attorney taken from the court; about the arrival and departure of ships and of Europeans from Mumbai; and a list of European deaths; as well as of ships loading in the harbour. Six columns are given to Calcutta (now Kolkata) news taken from the Indian Gazette and the Calcutta Chronicle; one column to Madras (now Chennai) news from the Government Gazette of that city; two columns to London news, whilst a short paragraph of ten lines is devoted to news from Canton in China, given the prices of opium. Of local Mumbai news there is very little, except the short paragraph about appointments above.

A weekly till 1832, a bi-weekly till 1855 and a daily since then, it continued to grow and has gone on to become one of Western India's premier newspapers, well read by a large segment of Gujarati-speaking people both in India and abroad. The founder, a Parsi scholar and priest by the name of Fardoonji Murazban, was a pioneer not only of journalism in Western India but of all Gujarati printed literature. He founded the first native press in 1812 and in 1814 brought out a Gujarati Calendar, fully 6 years before the first Bengali calendar was printed and published in Calcutta. He then went on to bring out his Newspaper, the Mumbai Samachar, in 1822.

He must have started all his concerns in auspicious moments, for all, his press, his calendar and his paper exist to the present day in very good and flourishing condition. Respected by both the British and Indian Government for its fair, frank, objective and critical analysis of events, the Mumbai Samachar played a very important role during India's struggle for independence being often quoted by freedom fighters like Mahatma Gandhi, Jawaharlal Nehru, Vallabhbhai Patel and others. From its inception the editorial policy was to objectively report events in a fair and honest manner and not to sensationalize news, sobriety and independence of views being a characteristic which still stands. Another notable feature of this paper which holds good to this day is the policy to allow numerous small advertisers to advertise their products on the front page rather than allow only one advertiser to occupy what is commonly referred to as solus position.

The paper passed through various hands before coming into the hands of the Cama Family, its present publishers in 1933, and Hormusji N Cama, the present director of the publication. It has since grown and expanded and today can proudly lay claim to having the most modern technology available in the publishing field. Its daily print run in four colour is effortlessly carried out on full colour high speed offset presses incorporating state of the art features.

On 14 June 2022, Prime Minister Narendra Modi participated in the Dwishatabdi Mahotsav of Mumbai Samachar and released a postage stamp to commemorate the occasion of 200 years of Mumbai Samachar.
