= Norman, Is That You? =

1970 play by Ron Clark and Sam Bobrick

- Written by: Ron Clark; Sam Bobrick
- Characters: Ben Chambers; Beatrice Chambers; Norman Chambers

Premiere
- Date: 1970
- Place: Lyceum Theatre

Norman, Is That You? is a 1970 play in two acts by American playwrights Ron Clark and Sam Bobrick about a Jewish couple coming to terms with their son's homosexuality. The work is notably the first play written by both writers. After 19 preview performances, the play officially opened on Broadway on February 19, 1970, at the Lyceum Theatre. It closed after only 12 more performances on February 28, 1970. The production was directed by George Abbott and starred Martin Huston as Norman Chambers, Walter Willison as Garson Hobart, Lou Jacobi as Ben Chambers, Dorothy Emmerson as Mary, and Maureen Stapleton as Beatrice Chambers.

In his review of the play, Clive Barnes of The New York Times wrote,

It is strange how tastes and standards change. It seems only yesterday that we had plays such as The Green Bay Tree or even Tea and Sympathy which handled the then vexed subject of homosexuality with silk gloves ... Here for the first time was a homosexual play aimed at the theater-party set. It is called Norman, Is That You? and it seems that it is him.

== Plot ==
Ben Chambers, a drycleaner, and his wife Beatrice are having marital problems. Beatrice leaves her husband for his brother and Ben decides to take off for New York City to visit his son, Norman. Ben finds his son in a romantic relationship with another man, Garson Hobart. Determined to set his son on the straight and narrow path of heterosexuality, Ben hires Mary, a prostitute, to try to entice his son into pursuing women. The attempt backfires and Ben ultimately comes to the conclusion that his son is gay and that there is nothing he can do to change that. At this point, Beatrice shows up and, unaware of the prior events that have transpired, is shocked to learn her son is gay. She too ultimately comes to accept her son. When Norman joins the Navy, the couple invites Garson to come and live with them, an offer which he accepts.

== Reception and successive productions ==
While critics had positive things to say about Jacobi and Stapleton's performances, overall the production was not received well by New York critics. However, since then the play has garnered considerable more success in revivals. From the beginning the show became a popular choice for American community theatres during the 1970s.

Arthur Lesser mounted the first international production in Paris in 1971 where it was very well received. Lesser also mounted successful productions in Scandinavia, Spain, and London during the 1970s. The production has had performances in more than 35 countries. Also in 1971, James Wheaton directed and starred in a version at the Ebony Showcase Theater in Los Angeles, which substitutes an African American family for a Jewish family. It ran at the Ebony for seven years, becoming one of the longest-running plays in Los Angeles theatre history.

Rowan & Martin's Laugh-In purchased the film rights to the play in 1970 and a film adaptation (Norman... Is That You?) was released in 1976. The film version stars Redd Foxx and Pearl Bailey.
