= Sunday Times of India =

The Sunday Times is the weekly edition of The Times of India which is owned by Bennett, Coleman & Co. Limited. It is the largest circulated periodical newspaper and one of the highest circulated weekly newspapers in India. It was the highest circulated weekly newspaper in 2012 and 2013.

== Circulation by year ==
- 2012 - 1,071,963
- 2013 - 1,041,047
- 2016 - 1,124,568
- 2017 - 1,124,568
- 2018 - 1,053,164
- 2019 - 1,006,056
