= Murder at the Howard Johnson's =

1979 Play by American playwrights Ron Clark and Sam Bobrick

1979 playbill cover

Murder at the Howard Johnson's is a 1979 play in two acts by American playwrights Ron Clark and Sam Bobrick. The production officially opened on Broadway at the John Golden Theatre after 10 preview performances on May 17, 1979; closing just three days later after only four more performances. The production was directed by Marshall W. Mason and starred Bob Dishy as Paul Miller, Tony Roberts as Mitchell Lovell, and Joyce Van Patten as Arlene Miller.

== Premise ==
The play is a dark comedy about a love triangle between a woman and two men who try to murder each other.
