= Ron Clark (writer) =

Canadian-American playwright and screenwriter (born 1933)

- Born: 1933 (age 92–93) Montreal, Canada
- Occupation: Playwright, screenwriter
- Genre: Fiction, comedy

Ron Clark (born 1933) is a Canadian-American playwright and screenwriter best known for several plays that he co-wrote with Sam Bobrick and for co-writing the screenplays for the films Silent Movie, High Anxiety, and Life Stinks with Mel Brooks.

== Career ==
Clark began his career writing for TV during the 1960s, including such shows as The Smothers Brothers Comedy Hour and The Danny Kaye Show. He wrote plays in the 1970s with fellow writer Sam Bobrick. Their first play, Norman, Is That You?, premiered on Broadway at the Lyceum Theatre on February 19, 1970. The two men went on to write several more plays together, including No Hard Feelings (1973), Murder at the Howard Johnson's (1979), and Wally's Cafe (1981).

Clark remained active in writing for television and film up through the early 1990s. His many television credits include That Girl (1970), Silver Spoons (1985–1987), and Moonlighting (1989), among others.

He also co-wrote the screenplays to the films Silent Movie (1976), High Anxiety (1977), Revenge of the Pink Panther (1978), and Life Stinks (1991).

== Credits ==
- Snuffy Smith and Barney Google (1963) (TV)
- The Danny Kaye Show (1963) (TV)
- The Jimmy Dean Show (1963) (TV)
- The Smothers Brothers Comedy Hour (1967–1968) (TV)
- That Girl (1970) (TV)
- Norman, Is That You? (with Sam Bobrick) (1970) (Stage)
- The Singles (with Sam Bobrick) (1972) (TV)
- This Week in Nemtim (with Sam Bobrick, Saul Turteltaub and Bernie Orenstein) (1972) (TV)
- The Paul Lynde Show (1972) (TV)
- No Hard Feelings (with Sam Bobrick) (1973) (Stage)
- Hot l Baltimore (1975) (TV)
- Silent Movie (with Mel Brooks, Barry Levinson and Rudy De Luca) (1976)
- Norman, Is That You? (with Sam Bobrick and George Schlatter) (1977)
- High Anxiety (with Mel Brooks, Barry Levinson and Rudy De Luca) (1977)
- Revenge of the Pink Panther (with Blake Edwards and Frank Waldman) (1978)
- Murder at the Howard Johnson's (with Sam Bobrick) (1979) (Stage)
- Wally's Cafe (with Sam Bobrick) (1981) (Stage)
- E/R (1985) (TV)
- Silver Spoons (1985–1987) (TV)
- The World According to Me (1986) (Stage)
- The Van Dyke Show (1988) (TV)
- Moonlighting (1989) (TV)
- Life Stinks (1991) (Story Only)
- The Man in the Family (1991) (TV)
- Baby Talk (1991) (TV)
- The Last Laugh (2019) (Netflix) (Actor)
