= Sam Bobrick =

American writer (1932–2019)

- Born: July 24, 1932; Chicago, Illinois, U.S.
- Died: October 11, 2019 (aged 87); Northridge, California, U.S.
- Occupations: Playwright, screenwriter
- Writing career
- Genres: Fiction, comedy

Sam Bobrick (July 24, 1932 – October 11, 2019) was an American author, playwright, television writer, and lyricist.

== Early life ==
Bobrick was born to a Jewish family in Chicago on July 24, 1932. His father was a storekeeper and his mother worked for the postal service. In 1950 he graduated from Benton Harbor High School in Michigan. After a three-year, nine-month, twenty-seven-day stint in the U.S. Air Force between 1951–1955, Bobrick attended the University of Illinois where he graduated with a degree in journalism.

== Career ==
He began his career writing for the popular children's show Captain Kangaroo. He also wrote for such shows as The Andy Griffith Show, Bewitched, The Flintstones, Get Smart, The Kraft Music Hall, and The Smothers Brothers Comedy Hour. He created the short-lived Disney Channel TV series Good Morning, Miss Bliss, which was resurrected by NBC as the long-running hit show Saved by the Bell. He won three Writers Guild of America Awards for his television work and was nominated for an Emmy. He also wrote several movies and later quit writing for film and television in 1990.

Bobrick wrote over 40 plays. His first play, Norman, Is That You?, which he co-wrote with Ron Clark, opened on Broadway in the early 1970s. While a flop on Broadway, its West Coast premiere at the Ebony Showcase Theater in Los Angeles ran for seven years (1971–1978). The play also ran for five years in Paris (Pauvre France) and has played in over thirty countries around the world. Bobrick and Clark collaborated on three more Broadway plays, No Hard Feelings, Murder at the Howard Johnson's, and Wally's Cafe.

Bobrick's solo works included the plays, Remember Me? Getting Sara Married, Last Chance Romance, Hamlet II (Better than the Original), New York Water, Passengers and The Crazy Time. He also wrote a number of mystery plays, among them Flemming, An American Thriller, The Spider or the Fly, Death in England and A Little Bit Wicked. In 2011, his mystery play The Psychic won the Mystery Writers of America's Edgar Award.

With his wife Julie Stein he wrote two plays: Lenny's Back, about comedian Lenny Bruce, which was nominated for a Los Angeles Ovation Award, and The Outrageous Adventures of Sheldon & Mrs. Levine, an adaption of their book Sheldon & Mrs. Levine.

Bobrick co-wrote the song The Girl of My Best Friend with Beverly Ross which was a hit for Elvis Presley with the Jordanaires. Another song, It Will Never Be Over For Me was recorded by Los Lobos. He also wrote two satirical albums for Mad: Mad Twists Rock n Roll and Fink Along With Mad. He co-wrote "Totally Twisted Country" with his son Joey for the band the Cow Pies.

Bobrick was a member of the Stage Directors and Choreographers Society, as well as the Dramatists Guild and Writers Guild of America. He directed many of his plays in regional theatres in the U.S. and Canada.

== Death ==
Bobrick died on October 11, 2019, at age 87, shortly after suffering a stroke. His second marriage was to Julie Stein in 2000. His first marriage was to Jeanne Johnson in 1963, ending in divorce in 1990. Bobrick had three children.
