= Sidney Glazier =

American film producer

- Born: May 29, 1916; Philadelphia, Pennsylvania, United States
- Died: December 14, 2002 (aged 86); Bennington, Vermont, United States
- Occupation: Producer

Sidney Glazier (May 29, 1916 – December 14, 2002) was an American film producer best known for his work on the Mel Brooks film The Producers.

== Early life ==
Glazier was born in Philadelphia on May 29, 1916, the second of three sons born to Jewish émigré parents Jake Glazier and Sophie Schekid from Minsk. His elder brother, Tom Glazer, became a composer, guitarist, and folk singer. His father, a carpenter, died during the 1918 flu epidemic, and when his mother remarried, her new husband, Solomon Levick did not want her children in the house. As a result, the three boys were placed in the Hebrew Orphan Home in Philadelphia when Glazier was 5. Glazier later reported that "[h]er reasoning and the pain it brought us remains incomprehensible, unfathomable." Glazier ran away from the orphanage after being sexually abused by a volunteer, but returned as he could find nowhere else to go. He later sought psychoanalysis to help him deal with these childhood experiences. Glazier left the home at the age of 15, working as an usher at the Bijou burlesque theater that showed films between acts. He recalled "I instantly realized that films would always be the loveliest and best escape from the troubled life I inherited". He also worked as a part-time pimp for a local madam.

Glazier was managing the Mayfair Theater in Dayton, Ohio, when shortly before the United States entered the Second World War, he enlisted in the Army Air Corps. The newly married Glazier served in Australia and New Guinea as a second lieutenant, commanding 100 black troops as a support unit of the 380th Bombardment Group.

== New York and film production ==
After his discharge and divorce, Glazier moved to Manhattan, where he was appointed the night manager of the Apollo Bar and worked with jazz artists such as Duke Ellington and Billie Holiday. He found a day job under the GI Bill as an apprentice jeweller, but left the position seeking to become a bonds salesman for the new state of Israel. His success in fund-raising led him to be appointed as the executive director of the Eleanor Roosevelt Cancer Foundation. He greatly admired Eleanor Roosevelt as a person and activist and the two later became friends. When she died in 1962, he initiated the production of the documentary on her life. The film, The Eleanor Roosevelt Story, which Glazier produced, was groundbreaking in style and won the 1965 Academy Award for Best Documentary Feature. In 1964, he married Yungmei Tang who had worked as a production assistant on the film. The couple had a daughter, Karen, in 1965.

== The Producers ==
TV writer and fledgling film writer and director Mel Brooks pitched his project Springtime for Hitler to Glazier. Brooks had previously made numerous unsuccessful attempts to interest movie producers. Over lunch in Glazier's office, Brooks acted out all the parts and began singing Springtime for Hitler. Glazier reported that he had never laughed so hard in his life. "He spit out his coffee and tuna sandwich and couldn't stop laughing," recalled Brooks. "He said 'I vow to get this movie made. The world must see this picture.'" Glazier struggled at first to interest movie studios in the show business satire, but with perseverance Joseph E. Levine at Avco Embassy accepted the project and agreed to let Brooks direct the movie. Filming was not without its challenges. Brooks was an anxious, perfectionist and difficult novice director, who had problems communicating with the actors. Zero Mostel was also often angry and demanding, and Glazier had to mediate between the director, Mostel and others. Despite frequent requests from Brooks for extra money and resources, Glazier succeeded in bringing the film in under budget. Brooks remembered Glazier as a producer was "very bright, warm and a bit of a bon vivant. Sidney was the first one to say, 'The dailies look good, let's have a party.' He'd have a party about anything – have a few drinks, canapés and pretty girls. He was right out of a black-and-white Fred Astaire and Ginger Rogers movie." The film, renamed The Producers at the insistence of Levine, had a mixed reception. Many critics gave it poor reviews, but the actor and comedian Peter Sellers was so enthralled that he took out ads in various trade papers praising the film as "the essence of all great comedy combined in a single motion picture." The film was to become a cult classic, and in 1996 was entered into the National Film Registry as a "culturally, historically and aesthetically significant film." In his 2001 Tony Award acceptance speech for the Broadway adaptation of the film, Brooks credited Glazier as the "man who made it happen." He recalled "None of it – all of this wonderful, magical stuff – would be, if it wasn't for the faith and courage of this terrific guy."

== Later career ==
Glazier formed a distribution company, Universal Marion Corporation Pictures, and acted as executive producer on films, such as Woody Allen's Take the Money and Run (1969), Waris Hussein's Quackser Fortune Has a Cousin in the Bronx (1970), Mel Brooks's Twelve Chairs (1970), and Glen and Randa (1971). The company managed the US distribution of Luis Buñuel's Milky Way (1969) and the Dario Argento film The Bird with the Crystal Plumage (1970).

In 1973 Glazier produced the television drama Catholics (1973). The production, adapted from a Brian Moore novel about the Roman Catholic Church after Vatican II, won a Peabody Award.

Brooks asked Glazier to go to Hollywood to work on further films, but with his marriage breaking up he demurred, preferring to remain in New York to be close to his daughter. He continued a savvy business career—for example he invested in the doctor who discovered Viagra—and maintained generous friendships with many, in which he disliked being the center of attention.

Glazier died at the age of 86 of natural causes at a nursing home in Bennington, Vermont. "Most movie executives and producers," said Brooks, "are usually boring and dull, and not well-read. They don't care about art or painting, they just care about profits. But Sidney was always an artist. You could talk about anything with him - great literature, life and love." The writer and critic Michael Coveney knew Glazier as “demanding [...], irascible, impatient but full of charm", someone who "epitomised [New York]'s spirit of tolerance, intellectual curiosity, fast living and taste for the high life".
