= Roger Bart =

American actor (born 1962)

- Born: September 29, 1962 (age 64); Norwalk, Connecticut, U.S.
- Education: Rutgers University, New Brunswick (BFA)
- Occupation: Actor
- Years active: 1987–present

External image
- Bart at an event for The Lost Room in 2006

Roger Bart (born September 29, 1962) is an American actor. He won a Tony Award and a Drama Desk Award for his performance as Snoopy in the 1999 revival of You're a Good Man, Charlie Brown.

Bart received his second Tony Award nomination for playing Carmen Ghia in the original production of The Producers and his third for his performance as "Doc" Brown in Back to the Future: The Musical. His other accolades include a SAG Award and three Outer Critics Circle Award nominations. In 2007, he began a three-year stint as Frederick Frankenstein in the Broadway and touring production of Young Frankenstein.

Bart performed the song "Go the Distance" from the 1997 animated film Hercules, which was nominated for an Oscar and a Golden Globe.

== Early life and education ==
Bart was born in Norwalk, Connecticut, the son of a teacher and a chemical engineer, and grew up in Bernardsville, New Jersey. His uncle is journalist Peter Bart. He graduated from Bernards High School in 1980 and was later inducted into the school's hall of fame.

He earned his BFA in Acting from Mason Gross School of the Arts at Rutgers, the State University of New Jersey in 1985.

Bart was close friends with Jonathan Larson: both worked as waiters between theater jobs and frequently hung out at each other's workplaces. He participated in early presentations of Larson's work including Tick, Tick... Boom! and Rent; the main character "Roger" from Rent is named after him.

== Career ==
He made his Broadway debut in Big River as Tom Sawyer in 1985. Additional theatre credits include Jonathan in the Alan Menken/Tim Rice musical King David, Harlequin in Triumph of Love, Snoopy in the Broadway revival of You're a Good Man, Charlie Brown (for which he won the Drama Desk Award and a Tony), Carmen Ghia and later Leo Bloom in The Producers (earning Drama Desk and Tony nominations), and The Frogs at Lincoln Center, which reunited him with fellow Producers star Nathan Lane and Susan Stroman.

In 1996 and 1997, Bart appeared as Bud Frump in the USA national tour of How to Succeed in Business Without Really Trying.

On television, Bart played George Carlin's son on The George Carlin Show (1994), and on Bram & Alice (2002) he portrayed Bram's assistant, Paul Newman. He became widely known to viewers with his portrayal of George Williams, the unhinged homicidal pharmacist in love with Bree Van de Kamp (Marcia Cross), on Desperate Housewives, which earned him a SAG Award.

Bart provided the singing voice for teenage Hercules in Disney's Hercules, as well as the singing voice of Scamp in Lady and the Tramp II: Scamp's Adventure. He was featured in the 2004 remake of The Stepford Wives with Nicole Kidman, Matthew Broderick, Bette Midler, Christopher Walken and Glenn Close, and in The Producers (2005), in which he reprised his role of "common-law assistant" Carmen Ghia.

In December 2006, Bart played Howard "The Weasel" Montague in the Sci Fi Channel miniseries The Lost Room. In 2007, he starred as Stuart in Hostel: Part II, the sequel to 2005's Hostel, and had supporting roles in American Gangster and Spy School. In 2008, he appeared in Harold & Kumar Escape from Guantanamo Bay, the sequel to 2004's Harold & Kumar Go to White Castle, and The Midnight Meat Train.

Bart also originated the lead role of Dr. Frederick Frankenstein in the musical adaptation of Mel Brooks' Young Frankenstein, which opened on Broadway in November 2007, following a run in Seattle. He reprised the role alongside former Broadway co-stars Shuler Hensley and Cory English in the United States national tour that launched in September 2009. He ended his run on August 8, 2010, and was succeeded by Christopher Ryan. Bart originally portrayed the role of Igor in the original workshop read-through.

Brad Oscar and Bart reprised their roles as Max Bialystock and Leo Bloom, respectively, in a production of The Producers at Starlight Theatre in Kansas City, Missouri. The show ran from August 23–29, 2010.

In 2011, Bart was cast in the recurring role of Mason Treadwell on the ABC drama series Revenge.

In 2013, Bart was cast in the recurring role of Roger Riskin on the Showtime drama series Episodes.

Bart was originally set to play the dual role of Charles Frohman and Captain James Hook in the 2014 A.R.T. pre-Broadway production of Finding Neverland. He was ultimately replaced by Michael McGrath.

In 2016, Bart returned to Broadway in the musical Disaster!

In 2017, Bart was cast in the recurring role of Vice Principal Nero on the second season of the Netflix comedy-drama series A Series of Unfortunate Events.

In 2018, Bart was cast in the main role of Judge Wilson on the Freeform drama series Good Trouble, the spin-off of The Fosters.

In 2019, Bart was cast as Hades in the world premiere of Disney's musical, Hercules. That same year, he was announced to play Dr. Emmett Brown in the musical adaptation of Back to the Future. After playing the role at the Manchester Opera House and West End's Adelphi Theatre, he reprised the part in the Broadway production.

In 2021, Bart cameoed in the film adaptation of Tick, Tick... Boom!, 30 years after performing in the original show with Jonathan Larson. A character in the film played by Joshua Henry is named "Roger" after him, and is loosely inspired by Bart.

== Filmography ==
=== Film ===
Year	Title	Role	Notes
1997	Hercules	Young Hercules (singing voice)	
1999	The Insider	Seelbach Hotel Manager	
2001	Lady and the Tramp II: Scamp's Adventure	Scamp (singing voice)	Direct-to-video
2004	The Stepford Wives	Roger Bannister	Remake of the 1975 film
2005	The Producers	Carmen Ghia	Based on the 2001 musical
2006	I Want Someone to Eat Cheese With	Burl Canasta	
2007	Hostel: Part II	Stuart	
2007	American Gangster	U.S. Attorney	
2008	Spy School	Principal Hampton	
2008	Harold & Kumar Escape from Guantanamo Bay	Dr. Beecher	
2008	The Midnight Meat Train	Jurgis	
2009	Law Abiding Citizen	Brian Bringham	
2011	One Night Stand	Himself	
2012	Excision	Bob	
2012	Freaky Deaky	Jerry Baker	
2012	A Green Story	Johnson	
2012	Smiley	Professor Clayton	
2012	The Last Man	Will	Short film
2013	April Apocalypse	Jack	
2013	Last Vegas	Maurice Tischler	
2015	Molly	Brad	Short film
2015	Trumbo	Buddy Ross	
2016	Internet Famous	Chris!	
2017	Speech & Debate	Principal Bellingham	
2018	Ghost Light	Henry Asquith	
2019	Bayou Tales	Adam	
2021	Tick, Tick... Boom!	Featured Diner	
2026	Office Romance	William Butten	
2026	The Man with the Bag		Post-production
TBA	Broadway: The Next Generation	Himself	Documentary; Post-production

=== Television ===
Year	Title	Role	Notes
1994	The George Carlin Show	Ron Blessington	Episode: "George Gets a Big Surprise"
2000	Law & Order	Alec Hughes	Episode: "Surrender Dorothy"
2000	Law & Order: Special Victims Unit	Benjy Dowe	Episode: "Closure"
2002	Bram & Alice	Paul	Recurring role (8 episodes)
2005	Out of Practice	Lou Pimsky	Episode: "Losing Patients"
2005	International Digital Emmy Awards	Himself (host)	Television special
2005–2006, 2007, 2012	Desperate Housewives	George Williams	16 episodes (recurring season 1, also starring season 2 episodes 2–9, special guest star season 2 episode 24, uncredited season 8)
2006	The Lost Room	Howard 'The Weasel' Montague	Television miniseries (2 episodes)
2006	My Ex Life	Unknown role	Television movie
2009	30 Rock	Brad Halster	Episode: "Cutbacks"
2010	CSI: Miami	Bob Starling	2 episodes
2010	Human Target	John Doe	Episode: "Dead Head"
2011	Medium	Dennis Caruso	Episode: "Me Without You"
2011	Traffic Light	Marty	Episode: "Pilot"
2011	The Event	Richard Peel	Recurring role (10 episodes)
2011	The Life & Times of Tim	Mayor (voice)	Episode: "Percey Davis/Boulevard/Cool Uncle Stu Balls"
2012	CSI: Crime Scene Investigation	Jeffrey Fitzgerald	Episode: "Tressed to Kill"
2012	Hot in Cleveland	Jimmy	Episode: "Claus, Tails & High-Pitched Males: Birthdates 3"
2012	Hot in Cleveland	Himself (uncredited)	Episode: "Some Like it Hot"
2012	Grimm	Constantine Brinkerhof	Episode: "Big Feet"
2012	Perception	IRS Agent Ethan Kendrick	Episode: "Messenger"
2012	Political Animals	Barry Harris	Television miniseries; Recurring role (6 episodes)
2012	Law & Order: Special Victims Unit	Adam Cain	Episode: "Twenty-Five Acts"
2012	Easy to Assemble	Howard Friske	Recurring role (9 episodes)
2012–2015	Revenge	Mason Treadwell	Recurring role (11 episodes)
2013	It's Always Sunny in Philadelphia	Rep	Episode: "The Gang Tries Desperately to Win an Award"
2013–2014	How I Met Your Mother	Curtis	Recurring role (5 episodes)
2014	Jessie	Mr. Phil McNichol	Episode: "Krumping and Crushing"
2014	The Exes	Sam	Episode: "When Haskell Met Sammy"
2014	How to Build a Better Boy	Dr. James Hartley	Television movie
2014	Celebrity Ghost Stories	Himself	Episode: "Julie White/Roger Bart/Dominique Swain/Thomas Ian Nicholas"
2014–2017	Episodes	Roger Riskin	Recurring role (11 episodes)
2015	Modern Family	Anders	Episode: "Valentine's Day 4: Twisted Sister"
2015	Sex & Drugs & Rock & Roll	Jeremy	Episode: "Supercalifragilisticjuliefriggingandrews"
2015	Scream Queens	Dr. Herfmann	Episode: "Chainsaw"
2015	You're the Worst	Jonathan R. Strasburg	Episode: "All About That Paper"
2015	4th International Academy of Web Television Awards	Himself (host)	Television special
2016	Doc McStuffins	Ferris (voice)	Episode: "Blast Off to the Unknown!/Bust a Move"
2016	Code Black	Hank Goldman	Episode: "What Lies Beneath"
2016–2017	No Tomorrow	Cory Casey	2 episodes
2016–2017	Graves	Lawrence Mills	Recurring role (11 episodes)
2017	Grace and Frankie	Steve Clarrington	Recurring role (3 episodes)
2017	There's... Johnny!	Angelo	Recurring role (5 episodes)
2018–2019	A Series of Unfortunate Events	Vice Principal Nero Feint	4 episodes
2018	Quantico	Fedowitz	Episode: "Bullet Train"
2018	Elementary	Kip Lowell	Episode: "You've Come a Long Way, Baby"
2019–2021	Good Trouble	Judge Wilson	Series regular (19 episodes)
2019	The Good Fight	Brad Cayman	Episode: "The One Where Kurt Saves Diane"
2021	The Blacklist	Scooter Rovenpor	2 episodes

=== Theatre ===
Year	Title	Role	Venue	Notes
1985–1987	Big River	Tom Sawyer (replacement)	Eugene O'Neill Theatre	
1988-1991	Superbia	Josh	Village Gate (1988); The Public Theater (1991)	Workshop
1990-1993	Tick, Tick... Boom!	Backup singer (Role later named Michael)	Second Stage Theater (1990); Village Gate (1991); New York Theatre Workshop (1992 & 1993)	Workshop
1991	Sweeney Todd: The Demon Barber of Fleet Street	Tobias Ragg	New Israeli Opera	
1992–1993	The Secret Garden	Dickon	Touring production	
1993–1995	The Who's Tommy	Cousin Kevin	Touring production	
1996–1997	How to Succeed in Business Without Really Trying	Bud Frump	Touring production	
1997	King David	Jonathan	New Amsterdam Theatre	
1997–1998	Triumph of Love	Harlequin, the valet	Royale Theatre	
1999	You're a Good Man, Charlie Brown	Snoopy	Ambassador Theatre	
2001	The Producers	Carmen Ghia	Cadillac Palace Theatre	
2001–2002	The Producers	Carmen Ghia	St. James Theatre	Broadway
2002–2003	The Producers	Leo Bloom	St. James Theatre	Broadway
2003–2004	The Producers	Carmen Ghia	St. James Theatre	Broadway
2004	The Frogs	Xanthias	Vivian Beaumont Theater	Broadway
2005	The Producers	Leo Bloom	St. James Theatre	Broadway
2006	The Producers	Leo Bloom	St. James Theatre	Broadway
2006	Young Frankenstein	Igor	Unknown	Workshop
2006–2007	The Producers	Leo Bloom	St. James Theatre	Broadway
2007	Young Frankenstein	Frederick Frankenstein	Paramount Theatre	Seattle, Washington (pre-Broadway try-out)
2007-2009	Young Frankenstein	Frederick Frankenstein	Hilton Theatre	Broadway
2010	Young Frankenstein	Frederick Frankenstein	Various	First National Tour
2012	The Producers	Carmen Ghia	Hollywood Bowl	
2016	Disaster!	Tony	Nederlander Theatre	Broadway
2018	Annie	Rooster Hannigan	Hollywood Bowl	
2019	Hercules	Hades	Delacorte Theatre	
2020	Back to the Future: The Musical	Dr. Emmett Brown	Manchester Opera House	
2021–2023	Back to the Future: The Musical	Dr. Emmett Brown	Adelphi Theatre	West End
2023–2025	Back to the Future: The Musical	Dr. Emmett Brown	Winter Garden Theatre	Broadway
2025–2026	Back to the Future: The Musical	Dr. Emmett Brown	Sydney Lyric Theatre	Australia
2026-2027	Back to the Future: The Musical	Dr. Emmett Brown	UK Tour	

== Awards and nominations ==
Association	Year	Category	Nominated work	Result
Broadway.com Audience Awards	2024	Favorite Featured Actor in a Musical	Back to the Future: The Musical	Nominated
Broadway.com Audience Awards	2024	Favorite Funny Performance	Back to the Future: The Musical	Nominated
Broadway.com Audience Awards	2024	Favorite Onstage Pair (with Casey Likes)	Back to the Future: The Musical	Nominated
Drama Desk Awards	1999	Outstanding Featured Actor in a Musical	You're a Good Man, Charlie Brown	Won
Drama Desk Awards	2001	Outstanding Featured Actor in a Musical	The Producers	Nominated
DVD Exclusive Awards	2001	Best Original Song for "A World Without Fences"	Lady and the Tramp 2: Scamp's Adventure	Nominated
Online Film & Television Association Awards	1998	Best Music, Original Song for "Go the Distance"	Hercules	Nominated
Screen Actors Guild Awards	2006	Outstanding Performance by an Ensemble in a Comedy Series	Desperate Housewives	Won
Tony Awards	1999	Best Featured Actor in a Musical	You're a Good Man, Charlie Brown	Won
Tony Awards	2001	Best Featured Actor in a Musical	The Producers	Nominated
Tony Awards	2024	Best Featured Actor in a Musical	Back to the Future: The Musical	Nominated
