= Springtime for Hitler (song) =

1967 song by Mel Brooks

Song

from the album Music and Dialogue from Mel Brooks' "The Producers"
- Released: 1967
- Composer: Mel Brooks
- Lyricist: Mel Brooks

"Springtime for Hitler" is a song written and composed by Mel Brooks for his 1967 film The Producers.

In the original film, the 2001 musical, and 2005 film adaptation, the song is the overture to a stage musical titled Springtime for Hitler, an admiring tribute to Adolf Hitler written by unstable former Nazi soldier Franz Liebkind, which protagonists Max Bialystock and Leo Bloom produce on Broadway in hopes that the production will fail, allowing them to secretly embezzle the rest of the money they had earned via selling an excess of shares. It was orchestrated by Philip J. Lang and staged by Alan Johnson for the former, with the latter productions orchestrated by Doug Besterman and staged by director Susan Stroman.

== Comparison between 1967 film, 2001 musical, and 2005 film ==
In the 1967 film, 2001 stage musical, and 2005 film, the Bavarian interlude, Ziegfeld menagerie, and Busby Berkeley–styled swastika formation remain largely unchanged.

The first major difference between the 1967 film and the stage musical and 2005 film concerned the character who played the part of Adolf Hitler and the circumstances of Springtime for Hitler's surprise success. In the 1967 film, by the time the song was over, the audience was ready to leave the theatre in disgust and horror, with Max and Leo, ecstatic their plan worked, retreating to a bar. But as the scene changes to reveal hippie actor Lorenzo St. Dubois aka 'L.S.D.' (played by Dick Shawn) as Adolf Hitler, his wild improvisations prove to be an instant hit, leaving them in hysterical fits of laughter.

In the musical and 2005 film, the character L.S.D. was omitted and the plot was changed to have the character Roger De Bris, the show's director, play Adolf Hitler after the original actor, the playwright Franz Liebkind, "broke (his) leg". The character Ulla is now part of the cast as Marlene Dietrich and a Black Eagle, and Roger appears immediately after the dance break. He then sings a new section called "Heil Myself", followed by a reprise of the Bavarian interlude done in the style of Judy Garland. Most productions would follow this with a monologue of Hitler's rise to power. In others, it is followed by a satirical "Challenge Tap" dance with the Allied Leaders.

In the musical, "Springtime for Hitler" is directly presented to the musical audience, with the positive reception confirmed in the following scene in Max and Leo's office. In the 2005 film, the audience is shown preparing to leave in disgust (similar to the 1967 film), but returns to their seats laughing after Roger's flamboyant Adolf Hitler appears.

== Track listing ==
7" single High Anxiety by Mel Brooks — 1978, Asylum Records E-45458, United States and Canada

Side 1. "High Anxiety" (2:30)
Side 2. "Springtime For Hitler" (3:22)

== Accolades ==
The song (in the original version from the 1967 film The Producers) was ranked 80th on the list of the "100 greatest songs in American cinema" released by the American Film Institute (AFI) in 2004.
