= Springtime for Hitler =

Fictional musical in the 1967 film The Producers

Springtime for Hitler: A Gay Romp with Adolf and Eva at Berchtesgaden is a fictional musical play within a play in Mel Brooks' 1967 film The Producers, as well as the stage musical adaptation of the movie and the 2005 movie adaptation of the musical. It is a musical about Adolf Hitler, written by Franz Liebkind, an unbalanced former Nazi soldier originally played by Kenneth Mars (and later by Brad Oscar and Will Ferrell in the stage musical and the 2005 film, respectively). According to Dick Cavett, the title was inspired by the 1931 play Springtime for Henry.

In the original film, the play is chosen by the producer Max Bialystock and his accountant Leo Bloom in their fraudulent scheme to raise substantial funding by selling 25,000% of a play, then causing it to fail, and finally keeping all of the remaining money for themselves. To ensure that the play is a total failure, Max selects the script for Springtime for Hitler, described as a genuine "love letter" to Adolf Hitler, and hires the worst director he can find: Roger DeBris, a stereotypical homosexual and transvestite caricature. He casts an out-of-control hippie named Lorenzo St. Dubois, also known by his initials "L.S.D.", in the role of Hitler after he had wandered into the wrong theater by mistake during the casting call.

== Original film scene ==
The play starts with the overture "Springtime for Hitler", featuring dancing stormtroopers, who at one point form a Busby Berkeley–style swastika. The play immediately horrifies everyone in the audience except the author, and one lone viewer who breaks into applause—only for the latter to get pummeled by other disgusted theatergoers. As the audience begins to storm out of the theater, the first scene starts, with L.S.D. dressed up in full Nazi uniform and talking like a beatnik. The remaining audience starts to laugh, thinking that it is a satire, and those that had left return to the theater.

Franz, disgusted, goes behind the stage, unties the cable holding up the curtain and rushes out on stage, confronting the audience and ranting about the treatment of his beloved play. During his diatribe, there is a clank as someone strikes through the curtain, apparently with a pipe or hammer, hitting the steel Wehrmacht helmet that he is wearing, knocking him unconscious. The play continues, and the audience assumes that his performance was part of the act.

The play gets rave reviews from critics, ensuring its success, as well as the conviction of the producers once the fraudulent financing is discovered.

== Differences between versions ==
In the musical stage version of The Producers and the 2005 musical film based on it, the part of L.S.D. is not included and Hitler is played by DeBris, who sings a solo, "Heil Myself".. Author Liebkind is originally chosen by Max to play Hitler but, due to an unfortunate accident, he breaks his leg (ironic as the term "break a leg" is used to mean "good luck" in the theater world) and Max then asks DeBris to play Hitler. The swastika choreography at the end is displayed to the audience via a large mirror that is raised, à la A Chorus Line. In the climactic final chorus, the 2005 film orchestration quotes the climax of the invasion theme from the first movement of Dimitri Shostakovich's seventh symphony "Leningrad", depicting the 1941 German invasion of the Soviet Union.

In the musical version, Franz does not interrupt the play, but waits until after the performance to confront the producers, and then attempts to kill them under the accusation of breaking the Siegfried Oath by making a fool out of Hitler ("He didn't need our help!"). He breaks his other leg while trying to run away from the police.
