= Brad Oscar =

American actor (born 1964)

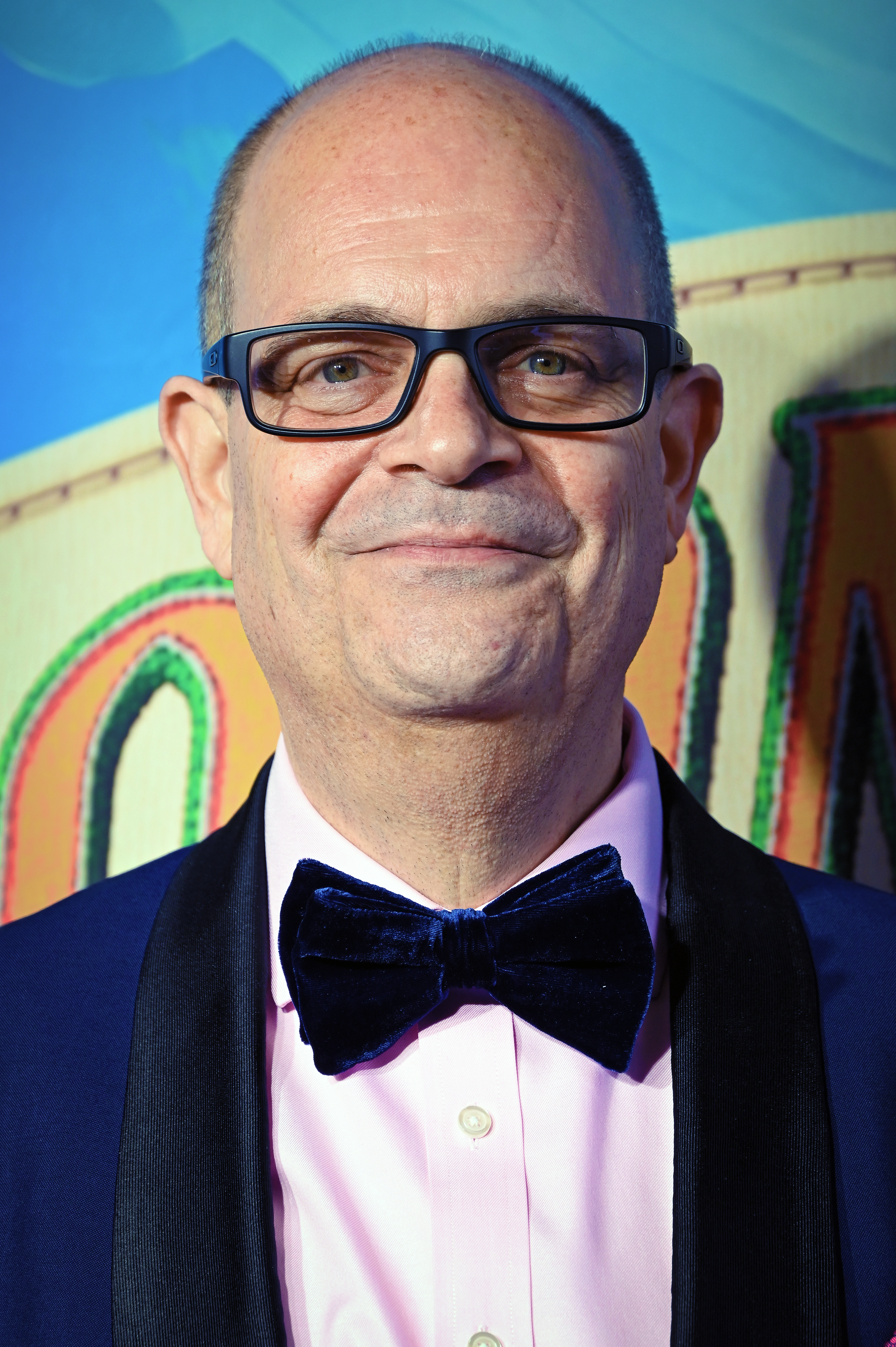
- Oscar in 2026
- Born: September 22, 1964 (age 61); Washington, D.C., U.S.
- Education: Boston University
- Occupation: Actor
- Years active: 1990–present
- Spouse: Diego Prieto (m. 2012)

Brad Oscar (born September 22, 1964) is an American musical theatre actor, known for his Broadway performances in musicals such as The Producers, Something Rotten!, Big Fish, Spamalot, The Addams Family, Mrs. Doubtfire, Wicked, and Schmigadoon!.

He has earned two Tony Award nominations: one for The Producers as Franz Liebkind, and one for Something Rotten! as Thomas Nostradamus. He starred in the Off-Broadway revival of Sweeney Todd: The Demon Barber of Fleet Street in 2017 as Beadle Bamford and as Mr. Mushnik in the Off-Broadway revival of Little Shop of Horrors from 2022 to 2024.

== Career ==
Oscar graduated with a BFA from the Boston University College of Fine Arts in 1986 and was awarded a Distinguished Alumni Award in 2006.

Oscar's Broadway debut was in the 1990 musical Aspects of Love as a swing. His next roles were in Jekyll and Hyde, as Sir Peter, Archibald Proops, Barrow Boy, and Second Gentleman in both the 1995 tour and the 1997 Broadway show.

His performance, however, in The Producers garnered him the most acclaim. Oscar started out as Franz Liebkind, and was also understudy for Max Bialystock (one of the lead roles) and Roger De Bris. The role of Franz earned Oscar a Tony nomination for Best Featured Actor in a Musical, but lost to his co-star Gary Beach. After this success, he replaced Nathan Lane as Bialystock. In 2007, he originated the Bialystock role in the Las Vegas production at the Paris Hotel and Casino.

He has appeared in several productions at the Arena Stage in Washington, D.C. In 2005 he played "The Devil" (Mr. Applegate) in Damn Yankees, and in October 2006 he played "The Master of Ceremonies" in Cabaret. He played multiple roles, including "Lady Enid", in The Mystery of Irma Vep from June 2008 through July 13, 2008.

Oscar's other regional work includes the title role in the musical Barnum, at the Asolo Repertory Theatre (Florida), from November 12 through December 20, 2008. In recent years, Brad and his sister, Victoria Oscar, have served as the official Santa and Mrs. Claus for the annual National Christmas Tree Lighting Program.

Oscar took over the role of "Uncle Fester" (from Kevin Chamberlin) in The Addams Family on Broadway starting March 8, 2011.

He originated the role of Thomas Nostradamus in the musical Something Rotten!, which opened on Broadway in April 2015, for which he earned a 2015 Tony Award nomination for Best Performance by an Actor in a Featured Role in a Musical, which went to his co-star Christian Borle. He stayed with the production until its closing in January 2017.

He played the role of Beadle Bamford in the Tooting Arts Club production of Sweeney Todd at the Off-Broadway Barrow Street Theatre.

== Personal life ==
Oscar and Diego Prieto, an actor, were married on April 16, 2012, in a ceremony at the Arena Stage, where they met during the 2005 production of Damn Yankees, with Molly Smith officiating.

== Credits ==
=== Theatre ===
Year	Show	Role	Notes
1985	Merrily We Roll Along	Joseph Josephson	Keene Summer Theatre
1990	Aspects of Love	Swing	Broadway; April 8, 1990 – March 2, 1991
1992	Forbidden Broadway	Performer	Off-Broadway
1993	Forbidden Broadway	Performer	Off-Broadway
1994	Forbidden Broadway	Performer	Off-Broadway
1997–2001	Jekyll & Hyde	Right Honorable Archibald Proops Second Gentleman; Sir Peter; Barrow Boy Poole (u/s)	Broadway; April 28, 1997 – January 7, 2001
1999	Do Re Mi	M.C. Singer	Encores!
2001	Dreamgirls	Film Executive	Actors Fund Benefit Concert
2001–2002	The Producers	Franz Liebkind Max Bialystock (u/s); Roger De Bris (u/s)	Broadway; April 19, 2001 – April 15, 2002
2002	Funny Girl	Paul	Actors Fund Benefit Concert
2002–2003	The Producers	Max Bialystock	Broadway; April 16, 2002 – April 27, 2003
2003	The Producers	Max Bialystock	National Tour; Jun 17 – November 23, 2003
2003–2004	The Producers	Max Bialystock (s/b)	Broadway; December 30, 2003 – April 4, 2004
2004	The Producers	Max Bialystock	Broadway; April 6, 2004 – December 12, 2004
2005	The Producers	Max Bialystock	West End; Jan 10 – April 23, 2005
2005	The Producers	Max Bialystock	Broadway; Jul 5 – October 31, 2005
2005	On the Twentieth Century	Oliver Webb	Actors Fund Benefit Concert
2005	Damn Yankees	Mr. Applegate	Arena Stage
2006	Cabaret	The Emcee	Arena Stage; Oct. 2006
2007	The Producers	Max Bialystock	Las Vegas; Paris Casino
2007–2009	Spamalot	Sir Bedevere; Concorde; Dennis' Mother	Broadway; December 18, 2007 – January 11, 2009
2008	The Mystery of Irma Vep	Lady Enid	Arena Stage; June/July 2008
2008	Barnum	P. T. Barnum	Asolo Repertory Theatre; Nov 12 – December 20, 2008
2009–2010	Young Frankenstein	Inspector Kemp Blind Hermit	National Tour
2010	The Producers	Max Bialystock	Kansas City Starlight Theatre
2011	The Addams Family	Uncle Fester Addams	Broadway; Mar 7 – December 31, 2011
2012	Fiddler on the Roof	Tevye	Barrington Stage Company
2013	Nice Work If You Can Get It	Cookie McGee	Broadway; Jan 8 – March 3, 2013
2013	She Loves Me	Ladislav Sipos	Caramoor Center for Music and the Arts; June 2013
2013	Big Fish	Amos Calloway	Pre-Broadway
2013	Big Fish	Amos Calloway	Broadway; Oct 6 – December 29, 2013
2014	The Phantom of the Opera	Monsieur Richard Firmin	National Tour; Apr 7 - November, 2014
2015	Annie Get Your Gun	Charlie Davenport	Encores!
2015–2017	Something Rotten!	Thomas Nostradamus	Broadway; April 22, 2015 – January 1, 2017
2017	Sweeney Todd: The Demon Barber of Fleet Street	Beadle Bamford	Barrow Street Theatre; March 4, 2017 – August 27, 2017
2019	Mrs. Doubtfire	Frank Hillard	5th Avenue Theatre
2020	Mrs. Doubtfire	Frank Hillard	Broadway; Apr. 2020, October 21, 2021 – May 29, 2022
2021–2022	Mrs. Doubtfire	Frank Hillard	Broadway; Apr. 2020, October 21, 2021 – May 29, 2022
2022–2023	Little Shop of Horrors	Mr. Mushnik	Off-Broadway; September 27, 2022 – April 30, 2023
2023	Oliver!	Mr. Bumble	Encores! May 3–14, 2023
2023–2024	Little Shop of Horrors	Mr. Mushnik	Off-Broadway; May 16, 2023 – January 14, 2024
2024–2025	Wicked	The Wonderful Wizard of Oz	Broadway; March 5, 2024 – January 26, 2025
2024	Sinatra: The Musical	George Evans	Apollo Theatre; November 21, 2024
2025	Schmigadoon!	Mayor Aloysius Menlove	Kennedy Center; January 31 – February 9, 2025
2025	Wicked	The Wonderful Wizard of Oz	Broadway; February 11 – August 22, 2025
2025	Wicked	The Wonderful Wizard of Oz	Broadway; September 2, 2025 – March 1, 2026
2026	Schmigadoon!	Mayor Aloysius Menlove	Broadway; April 4, 2026 – present

=== Film ===
Year	Title	Role	Notes
2005	The Producers	Cab Driver	
2008	Old Days	Louis	Short film
2008	Ghost Town	Day Doorman	
2014	Russian Broadway Shutdown	Russian IOC Representative	Short film

=== Television ===
Year	Title	Role	Notes
2002	Law & Order	Paul	1 episode
2005	Law & Order: Criminal Intent	Mitch	1 episode
2011	The Good Wife	Eric Atkins	1 episode
2011	Submissions Only	Bill Hobbs	1 episode
2011	Outside the Box	Norman Bates	short
2012	Smash	Peter	1 episode

== Awards and nominations ==
Year	Award	Category	Nominee	Result
2001	Tony Award	Best Featured Actor in a Musical	The Producers	Nominated
2015	Tony Award	Best Featured Actor in a Musical	Something Rotten!	Nominated
2015	Drama Desk Award	Outstanding Featured Actor in a Musical	Something Rotten!	Nominated
