= Sarah Cornell (actress) =

Canadian actress

Sarah Cornell is a Canadian actress and writer who received the 2010 LA Stage Alliance Ovation Award for Best Supporting Actress in a Stage Musical for The Producers She has also appeared in productions of Sex and the Second City Evil Dead: The Musical, and A Little Princess at Prime Stage Theatre among others.

== Filmography ==
=== Film ===
Year	Title	Role	Notes
2014	Look in the Mirror	Betty's Friend	

=== Television ===
Year	Title	Role	Notes
2006	At the Hotel	Irina	5 episodes
2007	The Robber Bride	Ground Attendant	Television film
2007	Comedy Inc.	Various	15 episodes; also staff writer
2009–2011	Producing Parker	Chicago Hyatt	14 episodes
2018	Rachel Dratch's Late Night Snack	Sanjellica Fujimara	3 episodes; also writer
2019	Modern Family	Volunteer #3	Episode: "Perfect Pairs"
2019	Show Offs	Various	3 episodes
2020	Coop & Cami Ask the World	Judy Vanderwiesen	3 episodes
