= Lee Meredith =

American actress

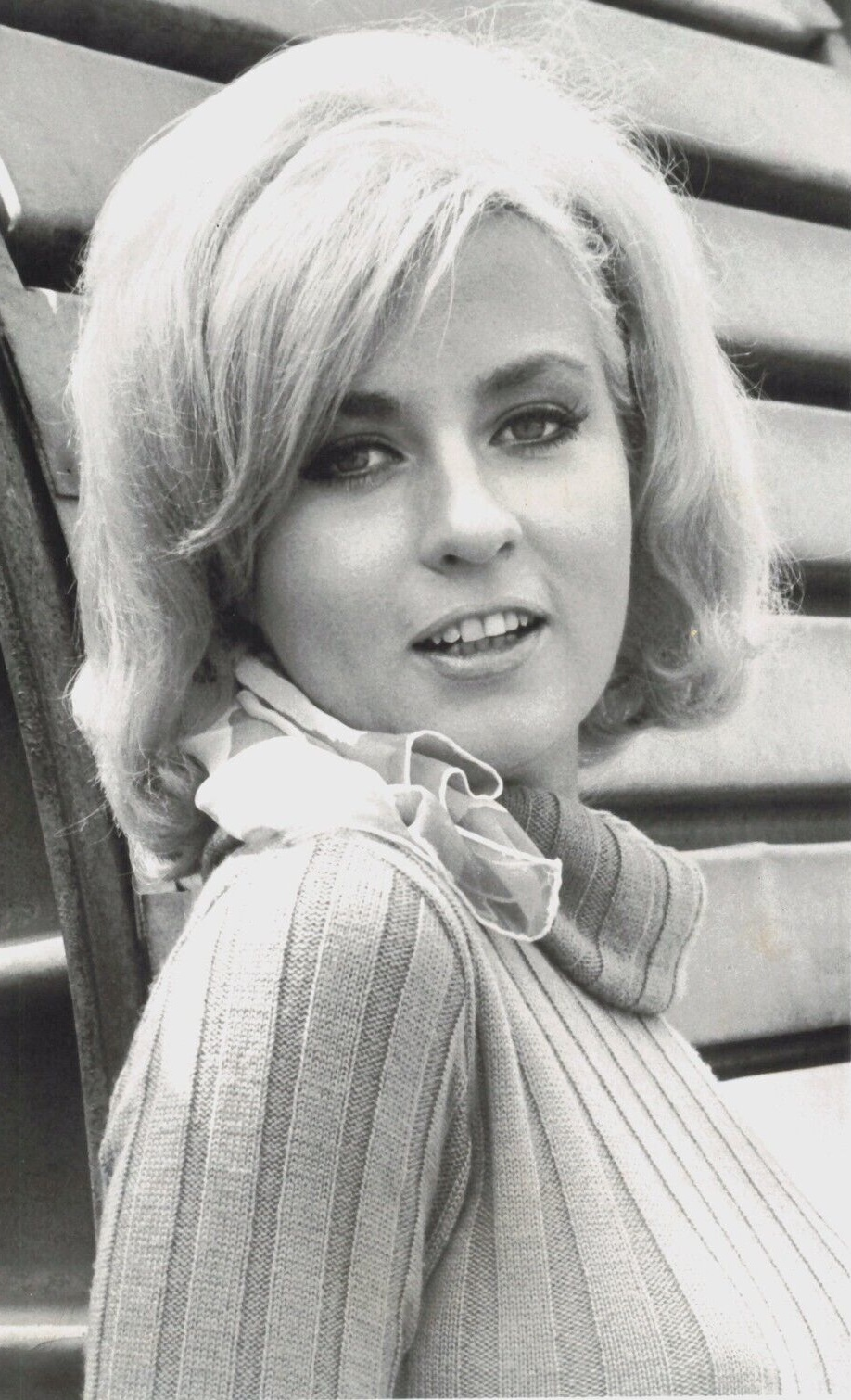
- Born: Judith Lee Sauls; October 22, 1947 (age 78); River Edge, New Jersey, U.S.
- Occupation: Actress

Lee Meredith (born Judith Lee Sauls, October 22, 1947) is an American actress.

== Biography ==
On October 22, 1947, Meredith was born Judith Lee Sauls in River Edge, New Jersey, and grew up in Fair Lawn, New Jersey. When she was 15, she joined the Manhattan Rockets precision dance team. Following her high-school graduation, she became a model and studied at the American Academy of Dramatic Arts. She is married to film producer Bert Stratford.

Meredith is best-known for the role of the Swedish secretary Ulla in the original 1967 version of The Producers. In 2002, she appeared on the 35th-anniversary DVD edition of The Producers, where she gives an interview and recreates her dance from the original film.

In 1972, she appeared as a nurse in a sketch in the original Broadway production of The Sunshine Boys and repeated her performance in the 1975 film version with Walter Matthau and George Burns. In 1973, Meredith appeared as Reginald Van Gleason's object of desire in the first Jackie Gleason comeback special, broadcast on CBS. In 1975, she appeared on one week of Match Game 75 episodes.

In the 1980s, Meredith appeared with writer Mickey Spillane in a series of commercials for Miller Lite beer.

== Credits ==
Year	Title	Role	Notes
1967	The Producers	Ulla	
1968	Funny Girl	Ziegfeld Girl	Uncredited
1969	Hello Down There	Dr. Wells	Filmed in 1967
1970	Cauliflower Cupids	Dee Body	
1971	Welcome to the Club	Betsy Wholecloth	
1972	Hail	Mrs. Maloney	
1972	The Stoolie	Suntan Oil Girl	
1974	Great Performances	Miss Rixey	Episode: "June Moon"
1975	The Sunshine Boys	Nurse in Sketch	
1975	Match Game 75	self	
1983	Murder Me, Murder You	Marty	TV movie
1991	Benny Hill's World: New York	Various roles	TV special
