= Andreas Voutsinas =

Greek actor and theatre director (1930–2010)

- Born: 22 August 1930; Khartoum, Anglo-Egyptian Sudan
- Died: 8 June 2010 (aged 79); Athens, Greece
- Occupations: Actor, theatre director

Andreas Voutsinas (Greek: Ανδρέας Βουτσινάς; 22 August 1930 – 8 June 2010) was a Greek actor and theatre director. In the English-speaking world, he was best known for his roles in three Mel Brooks films, The Producers (1967), The Twelve Chairs (1970) and History of the World, Part I (1981).

== Life and career ==
Voutsinas was born on 22 August 1930 in Khartoum, since there was a sizeable community of Greek settlers in Sudan at the time. His parents came from the island of Cephalonia, Greece. They set up a pasta factory in the Anglo-Egyptian colony, "reputedly supplying spaghetti to Italian forces" during the Fascist invasion of Abyssinia. After the collapse of the business during WWII, Voutsinas moved with his mother to Athens, Greece. His father returned 2 years later.

Voutsinas studied acting and costume design at The Old Vic Τheatre School and drama and song at the Webber Douglas Academy in London, and, in 1957, joined the Actors Studio.

Voutsinas directed more than 130 performances of classical and contemporary repertoire in London, Paris, New York, Canada and Greece. He worked as an actor and director on Broadway and acted in films by Jules Dassin and Luc Besson.

Voutsinas, a life member of The Actors Studio since 1957, spent many years working in summer stock theater and as an assistant to Studio co-founder Elia Kazan, before he met Jane Fonda, with whom he got involved and whom he cast in the leading part in The Fun Couple, his Broadway directorial debut in 1963.

Voutsinas later followed Fonda to Hollywood where he coached her in a number of movies. He then started working as a coach for many others, including Faye Dunaway and Warren Beatty. Following Fonda to Paris to coach her in Roger Vadim's Barbarella, he decided to found Le Theatre Des Cinquante, an acting workshop based on the principles of Lee Strasberg. Many famous French actors and actresses started attending his classes, and at the same time he successfully began directing plays for the French theatre.

In 1967, Voutsinas became the original Carmen Ghia after befriending Mel Brooks's wife, Anne Bancroft. She recommended him to Brooks and said Voutsinas would be perfect for the part. Voutsinas had a role in another Brooks feature, History of the World, Part I, playing the role of "Bernaise" in the French Revolution scenes.

It was not until the early 1980s that he eventually moved to his ancestral Greece, where he continued his career directing a wide range of repertoire from Tennessee Williams to Euripides, mainly for the State Theatre of Northern Greece in Thessaloniki. His productions were also staged during summer in the Athens Festival in Herodion, as well as in the Epidaurus Festival. He continued working between the two countries while he appeared in many French and Greek films, including Le Grand Bleu (1988) and Safe Sex (1999).

Andreas Voutsinas taught acting at the State Theatre of Northern Greece from 2002 to 2009.

After he suffered a stroke he founded his own drama school in Thessaloniki, the Higher Drama School Andreas Voutsinas.

He was married to Artemis Papastrati from 1953 to 1964, they had one son Marios Voutsinas, who became an artist.

== Death ==
Voutsinas died of a respiratory tract infection on 8 June 2010 at age 79, after several days of hospitalization in Henry Dunant Hospital in Athens. His ashes were scattered at the Ancient Theatre of Epidaurus in Greece, as he had wished.

== Filmography ==
=== Movies ===
- The Producers (1967) - Carmen Ghia
- Histoires extraordinaires (1968) - A Courtier (segment "Metzengerstein") (uncredited)
- Fräulein Doktor (1969)
- The Twelve Chairs (1970) - Nikolai Sestrin
- Un peu, beaucoup, passionnément... (1971) - M. Keller
- Boulevard du Rhum (1971) - Alvarez
- Bel ordure (1973) - Poussin, le pianiste
- Lily, aime-moi (1975) - Le barbu de chez Flo / Bearded man at Flo's
- Monsieur Balboss (1975) - Le diplomate
- A Dream of Passion (1978) - Kostas
- Les Charlots contre Dracula (1980) - Le comte Dracula
- History of the World, Part I (1981) - Bearnaise (The French Revolution)
- Les Voleurs de la nuit (1984) - Jose
- Les Nouveaux tricheurs (1987) - Romanoff
- Le Grand bleu (1988) - Priest
- La Petite apocalypse (1993) - Realisateur americain
- Gynaikes dilitirio (1993) - Andreas
- Safe Sex (1999) - Casting Director
- Parta ola (2003)
- Mi fevgeis... (2004) - Voutsinas (final film role)

=== TV ===
- The Defenders (1963) - Raul Martinez
- Le Pain noir (1974) - Le colporteur
- Solitudes (1977) - Casimir
- Sam et Sally (1978) - Le présentateur
- Madame Sourdis (1979, TV Movie) - Vladimir
- Prova nifikou (1995, TV Series) - Orestis Yalinis

=== Stage director ===
- Le Bonheur à Romorantin (1984 TV show)
- Don Juan (1978 TV show)

=== Art director ===
- Mademoiselle Julie (1984 TV show)
