= Producing Parker =

- Genre: Adult animated sitcom
- Created by: Kevin Gillis
- Voices of: Kristin Booth; Kim Cattrall; Peter Keleghan; Aaron Abrams; Sarah Cornell; David Huband; Jamie Watson; Karen LeBlanc; Martin Roach
- Opening theme: "You're a Producer"
- Ending theme: "You're a Producer" (instrumental)
- Countries of origin: Canada; Philippines
- Original language: English
- No. of seasons: 2
- No. of episodes: 26

Production
- Executive producers: Kevin Gillis; Ira Levy; Peter Williamson; Jun Camerino
- Producers: Kevin Gillis; Maria Eliza Tamayo
- Running time: 22 minutes
- Production companies: Mercury Filmworks; Breakthrough Entertainment (Note: As Dee Luded Productions Inc. (season 1) and Dee Luded 2 Productions Inc. (season 2)); Philippine Animation Studio Inc. (credited as Philippine Animators Group Inc.); Canwest; Shaw Media

Original release
- Network: TVtropolis (2009–10); Global (2009); Bite (2010–13)
- Release: May 4, 2009 – July 8, 2011

Producing Parker is an adult animated television sitcom that debuted May 4, 2009 on TVtropolis, and ran for two seasons until July 8, 2011. Episodes began airing on Global in fall 2009.

The series follows Parker Novak and her job as producer of a female-targeted daytime television talk show "The Dee Show" hosted by its self-absorbed and high maintenance Dee. It features the voices of Kristin Booth, Kim Cattrall, Peter Keleghan, Aaron Abrams, Sarah Cornell, David Huband, Jamie Watson, Karen LeBlanc and Martin Roach.

Cattrall was awarded a Gemini for "Best Performance in an Animated Program or Series" in 2010.

== Production ==
The series is co-produced by Breakthrough Animation and Philippine Animators Group Inc. in association with CanWest Global and was confirmed for a second season set for February 2011. The second season officially premiered April 8, 2011 on Canada's TVtropolis. The series was not renewed for a third season.

== Characters ==
- Parker Kovak (voiced by Kristin Booth): The overworked, underpaid daytime talk show producer of The Dee Show. A kind-hearted but mildly neurotic woman in her late twenties. She is of Eastern-European descent.
- Dee (voiced by Kim Cattrall): The ageless, alcoholic, nymphomaniac, very glamorous and very high maintenance star of The Dee Show. She was raised by a family of cougars in the California mountains.
- Simon Nolan (voiced by Aaron Abrams): The left wing, slacker writer for The Dee Show, and Parker's good friend who has a relatively secret crush on her.
- Chicago Hyatt (voiced by Sarah Cornell): Parker's beautiful, yet under-qualified "loose" blonde intern, as well as her unwitting confidant. She is also Blake's third cousin.
- Blake Bellamy (voiced by Peter Keleghan): The young, charming, absent-minded British station owner of Bellamy Broadcasting, and cousin of Chicago. Parker has a crush on him and he has, as he puts it, "some sort of feeling" for her.
- Massimo (voiced by Jamie Watson): Parker's talking dog, and her main companion. A refined canine friend who enjoys the fine arts, good wine and endlessly chasing his own tail.
- Hal (voiced by David Huband): Handy man and operator on The Dee Show. Also known to be a contractor/olympic diver/dog groomer/ordained satanist minister.
- Russell (voiced by Jamie Watson): Dee's flamboyant, image-driven gay personal stylist and best friend.
- Victoria Lafayette (voiced by Karen LeBlanc): Victoria is the charitative host of The Victoria Show whom Dee sees as her enemy and who once hired Parker as her producer. She runs several international charities. She physically resembles Queen Latifah and her personality is similar to Oprah's.
- Antique Annie (voiced by Julie Lemieux): She is the elderly host of an Antiques roadshow style show. In the episode "Dee Mother Load" it is hinted that she is Dee's biological mother.
- Dr. William Perry (voiced by Martin Roach): A chemist and relationship fidelity expert who is featured as a recurrent guest on The Dee Show and also acts as a de facto physician for the show's crew.
- James Hard (voiced by Peter Keleghan): Television news anchor of "Hard News Report"
- Jeremy: Chicago's friend and lover, and also works as the mail carrier of The Dee Show.

== Episode list ==
=== Series overview ===
Season	Episodes	Originally aired	
Season	Episodes	First aired	Last aired
1	13	May 4, 2009	July 27, 2009
2	13	April 8, 2011	July 8, 2011

=== Season 1 (2009) ===
No. overall	No. in season	Title	Storyboard by	Original release date
1	1	"Producing Parker (Pilot)"	TBA	May 4, 2009
In the Pilot episode, Parker Novak hopes to get promoted to producer of "The Dee Show", and first meets her beautiful but promiscuous intern, Chicago Hyatt. Meanwhile, Dee is upset about the small size of her bottom.
2	2	"Model Moms"	TBA	May 11, 2009
Dee orders Parker to get her a baby after a segment from the Model Moms; however, once she gets them, the babies happen to be conjoined and Dee decides to have them get plastic surgery.
3	3	"The Skinny on Parker"	TBA	May 18, 2009
Dee decides to become obese for higher ratings and Parker begins dating Günter Fürst, an action star and former Republican senator turned fitness guru who takes her on extreme action movie work-outs. When she realizes the work-outs really make her lose weight, Parker begins getting obsessed with physical fitness.
4	4	"A Friend in Dee"	TBA	May 25, 2009
Dee decides to become friends with Parker, and Parker finds Dee to be an irritating friend. Meanwhile, Simon uses his skills to try and expose the horrific problems of a third-world spa resort while failing to realize that he is actually the one causing the problems.
5	5	"Renovating Parker"	TBA	June 1, 2009
"The Dee Show" decides to get a makeover after Dee's floor partly breaks. Dee orders Parker to find her a hot and attractive contractor. Parker uses Hal and turns him into a hunky contractor, but things start to get worse as Hal decides to abandon "The Dee Show" and move to the rival "The Victoria Show".
6	6	"Dog Dee Afternoon"	TBA	June 8, 2009
Dee kicks Parker's dog 'Massimo' while on-the-air, which creates a controversy that might cost Parker her job.
7	7	"In Dee Club"	TBA	June 15, 2009
Dee tries to become a lesbian after a break-out scandal involving her rival Victoria Lafayette and a Catholic nun; meanwhile, Parker dates a robot which she eventually decides to bring to her family wedding.
8	8	"And Dee Winner Is..."	TBA	June 22, 2009
After she doesn't get nominated for a Blabby Award while Parker does, Dee goes into a mad frenzy. Dee goes over the edge and joins a group called Losers Anonymous, which teaches her to let go of her ambition. Meanwhile, Simon runs a betting pool on when and how Dee will have a nervous breakdown.
9	9	"Age Dee-fying"	TBA	June 29, 2009
Dee mutates into a half-woman/half snake when being treated with poisonous snake venom. Simon undertakes a mission to determine Dee's age using Antique Annie.
10	10	"Mentoring Parker"	TBA	July 6, 2009
With Chicago leaving for a role in a movie, Parker finally has the chance to hire a perfect intern. But when Dee gave an audience member the job position, she turns out to be more reliable than she expected. But is this audience member too good to be true or something else?
11	11	"Eat, Pray, Parker"	TBA	July 13, 2009
After reading "Feast, Ride, Salsa," Parker decides to go shop for a motorcycle. Meanwhile, Dee gets ready for her bookclub segment on the show with the guest author, Jackie Cartwright of the book Parker (and eventually Dee) read. But is Parker's guest hiding something?
12	12	"A Recipe for Dee-saster"	TBA	July 20, 2009
Dee bakes some cookies on the show. But when she eats one, Dee chokes on it and becomes unconscious (almost dies). That prompts a T.V. private detective to come in, ask and put Parker in hot water as the person of interest and soon the prime suspect. Will Parker be innocent or guilty as charged?
13	13	"All About Dee"	TBA	July 27, 2009
When a guest on the Dee Show is an author of a book on how to be selfish, Dee decides to marry him. Meanwhile, Parker gets a call from none other than Victoria Lafayette, Dee's nemesis, offering her a job at the Victoria Show. But when Dee's wedding demands starts to mount on Parker, she had enough of Dee and her demands. So she does the inevitable and works for Victoria, while leaving a stressed out Dee and a planned televised wedding. Will Parker come back in time and help Dee say "I do?"

=== Season 2 (2011) ===
No. overall	No. in season	Title	Storyboard by	Original release date
14	1	"Bully for Parker"	TBA	April 8, 2011
Parker puts Simon in charge of his first story and learns to never do that again when she becomes the focus of his segment and is forced to confront her high school bully, Tyler Van Bustle (voiced by guest star Jason Priestley), live on The Dee Show. Dee learns that she can be a bit a bully when Russell confronts her about her behavior.
15	2	"Man Trap"	TBA	April 15, 2011
Parker believes she's a great matchmaker and forces Simon to participate in The Dee Show's matchmaking show. However, it turns out that Parker and Simon have very different ideas of the kind of girl he should end up with.
16	3	"The Dee Block"	TBA	April 22, 2011
Dee steals Victoria's Nobel Peace prize and Parker forces her to break into Victoria's corporate headquarters to put it back. It's too bad for both of them that they get caught breaking in and get sent straight to jail.
17	4	"Giving Up Dee Ghost"	TBA	April 29, 2011
After his plane crashes in the tundra, Blake Bellamy is presumed dead and his ghost begins to haunt Parker, who believes that his ghost is hanging around to confess his love for her. Meanwhile, The Dee Show features "The Ghost Shouter", a woman who can make ghosts talk through her to the living, which upsets Dee because no ghost wants to talk to her.
18	5	"Lying Cheating Dirty Dogs"	TBA	May 6, 2011
Parker becomes infuriated when Massimo begins to spend more time with his dog walker, Sally, than with her; though Massimo and Sally's friendship runs stale when Massimo becomes the subject of Sally's dark, little secret. Meanwhile, Dee does everything in her power to sleep with her guest on the show, Dr. William Perry, an expert in marital fidelity.
19	6	"15 Minutes of Parker"	TBA	May 13, 2011
When Bellamy research indicates that Dee's no longer relatable to her viewers, Blake decides to give her a co-host the average female viewer can relate to—Parker.
20	7	"How Green Was My Parker"	TBA	May 20, 2011
Parker is introduced to the world of environmentalism when she meets a cute activist named Ethan. Parker eventually becomes the most hardcore of them all. Meanwhile, Dee looks to buy a new car on the show.
21	8	"Deehab"	TBA	May 27, 2011
The crew of the Dee Show go into a rehab clinic and sign Dee up for alcoholism therapy so they can get inside and sign up famous Australian actor Lance Parfait for an interview. However, while staying there, the clinic's owner Dr. Chang concludes that Parker is a workaholic and the crew has her committed to undergo rehab therapy.
22	9	"Dee Mother Load"	TBA	June 3, 2011
Blake asks Parker to travel with him to a television conference but Parker has to deal with her mother (voiced by guest star Catherine O'Hara) visiting unexpectedly. In order to distract her mother, Parker tells Dee (who never knew her mother and was instead raised by a family of cougars) to spend time with her mother to see what a mother-daughter bond feels like.
23	10	"Parker vs. Parker"	TBA	June 10, 2011
When Victoria Lafayette retires, The Dee Show gets a new guest booker called Zach Parker, whom Parker becomes jealous of. After an alien spaceship crashes on a suburban home, Parker and Zach compete to see who can book the aliens for an interview first. Meanwhile, Dee wins a Blabby for a show in which she interviewed the Jesus Christ and tries to rub her success in the retired Victoria's face.
24	11	"Parker 3.0"	TBA	June 17, 2011
Blake sells the Bellamy network to new owners which consist of a giant computer looking to get rid of anybody deemed unneeded.
25	12	"Real Men Eat Parker"	TBA	June 24, 2011
Determined to become more manly, Simon begins taking special "mAn" pills that Dr. Perry gives him. After the results become clear, Parker asks Simon out on a date, during which he accidentally overdoses on the pills and discovers that a side effect is lycanthropy. Simultaneously, Parker competes against Dee for the presidency of the station's women's union.
26	13	"The Parker Prophecies"	TBA	July 8, 2011
Dee uses a time machine to turn back the clock and become a teenager again while Parker uses the same machine to get a glimpse of her future. When Parker doesn't like what she sees, she impulsively changes her future by marrying Blake.
