= One Night Stand (2011 film) =

- Directed by: Elisabeth Sperling; Trish Dalton
- Produced by: Elisabeth Sperling for Overnight Musicals LLC
- Starring: Cheyenne Jackson; Mandy Gonzalez; Roger Bart; Rachel Dratch; Jesse Tyler Ferguson
- Release date: July 2011
- Country: United States

One Night Stand is a 2011 documentary film that documents the 24 Hour Musicals event that featured the creation of four musicals in a 24-hour period. The film had its World Premiere at the July 2011 NewFest, New York's LGBT Film Festival and features Cheyenne Jackson, Mandy Gonzalez, Roger Bart.
