= Theatrical producer =

Person who oversees the staging of theatre productions

A theatrical producer is a person who is primarily responsible for providing or procuring financial resources for developing a theatre production. The producer oversees the managerial and financial aspects of the production such as budgeting and managing contracts with venues, personnel, and investors.

== History ==
The role of theatrical producers dates back to ancient times. Ancient theatrical producers include choragi, which were wealthy citizen of Athens that funded dramatic or musical performances at festivals during the fourth and fifth centuries, B.C. In Ancient Greece, theatrical productions were public ceremonies so the government funded the actors' salaries. Choragi were responsible for funding the other expenses required for the production, including the salaries, training, and costumes of the musicians and chorus.

In three hundred B.C., the role of choragus was replaced by the agonothete, a government director elected annually to oversee the production of theatrical performances using state funds.

== Terminology ==
The term "producer" is American in origin, referring to the person responsible for the financial aspects of producing a play, including acquiring the rights to produce it; renting a theatre; hiring actors and staff; and selling tickets. In Britain, these functions were carried out by the manager, while the person responsible for staging the play (now called the "director") was traditionally referred to as the producer.

== Role ==
An independent producer may initiate the production—finding the script and starting the process. The producer finds the director and pursues the primary goals, to coordinate business and financial aspects in the service of the creative realization of the playwright's vision. This may include casting, but often only includes casting approval. The producer secures funds for the production, either through their own company or by bringing investors into the production in a limited partnership agreement. In this business structure, the producer becomes the general partner with unlimited liability, and because of this, often brings in other general partners. The producer often options the play from the playwright, which includes rights to future production for film and television. The producer earns the right to future ventures because the original theatrical production enhances the value of an artistic property. This right to further options may be included in the royalty agreement. In other duties, the producer may work with theatrical agents, negotiate with unions, find other staff, secure the theatre and rehearsal hall, obtain liability and workers' compensation insurance, and post bonds with unions.

Another kind of producer is the non-independent, or line producer, who facilitates other people's projects. A repertory or repertoire or festival or non-profit or amateur organization often use a managing director, and creative decisions fall to the artistic director. In theatres with no managing director, artistic directors often use the title producing artistic director or managing artistic director, to indicate a higher level of responsibility.

=== Managerial role ===
The producer manages the business and legal aspect of employing staff. Hiring creative staff and teams often involves the director and playwright's approval. The producer hires the production team, including the general manager, production manager, house manager, stage manager, and related managerial personnel at their discretion. In many cases, venues require that the producer use front of house staff (such as the house manager, box office, ushers, etc.) and backstage personnel (stage hands, electrician, carpenter, etc.) supplied by the theatre.

The producer creates and oversees the budget, sets ticket prices, chooses performance dates and times, and develops a marketing and advertising strategy for the production. Publicity and marketing teams are often outsourced and hired by the producer.

The producer collaborates with the director and staff to create a production timeline and deadlines for various aspects of the production to ensure a successful show opening and run. The producer and director oversee this timeline, with periodic re-assessment and modifications as needed.

The producer is often in charge of hiring legal representation to mitigate liability issues such as union contracts and risks associated with external investors. The producer oversees the budget. The theatre owner provides box office services and turns over net ticket sales revenue. If sales fall under a set minimum level, the unprofitable show may close. If ticket sales are good and the show makes a profit, the producer may get a portion of the net profit, and the rest going to the investors. Since highly successful shows with large profits are the uncommon, independent commercial production is considered a high risk business.

=== Levels of involvement ===
In the commercial world of Broadway and West End, it is common to list the producer's name above show titles. Some producers invest in the production or are the theatre owners and may have little or no say in running the production. A producer credit occasionally applies to people who perform special important services, such as finding a theatre or a star—but normally, the credit for such roles is associate producer.

== In popular culture ==
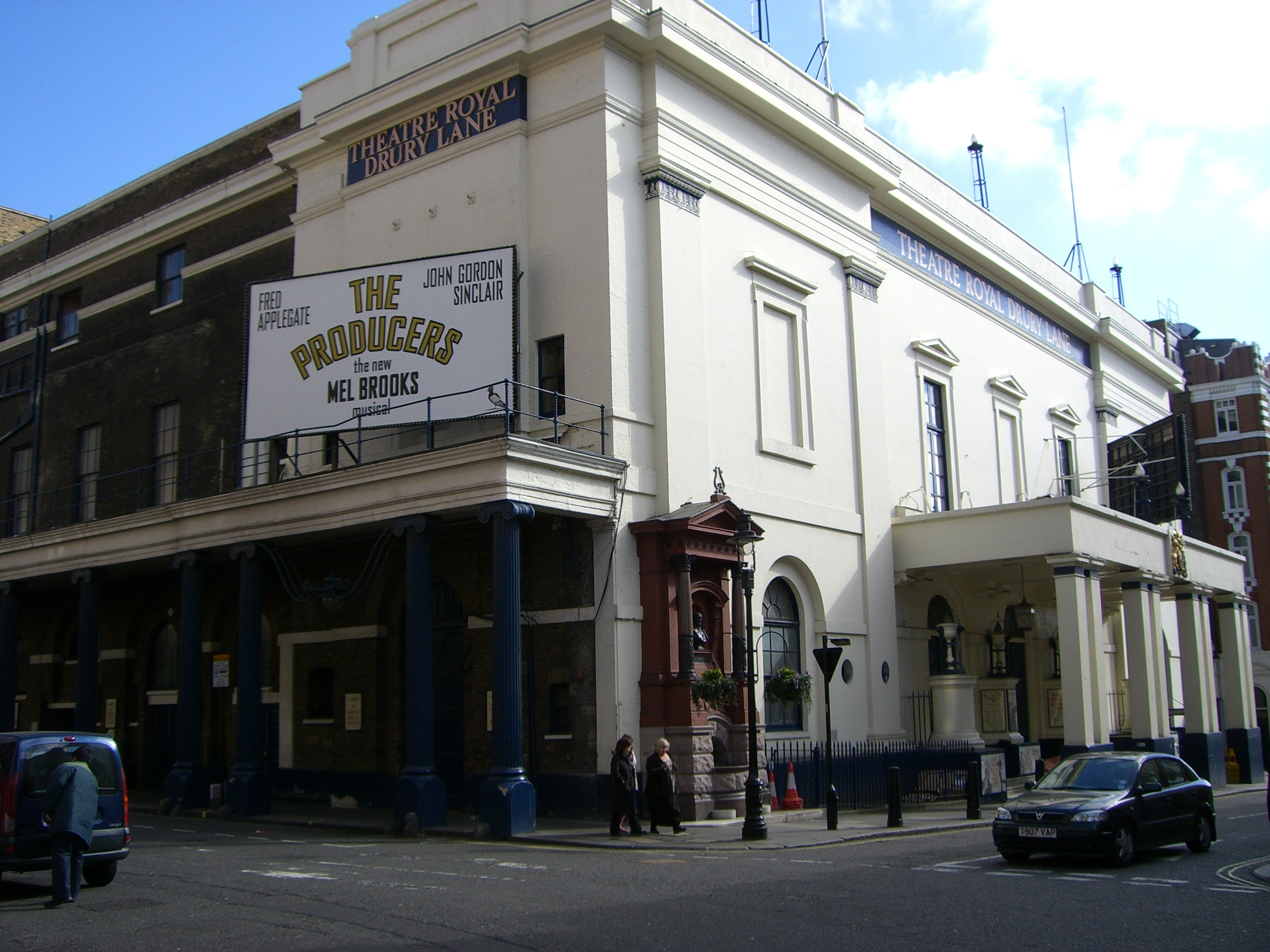
Marquee outside Theatre Royal, Drury Lane advertising The Producers

The Producers is a 1967 dark comedy film written by Mel Brooks about a struggling former Broadway producer and his new accountant who devise a scheme to scam investors by producing a play that flops. The producer, played by Zero Mostel, and the accountant, played by Gene Wilder, find themselves in trouble when their play becomes an unexpected hit. The 1967 film was adapted into a musical of the same name, starring Nathan Lane and Matthew Broderick. The musical opened on April 14, 2001 and won a total of twelve Tony Awards. The musical was then adapted into a movie musical in 2005, starring Nathan Lane and Matthew Broderick reprising their original Broadway roles.
