= List of The Producers characters =

The following are fictional characters from the 1967 film The Producers, the Broadway musical based on it, and the 2005 film adaptation of the musical.

== Leopold "Leo" Bloom ==
Leopold "Leo" Bloom is a timid and mild-mannered accountant, prone to panic attacks and who keeps a fragment of his childhood blue blanket in his pocket to calm himself. Towards the end of the film, when Leo tries to turn himself in and use his accountant books as evidence, Max stops Leo on the way out the door and steals Leo's books, causing Leo to lose his temper and attack Max in a fit of rage, demanding the books back and repeatedly calling him "fat fatty." Nevertheless, it is Leo who first comes up with the idea of how to make money from a failed play.

The character is named after the protagonist in James Joyce's Ulysses, Leopold Bloom. Wilder's costar Zero Mostel had portrayed Joyce's Bloom on stage in the play Ulysses in Nighttown.

Leopold "Leo" Bloom
- First appearance: The Producers (1967)
- Last appearance: Trumped (2016 – Jimmy Kimmel sketch)
- Created by: Mel Brooks
- Portrayed by: Gene Wilder (1967 film); Matthew Broderick (Broadway musical, 2005 film, and Jimmy Kimmel Live sketch)

In-universe information
- Gender: Male
- Occupation: Theatrical producer Accountant
- Spouse: Ulla Inga Hansen Benson Yansen Tallen Hallen Svaden Swansson Bloom
- Nationality: American

== Maximilian "Max" Bialystock ==
Maximilian "Max" Bialystock
- First appearance: The Producers (1967)
- Last appearance: Trumped (2016 – Jimmy Kimmel sketch)
- Created by: Mel Brooks
- Portrayed by: Zero Mostel (1967 film); Nathan Lane (Broadway musical, 2005 film, Jimmy Kimmel Live sketch), and Larry David (Curb Your Enthusiasm).

In-universe information
- Gender: Male
- Occupation: Theatrical producer
- Nationality: American

Maximilian "Max" Bialystock is described as selfish, arrogant, fiery, impatient, bullying, charismatic, intimidating, and fast-talking - a man who is only interested in making quick money. Though this is later proven untrue, Max's forceful and loud nature can be quite frightful and bullying. Apparently without scruples, he is willing to do anything to make money (including "shtupping every little old lady in New York") and is often motivated, duplicitous and unwilling to cooperate diplomatically. His name is taken from the Polish city of Białystok.

== Ulla ==
Ulla Inga Hansen Benson Yansen Tallen Hallen Svaden Swansson Bloom
- First appearance: The Producers (1967)
- Last appearance: The Producers (2005)
- Created by: Mel Brooks
- Portrayed by: Lee Meredith (1967 film); Cady Huffman (Broadway musical); Uma Thurman (2005 film)

In-universe information
- Gender: Female
- Occupation: Secretary; Actress
- Spouse: Leo Bloom
- Nationality: Swedish

Ulla is a pretty young Swedish woman who becomes Max's secretary. In the original 1967 film, Ulla is introduced as a "toy" that Max found in the local library, and is a symbol of his newfound affluence. She can speak little English, but is a good go-go dancer, indeed she can dance far better than she can type. She also constantly says "God dag på dig", which means "good day to you" in Swedish (with a faux-Swedish accent), and provides a sexier counterpoint to Max's much older girlfriends.

In both the musical and the film adapted from it, Ulla's role is greatly expanded. She is a stereotypical Swedish woman: tall and beautiful with lovely blonde hair. Ulla introduces herself as a Swedish actress looking for a part in Max and Leo's production of Springtime for Hitler, performing a song she wrote called "When You Got It, Flaunt It". While casting hasn't begun yet, Max and Leo are both taken with her and hire her as their secretary/receptionist. At one point, she paints Max's office entirely white, not understanding the meaning of the phrase "tidy up". She falls in love with Leo, driving a wedge between him and Max, and, following the unwanted success of the musical, the two flee to Rio de Janeiro, leaving Max behind to face punishment. Ulla's full first name is given as Ulla Inga Hansen Benson Yansen Tallen Hallen Svaden Swansson. Her (presumably just as long) surname is not given, but she changes it, upon marrying Leo, to Bloom.

Little of her role in the Springtime for Hitler play is shown, but she plays a showgirl representing the German Imperial Eagle and later appears as Marlene Dietrich. In Max and Leo's second production, Prisoners of Love, she plays the lead prisoner/singer.

== Roger De Bris ==
Roger De Bris
- First appearance: The Producers (1967)
- Last appearance: The Producers (2005)
- Created by: Mel Brooks
- Portrayed by: Christopher Hewett (1967 film); Gary Beach (Broadway musical and 2005 film)

In-universe information
- Gender: Male
- Occupation: Theatre director
- Spouses: Carmen Ghia, ("common law assistant")
- Nationality: American

Roger Elizabeth De Bris is a flamboyant, overtly gay theatre director and transvestite, described by Max Bialystock as the “worst director to have ever lived”, and is chosen by Bialystock in an attempt to ensure that Springtime for Hitler will flop. He lives with his equally flamboyant partner and valet Carmen Ghia and his production crew in a house described as an Upper East Side town house in New York. While the musical and the 2005 film clarify his sexuality, it is only implied in the original film. "Roger" is a euphemism for intercourse, and a "bris" is the Jewish circumcision ceremony, while the surname is also a pun on the word "debris". He has been said to be a parody of Ed Wood.

The musical adds a new storyline for Roger in which he replaces Franz as Adolf Elizabeth Hitler, and his campy take on the dictator causes the musical to be seen as satire, transforming it into a smash hit rather than the expected flop. De Bris is thrilled, whereas Max is furious.

== Carmen Ghia ==
Carmen Ghia
- First appearance: The Producers (1967)
- Last appearance: The Producers (2005)
- Created by: Mel Brooks
- Portrayed by: Andreas Voutsinas (1967 film); Roger Bart (Broadway musical and 2005 film)

In-universe information
- Gender: Male
- Occupation: Common law assistant
- Spouse: Roger De Bris
- Nationality: American

Carmen Ghia is the partner and secretary of Roger De Bris. He is played by Andreas Voutsinas in the 1967 film. In the 2001 Broadway show The Producers and the 2005 musical film The Producers he is played by Roger Bart.

The character is named after the Karmann Ghia, marketed from 1955 to 1974 by Volkswagen. Carmen Ghia is Roger De Bris' "common-law assistant". They are both flamboyantly gay and they love to flounce around their Upper East Side town house.

Voutsinas was a friend of Brooks' wife Anne Bancroft, who performed with him at The Actors Studio. She recommended him for the role of Carmen Ghia feeling his natural Greek accent would contribute to the role's comedy. According to Voutsinas, who did Ghia's own make-up, Brooks instructed him to "look like Rasputin and behave like Marilyn Monroe".

After playing Carmen in the original stage musical company, Bart later transitioned to the lead role of Leo Bloom. Looking back on the differences between the two roles, he commented: "As Carmen Ghia I was a sprinter. This guy is like a long-distance runner. I sometimes think to myself, 'Should I have stayed Carmen?'"

== Franz Liebkind ==
Franz Liebkind
- First appearance: The Producers (1967)
- Last appearance: The Producers (2005)
- Created by: Mel Brooks
- Portrayed by: Kenneth Mars (1967 film); Brad Oscar (Broadway musical); Will Ferrell (2005 film)

In-universe information
- Gender: Male
- Occupation: Playwright
- Nationality: German

Franz Liebkind (Liebkind being a humorous calque into German of the English idiom "love child") is a former Nazi soldier who has penned an admiring musical tribute to Adolf Hitler, titled Springtime for Hitler. The two protagonists, Max Bialystock and Leo Bloom, purchase and produce this "worst play ever written" as part of a plot to defraud investors by overselling and staging a sure-fire flop.

The part was originally cast for Dustin Hoffman, but Mel Brooks allowed him to audition for the film adaptation of The Graduate before shooting began for his own film in anticipation that he would be rejected, as his wife Anne Bancroft was cast as Mrs. Robinson. Instead, Hoffman was cast as the lead of the film directed by Mike Nichols and Brooks thus had to recast the Liebkind role.

Liebkind is portrayed as easily angered and emotionally unstable. The only background to his character is that he is a Nazi, carrier pigeon keeper (he named his favorite pigeon Adolf), and playwright who continues to worship Hitler. In the 2005 film he is seen sending one of his pigeons with a message to Argentina. In an early draft of the script, he was portrayed as Hitler's former butler.

Liebkind is shown to be nervous about his past catching up with him. When Bialystock and Bloom go up to his roof to ask about acquiring the rights to Springtime for Hitler, Liebkind thinks they are from the US government and says 'I vos never a member of ze Nazi Party! I only followed orders! I had nozing to do viz ze vor! I didn't even know zere vos a vor going on! Ve lived in ze back near Switzerland.' While in court for bombing the theater, he hums "America the Beautiful" to try to convince authorities that he's not an immigrant.

In the musical and the 2005 film adaptation of the musical, Liebkind is set to play the role of Hitler in his musical, but breaks a leg and is replaced by Roger De Bris. This differs from the 1967 film, in which Lorenzo St. DuBois (L.S.D.) is cast as Hitler. When in the original he blows up the theatre with Max and Leo, he is hurt the most because he uses a quick-fuse and doesn't escape quickly enough, and is next shown in court in an all-body cast. In the musical and 2005 film, he breaks one of his legs moments before the curtains rise when Max tries to invoke the "Good Luck" superstition, then hours later he tries to flee the police on his broken leg but inevitably breaks the other leg by falling down a flight of stairs. Months later, while Max, Leo and Franz are in Sing Sing Prison, Franz is seen with both legs in casts while playing the piano to the tune of "Prisoners of Love".

== Lorenzo St. DuBois ==
Lorenzo St. DuBois
- First appearance: The Producers (1967)
- Last appearance: The Producers (1967)
- Created by: Mel Brooks
- Portrayed by: Dick Shawn

In-universe information
- Gender: Male
- Nationality: American

Lorenzo St. DuBois, also known by his initials "L.S.D.", is a charismatic but only semi-coherent, flower power hippie (flower child) who can barely remember his own name.

L.S.D. is cast as Hitler after he had wandered into the wrong theatre by mistake during the casting call. In the opening performance of Springtime for Hitler, the audience is initially horrified by the tasteless musical play and begins to leave, but L.S.D.'s beatnik-like portrayal of Hitler (and misunderstanding of the story) is found to be hilarious, causing the audience to misinterpret the production as a satire. As a result, Springtime for Hitler is declared a smash hit.

L.S.D. appears only in the 1967 film. In the musical and the 2005 film, Franz Liebkind is cast as Hitler, but breaks his leg moments before curtain and is replaced by Roger De Bris, whose campy take on Hitler is mistaken for satire, causing the same effect of the play being a hit.
