= The Producers (1967 film) =

Film by Mel Brooks

- Theatrical release poster
- Directed by: Mel Brooks
- Written by: Mel Brooks
- Produced by: Sidney Glazier
- Starring: Gene Wilder; Zero Mostel; Dick Shawn
- Cinematography: Joseph Coffey
- Edited by: Ralph Rosenblum
- Music by: John Morris
- Distributed by: Embassy Pictures
- Release dates: November 22, 1967 (Pittsburgh); March 18, 1968 (wide release)
- Running time: 88 minutes
- Country: United States
- Language: English
- Budget: $941,000
- Box office: $1.6 million (Rentals)

The Producers is a 1967 American satirical black comedy film written and directed by Mel Brooks, and starring Gene Wilder, Zero Mostel, Dick Shawn, and Kenneth Mars. The film is about a mild-mannered accountant and a con artist theater producer who scheme to get rich by fraudulently overselling shares in a stage musical designed to fail. To this end, they find a playscript celebrating Adolf Hitler and the Nazis and bring it to the stage. Because of this theme, The Producers was controversial from the start and received mixed reviews. It became a cult film, and found a positive critical reception later.

The Producers was Brooks's directorial debut. For the film, he won an Academy Award for Best Original Screenplay. In 1996, the film was selected for preservation in the United States National Film Registry by the Library of Congress as being "culturally, historically, or aesthetically significant" and placed eleventh on the AFI's 100 Years...100 Laughs list. It was later adapted by Brooks and Thomas Meehan as a stage musical, which itself was adapted into a film again in 2005.

== Plot ==
Max Bialystock is an aging Broadway producer whose career has veered from great success to the depths of near failure. He now ekes out a hand-to-mouth existence while romancing lascivious, wealthy elderly women in exchange for money for a "next play" that may never be produced. Leopold "Leo" Bloom, a neurotic young accountant prone to hysterics, arrives at Max's office to audit his accounts and discovers a $2,000 discrepancy in the accounts of Max's last play. Max persuades Leo to hide the fraud, and Leo realizes that, since a flop is expected to lose money, the IRS will not investigate its finances, and the investors will not expect a large financial return, so a producer could earn more from a flop than from a hit by overselling interests and embezzling the funds. However, Leo also points out that if the play is a hit, the producer would be charged with fraud since it would be impossible to cover paying the large amount of backers needed for such a plan. Max decides to make this into a scheme, and use the profits to flee to Rio de Janeiro. He convinces Leo to join him, treating him to lunch and a day out and saying that his drab life in accounting is little different from prison anyway. Leo has an epiphany and agrees to the con.

The partners find the ideal play for their scheme: Springtime for Hitler: A Gay Romp with Adolf and Eva at Berchtesgaden, a "love letter to Hitler" written by deranged ex-Nazi soldier Franz Liebkind. Max and Leo bond with Franz over schnapps and tell him they want to show the world a positive representation of Hitler. Now with the stage rights, Max goes to work seducing as many old rich women as possible, selling 25,000% of the play to investors. Right away, he uses some of the money to redecorate the office and hire an attractive Swedish receptionist, Ulla. They sign on Roger De Bris as their director based on his extraordinarily poor reputation, who immediately demands revisions to the play and a happy ending in which the Nazis win the war. The part of Hitler goes to a hippie actor named Lorenzo St. DuBois (nicknamed "L.S.D.") who accidentally wandered into the wrong theater during the casting call.

At the theater on opening night, Max tries to ensure a harshly negative review by appearing to attempt to bribe a New York Times theatre critic. Despite a promising start, with a distasteful opening number that causes several walk-outs ("Springtime for Hitler and Germany/Winter for Poland and France"), Max, Leo and Franz are horrified to see De Bris's revisions, and L.S.D.'s beatnik-like portrayal of Hitler, have turned the admiring tribute into a campy, comedic satire. Springtime for Hitler is declared a hit.

Back at their office, as Max and Leo are fighting after the latter attempts to turn himself in to get a plea bargain, a gun-wielding Franz confronts them, angered by the audience laughing at the depiction of Hitler. He tries first to shoot them, and then himself, but runs out of bullets. The three then decide to blow up the theater to end the production, but they are caught in the explosion and arrested. At the trial, where they are found "incredibly guilty" by the jury, Leo makes an impassioned statement praising Max, even for his faults, for being his friend and changing his life for the greater good (even as he also calls Max "the most selfish man I ever met in my life.") Max claims that they have learned their lesson and will never do such misdeeds again.

Max, Leo, and Franz are sent to the state penitentiary, where they produce a new musical called Prisoners of Love with their fellow inmates. While Max and Franz supervise rehearsals, Leo is put in charge of the money, overselling shares of the play to interested prisoners and the warden.

== Cast ==
- Zero Mostel as Max Bialystock
- Estelle Winwood as "Hold Me Touch Me"
- Christopher Hewett as Roger De Bris
- Kenneth Mars as Franz Liebkind
- Lee Meredith as Ulla
- Renée Taylor as Eva Braun
- Andreas Voutsinas as Carmen Ghia
- Bill Hickey as The Drunk
- David Patch as Joseph Goebbels
- Barney Martin as Hermann Göring
- Madlyn Cates as Concierge
- Shimen Ruskin as The Landlord
- Frank Campanella as The Bartender
- Josip Elic as Violinist
- John Zoller as Drama Critic
- Brutus Peck as Hot Dog Vendor
- Dick Shawn as Lorenzo St. DuBois (L.S.D.)
- Gene Wilder as Leopold "Leo" Bloom
- Mel Brooks as singer in "Springtime for Hitler" (voiceover cameo, uncredited)
- Bill Macy as foreman of the jury (uncredited)

== Production ==
I was never crazy about Hitler ... If you stand on a soapbox and trade rhetoric with a dictator you never win ... That's what they do so well: they seduce people. But if you ridicule them, bring them down with laughter, they can't win. You show how crazy they are.

— Mel Brooks, in an August 2001 interview

=== Early publicity ===
A substantive early New York Times account of the property's genesis dates to December 1961: "Edward Padula has acquired a new comedy by Mel Brooks tentatively called 'Springtime for Hitler'. The producer said yesterday that actually 'Hitler is not in the comedy.' 'It's a sort of play-within-a-play. The setting is contemporary England.' Kenneth Williams, rated by Mr. Padula as 'England's new comic discovery' is under consideration for the leading role....Work on the new Brooks comedy will start immediately after the local presentation of 'All American'."

=== Writing and development ===
The title Springtime for Hitler was first coined by Brooks as a joke during the press conference for All American in 1962. Shortly afterwards, he also decided to relate this title to a character named Leo Bloom, an homage to Leopold Bloom, protagonist of James Joyce's Ulysses. It was reused by him years later once he had an idea about "two schnooks on Broadway who set out to produce a flop and swindle the backers". The inspiration was some people Brooks met during his early show business days: Benjamin Kutcher, a New York producer who financed his plays by sleeping with elderly women, became the basis for Max Bialystock, and the scheme had origins in two theater producers who had a lavish lifestyle while making various unsuccessful plays. When imagining what play "would have people packing up and leaving the theatre even before the first act is over", Brooks decided to combine Adolf Hitler and a musical. In a 2001 episode of 60 Minutes, Brooks stated that, while serving in the army, he was called "Jew boy", and he lightheartedly admitted that he made The Producers to "get even" with antisemites, particularly Hitler. In another interview, he further explained his reasoning, stating,

More than anything the great Holocaust by the Nazis is probably the great outrage of the 20th century. There is nothing to compare with it. And ... so what can I do about it? If I get on the soapbox and wax eloquently, it'll be blown away in the wind, but if I do Springtime for Hitler it'll never be forgotten. I think you can bring down totalitarian governments faster by using ridicule than you can with invective.

Brooks first envisioned his story as a novel, and changed it to a play when publishers told him it had "too much dialogue. Not enough narrative". He wrote the script in nine months, with the help of secretary Alfa-Betty Olsen. During the process, he mentioned in an October 1966 interview with Playboy that he was working on Springtime for Hitler, "a play within a play, or a play within a film – I haven't decided yet". Then, it evolved into a screenplay to take advantage of various settings, as "it could go places, it wouldn't have to stay in the office".

As Brooks sought backers for his 30-page film treatment, both major film studios and independent filmmakers rejected Springtime for Hitler, finding the idea of using Hitler for comedy outrageous and tasteless (with some even stating that they would consider the script if Brooks changed it to Springtime for Mussolini). This changed as Brooks's agent arranged for him to have a meeting with a friend of his, New York producer Sidney Glazier. Glazier laughed so much at Brooks's performance of the script, he accepted the project by saying, "We're gonna make it! I don't know how, but we're gonna make this movie!"

Glazier budgeted the film at $1 million, and sought financiers. Half the money came from philanthropist Louis Wolfson, who liked the idea of laughing at a dictator, and the remainder, along with the distribution, was arranged by Joseph E. Levine of Embassy Pictures. Levine's only condition was to change the title, as he felt many distributors would not carry a picture named Springtime for Hitler. Brooks renamed it The Producers, considering it ironic as "these guys are anything but producers". As Brooks "couldn't think of anybody to direct it", eventually he decided to take the task for himself, even though he himself had only directed one play before. While Levine was insecure in having an inexperienced director, Brooks convinced him by saying it would be cost-effective, and he knew how to do physical comedy after being a stage manager in Your Show of Shows.

=== Casting ===
Brooks wanted Zero Mostel as Max Bialystock, feeling he was an energetic actor who could convey such an egotistical character. Glazier sent the script to Mostel's lawyer, but the attorney hated it and never showed it to the actor. Eventually, Brooks had to send the script through Mostel's wife Kathryn Harkin. While Mostel did not like the prospect of playing "a Jewish producer going to bed with old women on the brink of the grave", his wife liked the script so much, she eventually convinced him to accept the role.

Gene Wilder met Brooks in 1963, as Wilder performed with Brooks's then-girlfriend Anne Bancroft in a stage adaptation of Mother Courage. Wilder complained that the audience was laughing at his serious performance, and Brooks replied that Wilder was "a natural comic, you look like Harpo Marx", and said he would cast him as Leo Bloom once he finished the then-titled Springtime for Hitler. When production arrived, Peter Sellers accepted an invitation to play Leo Bloom, but he never contacted Brooks again, so Brooks remembered Wilder, who was about to make his film debut in Bonnie and Clyde. Wilder received the script to The Producers as Brooks visited him backstage during a performance of Luv, and his co-star Renée Taylor was brought for a brief appearance as the actress playing Eva Braun.

Dustin Hoffman was originally cast as Liebkind. According to Brooks, late on the night before shooting began, Hoffman begged Brooks to let him out of his commitment to do the role so he could audition for the starring role in The Graduate. Brooks was aware of the film, which co-starred his now-wife Bancroft, and, skeptical that Hoffman would get the role, agreed to let him audition. When Hoffman did win the role of Ben Braddock, Brooks called in Kenneth Mars as Liebkind. Mars was originally invited because Brooks envisioned him as Roger De Bris, given he played a gay psychiatrist on Broadway. Instead, Mars was interested in the Liebkind role, which became his film debut. He remained in character while not filming as a strategy of method acting. De Bris was instead portrayed by Christopher Hewett, the first actor who read for the role.

Recent American Academy of Dramatic Arts graduate Lee Meredith was invited to audition as Ulla on condition of being able to do a Swedish accent. She borrowed a book from the AADA library to learn the accent, and won the role with a screen test of the scene in which Ulla dances. Bancroft suggested her friend Andréas Voutsinas for the role of Carmen Ghia, feeling his thick Greek accent would fit. Brooks thought of Dick Shawn to play Lorenzo "L.S.D." Saint DuBois, and Shawn accepted because he liked the part and had no other work at the time. Brooks is heard briefly in the film, his voice dubbed over a dancer singing, "Don't be stupid, be a smarty / Come and join the Nazi Party", in the song "Springtime for Hitler". His version of the line is also dubbed into each performance of the musical, as well as the 2005 movie version.

=== Filming ===
Principal photography for The Producers began on May 22, 1967. Filming had to be done in 40 days on a $941,000 budget, and Brooks managed to fit both requests. The primary location was the Chelsea Studios in New York City, where the musical version (2005) was also shot. The now-demolished Playhouse Theatre hosted the Springtime for Hitler play, and various actors who heard the film was seeking an actor for Hitler were cast in the musical number. The crew tried to film on location whenever possible, filming at such midtown Manhattan locales as Central Park, the Empire State Building, and Lincoln Center.

Brooks's lack of knowledge of filmmaking had him committing many mistakes during production, requiring the help of assistant director Michael Hertzberg. Being both inexperienced and insecure, Brooks started to have tantrums and behave angrily. He got impatient with the slow development compared to how quick television production was, temporarily banned Glazier from the set, berated a visiting reporter from The New York Times, and had clashes with cinematographer Joseph Coffey and main actor Zero Mostel. Mostel also had a troublesome behavior caused by a leg injury received in a 1960 bus accident, which made his contract feature a clause dismissing Mostel from any work after 5:30 pm. Given the fact that the leg injury got worse in humid weather, the last scene, filmed at the Revson Fountain in Lincoln Center, had Mostel throwing a fit and giving up on production. Glazier had to leave a dentist's appointment and rush to the set where Mostel and Brooks were arguing, and once the producer managed to calm them down, the resulting scene had to be shot all night long.

Despite being described as a lavish production number, "Springtime for Hitler" was not ready until the first rehearsals. Brooks sat with Olsen and first-time composer John Morris at the piano, and improvised some lyrics. Morris then developed the stage performance with choreographer Alan Johnson, instructed to do the number "big, wonderful, flashy, but terrible". As Brooks kept suggesting bizarre costume ideas to enhance the burlesque nature of "Springtime for Hitler", such as women with clothes inspired by beer mugs and pretzels, Johnson decided to showcase them all in a parade.

A few scenes had to be altered from the original script. Leo and Max were to visit the Parachute Jump in Coney Island, but the attraction was closed by the time filming began. Brooks filmed Liebkind making Max and Leo swear the Siegfried Oath, where they promised fealty to Siegfried, accompanied by The Ride of the Valkyries and wearing horned helmets. But feeling that it "went overboard", Brooks cut the scene, which was restored in the stage adaptation.

The art direction and costumes emphasized the color yellow, which Brooks considered a funny color. For the posters in Bialystock's office, production designer Charles Rosen found a collector in the Theater District and doctored a few posters to include the character's name. Rosen also incorporated an anecdote of his life, as he had to share a small elevator with a flamboyant Broadway director, to design the lift at Roger De Bris's house. Principal photography ended on July 15, 1967. Post-production extended for months, as Brooks had gotten final cut privilege, but still had complaints with Ralph Rosenblum regarding his editing.

== Release ==
According to Brooks, after the film was completed, Embassy executives refused to release it as being in "bad taste". The film's premiere in Pittsburgh, Pennsylvania, on November 22, 1967, was a disaster and the studio considered shelving it. However, relief came when Pink Panther star Peter Sellers saw the film privately and placed an advertisement in Variety in support of the film's wide release. Sellers was familiar with the film because, according to Brooks, Sellers "had accepted the role of Bloom and then was never heard from again". The film allegedly was "banned in Germany". The film was screened in New York City in March 1968. The film's wide release took place on March 18, 1968.

The title of the film for the Swedish release uses the translation of the name of the play within the story, Springtime for Hitler. As a result of its success, most of Mel Brooks's subsequent films in Swedish were given similar titles, despite being otherwise unrelated: Springtime for Mother-In-Law, Springtime for the Sheriff, Springtime for Frankenstein, Springtime for the Silent Movies, Springtime for the Lunatics, Springtime for World History, Springtime for Space, and Springtime for the Slum. The practice ended by the time Robin Hood: Men in Tights was released, at Brooks's request.

== Reception ==
When it was first released, the film received a mixed response and garnered some exceptionally harsh reviews, while others considered it a great success. One of the mixed reviews came from Renata Adler, who, writing for The New York Times, stated: "The Producers, which opened yesterday at the Fine Arts Theater, is a violently mixed bag. Some of it is shoddy and gross and cruel; the rest is funny in an entirely unexpected way." About the acting, she writes that Mostel is "overacting grotesquely under the direction of Mel Brooks" and that, in the role of Max Bialystock, he is "as gross and unfunny as only an enormous comedian bearing down too hard on some frail, tasteless routines can be". Co-star Wilder fares better and is called "wonderful", thanks to doing "fine", despite being "forced to be as loud and as fast as Mostel" and "[g]oing through long, infinitely variegated riffs and arpeggios of neuroticism", and playing his part "as though he were Dustin Hoffman being played by Danny Kaye". She also puts the movie into the bigger context of "contemporary" comedy and that it has the same "episodic, revue quality" in the way it is "not building laughter, but stringing it together skit after skit, some vile, some boffo". Her early conclusion, at the end of the first paragraph, is also a comparison to other comedic movies of the time, it reads: "[The Producers] is less delicate than Lenny Bruce, less funny than Dr. Strangelove, but much funnier than The Loved One or What's New Pussycat?"

The more critical and negative reviews partly targeted the directorial style and broad ethnic humor, but also commonly noted the bad taste and insensitivity of devising a broad comedy about two Jews conspiring to cheat theatrical investors by devising a designed-to-fail tasteless Broadway musical about Hitler only 22 years after the end of World War II. Among the harshest critics were Stanley Kauffmann in The New Republic, who wrote that "the film bloats into sogginess" and "Springtime for Hitler ... doesn't even rise to the level of tastelessness", John Simon wrote The Producers "is a model of how not to make a comedy", and Pauline Kael who called it "amateurishly crude" in The New Yorker:

The Producers isn't basically unconventional; it only seems so because it's so amateurishly crude and because it revels in the kind of show-business Jewish humor that used to be considered too specialized for movies. Screenwriters used to take the Jewish out but now that television comedians exploit themselves as stereotypes, screenwriters are putting the Jewish in.

On the other hand, others considered the film to be a great success. Time magazine's reviewers wrote that the film was "hilariously funny" but pointed out that "the film is burdened with the kind of plot that demands resolution" but unfortunately "ends in a whimper of sentimentality". Although they labelled it "disjointed and inconsistent", they also praised it as "a wildly funny joy ride", and concluded by saying that "despite its bad moments, [it] is some of the funniest American cinema comedy in years". The film industry trade paper Variety wrote, "The film is unmatched in the scenes featuring Mostel and Wilder alone together, and several episodes with other actors are truly rare." Wanda Hale of the New York Daily News gave the film a full four-star rating and wrote that "Mel Brooks is a conjurer. Nobody but a conjurer could blend insanity and subtlety and make it a howling success as he has done with point with pride and say: 'This is my picture, my first feature movie.' And the place for you to see it and almost die laughing is at the Fine Arts Theater. [...] Anyone, from whose head came this fantasy with profound undertones, can be forgiven for occasional looseness in direction. But even so, Mel Brooks has done remarkably well with his first feature length film which is sheer magic." Joseph Gelmis of Newsday called the film "a high-class low comedy about greed and vanity and the perils of trying to make it on Broadway." He also described Mostel and Wilder as "a thinking man's slapstick team which is equidistant between Laurel and Hardy and W. C. Fields and Franklin Pangborn."

Over the years, the film has gained in stature. On Rotten Tomatoes, the film has an approval rating of 91% based on 76 reviews with an average rating of 8.2/10. The website's critical consensus reads, "A hilarious satire of the business side of Hollywood, The Producers is one of Mel Brooks's finest, as well as funniest films, featuring standout performances by Gene Wilder and Zero Mostel." On Metacritic, the film received a score of 96 based on 6 reviews, indicating "universal acclaim". In his review decades later, Roger Ebert claimed, "this is one of the funniest movies ever made". Ebert wrote, "I remember finding myself in an elevator with Brooks and his wife, actress Anne Bancroft, in New York City a few months after The Producers was released. A woman got onto the elevator, recognized him and said, 'I have to tell you, Mr. Brooks, that your movie is vulgar.' Brooks smiled benevolently. 'Lady,' he said, 'it rose below vulgarity.'"

The film was a sleeper hit at the U.S. box office; but Embassy Pictures deemed its initial theatrical run a flop – considering the additional costs to market and distribute, it barely broke even at the box-office.

=== Accolades ===
Award	Category	Nominee(s)	Result	Ref.
Academy Awards	Best Supporting Actor	Gene Wilder	Nominated	
Academy Awards	Best Story and Screenplay – Written Directly for the Screen	Mel Brooks	Won	
Golden Globe Awards	Best Actor in a Motion Picture – Musical or Comedy	Zero Mostel	Nominated	
Golden Globe Awards	Best Screenplay – Motion Picture	Mel Brooks	Nominated	
National Film Preservation Board	National Film Registry		Inducted	
Satellite Awards	Best DVD Extras		Nominated	
Writers Guild of America Awards	Best Written American Comedy	Mel Brooks	Nominated	
Writers Guild of America Awards	Best Written American Original Screenplay	Mel Brooks	Won	

In 1996, the film was deemed "culturally, historically, or aesthetically significant" by the United States Library of Congress and selected for preservation in the National Film Registry. In 2006, Writers Guild of America West ranked its screenplay 79th in WGA’s list of 101 Greatest Screenplays.

The film is recognized by American Film Institute in these lists:

- 2000: AFI's 100 Years...100 Laughs – #11
- 2004: AFI's 100 Years...100 Songs:
  - "Springtime for Hitler" – #80

== Re-releases and adaptations ==
In 2002, The Producers was re-released in three theaters by Rialto Pictures and earned $111,866 at the box office. As of 2007, the film continues to be distributed to art-film and repertory cinemas by Rialto.

Mel Brooks has adapted the story twice more, as a Broadway musical (The Producers, 2001) and a film based on the musical (The Producers, 2005). He did not direct the latter, but served as a producer.

This film has spawned several home media releases on VHS, Laserdisc, CED, and VCD from companies such as Magnetic Video, Embassy Home Entertainment, PolyGram Video, Speedy, and Lumiere Video. A 1997 letterbox edition Laserdisc was released by PolyGram Video, which served as the basis for the extremely rare 1998 PolyGram DVD release.

Metro-Goldwyn-Mayer, which owns video rights to select Embassy Pictures titles that ended up with Nelson Entertainment and Polygram, released The Producers on Region 1 DVD in 2002 and reissued in 2005 to coincide with the remake released that year. In 2013, MGM licensed the title to Shout! Factory to release a DVD and Blu-ray combo pack with a new HD transfer and newly produced bonus materials. StudioCanal, worldwide rights holder to all of the Embassy Pictures library, has also released several R2 DVD editions using a transfer slightly different from the North American DVD and Blu-Ray releases. In 2018, StudioCanal gave the film its European Blu-Ray debut in the UK, Germany, and Australia. The StudioCanal releases included most extras from the Shout! Factory release as well as a new 4K restoration for a 50th anniversary Blu-ray edition.

== See also ==
- The Butter and Egg Man (1925)
- Jojo Rabbit (2019)
- The Great Dictator (1940)
- List of Curb Your Enthusiasm episodes § Season 4 (2004)
- List of American films of 1967
- List of cult films
- Setting up to fail
