= The Producers (2005 film) =

2005 film by Susan Stroman

- Theatrical release poster
- Directed by: Susan Stroman
- Screenplay by: Mel Brooks; Thomas Meehan
- Based on: The Producers; 2001 musical by: Mel Brooks; Thomas Meehan; The Producers; 1967 film by Mel Brooks
- Produced by: Mel Brooks; Jonathan Sanger
- Starring: Nathan Lane; Matthew Broderick; Uma Thurman; Will Ferrell; Gary Beach; Roger Bart; Jon Lovitz
- Cinematography: John Bailey; Charles Minsky
- Edited by: Steven Weisberg
- Music by: Glen Kelly; Mel Brooks
- Production companies: Universal Pictures; Columbia Pictures; Brooksfilms
- Distributed by: Universal Pictures (United States and Canada); Columbia Pictures (through Sony Pictures Releasing International; International)
- Release date: December 16, 2005
- Running time: 134 minutes
- Country: United States
- Language: English
- Budget: $45 million
- Box office: $38.1 million

The Producers is a 2005 American musical comedy film directed by Susan Stroman and written by Mel Brooks and Thomas Meehan based on the eponymous 2001 Broadway musical, which in turn was based on Brooks' 1967 film of the same name. The film stars an ensemble cast led by Nathan Lane, Matthew Broderick, Uma Thurman, Will Ferrell, Gary Beach, Roger Bart, and Jon Lovitz. Creature effects were provided by Jim Henson's Creature Shop.

The film was released in the United States and Canada by Universal Pictures and internationally by Columbia Pictures (through Sony Pictures Releasing International) in a limited release on December 16, 2005, followed by a wide release on December 25. It garnered generally mixed reviews from critics, and was a commercial failure, earning $38.1 million worldwide from a $45 million budget.

== Plot ==
In 1959, following the flop of the Broadway theatrical musical Funny Boy (based on William Shakespeare's Hamlet) (song: "Opening Night"), the show's washed-up producer Max Bialystock hires the neurotic Leo Bloom as his accountant. In studying Max's books, Leo panics when he discovers a $2,000 discrepancy. While shuffling numbers, he notes that, as a flop is expected to lose money, the IRS will not investigate its finances. He jests that by selling an excess of shares and embezzling the funds, a flop could generate up to $2 million. Max asks for Leo's help with the scheme, only for the latter to refuse ("We Can Do It").

Returning to his old accounting firm, Leo starts to fantasize about being a Broadway producer ("I Wanna Be a Producer"). Leo quits his job and forms "Bialystock & Bloom" with Max. Searching for the worst play ever written, they find Springtime for Hitler, an admiring musical tribute to Adolf Hitler written by ex-Nazi soldier Franz Liebkind. To acquire Franz's rights to the musical, they perform Hitler's favorite song and swear the sacred "Siegfried Oath" to him ("Der Guten Tag Hop-Clop").

Next, Leo and Max meet with failing transvestite director Roger De Bris and his assistant Carmen Ghia. Roger is reluctant to direct, but when Leo and Max suggest he could win a Tony Award, he agrees on the condition that the play be more "gay" ("Keep It Gay"). Back at their office, a Swedish woman named Ulla appears to audition. Although Leo points out that they have not started casting, Max hires her as their secretary until they audition her later ("When You've Got It, Flaunt It").

To gain backers to fund the musical, Max has dalliances with several elderly women ("Along Came Bialy"), allowing him to raise the $2 million. Leo laments about the dangers of sex distracting him from his work and shares a kiss with Ulla ("That Face"). At auditions for the role of Hitler, Franz, angered at a performer's rendition of a German song, storms the stage and performs it himself ("Haben Sie gehört das Deutsche Band?"). Based on the performance, Max hires Franz to play Hitler.

On opening night, as the cast and crew prepare to go on stage, Leo wishes everyone good luck, to which everyone warns it is bad luck to say "good luck" on opening night and that the correct phrase is to say "break a leg" ("You Never Say Good Luck on Opening Night"). Franz leaves to prepare and literally breaks his leg in a fall. Max enlists Roger to perform the role in his place and Roger accepts.

As the show opens, the audience is horrified at the first song ("Springtime for Hitler") and people begin to leave out of disgust until Roger enters as Hitler ("Heil Myself"). Roger, playing Hitler very flamboyantly, makes the audience misinterpret the play as satire, resulting in the show becoming a smash hit. Terrified the IRS will learn of their crimes, a dispute breaks out between Leo and Max, but stops when Roger and Carmen come into the office to congratulate them. Furious at Roger for making the play successful, Max angrily confronts Roger for his actions and even goes as far to physically torture Carmen when he tries to defend Roger. Franz then appears and tries to shoot all four of them for breaking the Siegfried Oath by mocking Hitler, only to attract the police. As Max and Franz attempt to evade the police, Franz breaks his other leg.

Arrested for his tax fraud, Max is imprisoned while Leo elopes with Ulla to Rio de Janeiro ("Betrayed"). About to be sentenced, Max is saved by Leo, who returns to defend him ("'Til Him"). The judge, realizing Leo and Max are inseparable, sentences them both to 5 years at Sing Sing Prison with Franz. Writing and producing a new musical in prison ("Prisoners of Love"), Leo, Max, and Franz are pardoned by the governor of New York for their work, allowing them to collaborate with Roger and Ulla and release Prisoners of Love. The play's success means Leo and Max go on to become successful Broadway producers.

In a post-credits scene, the cast and Mel Brooks sing "Goodbye!" to the audience, telling them it's time to leave.

== Cast ==
- Nathan Lane as Max Bialystock
- Matthew Broderick as Leopold "Leo" Bloom
- Uma Thurman as Ulla Inga Hansen Benson Yansen Tallen Hallen Svaden Swanson (later Bloom)
- Will Ferrell as Franz Liebkind
- Gary Beach as Roger De Bris
- Roger Bart as Carmen Ghia
- Jon Lovitz as Mr. Marks
- Eileen Essell as Hold Me-Touch Me
- David Huddleston as Judge
- Michael McKean as Prison Trustee
- Debra Monk as Lick Me-Bite Me
- Andrea Martin as Kiss Me-Feel Me
- Richard Kind as Jury Foreman
- John Barrowman as the Lead Tenor Stormtrooper
- Brent Barrett as Brian
- Peter Bartlett as Kevin
- Jim Borstelmann as Scott, Donald Dinsmore
- Kathy Fitzgerald as Shirley Markowitz
- Roland Rusinek as Jack Lepidus and soundtrack vocalist
- Jason Antoon as Jason Green
- Bryn Dowling and Meg Gillentine as Usherettes
- Marilyn Sokol as Bag Lady
- Danny Mastrogiorgio as Jail Guard
- Mel Brooks as himself, voices of Tom the Cat, Hilda the Pigeon and German Soldier

=== Puppeteers (Franz Liebkind segment) ===
- Fran Brill – Pigeon
- Tyler Bunch – Pigeon
- James Kroupa – Pigeon
- Tim Lagasse – Pigeon
- Peter Linz – Pigeon
- Drew Massey – Pigeon
- Joey Mazzarino – Pigeon
- Martin P. Robinson – Pigeon
- Matt Vogel – Pigeon
- Victor Yerrid – Tom the Cat, Hilda the Pigeon, Adolf the Pigeon

Lane, Broderick, Beach, and Bart reprised their roles from the stage musical. Nicole Kidman was originally cast as Ulla, but backed out of the project due to other commitments. Ernie Sabella who co-starred alongside Lane and Broderick in The Lion King makes an uncredited cameo appearance as a singing drunk in a deleted scene.

== Soundtrack ==
The Producers Original Motion Picture Soundtrack

Soundtrack album by Mel Brooks
- Released: November 16, 2005
- Genre: Broadway
- Label: Sony
- Producer: Doug Besterman

All tracks are written by Mel Brooks.

No.	Title	Performer(s)	Length
1.	"Overture"	Mel Brooks	0:43
2.	"Opening Night"	Bryn Dowling, Meg Gillentine, and Cast	1:46
3.	"We Can Do It"	Nathan Lane and Matthew Broderick	3:57
4.	"I Wanna Be A Producer"	Matthew Broderick and Cast	6:14
5.	"Der Guten Tag Hop-Clop"	Will Ferrell, Nathan Lane, and Matthew Broderick	1:57
6.	"Keep It Gay"	Gary Beach, Roger Bart, Nathan Lane, Matthew Broderick, Brent Barrett, Peter Bartlett, Jim Borstelmann, Kathy Fitzgerald, Jai Rodriguez, and Cast	5:53
7.	"When You Got It, Flaunt It"	Uma Thurman	3:11
8.	"Along Came Bialy"	Nathan Lane, Eileen Essell, Debra Monk, Andrea Martin, and Cast	3:52
9.	"That Face"	Matthew Broderick and Uma Thurman	4:16
10.	"Haben Sie Gehurt Das Deutsche Band?"	Will Ferrell	1:19
11.	"You Never Say Good Luck On Opening Night"	Gary Beach, Roger Bart, Will Ferrell, Matthew Broderick, Nathan Lane, and Cast	1:34
12.	"Springtime For Hitler - Part 1"	John Barrowman, Gary Beach, Uma Thurman, Michael Thomas Holmes, Ronn Carroll, and Cast	3:40
13.	"Heil Myself"	Gary Beach	0:52
14.	"Springtime for Hitler - Part 2"	Gary Beach, Uma Thurman, and Cast	3:01
15.	"You'll Find Your Happiness In Rio"	Julio Agustin, Sebastian La Cause, J.C. Montgomery, and Chris Vasquez	1:10
16.	"Betrayed"	Nathan Lane	4:26
17.	"Til Him"	Matthew Broderick, Nathan Lane, and Cast	3:10
18.	"Prisoners Of Love (Broadway)"	Gary Beach, Uma Thurman, Nathan Lane, Matthew Broderick, Will Ferrell, Michael McKean, and Cast	2:16
19.	"Prisoners Of Love (Leo And Max)"	Matthew Broderick, Nathan Lane, and Cast	1:27
20.	"There's Nothing Like A Show On Broadway"	Mel Brooks	3:42
Total length:			1:07:15

Additional tracks: 21) "The Hop-Clop Goes On" 3:34, 22) "Goodbye!" 0:37, 23) "The King Of Broadway (Bonus Track) 4:38

== Reception ==
=== Box office ===
The film grossed $19 million at the box office in North America and another $18 million overseas, which brings the worldwide total of $38 million. The film’s failure was partly due to its competition with King Kong (another film from Universal), The Chronicles of Narnia: The Lion, the Witch and the Wardrobe, Fun with Dick and Jane, and Memoirs of a Geisha. None of this seemed to bother the film's producer Brooks, who apparently only greenlit the film so there would be some tangible record of the stage play.

=== Critical response ===
On Rotten Tomatoes, the film holds an approval rating of 51% based on 153 reviews, with an average rating of 5.4/10. The site's critical consensus reads, "Despite the rich source material, The Producers has a stale, stagy feel more suited to the theater than the big screen." On Metacritic, the film has a weighted average score of 52 out of 100, based on 36 critics, indicating "mixed or average" reviews. Audiences polled by CinemaScore gave the film an average grade of "B+" on an A+ to F scale.

A positive review from Betty Jo Tucker of Reel Talk said: "Outrageous musical numbers evoke most of the laughs in this movie funfest. Eat your heart out, Rockettes, because here comes a little old ladies' chorus line ('Along Came Bialy') to rival your success. Watch out, real-life producers, for an actor named Gary Beach ('Heil Myself'). Never, and I mean never, hire him if you want your play to flop! And stop spinning in your grave, Florenz Ziegfeld. Those 'Springtime for Hitler and Germany' showgirls are all in good fun. Finally, congratulations to director Susan Stroman, for making this Broadway gem into a film that old-time movie musical fans like me can cheer about."

Nathan Rabin wrote: "Between the rough start and an ending that lingers too long, there's a solid hour or so of terrific entertainment that serves as both a giddy tribute to Broadway musicals and a parody thereof. Thirty-seven years after Brooks declared war on taste and propriety, The Producers has lost its power to shock or offend, but it's retained its ability to amuse."

Roger Ebert cited difficulty in reviewing the film due to familiarity with the original 1967 film. However, he did state that the new version was "fun" and gave it three out of four stars. Said Ebert: "The new movie is a success, that I know. How much of a success, I cannot be sure."

In addition to these positive reviews, it was nominated for four Golden Globes (including nominations for actors Ferrell and Lane).

Most negative reviews suggested that the performances were tuned more for the theater rather than for film. Stephanie Zacharek observed: "The Producers is essentially a filmed version of a stage play, in which none of the characters' expressions or line readings have been scaled down to make sense on-screen. Every gesture is played out as if the actors were 20 feet away in real life, which means that, by the time the performers are magnified on the big screen, they're practically sitting in your lap. The effect is something like watching a 3-D IMAX film without the special glasses."

In addition to these negative reviews, it was nominated for five Stinkers Bad Movie Awards (Worst Director, Worst Remake, Worst Actor for Broderick, Least Dynamic Duo for Broderick and Lane, and Worst Song for "Keep It Gay") along with winning a special "Annie Award", which criticised the decision to sell tickets for the film for an additional $2.50; the name reflects a decision similarly used by the film Annie.

== Jimmy Kimmel Live sketch ==
On February 28, 2016, a 5-minute short film serving as a sequel to The Producers, entitled Trumped, was released on Jimmy Kimmel Live!, with Matthew Broderick and Nathan Lane reprising their roles as Leo Bloom and Max Bialystock. The film follows Bialystock & Bloom having formed their own Political Consultants business, which has since fallen on hard times. Leo realizes that under the right circumstances, more money can be made from a losing candidate than from a winner. They choose Donald Trump as a candidate, only for him to become a political phenomenon.

== See also ==
- Second weekend in box office performance § Second-weekend increase
- To Be or Not to Be (1983 film)
