= The Producers (musical) =

2001 musical written by Mel Brooks

- Original Broadway Playbill
- Music: Mel Brooks
- Lyrics: Mel Brooks
- Book: Mel Brooks; Thomas Meehan
- Basis: The Producers by Mel Brooks
- Productions: 2001 Broadway; 2002 US tour; 2003 US tour; 2004 West End; 2007 UK tour; 2015 UK and Ireland tour; 2025 West End revival; International productions
- Awards: Tony Award for Best Musical; Tony Award for Best Book; Tony Award for Best Score; Drama Desk Award for Outstanding Musical; Drama Desk Award for Outstanding Book of a Musical; Grammy Award for Best Musical Show Album; Laurence Olivier Award for Best New Musical

The Producers is a musical comedy with music and lyrics by Mel Brooks and a book by Brooks and Thomas Meehan. It is adapted from Brooks's 1967 film of the same name. The story concerns a theatrical producer and his mild-mannered accountant who scheme to get rich by fraudulently overselling interests in a Broadway musical designed to fail. Complications arise when the show is a surprise hit. The humor of The Producers draws on exaggerated accents, caricatures of Jews, gay people and Nazis, and many show business in-jokes.

After 33 previews, the original Broadway production opened at the St. James Theatre on April 19, 2001, starring Nathan Lane and Matthew Broderick, and ran for 2,502 performances, winning a record-breaking 12 Tony Awards. It spawned a successful West End production running for just over two years, national tours in the US and UK, many productions worldwide and a 2005 film version.

== Background ==
David Geffen persuaded Mel Brooks to turn his film into a stage musical. When Brooks met with Jerry Herman to discuss their working together, Herman declined, telling Brooks that he should do the job himself, as he was a good songwriter. Brooks then asked Thomas Meehan to join him in writing the book for the stage. Brooks persuaded Mike Ockrent and his wife Susan Stroman to join the creative team as director and choreographer. After Ockrent's death in 1999, Stroman agreed to continue as both director and choreographer.

== Plot ==
=== Act I ===
In New York in 1959, theatre producer Max Bialystock opens Funny Boy, a musical version of Hamlet. Reviews are overwhelmingly negative, and the show closes after one performance ("Opening Night"). Max, who was once called the King of Broadway, tells a crowd of down-and-outs of his past achievements and vows to return to form ("King of Broadway").

The next day, Leo Bloom, a mousy accountant, comes to Max's office to audit his books. When one of Max's elderly female "investors" arrives, Max tells Leo to wait in the bathroom until she leaves. She plays a sex game with Max, who persuades her to give him a check to be invested in his next play, to be called "Cash". Leo reveals his lifelong dream to be a Broadway producer. After recovering from a panic attack caused by Max touching his blue blanket, Leo tells Max that he has found an accounting error in his books: Max raised $100,000 for Funny Boy, but the play only cost $98,000. Max begs Leo to cook the books to hide the discrepancy; Leo reluctantly agrees. After some calculations, he realizes that, by bilking investors, a producer could profit more from a flop than from a hit. Inspired, Max proposes a scheme to find the worst play ever written, hire the worst director and actors in New York, raise $2 million of investment from elderly women, produce the work on Broadway, close it after one night, and escape to Rio de Janeiro with the money. However, Leo refuses to help Max with his scheme ("We Can Do It").

Leo's antagonistic boss, Mr. Marks, reprimands him for arriving at work six minutes late and calls him a nobody. While he and his miserable co-workers toil over accounts, Leo daydreams of becoming a Broadway producer ("I Wanna Be a Producer"). He realizes that his job is terrible, quits, and returns to Max ("We Can Do It" (reprise)). The next day, they search for the most offensive play they can find and discover Springtime for Hitler: A Gay Romp with Adolf and Eva at Berchtesgaden, an admiring tribute to Adolf Hitler written by ex-Nazi soldier Franz Liebkind. They go to the playwright's home in Greenwich Village to get the rights to the play, where Franz is on the roof of his tenement with his pigeons reminiscing about life back in Germany ("In Old Bavaria"). The producers get him to sign their contract by joining him in singing Hitler's favorite tune ("Der Guten Tag Hop Clop") and reciting the Siegfried Oath, under penalty of death, promising never to dishonor Hitler's spirit or memory. In doing so, Franz gives Hitler's middle name as "Elizabeth", explaining that his ancestors include "a long line of English queens".

At the townhouse of the flamboyant transvestite and failing director Roger De Bris, Roger and his domestic partner Carmen Ghia initially decline the offer to direct because of the serious subject matter. After much persuading and invoking the possibility of a Tony Award, Roger relents and tells the producers that the second act must be rewritten so the Germans win World War II while also insisting that the play be more "gay" ("Keep It Gay"). Max and Leo return to the office to meet Ulla, a beautiful Swedish woman who wants to audition for their next play ("When You've Got It, Flaunt It"). The producers are impressed, mostly by her sex-appeal, and hire her as a clerical worker. Max leaves to raise $2 million to produce Springtime for Hitler by calling on elderly women from all over New York ("Along Came Bialy"), and succeeds at raising the money ("Act I Finale").

=== Act II ===
Leo and Ulla are left alone in Max's office, which she has "redecorated", and they start to fall in love ("That Face"). Max walks in and sees the tempting form of Ulla's covered behind ("That Face" (reprise)).

At the auditions for the role of Hitler, Roger rejects one actor after another in summary fashion. Finally, a frustrated Franz performs his own jazzy rendition of "Haben Sie Gehört Das Deutsche Band?", at the end of which Max approves Franz's audition. Opening night arrives ("Opening Night" (reprise)), and after Leo curses the production by wishing everyone "good luck" rather than the traditional "break a leg" ("You Never Say 'Good Luck' on Opening Night"), Franz literally breaks his leg falling down the stairs. Roger is the only one other than Franz who knows the part of Hitler, and he rushes to the dressing room to get ready. The curtain rises, and Max and Leo watch the opening number ("Springtime for Hitler"), which shocks the audience, before sneaking away. Unfortunately, Roger plays Hitler so flamboyantly that the audience mistakes the show for satire, and it becomes a surprise smash.

Back at the office, Max and Leo are horrified that the IRS will learn of their actions as they read positive critical reviews for Springtime ("Where Did We Go Right?"). Roger and Carmen come to congratulate them, only to find them fighting over the accounting books. Franz bursts in, waving a pistol, outraged by Roger's portrayal of Hitler. Fearful for his life, Max suggests that Franz shoot the actors instead of the producers as a way to close the show. The police are summoned by the commotion and arrest Franz, who breaks his other leg while trying to escape. They also arrest Max and take the books. As Leo hides, Ulla finds him and persuades him to take the $2 million and run off to Rio with her.

In jail awaiting trial, Max receives a postcard from Leo, now living in Rio and having eloped with Ulla. Feeling betrayed, he recounts the events of the story ("Betrayed"). At his trial, Max is found "incredibly guilty", but Leo and Ulla arrive in the nick of time. Leo turns in the stolen money and tells the judge that Max is a good man who has never hurt anyone despite his swindling, and the only man he has ever called a friend ("'Til Him"). Touched by their friendship, the judge decides not to separate the partners, sending them and Franz to Sing Sing prison together for five years. In prison, they write a new musical entitled "Prisoners of Love", and they are pardoned by the governor of New York for bringing joy into the lives of their inmates by having them act in the show. Soon after taking Prisoners of Love to Broadway, with Roger and Ulla in the main roles, Leo and Max become successful producers and walk off into the sunset ("Leo & Max"). Everyone comes back for one last song, telling the audience to leave ("Goodbye!").

== Musical numbers ==
Act I

- Overture – Orchestra
- "Opening Night" – Usherettes and Company
- "The King of Broadway" – Max and Company
- "We Can Do It" – Max and Leo
- "I Wanna Be a Producer" – Leo, Showgirls and Accountants
- "We Can Do It" (reprise) – Leo and Max
- "In Old Bavaria" – Franz
- "Der Guten Tag Hop-Clop" – Franz, Leo and Max
- "Keep It Gay" – Roger, Carmen, Max, Leo, Brian, Kevin, Scott, Shirley
- "When You Got It, Flaunt It" – Ulla
- "Along Came Bialy" – Max and Company
- "Act I Finale" – Max, Leo, Ulla, Franz, Roger, Carmen, Brian, Kevin, Scott, Shirley, and Company

Act II

- Entr'acte
- "That Face" – Leo, Ulla and Max
- "Haben Sie Gehört Das Deutsche Band?" (Note: Translates to "Have You Heard The German Band?") – Franz and Max
- "Opening Night" (reprise) – Usherettes
- "You Never Say 'Good Luck' on Opening Night" – Roger, Carmen, Franz, Leo and Max
- "Springtime for Hitler" – Lead Tenor Stormtrooper, Ulla, Roger and Company
- "Where Did We Go Right?" – Leo and Max
- "Betrayed" – Max
- "'Til Him" – Leo, Max and Little Old Ladies
- "Prisoners of Love" – Convicts
- "Prisoners of Love" (reprise) – Roger, Ulla and Company
- "Leo and Max" – Max and Leo
- "Goodbye!" – Company

== Notable casts ==
Character	Broadway	U.S. tour	U.S. tour	West End	UK tour	UK tour	West End revival
Character	2001	2002	2003	2004	2007	2015	2025
Max Bialystock	Nathan Lane	Lewis J. Stadlen	Brad Oscar	Nathan Lane	Cory English	Cory English	Andy Nyman
Leopold "Leo" Bloom	Matthew Broderick	Don Stephenson	Andy Taylor	Lee Evans	John Gordon Sinclair	Jason Manford	Marc Antolin
Ulla Bloom	Cady Huffman	Angie Schworer	Ida Leigh Curtis	Leigh Zimmerman	Emma-Jayne Appleyard	Tiffany Graves	Joanna Woodward
Roger De Bris	Gary Beach	Lee Roy Reams	Lee Roy Reams	Conleth Hill	Peter Kay	David Bedella	Trevor Ashley
Carmen Ghia	Roger Bart	Jeff Hyslop	Rich Affannato	James Dreyfus	Robert Sebastian	Louie Spence	Raj Ghatak
Franz Liebkind	Brad Oscar	Fred Applegate	Bill Nolte	Nicolas Colicos	Alex Giannini	Phill Jupitus	Harry Morrison

=== Notable replacements ===
==== Broadway (2001–2007) ====
- Leo: Steven Weber, Roger Bart, Don Stephenson, Hunter Foster, Alan Ruck
- Max: Henry Goodman, Brad Oscar, Lewis J. Stadlen, Fred Applegate, John Treacy Egan, Richard Kind, Tony Danza
- Ulla: Sarah Cornell, Angie Schworer
- Roger: John Treacy Egan, Jonathan Freeman, Lee Roy Reams
- Carmen: Sam Harris, Brooks Ashmanskas, Jai Rodriguez
- Franz: John Treacy Egan, Bill Nolte

==== West End (2004–2007) ====
- Leo: John Gordon Sinclair, Reece Shearsmith
- Max: Brad Oscar, Fred Applegate, Cory English

==== West End (2025–2026) ====
- Max: Richard Kind

== Productions ==
=== Chicago tryout and Broadway (2001–2007) ===
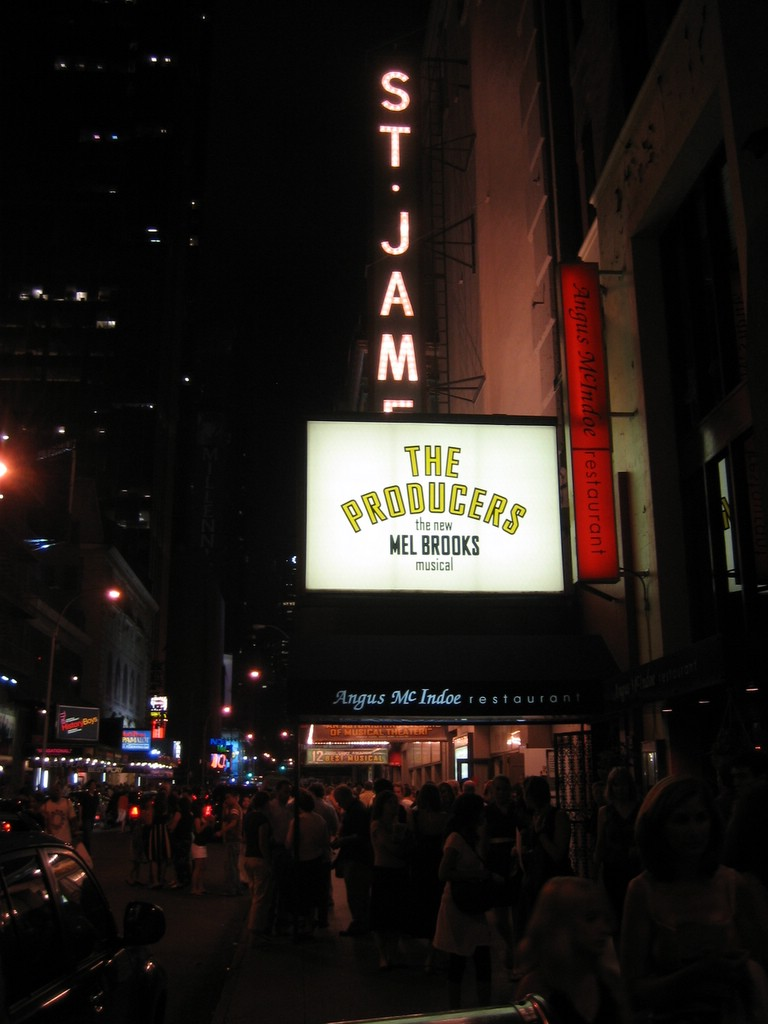
The Producers at the St. James Theatre

The Producers had a pre-Broadway tryout at Chicago's Cadillac Palace from February 1 to 25, 2001, starring Matthew Broderick as Leo Bloom and Nathan Lane as Max Bialystock.

The production opened on Broadway with the same cast at the St. James Theatre on April 19, 2001. It ran for 2,502 performances, closing on April 22, 2007. The director and choreographer was Susan Stroman. Glen Kelly was the musical arranger and supervisor. The production won 12 Tony Awards, breaking the record held for 37 years by Hello, Dolly! which had won 10.

After the opening, The Producers broke the record for the largest single day box-office ticket sales in theatre history, taking in more than $3 million. The departure of the original stars later in the run had a detrimental effect on the success of the production, prompting the return of Broderick and Lane for a limited run from December 2003 to April 2004. The show's sales then broke its own record with over $3.5 million in single day ticket sales.

=== US tours (2002–2005) ===
From September 2002 to July 2005, there were two touring companies that played 74 cities across the United States, grossing over $214 million. The first tour began on September 10, 2002, and starred Don Stephenson as Leo and Lewis J. Stadlen as Max. They were replaced during the Los Angeles engagement in 2003 by Martin Short and Jason Alexander for the duration of the show's run in that city, as well as in San Francisco. Michael Kostroff, who had several supporting roles in that production and understudied Max, published a 2005 memoir of his touring experience, Letters from Backstage.

Another national tour opened on June 17, 2003, at the Colonial Theatre in Boston, Massachusetts, starring Andy Taylor as Leo and Brad Oscar as Max. The cast also featured Lee Roy Reams as Roger and Bill Nolte as Franz. This company toured the US for two years before playing in Tokyo, Japan.

=== Toronto (2003–2004) ===
A Toronto production opened in December 2003 and closed in July 2004 at The Canon Theatre. The cast included Michael Therriault and Seán Cullen as Leo and Max, Juan Chioran as Roger, Paul O'Sullivan as Franz, Sarah Cornell as Ulla and Brandon McGibbon as Carmen Ghia. Stroman also directed and choreographed this production with the same designers as the Broadway production.

=== West End (2004–2007) ===
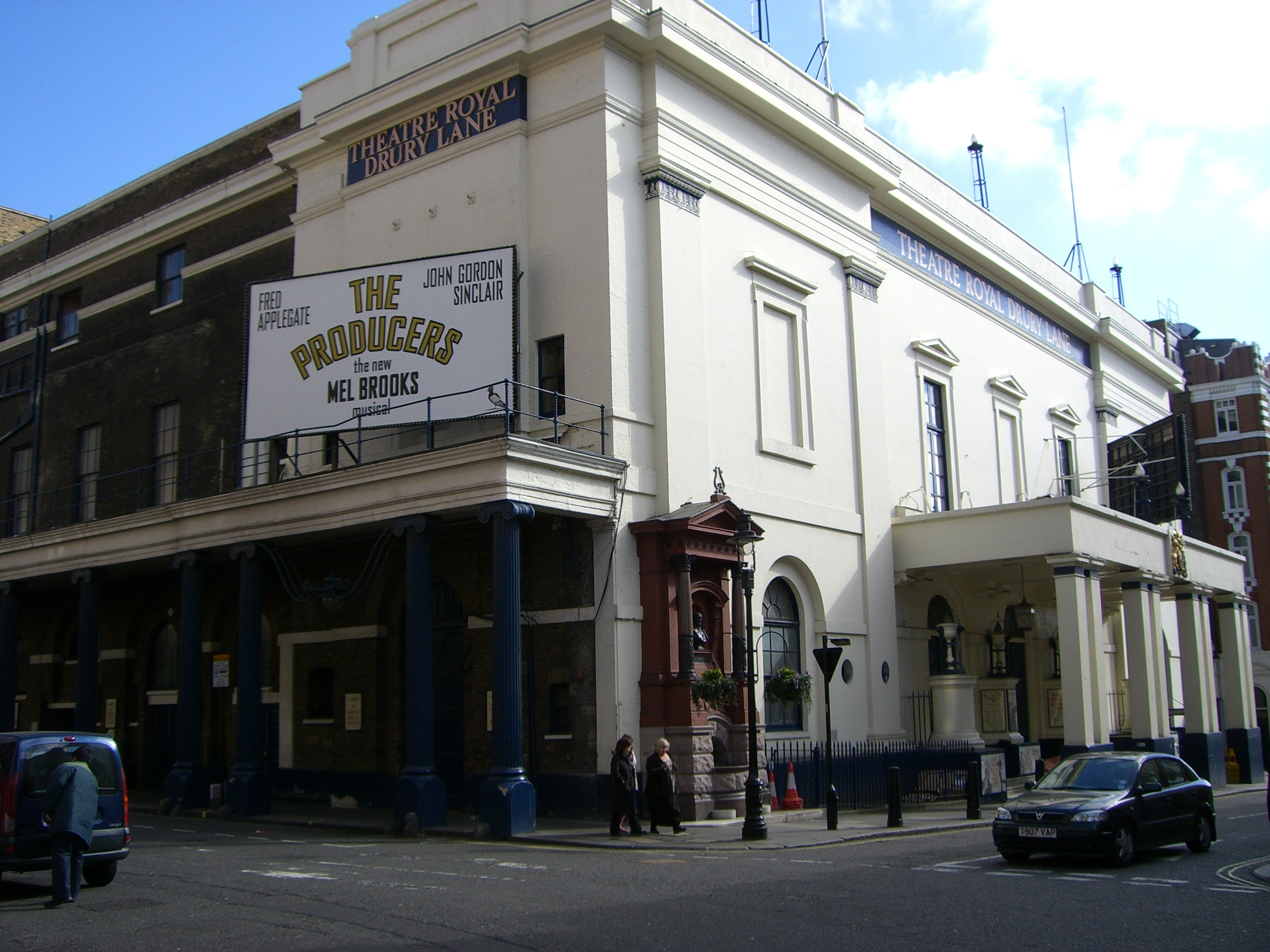
The Producers at Theatre Royal, Drury Lane

The Producers opened in London's West End at the Theatre Royal, Drury Lane, on November 9, 2004 and closed on January 6, 2007, after 920 performances. The production starred Nathan Lane, reprising the role of Max after Richard Dreyfuss was "let go" by the producers after finding that he was unable "to fulfil the rigours of the role", with four days to go before first previews. Lee Evans played Leo (Lane and Evans had worked together in the 1997 movie MouseHunt), with Leigh Zimmerman as Ulla, Nicolas Colicos as Franz Liebkind, Conleth Hill as Roger De Bris, and James Dreyfus as Carmen Ghia.

The show enjoyed excellent box office success as it had in New York. Despite the departure of Lane from the show, it continued to enjoy strong sales. Leo Bloom was later played by John Gordon Sinclair and Reece Shearsmith. Max Bialystock was then played by Brad Oscar, Fred Applegate, and Cory English.

=== UK tours (2007–2015) ===
A United Kingdom tour opened in Manchester on February 19, 2007, where it played for three months before moving on. English and Sinclair reprised their roles of Max and Leo, respectively, and Peter Kay was cast in the role of Roger. For the majority of the tour, which ran until early 2008, Joe Pasquale and Reece Shearsmith took over the role of Leo and Russ Abbot played Roger.

A new production began a UK and Ireland tour at the Churchill Theatre in Bromley on March 6, 2015, starring Cory English as Max, Jason Manford as Leo, Phill Jupitus (until May 16) and Ross Noble (from May 18 onwards) as Franz Liebkind, David Bedella as Roger De Bris and Louie Spence as Carmen Ghia (until May 2). The tour continued until July 2015 in Dublin.

=== West End revival (2025–2026) ===
An Off West End revival at the Menier Chocolate Factory, London, directed by Patrick Marber, began previews on November 26, 2024, with an opening night on December 9, and ran until March 1, 2025. Andy Nyman starred as Max, with Marc Antolin as Leo, Trevor Ashley as Roger, Raj Ghatak as Carmen, and Joanna Woodward as Ulla. Choreography was by Lorin Latarro.

The production transferred to the Garrick Theatre for a West End run with the same principal cast. The production began previews on August 30, 2025, with an opening on September 15. Kind replaced Nyman as Max in 2026. The production closed on September 19, 2026.

=== Other productions ===
A Los Angeles, California, production ran from May 2003 to January 2004 at the Pantages Theatre. Co-starring were Jason Alexander as Max Bialystock and Martin Short as Leo Bloom. The Las Vegas, Nevada production ran from 2007 to 2008 at the Paris Hotel & Casino. It starred Brad Oscar as Bialystock, Larry Raben as Bloom and Leigh Zimmerman as Ulla, with David Hasselhoff receiving top billing as Roger De Bris. Once Hasselhoff left the production, top-billing went to Tony Danza, who stepped in as Bialystock. The production was a 90-minute version. In 2007, the first U.S. regional theater production played in Lincolnshire, Illinois at the Marriott Theatre from September to November 2007 and starred Ross Lehman as Bialystock and Guy Adkins as Bloom.

In 2009, the show played at the Walnut Street Theatre in Philadelphia, Pennsylvania and at the Diablo Light Opera Company in California, starring Ginny Wehrmeister as Ulla, Ryan Drummond as Leo, and Marcus Klinger as Max. This production received the 2009 Shellie Award for Best Production. Oscar and Bart reprised their roles as Max and Leo, respectively, in a production at Starlight Theatre in Kansas City, Missouri in August 2010. A production at the Hollywood Bowl, with Kind, Bart, and Gary Beach reprising their roles as Max, Carmen and Roger, ran July 27–29, 2012. The cast also starred Jesse Tyler Ferguson as Leo Bloom and featured Dane Cook as Franz Liebkind and Rebecca Romijn as Ulla.

The Producers has been presented professionally in cities around the world, including Toronto, Berlin, Breda, Melbourne, Brisbane, Cairns, Sydney, Christchurch, Tel Aviv, Seoul, Buenos Aires, Tokyo, Osaka, Nagoya, Copenhagen, Milan, Budapest, Madrid, Halifax, Manchester, Mexico City, Prague, Stockholm, Panama, Bratislava, Vienna, Helsinki, Athens, Rio de Janeiro, São Paulo, Caracas, Lisbon, Gothenburg, Oslo, Oradea, Paris, Varde, Moscow, Ghent, Manila, and Belgrade.

== Adaptations ==
In 2005, the musical was adapted into a musical film. It was directed by Stroman and starred most of the original Broadway cast, except for Brad Oscar – who was unable to reprise the role of Franz because he had signed on to play Max on Broadway and, instead, had a brief cameo as the cab driver – and Cady Huffman. Their roles were played by Will Ferrell and Uma Thurman, respectively. The songs "King of Broadway", "In Old Bavaria", and "Where Did We Go Right?" were not in the theatrical release of the film but were included in the extended cut; "King of Broadway" and "In Old Bavaria" appear on the DVD as deleted scenes. The movie opened on December 16, 2005, and received mixed reviews.

== In popular culture ==
The fourth season of the TV series Curb Your Enthusiasm, parodies The Producers in the form of a metareference. Mel Brooks offers Larry David the part of Max, with Ben Stiller as Leo. When Larry and Stiller have a falling out, Stiller is replaced by David Schwimmer. On opening night, Larry forgets his lines, but instead of causing the play to bomb, his ad-libs keep the audience laughing. Brooks reveals he purposely cast Larry, believing he would fail, to end the show and "free" Brooks of its success. Brooks and his real-life wife, Anne Bancroft, laugh at Larry's performance, but to their dismay, Larry makes the play a hit once again. Huffman and Lane appear as themselves.

== Awards and nominations ==
At the 2001 Tony Awards, The Producers won 12 out of its 15 nominations, breaking the record of 10 wins set by Hello, Dolly! in 1964. It was one of the few musicals to win in every category for which it was nominated, receiving two nominations for leading actor and three for featured actor. Its record for most nominations was tied in 2009 by Billy Elliot the Musical and broken in 2016 when Hamilton received 16 nominations, but its record number of wins still stands, as of 2026; Hamilton is second, with 11 wins.

=== Original Broadway production ===
Year	Award ceremony	Category	Nominee	Result
2001	Tony Award	Best Musical		Won
2001	Tony Award	Best Book of a Musical	Mel Brooks and Thomas Meehan	Won
2001	Tony Award	Best Original Score	Mel Brooks	Won
2001	Tony Award	Best Actor in a Musical	Nathan Lane	Won
2001	Tony Award	Best Actor in a Musical	Matthew Broderick	Nominated
2001	Tony Award	Best Featured Actor in a Musical	Gary Beach	Won
2001	Tony Award	Best Featured Actor in a Musical	Roger Bart	Nominated
2001	Tony Award	Best Featured Actor in a Musical	Brad Oscar	Nominated
2001	Tony Award	Best Featured Actress in a Musical	Cady Huffman	Won
2001	Tony Award	Best Direction of a Musical	Susan Stroman	Won
2001	Tony Award	Best Choreography	Susan Stroman	Won
2001	Tony Award	Best Orchestrations	Doug Besterman	Won
2001	Tony Award	Best Scenic Design	Robin Wagner	Won
2001	Tony Award	Best Costume Design	William Ivey Long	Won
2001	Tony Award	Best Lighting Design	Peter Kaczorowski	Won
2001	Drama Desk Award	Outstanding Musical		Won
2001	Drama Desk Award	Outstanding Book of a Musical	Mel Brooks and Thomas Meehan	Won
2001	Drama Desk Award	Outstanding Actor in a Musical	Nathan Lane	Won
2001	Drama Desk Award	Outstanding Actor in a Musical	Matthew Broderick	Nominated
2001	Drama Desk Award	Outstanding Featured Actor in a Musical	Gary Beach	Won
2001	Drama Desk Award	Outstanding Featured Actor in a Musical	Roger Bart	Nominated
2001	Drama Desk Award	Outstanding Featured Actress in a Musical	Cady Huffman	Won
2001	Drama Desk Award	Outstanding Director of a Musical	Susan Stroman	Won
2001	Drama Desk Award	Outstanding Choreography	Susan Stroman	Won
2001	Drama Desk Award	Outstanding Orchestrations	Doug Besterman	Won
2001	Drama Desk Award	Outstanding Lyrics	Mel Brooks	Won
2001	Drama Desk Award	Outstanding Set Design	Robin Wagner	Won
2001	Drama Desk Award	Outstanding Costume Design	William Ivey Long	Won
2001	Drama Desk Award	Outstanding Lighting Design	Peter Kaczorowski	Nominated
2001	New York Drama Critics' Circle Award	Best Musical		Won
2002	Grammy Award	Grammy Award for Best Musical Show Album		Won

=== Original London production ===
Year	Award ceremony	Category	Nominee	Result
2005	Laurence Olivier Award	Best New Musical		Won
2005	Laurence Olivier Award	Best Actor in a Musical	Nathan Lane	Won
2005	Laurence Olivier Award	Best Actor in a Musical	Lee Evans	Nominated
2005	Laurence Olivier Award	Best Actress in a Musical	Leigh Zimmerman	Nominated
2005	Laurence Olivier Award	Best Performance in a Supporting Role in a Musical	Conleth Hill	Won
2005	Laurence Olivier Award	Best Director	Susan Stroman	Nominated
2005	Laurence Olivier Award	Best Theatre Choreographer	Susan Stroman	Nominated
2005	Laurence Olivier Award	Best Costume Design	William Ivey Long	Nominated

=== 2025 London revival ===
Year	Award ceremony	Category	Nominee	Result
2026	Laurence Olivier Award	Best Musical Revival		Nominated
2026	Laurence Olivier Award	Best Actor in a Musical	Marc Antolin	Nominated
2026	Laurence Olivier Award	Best Actor in a Musical	Andy Nyman	Nominated
2026	Laurence Olivier Award	Best Supporting Actor in a Musical	Trevor Ashley	Nominated
