= Gary Beach =

American actor (1947–2018)

- Born: October 10, 1947; Alexandria, Virginia, U.S.
- Died: July 17, 2018 (aged 70); Palm Springs, California, U.S.
- Education: Old Dominion University; University of North Carolina School of the Arts (BFA)
- Occupation: Actor
- Years active: 1969–2018
- Spouse: Jeffrey Barnett
- Awards: Tony Award for Best Performance by a Featured Actor in a Musical; 2001 The Producers

Gary Beach (October 10, 1947 – July 17, 2018) was an American actor of stage, film and television. He portrayed Roger De Bris in both the stage and film productions of The Producers, for which he won a Tony Award; he received a Tony nomination for his portrayal of Lumiere in the stage musical version of Disney's Beauty and the Beast.

== Early life ==
Beach was born in Alexandria, Virginia, and graduated from Groveton High School. He went on to graduate from the North Carolina School of the Arts, the same school as his Beauty and the Beast co-star Terrence Mann.

== Career ==
Beach's television credits included both the 2003 and 2009 Kennedy Center Honors, Queer as Folk, Murder, She Wrote, Cheers, Sisters, Arli$$, and Saved by the Bell, as well as "Recording the Producers", a documentary for PBS. Beach also lent his voice to Fox's Family Guy in the now infamous banned-from-television episode "Partial Terms of Endearment" (available on DVD).

In 1994, Beach originated the comical role of Lumiere in Beauty and the Beast, a performance that earned him a Tony Award nomination for Best Featured Actor in a Musical. In 2001, he originated the stage role of Roger DeBris in The Producers for which he won the Tony Award for Featured Actor in a Musical. In 2004, he starred as Albin in the Broadway revival of La Cage aux Folles, earning him his third Tony nomination, this time for Leading Actor. After starring in the 2005 film version of The Producers, Beach returned to his stage role as Roger DeBris while the movie was in release, becoming the first artist to play the same part on Broadway and in movie theaters at the same time. In 2006, Beach played the role of Thénardier in the Broadway revival of Les Misérables, a role he had originated in the Los Angeles production. Previously, he performed in the chorus for the 1989 Les Misérables: Complete Symphonic Recording. In March 2008, Beach joined the United States national tour cast of Monty Python's Spamalot in the lead role of King Arthur.

Beach's other Broadway credits included Annie, Doonesbury, The Moony Shapiro Songbook, Broadway Bash, Sweet Adeline (Encores), Something's Afoot and 1776. He toured nationally with the James Kirkwood comedy Legends! starring Mary Martin and Carol Channing. In addition to his Broadway credits, Beach was well known for his Summer stock theatre performances. In later years he frequently returned to Sacramento as a Music Circus favorite in shows such as Guys and Dolls, A Funny Thing Happened On The Way To The Forum and Spamalot.

== Personal life and death ==
Beach and his husband, Jeffrey Barnett, resided in Palm Springs, California where Beach died on July 17, 2018, at the age of 70. On July 20, 2018 at 6:45 pm, Disney presented a tribute to Beach on the marquee of the New Amsterdam Theatre.

== Awards and nominations ==
Year	Award	Category	Work	Result
1994	Tony Award	Best Featured Actor in a Musical	Beauty and the Beast	Nominated
2001	Tony Award	Best Featured Actor in a Musical	The Producers	Won
2001	Drama Desk Award	Outstanding Featured Actor in a Musical	The Producers	Won
2001	Outer Critics Circle Award	Outstanding Featured Actor in a Musical	The Producers	Won
2004	Tony Award	Best Actor in a Musical	La Cage aux Folles	Nominated

== Stage productions ==
- 1776 (1969–1972) – Dr. Josiah Bartlett / Edward Rutledge
- Something's Afoot (1976) – Nigel Rancour
- Annie (1977–1983) – Rooster Hannigan
- The Moony Shapiro Songbook (1981) – Performer
- Doonesbury: A Musical Comedy (1983) – Duke
- Beauty and the Beast (1994) – Lumiere
- The Producers (2001) – Roger De Bris
- Funny Girl (benefit concert) (2002) – Tom Keeney
- La Cage aux Folles (revival) (2004) – Albin Mougeotte
- Les Misérables (revival) (2006–2008) – Thénardier

National tours

- 1776 – Dr. Josiah Bartlett / Edward Rutledge
- Annie – Rooster Hannigan
- A Christmas Carol – Fred Anderson
- Legends! – Martin Klemmer
- Les Misérables – Thénardier
- Beauty and the Beast – Lumiere
- The Producers – Roger De Bris
- Spamalot – King Arthur
