= Saint Thomas Aquinas High School (Kansas) =

Catholic High school in Overland Park, Kansas

Location
- 11411 Pflumm Road; Overland Park, Kansas 66215; United States; 38°55′20″N 94°44′24″W

Information
- Former names: Aquinas H.S. (1980-88), St. Joseph H.S. (1931-1980)
- Type: Private, Coeducational
- Motto: Latin: Amor Vincit Omnia (Love Conquers All)
- Religious affiliation: Roman Catholic
- Established: 1988 (1931)
- School district: Archdiocese of Kansas City in Kansas
- President: Brian Schenck
- Principal: Craig Moss
- Chaplain: Father Aaron Waldeck
- Faculty: 76 full, 4 part-time
- Grades: 9-12
- Enrollment: approx. 875
- Student to teacher ratio: approx. 11:1
- Colors: Navy Blue and Old Gold
- Athletics conference: Eastern Kansas League
- Nickname: The Saints
- Accreditation: Lumen Accreditation
- Newspaper: The Shield
- Yearbook: Medallion
- Website: stasaints.net

Saint Thomas Aquinas High School is a private, coed, Catholic high school in Overland Park, Kansas, United States, serving 875 (approx.) students in grades 9-12. It is located in the Roman Catholic Archdiocese of Kansas City in Kansas. It features a college preparatory curriculum, with paths for business, nursing, and engineering, as well as a comprehensive selection of Advanced Placement® courses and other college credit courses through partnerships with area institutions, including Rockhurst University.

Saint Thomas Aquinas is one of several private high schools located in the Kansas City Metropolitan Area, and one of three Catholic high schools in Johnson County, Kansas. The school colors are navy blue and old gold.

The school was established in its current location in 1988 to accommodate the growing Roman Catholic population in south Johnson County. It is the successor to St. Joseph/Aquinas High School, which was located in the present-day Early Education Center on the campus of St. Joseph Catholic Church in Shawnee, Kansas.

Saint Thomas Aquinas H.S. is a member of the Kansas State High School Activities Association and offers a variety of sports programs. Athletic teams currently compete in the 5A division (Football competed in 4A for the 2022 and 2023 seasons and again in the 2026 and 2027 seasons) and are known as the "Saints". Extracurricular activities are also offered in the form of performing arts, student media, student council, clubs, and club sports.

== History ==
=== St. Joseph and Aquinas High School ===
St. Joseph High School opened in 1931 (first graduating class in 1934) as a co-educational parish high school for St. Joseph Roman Catholic parish in Shawnee, Kansas. In 1980, responsibility for the high school was expanded from just St. Joseph parish to the entire Archdiocese of Kansas City in Kansas. To reflect this, the name was changed to "Aquinas High School," after Thomas Aquinas, patron saint of Catholic schools. The mascot/athletic nickname of Aquinas and St. Joseph was the "Blue Streaks." The Shawnee campus could accommodate about two hundred students.

=== Saint Thomas Aquinas High School ===
The Archdiocese takeover included plans to open a new larger building on land adjacent to Johnson County Community College in Overland Park, about 6.5 miles south and one mile west of the Shawnee campus. The new building, which could accommodate more than one thousand students, was open for the 1988-89 school year. The school's name was expanded from "Aquinas High School" to "Saint Thomas Aquinas High School" at the new building, as well as a new athletic nickname and mascot: the "Saints."

The Shawnee high school campus was returned to St. Joseph parish, which uses the gymnasium and stadium for its primary school and for CYO competitions. The parish operates the St. Joseph Early Education Center in other parts of the building.

==== Building expansions ====
Major expansions to the current campus began after only three years, in 1991, with the addition of a stadium, theater and performing arts wing, air conditioning in classrooms, and a second classroom building. The second building, with its ten new classrooms and large office space, was originally referred to as "SMC" because it housed the Johnson County offices of Saint Mary College, which held classes in the building at night.

An "Auxiliary Gym" was added to the main building, in 2002, to allow more athletic practices and events to occur simultaneously.

In 2012, major improvements to the stadium were completed. The field was converted from natural turf to synthetic turf, with permanent field lines for both soccer and football, and a new visitor seating section was added to accommodate more than 1000 additional spectators.

In 2017, the new "Innovation Lab" maker-space and Engineering classroom and an adjacent hallway attaching the former SMC building to the main building were added. Administration and counseling offices moved over to the offices in the former St. Mary's space, making room for new classrooms in the main building. Safety and comfort were improved, as one no longer needed to go outside to get to these classrooms and offices.

Also built in 2017 were a new strength and training facility, and better access to the Auxiliary Gym via a new hallway.

The school alumni successfully undertook an ambitious effort to raise $500,000 to replace the stadium field's turf, in 2022-23.

In 2024, the school debuted its first track on campus, surrounding a second artificial turf field. They also expanded the school building, creating a 2D Art classroom, a 3D Art classroom, a Band classroom, a Speech & Drama classroom, Theater dressing rooms, and a large multipurpose room. This expansion allowed transformation of existing spaces into a new Health Sciences Lab, a Presentation Room, a Theater Green Room, and a maintenance storage & office space.

==== Administration ====
The current chaplain is Fr. Aaron Waldeck; the president is Brian Schenck, and the principal is Craig Moss; assistant principals are Kara DiCarlo and Lori Greeson.

== Academics ==
In 2012, Saint Thomas Aquinas was awarded the Blue Ribbon Award for excellence in education by the US Department of Education.

For the 2008–09 and 2009-2010 school years, Saint Thomas Aquinas was recognized by the Kansas State Board of Education for achieving excellence in reading, writing and mathematics.

Beginning in 2011, 27 credits are now required for graduation.

In 2024, to coincide with new academic spaces, Saint Thomas Aquinas adjusted graduation requirements to allow students more opportunities to take additional Health Sciences (Nursing, OT, etc), Business, and STEM classes.

== Extracurricular activities ==
=== Non-athletic programs ===
==== Choir Program ====
Saint Thomas Aquinas has a total of four choirs. The Swingin' Saints (Mixed Show Choir), Saintsations (Girls Show Choir), Concert choir, and Chamber choir. Concert and Chamber choirs have received multiple "One" ratings at the KSHSAA Large Group Contest. The two show choirs compete in Kansas, Missouri, Iowa, and Nebraska.

In 2025, The Swingin' Saints were the Grand Champions of the Webb City Showcase.

==== Debate/Forensics ====
The school offers debate and forensics programs for students. The Saints debate team won KSHSAA state championships in 2006, 2008 and 2011.

=== Athletics ===
Saint Thomas Aquinas athletic teams are known as the Saints. They compete in the Eastern Kansas League (EKL), and are members of the Kansas State High School Activities Association (KSHSAA). The Saints are, in 2026-27, classified by KSHSAA as a 5A school. The EKL consists of 4A, 5A, and 6A schools.

The Saints have won two National Championships (Boys Soccer, 1994 and 2009), 138 KSHSAA State Championships (From Fall 1988 to Fall 2025), more than 56 State Championship Runners-up, and more than 265 League, District, Regional, and Sub-State Championships. That includes a record eight KSHSAA State championships during the 2006–2007 school year.

There are more than 250 Saints who are State Champions in Individual, Duo, or "4x" events.

==== Soccer ====
The Saints have won a combined 36 State Championships in Boys and Girls Soccer, which includes eight straight State titles for boys from 2003 to 2010 and seven straight state titles for the girls from 2010 to 2016. Additionally, the boys' team won National Championships in 1994 and 2009 according to the National Soccer Coaches Association of America. After winning the National Championship in 2009, then head coach Craig Ewing was honored as the national boys coach of the year for private and parochial schools by the NSCAA. Ewing had twice previously been selected as the NSCAA's girls soccer coach of the year. Coach Ewing, with his combines 33 Kansas State Titles and more than 1000 victories, was inducted into the United Soccer Coaches (formerly NSCAA) Hall of Fame in January 2026.

==== Cross Country ====
The Saints Girls Cross Country team repeated as State Champs in 2009.

The Saints Cross Country program has been a state championship contender since its very first season. The girls team placed second at the 1988 4A championship and second in 5A in 1991.

During the 2000, 2001, and 2002 seasons, The Saints competed in the 6A division (the largest class in KSHSAA). In 2002, Saints Boys Cross Country placed 3rd at the 6A state championship, but the team would have been the state champions had they been in the 5A division. The Saints returned to competing the 5A division the following season.

In 2006, both teams won the state title. The Saints have repeated the state sweep in 2008, 2014, 2015, 2016 and 2018.

The 2013 Saints girls team set an unbreakable record at the championship with a perfect score of 15 as all five Saints runners finished in the top five spots.

In 2015 the boys set the state meet record with a score of 22 points. Saints runners took the top four spots.

The Saints boys won seven straight state titles from 2014 to 2020, and the girls won six state titles from 2012 to 2016 and in 2018.

==== Golf ====
The Saints girls Golf team were the first Saints to win a KSHSAA championship, in the fall of 1992. They won again in 1996 and 1997. The Saints won in 2002, placed second in 2003 and 2004, then won six consecutive championships from 2007 to 2012 and have had multiple individual champions as well. The girls golf team won the school's 100th state championship in 2017, then repeated in 2018.

The boys' golf team placed second seven times from 1995 to 2006. The Saints finally won in 2007, repeated in 2008, won again in 2011, 2016, 2017 and has also produced individual state champions.

==== Football ====
Saint Thomas Aquinas' head football coach is Randy Dreiling, who came to the Saints in 2013 after successfully coaching the Hutchinson High School Salthawks. Saints Football won Kansas State Championships in 2018, 2023, and 2024. On October 2nd, 2026, the Saints beat Blue Valley High School, securing Dreiling's 300th career victory.

==== State championships ====
State Championships
Season	Sport	Titles	Years won
Fall	Boys soccer	17	1992, 1993, 1994, 1995, 1996, 1999, 2003, 2004, 2005, 2006, 2007, 2008, 2009, 2010, 2013, 2014, 2020
Fall	Boys cross country	12	1994, 1996, 2006, 2008, 2014, 2015, 2016, 2017, 2018, 2019, 2020, 2021
Fall	Girls cross country	10	2004, 2006, 2008, 2009, 2012, 2013, 2014, 2015, 2016, 2018
Fall	Girls golf	13	1992, 1996, 1997, 2002, 2007, 2008, 2009, 2010, 2011, 2012, 2017, 2018, 2019
Fall	Girls volleyball	10	1995, 2001, 2006, 2007, 2014, 2019, 2020, 2022, 2024, 2025
Fall	Football	3	2018, 2023, 2024
Fall	Girls tennis	2	2008, 2009
Fall	Cheer	4	2022, 2023, 2024, 2025
Winter	Wrestling	2	2005, 2007
Winter	Girls basketball	12*	2001, 2004, 2011, 2013, 2016, 2017, 2018, 2019, 2020*, 2021, 2022, 2023, 2025
Winter	Debate	3	2006, 2008, 2011
Winter	Scholars Bowl	2	1992, 2003
Spring	Boys golf	6	2007, 2008, 2011, 2016, 2017, 2018
Spring	Girls soccer	20	1993, 1994, 1995, 1996, 1999, 2000, 2005, 2006, 2007, 2010, 2011, 2012, 2013, 2014, 2015, 2016, 2021, 2022, 2023, 2024
Spring	Boys track and field	3	2003, 2016, 2017
Spring	Girls track and field	5	2006, 2008, 2012, 2014, 2021
Spring	Baseball	5	2007, 2014, 2016, 2024, 2025
Spring	Softball	3	1997, 2008, 2025
Spring	Boys tennis	2	2011, 2012
Spring	Girls swimming and diving	2	2010, 2018
Spring	Forensics	1	2006
Total		138	

- * There was no Kansas Girls Basketball 5A State Champion in 2020. The 2020 KSHSAA Basketball State Championship tournaments were canceled due to the COVID-19 pandemic before the semifinals could take place. The Saints were among the Girls 5A final four teams.

== Exchange programs ==
The school has an exchange program with Yonago High School in Yonago, Japan.

== Notable alumni ==
- Angelo Allegri, professional basketball player
- Janine DiVita, Broadway theatre and screen actress
- Drake Dunsmore, former professional football player in the National Football League
- Lisa Kerney, professional sports broadcaster/anchor for ESPN
- Kyle Miller, professional Major League Soccer player
- Ryan Mueller, former professional football player in the National Football League
- Riley Pint, professional Major League Baseball player
- Angel Reda, Broadway theatre and screen actress
- Brian Smith, former NFL player
- Michael Thomas, professional Major League Soccer player
