= Rovshan =

Rovshan (Azerbaijani: Rövşən) is a given name. Notable people with the name include:

- Rovshan Abdullaoglu (born 1978), Azerbaijani writer, philosopher, psychologist
- Rovshan Bayramov — is an Azerbaijani wrestler.
- Rovshan Huseynov — was an Azerbaijani amateur boxer.
- Rovshan Javadov — was an officer in the Azerbaijani Armed Forces and the chief of the Special Purpose Police Detachment of Azerbaijan
- Rovshan Aliyev — was an Azerbaijani criminalist
- Rovshan Janiev — also known as Rovshan Lankaransky
