= Tom Baum =

American writer (born 1940)

Thomas Henle Baum (born 1940 in New York) is an American playwright, screenwriter, novelist, and short-story writer. A graduate of Harvard, where he majored in math, Baum is best known for writing The Sender and Carny, both of which he wrote directly (as Thomas Baum) for the screen. He lives in Los Angeles with his producer wife, Carol Baum. He has two sons, Will Baum and Henry Baum, and three grandchildren. He is a descendant of the German anatomist Friedrich Gustav Jakob Henle, who discovered and named the loop of Henle in the human kidneys.

== Awards and nominations ==
- Baum has been nominated for several cable awards as a writer and director on The Hitchhiker (HBO)
- Writers Guild Best TV Movie award for Witness to the Execution
- Writers Guild Paul Selvin award for Witness to the Execution
- Won L.A.'s Eclectic Theatre Company Hurricane Season One-Act Festival for "The Out of Body Treatment for Marital Dysfunction"
- Out of the Box Award in a St. Croix, Wisconsin, Festival Theatre Festival
- Best Production in N.Y.'s End Time Theatre festival for "Epicenter"
- People Magazine's "Beach Book of the Week" for "Out of Body"

== Film and television credits ==
- Journey to the Center of the Earth (2008)
- Die with Me (2001)
- Dark Prince: The True Story of Dracula (2000)
- Journey to the Center of the Earth (TV miniseries) (1999)
- Shattered Mind (TV Movie)(1996)
- Kidnapped: In the Line of Duty (TV Movie) (1995)
- Witness to the Execution (TV Movie)(1994)
- Nightmare Cafe (4 episodes, 1992)
- - "Aliens Ate My Lunch" (1992)
- - "Sanctuary for a Child" (1992)
- - "The Heart of the Mystery" (1992)
- - "Dying Well Is the Best Revenge" (1992)
- Night Visions (TV Movie)(1990)
- War of the Worlds (TV series) (story - 1 episode)
- No Direction Home (1989)
- The Haunting of Sarah Hardy (TV Movie 1989)
- The Hitchhiker (TV Series) (written by - 3 episodes, 1987) (teleplay - 3 episodes, 1985 - 1986) (story - 1 episode, 1986)
- - "Made for Each Other" (1987)
- - "Doctor's Orders" (1987)
- - "Minuteman" (1987)
- - "The Curse" (1986)
- - "Ghostwriter" (1986)
- - "WGOD" (1986)
- The Manhattan Project (1986)
- Secret Weapons (TV Movie) (1985)
- The Sender (1982)
- Carny (1980)
- Simon (1980)
- ABC Afterschool Specials (TV Series) (screenplay - 1 episode, 1977) (screenwriter - 1 episode, 1976) (writer - 1 episode, 1976)
- - "The Horrible Honchos" (1977)
- - "P.J. and the President's Son" (1976)
- - "The Amazing Cosmic Awareness of Duffy Moon" (1976)

== Books ==
- Hugo the Hippo ISBN 978-0-515-04188-0
- It Looks Alive To Me! ISBN 0060204044
- Out Of Body ISBN 978-0-312-15620-6
- The Sender ISBN 978-84-947548-7-6
- We Remember Everything ISBN 978-84-946149-3-4
- Counterparts (Dial Press,1970)

== Short stories ==
- Lost and Found (Playboy. Best SF 1974)
- Backward, Turn Backward (Playboy. Best Short Stories 1972)
- On Location (Playboy)
- The Big Pieces (Playboy)
- The Farabi Connection (Playgirl)
- The Rebirth of Yost (Playboy)
- A Friend in Need (Transatlantic Review)

== Short films ==
Co-directed with Dennis Lo

- Kansas City Gork
- Come Dance With Me
- The Catman's Primal Scene

== Produced plays ==
- Wonk Love
- The Great Outdoors
- Ashley Saves the World
- Taps for Paps
- SchadenFriday
- The Out of Body Treatment for Marital Dysfunction
- Don't Empty the Frog (We Are Not Alone)
- Human Services
- Front Door Open
- Epicenter
- Endangered Species
- Dork Love
- Breach
- Shock Therapy
- Toby 24/7 Gets Lucky
- Free Pass
- Frenemies
- Last One Under
- Kalifa Reports for Treatment
- Sperm

== Miscellaneous ==
Tom Baum was a columnist for Filmmaking Review, and columnist and puzzlemaster for the Innuendo, a Los Angeles free paper. He taught screenwriting at UCLA and USC.

== See also ==
- List of playwrights
- List of American writers
