= John Stephen Hill =

Canadian actor

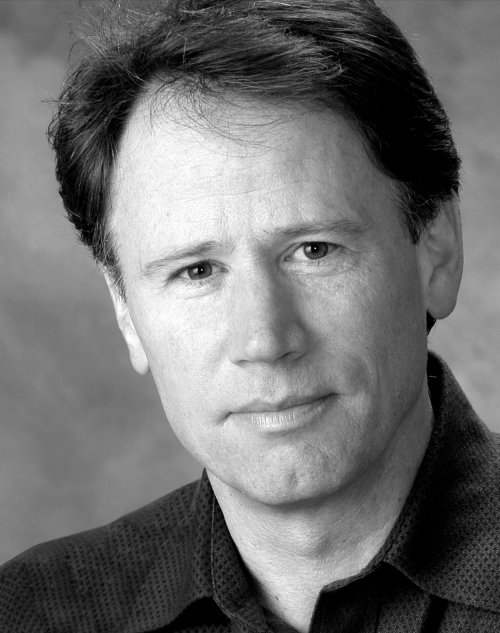
- Born: January 16, 1953 (age 73); Montreal, Quebec, Canada
- Other name: Steve Hill
- Education: London Academy of Music and Dramatic Art
- Occupations: Actor, playwright
- Years active: 1977–1982, 2015
- Website: https://sites.google.com/site/whenim64bystevehill/

John Stephen Hill (born 16 January 1953), who worked as Stephen Hill, is a Canadian actor and playwright. He returned to the theatre after three decades, as a playwright under the name, Steve Hill.

== Actor ==
Born in Montreal, the third of five children, Hill attended Earl Haig Secondary School in North York where he received Honourable Mention at Sears Ontario High School One Act Drama Festival. In 1977, he began working as an actor as 'Stephen Hill' in television commercials. Hill got his break on stage from four notable pioneers of 'Canadian' theatre: Susan Douglas Rubeš' Young People's Theatre in Toronto; two seasons with William Hutt's Grand Theatre Young Company; three seasons with Dennis Sweeting at Kawartha Summer Theatre in Lindsay, Ontario; and with Douglas Riske at Alberta Theatre Projects, Calgary.

From 1980–1982, in the West End theatre in London, England, Hill worked as John Stephen Hill because another 'Stephen Hill' was already a member of British Actors' Equity. Hill's West End work include his leading role debut in the Michael Blakemore hit Deathtrap at the Garrick Theatre, and Ladies in Retirement at the Fortune Theatre, and was directed by Tommy Tune in the original UK production of The Best Little Whorehouse in Texas at the Theatre Royal, Drury Lane. He stood by for Elizabeth Taylor's Broadway revival of The Little Foxes at the Victoria Palace Theatre. In the London fringe, Hill produced two plays. He was directed by Tom Conti in Beyond Therapy. He did play readings at Canada House, and on the Lyttleton stage at the Royal National Theatre. Hill is an alumnus of the London Academy of Music and Dramatic Art where he was directed by Ian Judge.

== Film ==
In 1980, Hill began playing small roles in films, such as The Sender, as Catherine Deneuve's first victim in The Hunger directed by Tony Scott (1983); with Sean Connery in Never Say Never Again (1983), with Vincent Price in Bloodbath at the House of Death.

== Ministry ==
Hill's acting career ended in the mid-1980s. He began a sabbatical volunteering with a L'Arche home for adults with developmental disabilities founded by Canadian humanitarian Jean Vanier. He studied theology with the Jesuits at Regis College, University of Toronto. Until his retirement in 2014, Hill served in ministry among the sick and dying. He married in 1990. They have one son, Keita.

== Playwright ==
In 2015, Steve Hill wrote and directed When I'm 64, a stage play with roles for older actresses. The play sold out Sid Williams Theatre on March 28, 2015.

The play received favorable reviews. Mark Allan called it, "triumphant, inspirational, a winner." Katherine Gibson found it, "funny, poignant, authentic," and Sharon Pollock said, "actors and audiences will love these roles."

The TV movie When I'm 64 (2015), written and directed by Steve Hill, was first broadcast on Shaw TV, March 29, 2015.

== Selected filmography ==
- The Sender (1982) – Policeman
- Deadly Eyes (1982) – Police Official
- The Hunger (1983) – Young Man from Disco
- Never Say Never Again (1983) – Communications Officer
- Bloodbath at the House of Death (1984) – Henry Noland
