= The Sender =

1982 British horror film by Roger Christian

- Theatrical film poster
- Directed by: Roger Christian
- Written by: Thomas Baum
- Produced by: Edward S. Feldman
- Starring: Kathryn Harrold; Shirley Knight; Paul Freeman; Željko Ivanek
- Cinematography: Roger Pratt
- Edited by: Alan Strachan
- Music by: Trevor Jones
- Production company: Kingsmere Productions Ltd.
- Distributed by: Paramount Pictures (through United International Pictures)
- Release date: 22 October 1982 (US)
- Running time: 92 minutes
- Country: United Kingdom
- Language: English
- Budget: $8 million
- Box office: $1.1 million (domestic)

The Sender is a 1982 British supernatural horror film directed by Roger Christian, written by Thomas Baum, and starring Kathryn Harrold, Željko Ivanek (in his film debut), Shirley Knight, and Paul Freeman. The plot follows a therapist attempting to help a disturbed telepathic man able to transmit his dreams and visions into the minds of those around him.

== Plot ==
A young, disheveled-looking man is awakened on the side of a road by passing traffic. He walks to a nearby lake and attempts to drown himself by filling his clothing with rocks and walking into the water, but is pulled out and taken to a nearby mental hospital for treatment. He is suffering from retrograde amnesia, unable to remember his name or details of his personal life, other that he lives in a house within several miles and has no father to speak of. Without any form of identification, the patient is designated “John Doe #83”, and placed under the care of psychiatrist Dr. Gail Farmer. Almost immediately, John begins to display odd behavior, with a fellow patient nicknamed “The Messiah” suddenly developing a delusion that he intends to behead him.

At her home later that night, Gail hears a window being broken and witnesses John entering her house and stealing a necklace from her nightstand. When she calls the police, they can find no evidence of a break-in, and her colleagues at the hospital tell her that John is fast asleep in his dormitory. Farmer quickly suspects that John is not all that he seems, as she continues to have strange visions while he is asleep. She theorizes to her boss Dr. Denman that John has some form of telepathy, wherein he “sends” his dreams into the minds of other people, causing them to experience semi-corporeal sensory hallucinations for the duration of the dream. Denman dismisses Gail's hypothesis as her developing a maternal bond with the young patient, and plans to have him treated with electroshock therapy against her wishes. Meanwhile, both Gail and John are haunted by the presence of a middle-aged woman named Jerolyn, apparently John's mother, who tells Gail that she must release John for everyone's well-being but disappears before she can be questioned further.

After John attempts suicide a second time, he's taken in by Denman for electroshock therapy. The moment the current is activated, John unconsciously sends violent and destructive hallucinations towards everyone in the hospital, both staff and patients. Gail rushes in and removes the electrodes. Now believing her hypothesis, Denman begins intensive study of John, while Gail continues to see Jerolyn and other cryptic visions sent by John, including one in which he lies dead with his body covered in rats. She suspects that the visions are memories of the recent past, repressed into the subconscious due to trauma. After John tells her that his mother used to lock him up in the house, she theorizes that Jerolyn, who believed that her son was a miraculous virgin birth, kept him trapped inside her house for his entire life, eventually trying to kill him with carbon monoxide poisoning when she believed he'd leave her.

John's telepathy quickly becomes more and more uncontrollable, especially after he begins “sending” while conscious. Despite Gail's protestations, John is taken into the surgical ward to have an intracranial operation to identify and neutralize the receptors causing his powers. Before the operation begins, the local Sheriff arrives to tell Denman and Gail that they found John's house and mother, but that she's been dead of carbon monoxide poisoning for five days, indicating that he killed her and not the other way around. John's placed under guard, but the moment the surgeons pierce his skull with a drill he suddenly lashes out again, this time causing the room to explode into flames. In the chaos, John steals Gail's car keys and escapes, guided by a vision of his mother.

When they arrive at their house, he turns on the gas stove to kill a swarm of cockroaches, but as he lies in bed he suddenly realizes that his mother is trying to kill him and snaps out of his hallucination. Gail bursts in and drags a suffocating John away, as they're pursued by the projection of his Jerolyn. They manage to get out of the house just before the gas ignites, destroying the house.

Some time later, John has regained his memory and tells his story – his mother tried to kill him, and when he realized what was happening, he fought her and inadvertently knocked her unconscious, leaving her to suffocate while fleeing the house. Unable to cope with what he'd done, his id took the form of a projection of his mother, trying to compel him to kill himself on multiple occasions. Seemingly cured, he leaves the hospital as Gail looks on, only to enter his truck with his mother sitting next to him, indicating he's still suffering from his condition and is bound to relapse.

== Cast ==
- Kathryn Harrold as Dr. Gail Farmer
- Željko Ivanek as John Doe #83
- Shirley Knight as Jerolyn
- Paul Freeman as Dr. Joseph Denman
- Sean Hewitt as The Messiah
- Harry Ditson as Dr. Hirsch
- Olivier Pierre as Dr. Erskine
- Al Matthews as Herb
- Marsha Hunt as Nurse Jo
- Angus MacInnes as Sheriff Prouty
- John Stephen Hill as Policeman
- Jana Shelden as Nurse Reimbold
- Tracy Harper as Young Girl
- Monica Buford as Dr. Warren
- Mary Ellen Ray as nursing staff
- John Sessions as patient
- Gary Olsen as patient

== Production ==
=== Development ===
The screenplay was written by Thomas Baum, who based in on his own experiences growing up with an agoraphobic and overly protective mother.

The script was first purchased by 20th Century Fox, who were hoping for a quasi follow-up to Brian De Palma’s The Fury (1978)—a box office hit about another youth with devastating psychic powers—but the production floundered and was dumped before it got off the ground. The production was, almost immediately, picked up by Paramount Pictures who, after Friday the 13th (1980) and My Bloody Valentine (1981), were looking for something else to tap the lucrative slasher film market. However, director Roger Christian didn’t approach The Sender as a slasher-horror in the slightest, remarking that he wanted to make a film that was “more Bergman than Carpenter.”

Christian made his feature directorial debut with The Sender after producers were impressed with his previously directed short films, Black Angel and The Dollar Bottom. Several of his previous collaborators, including composer Trevor Jones, cinematographer Roger Pratt, and special effects supervisor Nick Allder, were retained by Christian for the film.

=== Casting ===
The titular role was played by a then-unknown Željko Ivanek, who had previously only ever acted on-stage. The other leading roles were played by Kathryn Harrold, Shirley Knight, and Paul Freeman. Among the supporting actors were Al Matthews, an American-born singer and radio personality living in the UK who later gained fame for his role in Aliens, and Angus MacInnes, a Canadian character actor known for his supporting roles playing North American characters in British films and television programmes.

=== Filming ===
Exteriors were filmed in the American state of Georgia, while interiors were filmed at Shepperton Studios in Surrey.

During filming, several scenes from the script were either changed or cut. Among these were a different ending, in which the character of Gail Farmer seemingly develops telepathic powers of her own.

=== Post-production ===
Dissatisfied with Christian's initial workprint cut as “overly slow” and “artsy”, studio executives ordered the film re-edited to start with the ending and tell the story in flashback. After some argument, in which editor Alan Strachan sided with Christian, it was put back in the original sequence.

== Release ==
Due to Paramount Pictures’ lukewarm response to the film's initial cut and poor test screenings, the film was only given a limited release theatrically in the United States in October 1982. It grossed $1,054,328 at the box-office, less than its initial production budget. However, one of Christian's foreign agents had been touting the film and it was selected to open the Avoriaz Fantastic Film Festival in Avoriaz, France, where it was well received by the audience and championed by director George Miller.

=== Home media ===
Olive Films released The Sender on Blu-ray in the United States on 25 August 2015. Arrow Films released the film in a special edition Blu-ray in the United Kingdom on 17 June 2019.

== Reception ==
=== Box office ===
The film grossed $1,054,328 at the United States box office.

=== Critical response ===
Vincent Canby of The New York Times gave the film a middling review, describing it as "a parapsychological horror film of such incoherence that one can only look at it as if it were a piece of abstract art composed of easily identifiable representations of reality." The Atlanta Journal's Eleanor Ringel similarly felt the film failed to achieve its promise, but noted that it "shows unmistakable signs of care and craftsmanship" and bears "some arresting special effects." The Boston Globe's Michael Blowen praised the film's cinematography as "stunning" but felt that its screenplay lacked direction despite having a "fascinating premise." Jack Mathews of the Detroit Free Press deemed the film "visually effective," though ultimately assessed it as "one of the silliest psychological thrillers to come along in years," comparing elements of it to Carrie (1976) and The Fury (1978).

Sheila Benson of the Los Angeles Times gave the film a favorable assessment, writing that it is "a handsome, persuasive horror film," but conceded that it lacks a "straight-ahead directness," and compared it to the work of David Cronenberg. David Elliott of USA Today praised the film as a better horror film than Halloween III: Season of the Witch (released the same day in the United States), commending its style and imagery.

== Legacy ==
The film is often cited by critics as an influence on A Nightmare on Elm Street, with its mental hospital setting and use of surrealist, dream-like imagery particularly pertinent to the third film in the series, Dream Warriors. Elm Street writer-director Wes Craven was known to be a fan of writer Thomas Baum, asking him to co-develop his television series Nightmare Cafe.

On the commentary track for the DVD release of Hot Fuzz, Quentin Tarantino described The Sender as his favorite horror film of 1982.
