= Carol Baum =

American movie producer

- Born: Carol Friedland; New York City, United States
- Occupation: Movie producer
- Spouse: Tom Baum (1963-present)
- Children: 2, including Henry Baum
- Writing career
- Notable works: The Good Girl; Father of the Bride; Fly Away Home

Carol Baum (née Friedland) is an American movie producer best known for her work with Sandollar Productions. She is a member of the Academy of Motion Picture Arts and Sciences. As of 2024, she teaches producing at the USC School of Cinematic Arts, and formerly taught a similar class at the American Film Institute (AFI). She also serves as a mentor for The Peter Stark Producing Program at USC.

== Awards ==
At the 1989 Academy Awards, the documentary Common Threads: Stories from the Quilt won Best Documentary Feature. Also in 1989, Tidy Endings won a CableACE Award for Dramatic or Theatrical Special. In 1997, Fly Away Home won a Christopher Award, a Genesis Award for Best Feature Film, and the Critic's Choice Award for Best Family Film at the Broadcast Film Critics Association Awards. In addition, Caleb Deschanel was nominated for an Academy Award for Best Cinematography for the film. In 2015, Zapped won a Leo Award for Best Television Movie.

== Personal life ==
A New Jersey native, Baum is a graduate of Columbia High School in Maplewood and New York University, where she majored in sociology.

Baum worked for Bantam Books and Random House in New York, as well as The Producers Circle, developing the movie adaptations of Ira Levin's The Stepford Wives, Stephen King's The Shining, and Ira Levin's The Boys from Brazil.

After moving to Los Angeles, Baum became a studio vice president at Lorimar, where she developed Taylor Hackford's An Officer and a Gentleman, and then vice president at Twentieth Century Fox, where she developed the Mike Nichols movie Working Girl.

Baum is married to writer Tom Baum. She is mother to writer Henry Baum and has a second son. She lives in Los Angeles.

== Controversy ==
On 16 January 2024, Baum gave a talk with journalist Janet Maslin after a screening of her movie Dead Ringers, at which she said of actor Sydney Sweeney, "Explain this girl to me. She's not pretty, she can't act. Why is she so hot?".

This conversation went viral in publications including Vanity Fair, The New York Post, LA Times, and The Guardian, in which journalist Barbara Allen said, "What depressing nonsense, not to mention dire optics. A 26-year-old woman scorned at a screening honouring a veteran female producer, aged 81. A class of students encouraged to join in (such delightful attitudes to teach people going into the industry)".

Sweeney's team issued a statement, saying, "How sad that a woman in the position to share her expertise and experience chooses instead to attack another woman. If that's what she's learned in her decades in the industry and feels is appropriate to teach to her students, that's shameful. To unjustly disparage a fellow female producer speaks volumes about Ms. Baum's character."

In the same week, the story had over 16 million hits on Google with thousands of comments supporting Sweeney and attacking Baum, including a long comment by producer Teddy Schwarzman on Twitter, who said, "I'll enlighten Ms. Baum that two-time Emmy nominee Sydney Sweeney is not only one of the most talented actresses I've worked with, but also incredibly smart, kind and humble."

== Filmography ==
She was a producer in all films unless otherwise noted.

=== Film ===
Year	Film	Credit
1984	Reckless	Executive producer
1988	Dead Ringers	Executive producer
1989	Jacknife	
1989	Gross Anatomy	Executive producer
1991	True Identity	
1991	Father of the Bride	
1992	Shining Through	
1992	Straight Talk	Executive producer
1992	A Stranger Among Us	Executive producer
1992	Buffy the Vampire Slayer	Executive producer
1994	I.Q.	
1995	Kicking and Screaming	Executive producer
1995	Father of the Bride Part II	Executive producer
1996	Fly Away Home	
1997	The Only Thrill	Executive producer
1999	Snow Falling on Cedars	Executive producer
2000	Waterproof	Executive producer
2001	My First Mister	
2002	The Good Girl	Executive producer
2003	Carolina	
2004	Sexual Life	
2007	You Kill Me	
2008	Five Dollars a Day	
2014	Boychoir	

=== Television ===
Year	Title	Credit	Notes
1986	A Smoky Mountain Christmas	Supervising producer	Television film
1988	Tidy Endings	Executive producer	Television film
1998	Tourist Trap	Executive producer	Television film
2014	Zapped	Executive producer	Television film
2015	Just in Time for Christmas	Executive producer	Television film
2018	A Majestic Christmas	Executive producer	Television film
2022	Jolly Good Christmas	Executive producer	Television film
