= Semi-Gloss (album) =

Studio album by Semi-Gloss
- Released: June 3, 1997
- Recorded: Studio .45, Hartford, Connecticut
- Genre: Alternative rock
- Length: 45:21
- Label: Dirt Records (DIRT 034)

Semi-Gloss chronology
Teenie (1996)	Semi-Gloss (1997)	The Falling Kind (2000)

Semi-Gloss is the 1997 self-titled debut studio album by Semi-Gloss.

A different recording of the song "Morning Takes the Night" appears on the band's previous EP, Teenie. The song "Eight Million Strong" appears on Teenie; the version on Semi-Gloss is a remix.

The album cover design was inspired by the 1956 Blue Note recording Volume One by Sonny Rollins.

== Track listing ==
All songs written by Jordy Mokriski except where noted.

1. "Sans Expliquer" (Mokriski, Verena Wiesendanger) – 6:01
2. "The Sunburn Song" – 5:45
3. "Eight Million Strong" (David Kinnoin, Mokriski) – 3:24
4. "Free" – 3:17
5. "Summer Fields" – 4:01
6. "A Reason Why" – 3:26
7. "Latenight Stroll" – 3:25
8. "Groupie's Lament" – 5:35
9. "Whistlin' Girl" – 2:34
10. "Morning Takes the Night" – 5:43
11. "The Majestic" (Candice Belanoff, Mokriski) – 3:33

== Personnel ==
- Jordy Mokriski - guitar, vocals
- Verena Wiesendanger - lead vocals, keyboards, percussion; whistling on track 9
- Gregory Graf - bass
- Jason Harmon - drums
- Dave Berger - drums on track 7
