= The Falling Kind =

Studio album by Semi-Gloss
- Released: June 2000
- Recorded: Los Angeles, California
- Genre: Alternative rock
- Label: Dirt Records (DIRT 036)
- Producer: Paul Du Gre

Semi-Gloss chronology
Semi-Gloss (1997)	The Falling Kind (2000)

The Falling Kind is the second full-length studio album by Semi-Gloss. Released in 2000 on Dirt Records, it is the last album to be released by the band.

== Track listing ==
All songs written by Jordy Mokriski except where noted.

1. "Stephanie's Boy" – 3:05
2. "First We Kissed" – 4:27
3. "Caroline" – 4:30
4. "The Falling Kind" – 4:47
5. "Ieri E Oggi" (Mokriski, Wiesendanger) – 3:12
6. "Passerby" – 3:19
7. "Playground" – 2:58
8. "Tiny" – 3:58
9. "Baby's Changed" – 4:15
10. "Careless" (Graf, Mokriski, Wiesendanger) – 5:17
11. "Brand New Day" – 5:10

== Personnel ==
- Jordy Mokriski - guitar, vocals
- Verena Wiesendanger - lead vocals
- Gregory Graf - bass
- Lem Jay Ignacio - keyboards
- Joey Waronker - drums
- Danny Frankel - percussion
