= Semi-Gloss =

US musical group

Background information
- Origin: New York City
- Genres: Alternative pop Indie rock Lounge
- Years active: 1990s – 2000
- Labels: Dirt Records
- Members: Verena Wiesendanger; Jordy Mokriski; Gregory Graf; Henry Baum; Jason Harmon; Dave Berger
- Website: semi-gloss.com

Semi-Gloss was an alternative pop/rock band from the East Village in New York City.

== Band history ==
The band formed in the early 1990s between Jordy Mokriski and Verena Wiesendanger after Mokriski spent a year in Los Angeles writing songs. When he returned to New York City, he and Wiesendanger recorded a four-track demo. The band gained a small following, performing regularly on the Lower East Side at Luna Lounge, and began opening for artists such as Cat Power and Blonde Redhead. They appeared on KCRW's Morning Becomes Eclectic in 1999. They contributed their single "The Sunburn Song" to the Nickelodeon television series The Adventures of Pete & Pete.

Throughout the career of the band, it had been difficult to secure a drummer. Three years after the release of their debut album, the band awaited the release of their second studio album, The Falling Kind on Dirt Records. When the album was delayed, the band members decided to put the band on hiatus.

Though The Falling Kind was eventually released on Dirt Records, the label has since shut down. Copies of albums by the band have since become difficult to find.

== Band members ==
- Jordy Mokriski - guitar, vocals
- Verena Wiesendanger - vocals, keyboards, percussion
- Gregory Graf - bass
- Henry Baum - drums
- Jason Harmon - drums
- Dave Berger - drums

== Discography ==
- Teenie (1996)
- Semi-Gloss (1997)
- The Falling Kind (2000)
