= Bloodbath at the House of Death =

- Film poster, featuring Kenny Everett
- Directed by: Ray Cameron
- Written by: Ray Cameron; Barry Cryer
- Produced by: Laurence Myers; John Downes; Ray Cameron
- Starring: Kenny Everett; Pamela Stephenson; Vincent Price; Gareth Hunt
- Cinematography: Dusty Miller; Brian West
- Edited by: Brian Tagg
- Music by: Mark London; Mike Moran
- Distributed by: Columbia-EMI-Warner Distributors
- Release date: March 1984
- Running time: 88 minutes
- Country: United Kingdom
- Language: English

Bloodbath at the House of Death is a 1984 British comedy horror film directed by Ray Cameron and starring Kenny Everett, Pamela Stephenson and Vincent Price. It is an over-the-top spoof loosely inspired by The Amityville Horror and other horror films of the era, including Alien, The Exorcist and Poltergeist, among others, concerning the investigation by a pair of scientists of a manor house under the control of Satanist monks.

== Plot ==
The film opens in 1975 at a place called Headstone Manor, which is being used as a "businessman's weekend retreat and girls' summer camp". A few minutes into the film, a cult of Satanicmonks enter the house and kill 18 of its occupants.

In 1983, Doctor Lukas Mandeville (Kenny Everett) and Doctor Barbara Coyle (Pamela Stephenson) are sent to investigate radioactive readings in the area that have been traced to Headstone Manor, now known by locals as the House of Death. Along with several other scientists, Mandeville and Coyle set up their equipment in the house, while the Sinister Man (Vincent Price), a 700-year-old Satanic priest, prepares a rite in the nearby woods to purge the house of its unwanted guests.

During this time, Mandeville reveals that he was once a successful German surgeon named Ludwig Manheim, who was reduced to "smart-arse paranormal research crap" after a humiliation in the past. Coyle also encounters a poltergeist, and the two engage in sexual intercourse.

Several satanic clones of Mandeville, Coyle and the other scientists enter the house, and begin killing off the originals and taking their place. When Coyle is about to be killed, she is abducted by the poltergeist but also cloned. The satanic monks then take off in a spaceship, revealing that these monks are aliens using the house for their activities on Earth. The film ends with the spaceship soaring into the skies.

== Cast ==
- Kenny Everett as Dr. Lukas Mandeville
- Pamela Stephenson as Dr. Barbara Coyle
- Vincent Price as Sinister Man
- Gareth Hunt as Elliot Broome
- Don Warrington as Stephen Wilson
- John Fortune as John Harrison
- Sheila Steafel as Sheila Finch
- John Stephen Hill as Henry Noland
- Cleo Rocos as Deborah Kedding
- Graham Stark as The Blind Man
- Pat Ashton as Barmaid
- David Lodge as Inspector Goule
- Debbie Linden as Attractive Girl
- Tim Barrett as Doctor
- Barry Cryer as Police Inspector
- Anna Dawson as Nurse
- Gordon Rollings as Man at bar

== Production ==
Vincent Price plays the Sinister Man in the film; VHS box cover

Bloodbath at the House of Death was written by Ray Cameron and Barry Cryer, who had previously co-written the 1978 to 1981 Thames Television comedy series The Kenny Everett Video Show. Laurence Myers agreed to produce the film when the makers almost lost their financing. The film was shot entirely on location at the town of Potters Bar in Hertfordshire, England. Michael McIntyre (the son of director Ray Cameron) reveals in his autobiography that he was the voice of E.T. Myers recalls that the film did not make sense; he screened the film for censor James Ferman, who enjoyed the film, but believed that the reels were played in the wrong order.

== Release ==
The book based on the film

The film was released in the United Kingdom by Thorn EMI. It was produced in the aftermath of Kenny Everett's outburst at the Young Conservatives conference in which he called for the bombing of Russia; as a result, the media frequently referenced the film in negative context in relation to the outburst during the production, and film critics reviewed the film harshly. Film critic Martyn Auty wrote: "Presumably intended as high camp; looks like low-grade Carry On." It was given an 18 certificate in the United Kingdom.

The film was released on DVD in the United Kingdom in July 2008, with a re-rating to a 15 certificate. A novelization of the film was also published, which named Marcel Wave (one of Kenny Everett's TV characters) as the resident who underwent spontaneous combustion.
