= Rovshan Abdullaoglu =

Azerbaijani writer, philosopher and psychologist

- Rövşən Abdulla oğlu Abdullayev
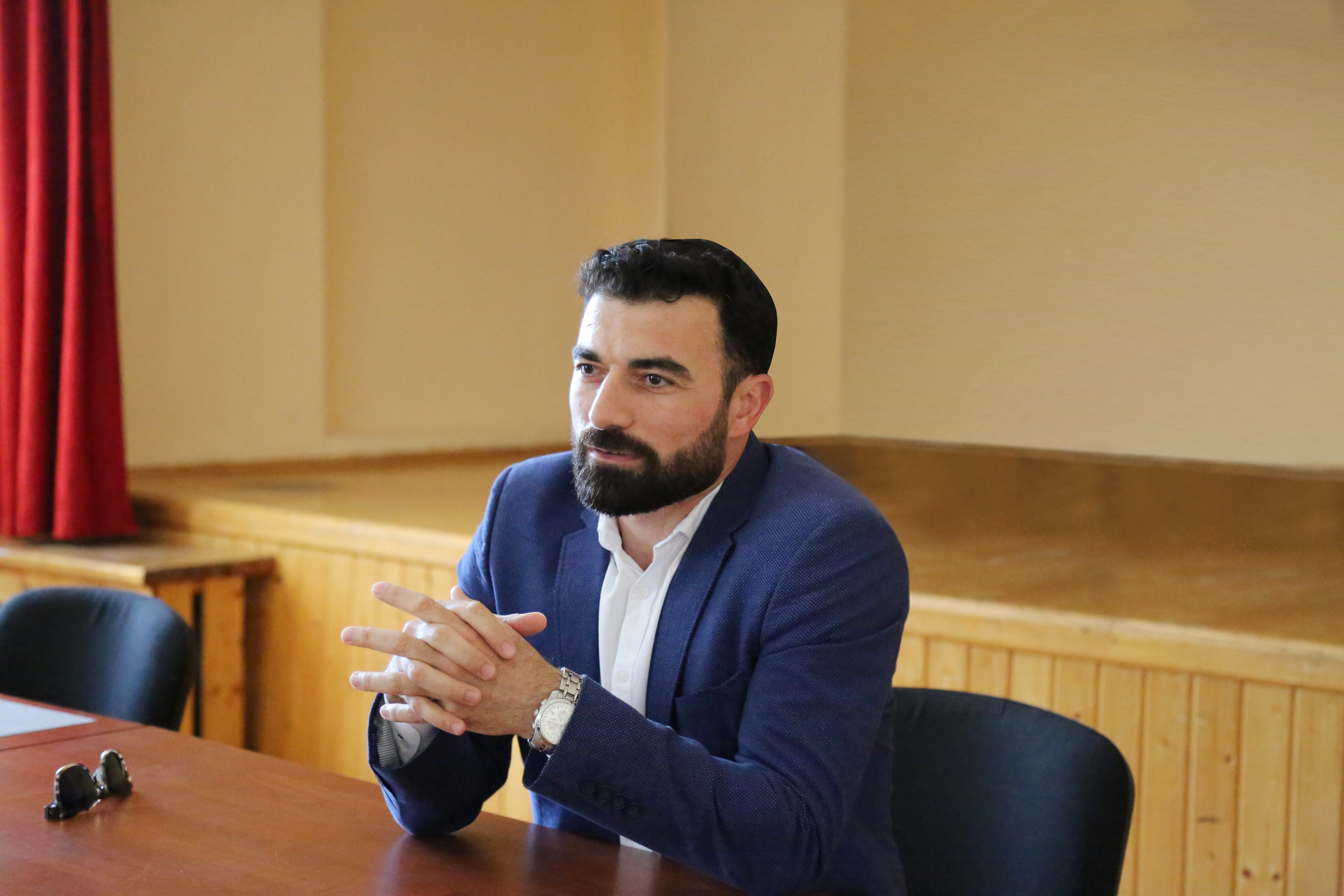
- Born: September 28, 1978 (age 48); Baku, Azerbaijan SSR
- Citizenship: Azerbaijan
- Occupations: Philosopher; theologian; psychologist; fiction and non-fiction writer; specialist in Eastern philosophy
- Writing career
- Pen name: Rövşən Abdullaoğlu
- Language: Azerbaijani
- Genres: Philosophical novel; psychological novel; detective fiction
- Website: rovshanabdullaoglu.com

Rovshan Abdulla oglu Abdullaev (born September 28, 1978) is an Azerbaijani writer, philosopher, psychologist, and a member of PEN America. He is the co-founder of the publishing house Gadim Gala, and director of its scientific department.

To date, 32 books by Rovshan Abdullaoglu have been published in Azerbaijan. Most of these have become bestsellers and have been translated into English, Russian, Turkish, Uzbek and Arabic.

In his works, he touches on topics related to psychology, philosophy, irfan, life philosophy, and theology. In 2016 the psychological novel This City is Empty became a best seller of local and foreign books in Azerbaijan. In 2024, a multi-series film of the same name based on the script by Rovshan Abdullaoglu was screened. In 2020 another best seller The Man on the Rails became a gold medal winner of the Reader's Favorite international book contests in the US In 2024 Rovshan Abdullaoglu's novel The Pathfinder: Not Your Prey became a finalist at Eric Hoffer Book Award and received Reader's Favorite five-star badge of distinction.

Rovshan Abdullaoglu is also well-known for his social activities. He conducts seminars on psychological topics, teaches philosophy in schools, cultural centers, and universities and takes part in television and radio programs. He is a founder and member of different charity projects.

== Biography ==
Rovshan Abdulla oglu Abdullaev was born into a family in Baku on September 28, 1978. His father, Abdulla Abdullayev, was then a police major and then became a lawyer. He had taken part in the First Karabakh War. His mother, Gulnara Abdullayeva, has worked in the banking sector as an accountant for about 30 years. Rovshan Abdullaoglu has two brothers, Altai Abdullayev is a pediatrician specializing in neonatology, and Farhad Abdullayev, the co-founder and CEO of the publishing house Gadim Gala.

He is married and has three children.

=== Education ===
Rovshan Abdullaoglu completed his secondary education in 1995, and soon entered Azerbaijan State Economic University. Thereafter, he served in the Azerbaijan border troops.

Abdullaoglu continued his education in Arabic and Persian languages in the fields of theology, scholastics, Arabic literature, and Eastern and Western philosophy. He studied at various universities for over eight years.

In 2013, he became a licensed gestalt therapist at the Psychological Department of the Moscow Institute of Positive Technologies and Consulting.

== Works ==
To date, 32 books by Rovshan Abdullaoglu have been published in Azerbaijan. Most of these have become bestsellers, and have been translated into English, Russian, Turkish, Uzbek, Malay, and Arabic.

Three of his books Burn the Bridges behind You, Life Goes On, No Matter What, and This City is Empty have been published in Turkey.

=== Translations and explanations ===
In 2011, Abdullaoglu started translating one of Avicenna's final books, Remarks and Admonitions (Kitab al-isharat wa al-tanbihat). In parallel with the semantic translation of the book, Rovshan Abdullaoglu provided his own interpretation of Avicenna's metaphysics and logic as two books Contemplation and On the Levels of the Mystics.

In 2012, he went on to translate the work of another philosopher-scientist: Muhammad Husayn Tabataba'i. The translation and interpretation of this treatise was published in three parts.

His interpretation to the Tabatabai's Bidayatul Hikma, written in Arabic and considered one of the most important philosophical works on ontology, was published under the title The Beginning of Wisdom.

In the same year, he translated The First Book, which is considered the first manuscript in the Islamic world.

=== Psychological works ===
In his five subsequent works, Burn the Bridges behind You, Every Human a Ruler, Life Goes on no Matter What, Rebellion and Fears, the author turns to Western and Eastern psychology.

=== Fictional works ===
His first psychological novel, This City is Empty, became the country's best-selling book for 2016. The novel has received Reader's Favorite five-star badge of distinction. It was also rated 4.5 points out of a possible 5 points by the Self-Publishing Review. In 2024, a multi-series film of the same name based on the script by Rovshan Abdullaoglu was screened.

The author's second novel The Man on the Rails was published in 2017. In 2020, the novel was awarded a gold medal in the International Readers' Favorite Book Contest (cultural fiction genre) and a five-star badge of distinction by Readers' Favorite. The novel was evaluated by IndieReaders with 4.9 points out of 5 and awarded with IR-Approved badge. It has also been rated among the best independent publications by Kirkus magazine, who featured their review of the book in a special issue (July 1, 2020).

In 2018, a book with the bewitching title Abaddon made its debut. This intellectual psychological detective story sold out in just 3 hours. This work also has received Reader’s Favorite five-star badge of distinction.

In 2022, the novel Blindworm, dedicated to the Karabakh war, was published. In a short time, the book reached first place in the list of Azerbaijani and foreign bestsellers.

== Popular science books ==
His first book The Veil of Light and Darkness, published in 2010, describes the factors of moral and personal development and decline, the properties of the soul, and the veils of light and darkness within it.

The book Signature of Life, published in 2012, describes the mystical (irfan) theory of the oldest schools of thought dating back to BC, which claims that all beings in the world are alive.

In March 2019 the first book entitled Captivity in the series of God: Myth or Reality was published. It is a science book that explains the psychological reasons for ardent defense and negation of the concept of "creator" by various ideological schools.

== Books’ success ==
His books translated into English received high reviews from a number of prestigious literary criticism organizations in the USA.

=== This City is Empty ===
"Two memorable lives collide in This City is Empty, an emotionally gripping and challenging novel by Rovshan Abdullaoglu. Abdullaoglu weaves philosophy, poetry, rhetoric, and self-reflection in a masterful way, making this novel an unpredictable and ultimately profound read.

— Self-Publishing Review

“This is a philosophical novel that poses the question (among others): How can a person find happiness? Or, put another way, how can one break the chains that years of unhappiness forge? An engaging tale that wears its sincerity proudly and offers readers spiritual sustenance. Abdullaoglu is clearly an author who writes from the heart.

— Kirkus Reviews

“Overcoming barriers of race, culture, and residue of life’s setbacks — from family abandonment to the perils of war — This City is Empty by Rovshan Abdullaoglu is a valuable read.

— IndieReader

“The concept of the novel, a negative person meeting a positive person who changes his entire outlook on and the events of his life, is intriguing and fresh. The prose is well-crafted. The protagonist’s personal transformation based on a growing relationship with a kind, wiser person is executed with flair and genuine insight here.

— BookLife Prize

“Philosophical, open-minded readers will find much food for thought in this novel centered on two very different men’s discussions.

— BookLife Reviews

"This City is Empty is a beautiful story of ﬁnding your center and that one person who will change you for the better. It feels genuine and enticing at the same time. I am a huge fan of author Rovshan Abdullaoglu and loved The Man on the Rails (another novel by R.A.). Mr. Rovshan is a masterly writer!

— R.Tanveer for Reader's Favorite

=== The Man on the Rails ===
“The Man on the Rails is a powerful work. Rovshan Abdullaoglu writes with passion and grace with an impressive sense of detail and atmosphere in a modern novel crackling with ancient wisdom.”

— Rob Errera for IndieReader, IR Approved

"The storytelling is convincing, and its philosophical aspect has a timely and vital message. An absorbing and contemplative tale about the ravages of war and the need for love."

— Kirkus Reviews

"Great for fans of Boris Pasternak’s Doctor Zhivago, Khaled Hosseini’s A Thousand Splendid Suns.”

— BookLife Reviews

“Abdullaoglu's prose is strong, and each character shines through with their unique voices.”

— BookLife Prize

"I would highly recommend The Man on the Rails to readers who appreciate thoughtful literary fiction with a wide-ranging perspective."

— K.C. Finn for Readers' Favorite ★★★★★

"As is found in Abdullaoglu's other work, there is an engaging juxtaposition of modern knowledge, ancient cultural traditions, and intense philosophical effort.”

— Self-Publishing Review

"This book is a tribute to hope: no matter how hopeless things may seem, there is always hope and it is worth living for."

— Nara Hodge, author, member of the British Poetry Society

=== Abaddon ===
This story is more than a psychological thriller; it also touches on cultural biases, mental health, the nature of power struggles, blurred moral lines, art, mythology, science and so much more. This unusual tale is more than worth the ride. A page-turning spiral into the circles of hell, Abaddon is another impressive release from a continually innovative and poignant wordsmith.

— Self-Publishing Review

The prose is straightforward. This plot is original, the split between narrative and another style is highly unique. The physical descriptions of Ireland are often quite lovely.

— BookLife Prize

The grisly nature of the murders will grip genre fans hard and pull them along.

— Kirkus Review

Abaddon by Rovshan Abdullaoglu is a character study wrapped in a murder mystery. The author shines at psychological drama, building suspense and mystery that hooks the reader from beginning to end.

— IndieReader

The storyline of Abaddon by Rovshan Abdullaoglu is gripping and will grab your attention from the first chapter. The plot twists were unique, and the ending was perfect. Abaddon is a brilliant and unforgettable read.

— Lesley Jones for Readers' Favorite

=== Life Goes on no Matter What ===
Life Goes on no Matter What by Rovshan Abdullaoglu is an earnest self-help guide that offers principles to live by, and helps readers deal with loss and grief. The author uses his own personal experiences and artwork to convey his message, and includes journal pages for readers to use. This work is impactful, and could easily be applied to many painful life events.

— IndieReader

Life Goes On No Matter What by Rovshan Abdullaoglu is a compelling book in the area of motivational psychology. Packed with wisdom for readers to unfold, and one that teaches us how to value life and give it meaning.

— Divine Zape for Readers' Favorite

== Social activity ==
Rovshan Abdullaoglu conducts seminars on psychological topics, teaches philosophy in schools, cultural centers, and universities and takes part in television and radio programs.

Following his research during his study at university on the effects of social factors on adolescent psychology and the facts for and against the theory of evolution, Rovshan Abdullaoglu published many articles on these topics in newspapers and magazines.

In 2018, he donated the whole profit from the sale of the book The Man on the Rails to the Azerbaijan Social Community Aid for Orphans and Children of Martyrs.

In 2019, the "Friend of Health" award, compiled by the awarding commission of "EGE hospital," known for its professional medical staff and high medical service, was presented for the first time in the country to Rovshan Abdullaoglu. The hospital will provide free lifelong check-ups, ambulatory, and polyclinic services to the writer.

In 2020, he was invited as an expert to the series of webinars "European Union: For Gender Equality" organized by the UN Population Fund and the UN-WOMEN organization, and to the state television program organized within the framework of this project.

By the initiative of Rovshan Abdullaoglu, 2,020 of his books were presented by Gadim Gala publishing house to veterans, soldiers, and families of martyrs of the Second Karabakh War.

For his project "Zəfər tarixi 2020" (Victory History 2020) Rovshan Abdullaoglu was awarded with a "Certificate of Appreciation" by "Əmanət" - a project to support the personal development of children of martyrs and veterans.

In 2022, he gave a speech on "Psychological Traps that Control Our Choices" at the TEDx organized by the British College.

In 2022 and 2023, he became a winner of the VI and VII Grant Competitions for Development and Innovation in Education with his psychological development programs, Discover Yourself and Trust Yourself, which serve to improve educational results.

In June 2023 Rovshan Abdullaoglu visited the US by the invitation of Azerbaijani diaspora and cultural centers in the USA. The author has held several meetings at seven states of the United States. The main goal of the events organized during the visit that covered various social and psychological topics was to promote the contemporary literature of Azerbaijan.

== Hobby ==
=== Sport ===
Since childhood, Rovshan’s main hobbies have been reading books and playing sports. As a teenager, he was actively engaged in wrestling, sambo, karate, judo, boxing and acrobatics. In 2011, he won a silver medal at the international judo competition "Vahdat."

=== Travel ===
To enrich his creativity and get to personally know the historical and famous places mentioned in his books and the cultures of different people, he traveled to many countries, such as Ireland, Spain, Belgium, Switzerland, and Italy.

In 2018-2019, he visited African countries and got acquainted with the traditions of the Pygmy, Hadzabi, Mursi, Karajong, and Hamar tribal communities.

In December 2019, the writer was on a trip to Latin American countries and took part in an expedition to the Antarctic continent from Ushuaia, the last city of the southern hemisphere, known as the "End of the World" in Argentina. He also learned the function of the Bellinshausen polar station.
