= Boychoir (film) =

2014 film

- Teaser poster
- Directed by: François Girard
- Written by: Ben Ripley
- Produced by: Carol Baum; Judy Cairo; Jane Goldenring
- Starring: Garrett Wareing; Kathy Bates; Eddie Izzard; Kevin McHale; Josh Lucas; Debra Winger; River Alexander; Dustin Hoffman
- Cinematography: David Franco
- Edited by: Gaétan Huot
- Music by: Brian Byrne
- Production company: Informant Films
- Distributed by: Mongrel Media
- Release dates: September 5, 2014 (TIFF); April 3, 2015
- Running time: 103 minutes
- Country: United States
- Language: English
- Box office: $3.8 million

Boychoir is a 2014 American drama film directed by François Girard and written by Ben Ripley. The film stars Dustin Hoffman, Kathy Bates, Debra Winger, Josh Lucas, and the American Boychoir, conducted by, and choral arrangement by, Fernando Malvar-Ruiz.

== Plot ==
Stet Tate is a 12-year-old student who is disruptive and often gets in trouble, but displays a natural affinity with music. His single mother, who was struggling with a drinking problem, dies in a car accident. His father, who has a wife and two daughters sends him to an elite music boarding school, the American Boychoir School, to keep Stet's existence a secret. Stet is admitted due to his vocal ability but also because of the generous amount of money the father pays them.

Stet struggles to fit in, because the other pupils are privileged children, and he cannot read music. Stet's behavior is also problematic for some of the staff. However, he works hard, learning music theory and practicing his vocal technique, and becomes one of the best singers, which allows him to join on the choir's tours.

Stet's father's family receives tickets, anonymously sent by the school, for an important performance of the choir. Stet's father does not want to go, for fear of revealing his secret son, but the family attend. After the concert he decides to transfer Stet to a school in Switzerland, but Stet, encouraged by staff member Carvelle, refuses to go. Carvelle threatens the father to expose his secret, and the father keeps Stet at the school.

Stet and Devon, another student, develop an antagonistic relationship. Devon exposes Stet's mother's criminal record to the other students, causing Stet to beat him in his room. The teachers council considers expulsions for both of them, but reverse the decision. Riverside Church. Stet sings a descant, which includes a D^{6} in alt, to Handel's Hallelujah chorus, but soon after, Stet's voice starts to change as he grows older.

The father ultimately tells his family, and his wife accepts this. Stet starts living with them in New York.

== Cast ==
- Garrett Wareing as Stet Tate (singing voice by Benjamin Perry Wenzelberg)
- Kathy Bates as Headmistress
- Eddie Izzard as Drake, Carvello's right-hand
- Kevin McHale as Mr. Wooly, music teacher
- Josh Lucas as Gerard Olin. Stet's father
- Debra Winger as Ms. Patricia Steel, school principal in Odessa, Texas
- River Alexander as Rafael "Raffi" Abrams, choir boy
- Dustin Hoffman as Mr. Anton Carvelle, choir master
- Joe West as Devon, choir boy
- Thomas Valenti, choir boy
- Grant Venable as Andre, choir boy
- Janine DiVita as Sally Olin

== Production ==
Hoffman stars in Boychoir as the choir master Carvelle, with Bates as the school's headmistress; the director is François Girard with a script by Ben Ripley. Originally, the cast was to include Alfred Molina, but he left the project. In February 2014, Debra Winger, Eddie Izzard, Kevin McHale, Josh Lucas, and newcomers Garrett Wareing, Joe West, River Alexander, and Grant Venable joined the cast. Wareing plays a young man who joins a boys' choir; Winger plays the principal of the boys' school in Odessa, Texas; Izzard, replacing Alfred Molina, played Drake, the choir master's right-hand at the school; Lucas plays the boy's estranged father. McHale portrayed a young music teacher who champions the boy and West, Alexander and Venable play other boys in the chorus.

=== Filming ===
Principal photography began in February 2014 in New York City and in Stamford, New Haven, and Fairfield, Connecticut, some at Fairfield University.

== Release ==
Boychoir premiered at the 2014 Toronto International Film Festival on September 5, 2014 before receiving a limited release in the United States on April 3, 2015.

Hallmark Cards subsequently bought the distribution rights to air the film on its Hallmark Hall of Fame program. Boychoir was retitled Hear My Song and was planned to air on CBS on April 16, 2016. However, on April 13, 2016, the premiere was cancelled at the last minute.

== Reception ==
Boychoir received mixed reviews from critics. On review aggregator website Rotten Tomatoes, the film has a 46% rating based on 46 reviews. The consensus states: "Boychoir rests heavily –and not always comfortably –on the shoulders of Dustin Hoffman, whose typically excellent work isn't always quite enough to compensate for an overly predictable drama." On Metacritic, the film holds a 51 out of 100 rating based on 10 critics, indicating "mixed or average" reviews.

== Soundtrack ==
- Josh Groban – "The Mystery of Your Gift"
- Julia Ward Howe – "Battle Hymn of the Republic"
- Bottleneck – "Home Grown Country Folk"
- Roh Ogura – "Hotaru Koi", from his 1958 Nine Pieces on Children's Songs of Tohoku Region
- Benjamin Britten – "This Little Babe", from his A Ceremony of Carols
- Claire Woolner and Nick Sena – "Lose Their Mind"
- Thomas Tallis – "Spem in alium"
- Gabriel Fauré – "Pie Jesu"
- Nick Page – "Niska Banja"
- Felix Mendelssohn – "Denn er hat seinen Engeln befohlen" from his Elijah
- Benjamin Britten – "Balulalow", from his A Ceremony of Carols
- Benjamin Britten – "That yongë child", from his A Ceremony of Carols
- Sarah Hopkins – "Past Life Melodies"
- Sergei Rachmaninoff – Prelude in C-sharp minor
- Karl Jenkins – "Adiemus"
- George Frideric Handel – "Coronation Anthem"
- George Frideric Handel – Aria from Ode for the Birthday of Queen Anne
- George Frideric Handel – Hallelujah from Messiah
