= Cory English =

American actor (born 1968)

- Born: 1968 (age 57–58); Rochester, New York, U.S.
- Education: Drama Studio London
- Occupation: Stage actor
- Spouse: Sara Alexander

Cory English (born 1968) is an American actor, best known for his work on stage, most recently as Doctor Emmett Brown in the London production of Back to the Future: The Musical.

== Early life ==
Born into a blue collar family in Rochester, New York, English was the youngest of four boys. English attended Wayne Central School District in Ontario, New York. He lived for several years in New York City.

== Career ==
His West End credits include Chicago, and Guys and Dolls (as Benny Southstreet). In 2014 and 2015, English starred in a UK national tour of the Mel Brooks musical The Producers as Max Bialystock reprising a role he played on the UK tour in 2007 and in the West End production.

English worked on Young Frankenstein, another Mel Brooks musical, playing the part of Igor in the Broadway production of Young Frankenstein in 2008, replacing Christopher Fitzgerald. He reprised that appearance for a United States national tour, which also featured former Broadway co-stars Roger Bart and Shuler Hensley. Other Broadway credits include Chicago, Hello Dolly, Guys and Dolls and A Funny Thing Happened on the Way to the Forum.

In 2013, English appeared at Portland Center Stage in Somewhere in Time.

English had a brief, uncredited appearance in the mockumentary talent show Britain's Got the Pop Factor... and Possibly a New Celebrity Jesus Christ Soapstar Superstar Strictly on Ice aired on Channel 4 in October 2008. English played a helium balloon inhaling singer auditionee, giving his rendition of Mika's hit "Grace Kelly". English and Kay had worked together previously (Kay playing flamboyant, gay director Roger De Bris) in The Producers at the Palace Theatre, Manchester in 2007.

In 2017, English returned to the role of Igor in Young Frankenstein at the West End's Garrick Theatre.

English starred as Maître D' in the 2019 film Cats. English also currently plays The Great Raven in the animated series Hilda.

In 2023, English succeeded Roger Bart as Emmett Brown in the West End production of Back to the Future: The Musical, after having previously covered the role briefly during Bart's absence.

In 2026, English played Nostradamus in Manchester Opera House's production of Something Rotten! with Jason Manford as Nick Bottom.
