= Self-Publishing Review =

Online book review magazine

SPR is an online book review magazine for indie authors founded in 2008 by American author Henry Baum.

== Overview ==
Self-Publishing Review is a daily online report of indie book reviews, articles, and news related to the self-publishing industry. It is a self-publishing portal.

== Staff and funding ==
Self-Publishing Review was founded by the author and blogger Henry Baum in 2008 in Los Angeles, California. Their annual writing contest, the SPR Book Awards, was started in 2014. It awards prizes in the categories small press and independent authorship.
