= Lisa Kerney =

American sportscaster (born 1981)

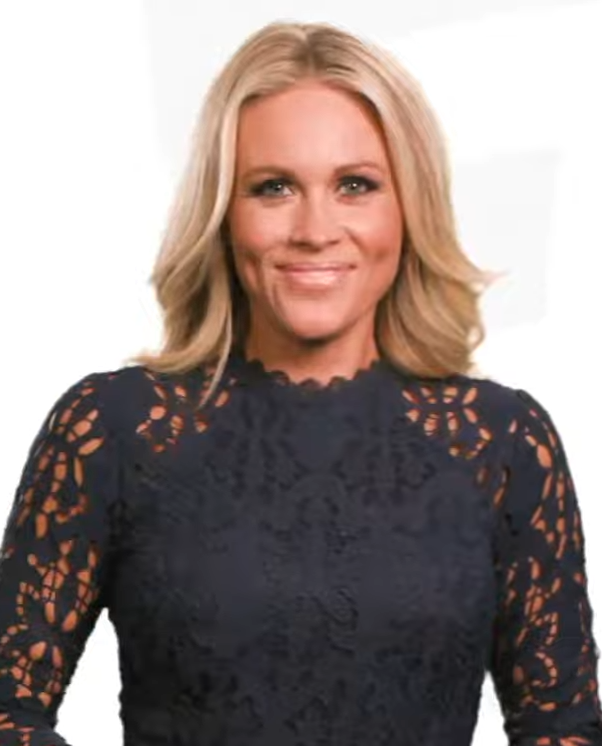
- Kerney in 2022
- Born: Lisa Diane Gangel; July 8, 1981 (age 45); Kansas City, Missouri, U.S.
- Education: Lynn University, 2004
- Years active: 2004–present
- Spouse(s): Patrick Kerney (m. 2010–present)
- Children: 4

Lisa Diane Gangel Kerney (born July 8, 1981) is an American sportscaster who worked for ESPN until April 2018.

== Early life and education ==
Kerney grew up in Leawood, Kansas, where she graduated from St. Thomas Aquinas High School in Overland Park, KS in May, 2000. Upon graduation, Kerney attended Lynn University in Boca Raton, Florida, as a broadcast communications major and was point guard and captain of the women's basketball team; the Fighting Knights are in NCAA Division II. She earned a bachelor's degree in May 2004 and gave the commencement address a dozen years later in 2016.

== Career ==
It was announced in September 2018 that Kerney would host "More Ways to Win" on FanDuel's TVG.

Kerney joined ESPN in February 2014 and was the co-anchor of the 11 p.m. Sportscenter. Her last day on ESPN was on April 27, 2018.

Prior to joining ESPN, Kerney was the sports anchor at WCBS-TV in New York, for CBS 2 News This Morning since January 2012. She had also been at MLB Network from October 2010 to December 2011, where she was a sports contributor/reporter. Kerney worked for five years at KING-TV in Seattle, from October 2005–10, as weekend sports anchor and Northwest Sports Tonight host.

She received The Montana Standard 2005 People’s Choice Awards: Top Choice for "Best Sports Reporter," and "Best TV Personality," while sports producer/reporter/anchor at KXLF-TV in Butte, Montana (September 2004–05). In the summer of 2003, she interned at Metro Sports in her native Kansas City, Missouri.

== Personal life ==
Her husband Patrick Kerney (b. 1976) was a defensive end for eleven seasons in the National Football League. They married in 2010 and have four children.
