= Shuler Hensley =

American singer and actor (born 1967)

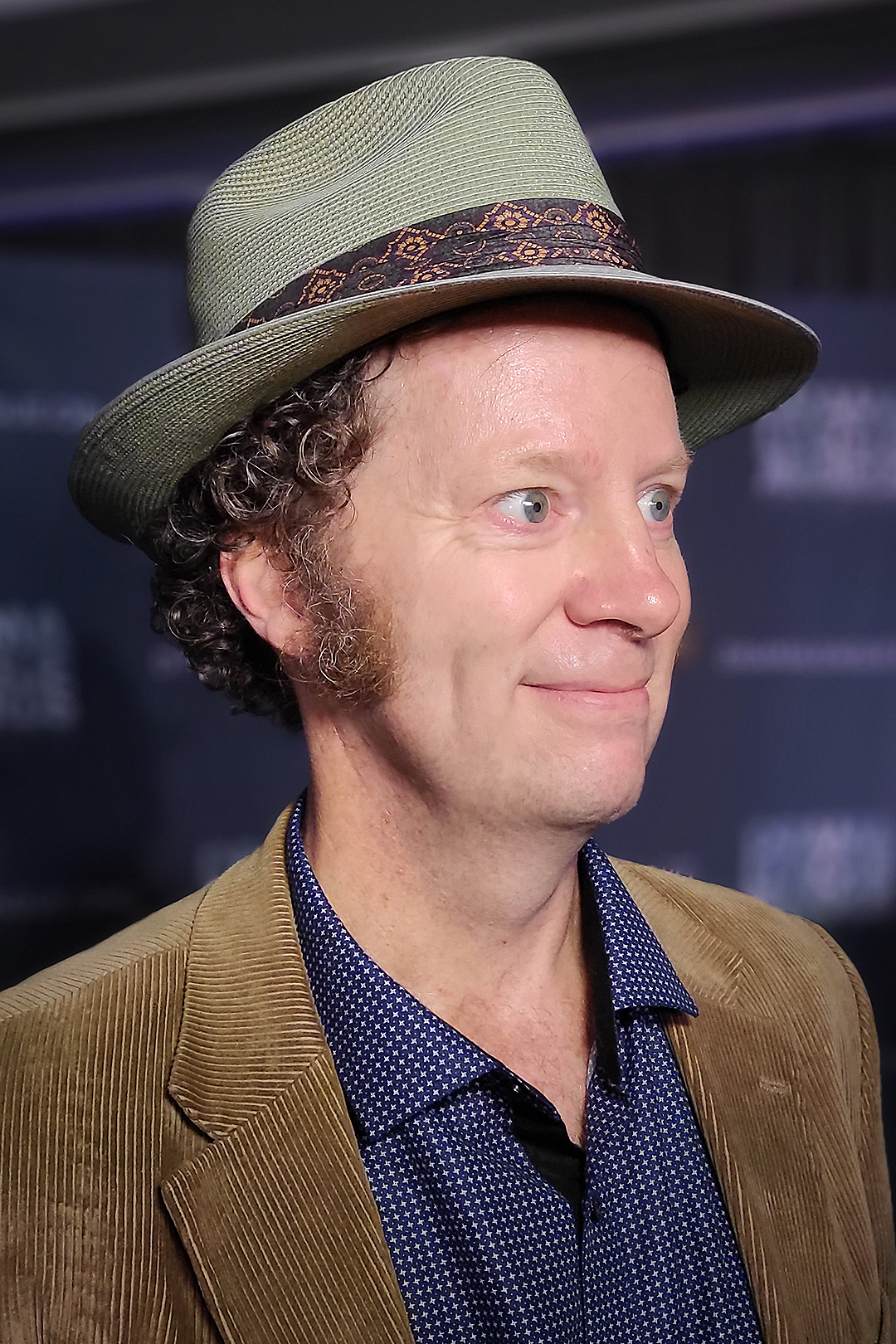
- Hensley in 2022
- Born: Shuler Paul Hensley; March 6, 1967 (age 59); Atlanta, Georgia, United States
- Education: University of Georgia; Manhattan School of Music (BM); Curtis Institute of Music (MM)
- Occupation: Actor
- Years active: 1971–present
- Spouse: Paula DeRosa
- Children: 2
- Website: shulerhensley.com

Shuler Paul Hensley (born March 6, 1967) is an American singer and actor. Shuler has appeared in eight Broadway productions, earning a Best Featured Actor in a Musical in 2002 for his performance as Jud Fry in the revival of Oklahoma!, along with several nominations for Drama Desk Awards and Outer Critics Circle Awards in his career.

== Early life ==
Hensley was born in Atlanta, Georgia. The youngest of three children, Hensley grew up in Marietta, Georgia. His father, Sam P. Hensley Jr., is a former Georgia Tech football star, retired civil engineer and former state senator. His mother, Iris Hensley, (née Antley), was a ballerina, and later, Founder and Artistic Director of the Georgia Ballet ** Professional Company and school. Hensley had an early start in show business at the age of four when he appeared as Fritz in her production of The Nutcracker.

He was educated at The Westminster Schools and attended the University of Georgia on a baseball scholarship. After attending a recital by Jessye Norman and being cast as Judge Turpin in a college production of Sweeney Todd, he decided to transfer after his second year to the Manhattan School of Music, where he majored in opera and graduated in 1989. From there, he went to the Curtis Institute of Music, Philadelphia, and obtained his master's degree in 1993.

== Career ==
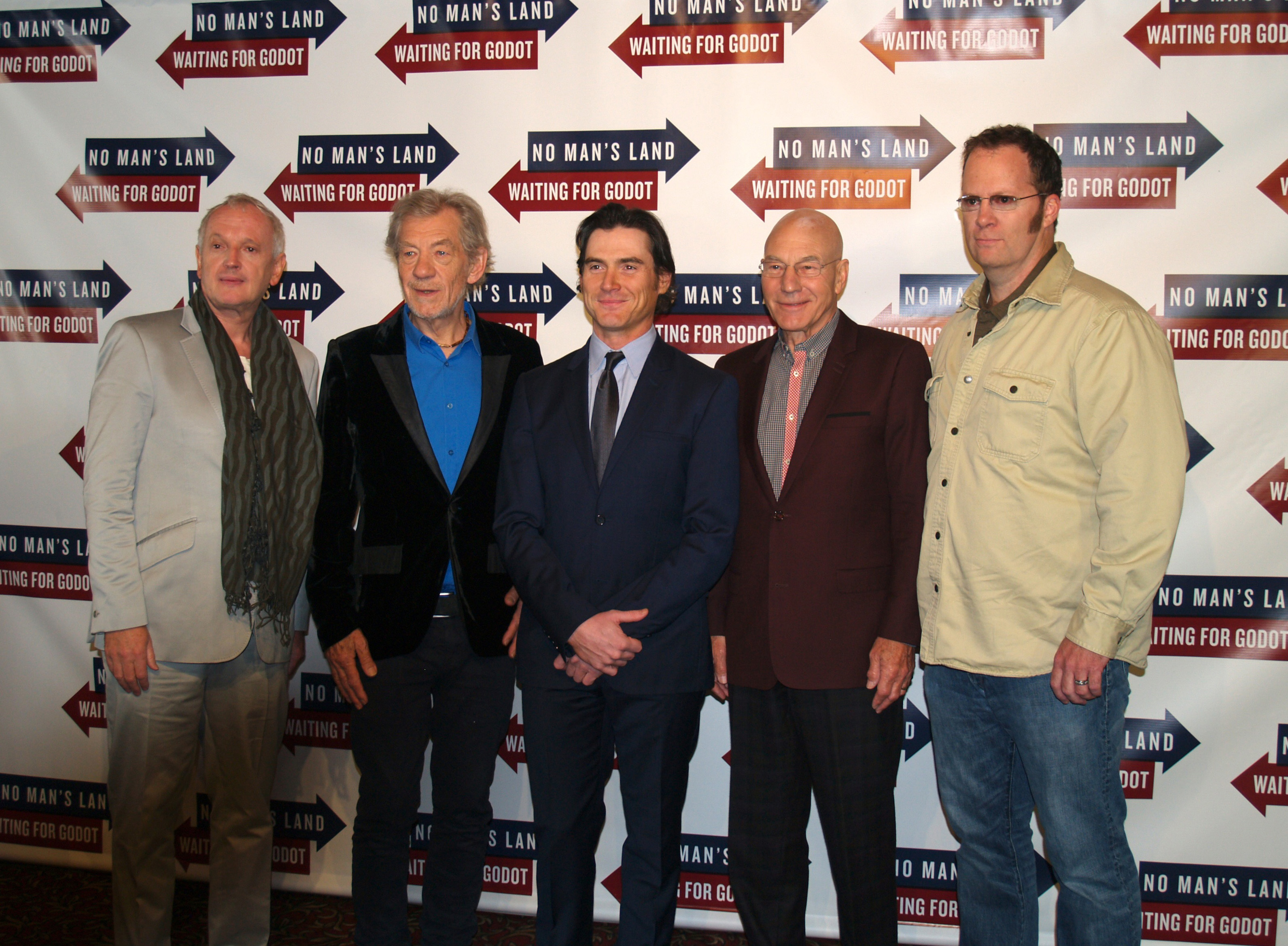
Hensley (right), at a September 24, 2013 press junket at Sardi's restaurant for Waiting for Godot and No Man's Land. Beside him from left to right, are director Sean Mathias and actors Ian McKellen, Billy Crudup and Patrick Stewart.

Hensley's stage career began in the early 1990s with roles such as Pitkin in On the Town, Joe in The Most Happy Fella, and Miles Gloriosus in A Funny Thing Happened on the Way to the Forum, He has also sung in the Gilbert and Sullivan operettas Pirates of Penzance and Patience and in the operas Carmen, Faust, La bohème and Don Giovanni. And in addition to an early Oklahoma! casting as Jud Fry at the North Shore Music Theatre, Boston, Shuler also played Curly at the Skylight Opera Theatre, Milwaukee.

In 1996, he went to Hamburg, Germany to perform the title role in The Phantom of the Opera in German.

In 1998, he was cast as Jud Fry for London's National Theatre production of Oklahoma! The revival was a huge success and Hensley received wonderful personal notices as well as the Olivier Award. He continued to play the role when the show transferred to the West End (1999), the only American native in the cast, and then to Broadway (2002–2003), where he won a Tony, a Drama Desk Award and an Outer Critics Circle Award for the same role.

He has performed on several occasions with Hugh Jackman. They both performed in the musical Oklahoma! in London in 1998, as well as in the films Someone Like You, and Van Helsing, in the latter of which Hensley played Frankenstein's monster and also performed reference motion capture as Mr. Hyde. He cameoed in The Greatest Showman which starred Jackman. In 2021, Hensley and Jackman starred as Marcellus Washburn and Harold Hill in the broadway revival of The Music Man

Hensley also starred in the Broadway production of Young Frankenstein as the Monster. For this role he was nominated for the Drama Desk Award for Outstanding Featured Actor in a Musical and the Outer Critics Circle Award for Outstanding Featured Actor in a Musical. He also reprised the role in the United States national tour which also featured his former co-stars Roger Bart and Cory English. He again played the role in the 2017 West End production.

In 2011 he portrayed American Yiddish theatre great Boris Thomashefsky in The Thomashefskys: Music and Memories of a Life in the Yiddish Theater, a concert stage show celebrating the Thomashefskys and the music of Yiddish theatre, hosted by their grandson the conductor Michael Tilson Thomas. The show aired on the PBS series Great Performances in 2012.

In 2012 he starred as a 600-pound man in the Off Broadway production of The Whale at Playwrights Horizons.

In April–May 2015, Hensley sang the role of the Celebrant in Leonard Bernstein's Mass, in a concert version with the Philadelphia Orchestra under conductor Yannick Nézet-Séguin. Later that year he appeared in a Tokyo production of Hal Prince's Prince of Broadway.

In fall 2016, Hensley co-starred with Sutton Foster in The New Group's revival of Sweet Charity.

The Georgia High School Musical Theatre Awards are also known as the Shuler Hensley Awards in his honor. The winners of these awards qualify to go on to the national Jimmy Awards.

== Work ==
=== Stage productions ===
Broadway

- Les Misérables (Javert)
- Oklahoma! (Jud Fry)
- Tarzan (Kerchak)
- Young Frankenstein (The Monster)
- No Man's Land (Briggs)
- Waiting for Godot (Pozzo)
- The Ferryman (play) (Tom Kettle)
- The Music Man (Marcellus Washburn)

Off-Broadway

- Sweet Charity (Oscar)
- The Great American Trailer Park Musical
- The Whale (Charlie)
- Assassins (Leon Czolgosz)

Other credits

- It's All About Us - Westport Playhouse
- Oklahoma! (Jud Fry) - West End
- Newsies (Joseph Pulitzer) - Workshop
- The Phantom of the Opera (The Phantom of the Opera) - Hamburg, Germany
- The Most Happy Fella - American Songbook / Lincoln Center
- Regina - Kennedy Center
- Young Frankenstein (The Monster) - United States National Tour & West End
- Hercules (Hades) - Paper Mill Playhouse
- A Little Night Music (Count Carl Magnus) - David Geffen Hall
- My Fair Lady (Alfred P. Doolittle) - Aspen Music Festival

=== Filmography ===
- Oklahoma! (1999)
- Someone Like You (2001)
- A Wedding for Bella (2001)
- Van Helsing (2004)
- Opa! (2005)
- The Legend of Zorro (2005)
- Monday Night Mayhem (2002)
- After.Life (2009)
- Law & Order: Criminal Intent
- Ed
- Odd Thomas (2013)
- Neon Joe, Werewolf Hunter (2015)
- The OA (2016)
- The Greatest Showman (2017)
- Prodigal Son as Deputy Crutchfield (2021)
- Dexter: New Blood as Elric Kane (2022)

=== Discography ===
- Oklahoma! 1998 Royal National Theatre Recording as Jud Fry
- Frankenstein, The Musical Highlights Concept/Demo Recording, released in 2001 as the Creature
- The Great American Trailer Park Musical: Off-Broadway Cast Recording released January 2006
- Tarzan: Original Broadway Cast Recording, June 2006
- Broadway's Greatest Gifts: Carols for a Cure Volume 9, 2007
- Young Frankenstein: Original Broadway Cast Recording

- The Music Man: 2022 Broadway Revival Cast Recording

== Awards and nominations ==
Award	Year	Category	Work	Result	Ref.
2002	Tony Awards	Best Featured Actor in a Musical	Oklahoma!	Won	
2002	Drama Desk Awards	Outstanding Featured Actor in a Musical	Oklahoma!	Won	
2002	Outer Critics Circle Awards	Outstanding Featured Actor in a Musical	Oklahoma!	Won	
2008	Drama Desk Awards	Outstanding Featured Actor in a Musical	Young Frankenstein	Nominated	
2008	Outer Critics Circle Awards	Outstanding Featured Actor in a Musical	Young Frankenstein	Nominated	
2013	Outer Critics Circle Awards	Outstanding Actor in a Play	The Whale	Nominated	
2013	Outer Critics Circle Awards	Outstanding Actor in a Play	The Whale	Nominated	
2017	Drama Desk Awards	Outstanding Featured Actor in a Musical	Sweet Charity	Nominated	
