= Young Frankenstein (musical) =

Musical

- Original Broadway Cast Album cover
- Music: Mel Brooks
- Lyrics: Mel Brooks
- Book: Mel Brooks; Thomas Meehan
- Basis: Young Frankenstein by Gene Wilder; Mel Brooks
- Productions: 2007 Seattle (tryout); 2007 Broadway; 2009 United States tour 2011 United States tour 2017 West End
- Awards: Outer Critics Circle Award for Best Musical

Young Frankenstein (promoted as The New Mel Brooks Musical: Young Frankenstein) is a musical with a book by Mel Brooks and Thomas Meehan, and music and lyrics by Brooks. It is based on the 1974 comedy film of the same name written by Gene Wilder and Brooks who also directed and has described it as his best film. It is a parody of the horror film genre, especially the 1931 Universal Pictures adaptation of Mary Shelley's Frankenstein and its 1935 and 1939 sequels, Bride of Frankenstein and Son of Frankenstein.

After tryouts in Seattle and four weeks of previews, the musical opened on Broadway on November 8, 2007 to mixed reviews. The Broadway production closed on January 4, 2009, after 29 previews and 485 performances. A U.S. tour started on September 29, 2009, in Providence, Rhode Island.

A revised version of the show opened in London's West End at the Garrick Theatre on October 10, 2017 (after a tryout at the Theatre Royal, Newcastle) to positive reviews.

== Background ==
After the success of his 2001 musical, The Producers, based on Brooks's earlier film of the same name, Brooks decided to create a musical based on another of his successful films. Brooks and Meehan (the same team that crafted The Producers) began work on the project in April 2006. An October 2006 reading of the first draft of the script directed by Susan Stroman (who had directed the earlier musical) featured Brian d'Arcy James as Dr. Frankenstein, Kristin Chenoweth as Elizabeth, Sutton Foster as Inga, Roger Bart as Igor, Marc Kudisch as Inspector Kemp, and Shuler Hensley as the Monster.

Cloris Leachman, reprising her film role as Frau Blucher, also attended the table read, and at the time it was widely reported she would be offered the role of Blucher for the stage show. However, gossip maven Liz Smith reported in her January 12, 2007 New York Post column that Leachman was sent a letter informing her she would not be considered for the Broadway production because the producers wanted to keep the film and stage properties separate (and also because of Brooks's concerns over Leachman's ability to perform the character consistently at her age). Despite this, due to Leachman's success on Dancing with the Stars, Brooks reportedly asked her to reprise her role as Frau Blucher after Beth Leavel left the production. However, the production closed before Leachman could take over the role.

== Productions ==
=== Seattle tryout and Broadway (2007–2009) ===
The pre-Broadway try-out played at the Paramount Theatre in Seattle, Washington from August 7 through September 1, 2007.

Young Frankenstein began previews on Broadway on October 11, 2007, and opened on November 8 at the Lyric Theatre (then the Hilton Theatre) and closed on January 4, 2009, after 485 performances. Directed and choreographed by Susan Stroman, it starred Roger Bart as Frankenstein, Megan Mullally as Elizabeth, Christopher Fitzgerald as Igor, Sutton Foster as Inga, Andrea Martin as Frau Blucher, Shuler Hensley as The Monster, and Fred Applegate as Inspector Kemp. Sets were designed by Robin Wagner and costumes by William Ivey Long; orchestrations were by Doug Besterman. The production had a reported $16 million-plus budget and a top ticket price of $450 in its "differential seating". It also sold front row tickets for $25 each based on a lottery a few hours before each performance. The producers indicated that they planned to buck the usual Broadway practice by not reporting Box Office returns.

The musical's original cast album was released on December 26, 2007, by Decca Broadway and was third on the Billboard Top Cast Album chart in the beginning of January 2008.

Replacements for the Broadway company included Kelly Sullivan as Inga, Beth Leavel as Frau Blucher, Michele Ragusa as Elizabeth, and Cory English as Igor.

=== US tours ===
First National Tour A touring production of the show began in September 2009 at the Providence Performing Arts Center, Providence, Rhode Island. The cast for the tour included Roger Bart and Shuler Hensley, reprising their Broadway roles, along with Cory English (Igor), Brad Oscar (Inspector Kemp/Blind Hermit), Beth Curry (Elizabeth), Joanna Glushak (Frau Blucher), and Anne Horak (Inga).

The show went on temporary hiatus on August 8, 2010, and re-opened on September 12, 2010, with a new cast that includes Christopher Ryan as Frederick Frankenstein, Preston Truman Boyd as The Monster, David Benoit as Inspector Kemp, Janine DiVita as Elizabeth, and Synthia Link as Inga. English and Glushak continued to play the roles they originated on tour.

Second National Tour The show re-opened for a second National Tour on September 30, 2011, at the Hanover Theatre for the Performing Arts in Worcester, Massachusetts. The cast included A.J. Holmes (Frederick Frankenstein), Lexie Dorsett (Elizabeth), Elizabeth Pawlowski (Inga), Rory Donovan (The Monster), Pat Sibley (Frau Blucher), Christopher Timson (Igor), and Britt Hancock (Inspector Kemp/The Hermit).

=== Newcastle tryout and West End (2017–2018) ===
The show made its UK premiere at the Newcastle Theatre Royal from August 26 to September 9, 2017, before transferring to London's West End at the Garrick Theatre, where it began previews on September 28 and opened on October 10. The production was directed and choreographed by Susan Stroman, featured set design by Beowulf Boritt, costume design by William Ivey Long, lighting design by Ben Cracknell, sound design by Gareth Owen, and Andrew Hilton as musical director with Glen Kelly as musical supervisor. It was produced by Brooks, Michael Harrison, Fiery Angel, and Kevin Salter.

This production is a reworked version of the Broadway production, which features changes to some of the lyrics and book by Brooks and Meehan. For example, the "Transylvanian Lullaby Theme" from the original film by John Morris is used throughout, such as during the Overture, "The Experiment", "Frederick's Soliloquy", and the exit music. Some songs and scenes were cut, including "The Happiest Town" (making the musical start with "The Brain" after the Overture), "Join The Family Business" (cutting Frederick's dream sequence entirely), "Life, Life", and most of "Man About Town". The dialogue after "Surprise" is cut, ending the scene at the end of the song. Brooks wrote some new numbers, such as "It Could Work" (sung by Frederick, Igor, Inga, and Blucher upon discovering Victor's notes) and "Hang Him Till He's Dead" (replacing "The Law"). The character of Mr. Hiltop is cut during "The Brain", and instead Frederick performs his demonstration on one of the students, Bertram Batram. The production is also notably reworked for intimate venues such as the Garrick Theatre to work as a vaudeville piece, unlike the larger scaled Broadway production.

On April 21, the initial casting was announced, including Hadley Fraser as Frederick Frankenstein, Ross Noble as Igor, Lesley Joseph as Frau Blucher, Dianne Pilkington as Elisabeth, Summer Strallen as Inga, and Patrick Clancy as Inspector Kemp. Shuler Hensley reprised his role as the Monster from the original Broadway and North American tour productions. Nic Greenshields succeeded Hensley in the role of the Monster beginning November 20, 2017. Cory English succeeded Noble in the role of Igor beginning February 12, 2018, reprising the role from the Broadway and North American tour productions.

The Original London Cast Recording featuring 23 tracks was released on August 10, 2018, which was recorded live over several performances (although it is labeled as the "Original London Cast Recording", the album features Nic Greenshields as The Monster, who replaced Shuler Hensley). A UK Tour was announced at the same time for late 2019; however, this never occurred and no explanation was ever provided. The West End production closed on August 25, 2018, after 11 months.

The revised UK production made its North American debut at the La Mirada Theatre for the Performing Arts in La Mirada, California in September, 2022 starring Sally Struthers as Frau Blücher, A.J. Holmes as Frederick Frankenstein, Sarah Wolter as Elizabeth, Trent Mills as The Monster, Maggie Ek as Inga, Wesley Slade as Igor, and Gregory North as Inspector Kemp & The Hermit (in place of the injured Joe Hart).

=== International Productions ===
A Brazilian production produced by Möeller & Botelho and Aventura Teatros was shown in Rio de Janeiro from August 18 to October 8, 2023 at Teatro Multiplan and in São Paulo from January 18 to March 10, 2024 at Teatro Bradesco. It included the script and orchestration changes from the West End version, and starred Marcelo Serrado, Dani Calabresa, Hamilton Dias, Totia Meireles, Claudio Galvan, Bel Kutner, Malu Rodrigues and Fernando Caruso.

The international rights of both the West End and the Broadway versions are currently held by Musical Theatre International. This has led to multiple international productions including in Zürich in 2019 and Bonn in 2023.

=== Live television production (TBA) ===
The musical version was to be used as the basis of a live broadcast event on the ABC network in the last quarter of 2020, with Brooks producing. As of June 2024, there has been no further word on the status of the project.

== Synopsis of original Broadway production ==
=== Act I ===
In 1934, the villagers of Transylvania Heights celebrate the funeral procession of the mad scientist Dr. Victor von Frankenstein. However, Inspector Kemp, who has a wooden right arm and wooden left leg, tells the town of the existence of Victor's grandson: Frederick, the Dean of Anatomy at New York's Johns, Miriam and Anthony Hopkins School of Medicine. The village idiot, Ziggy, convinces the other villagers that there is no way a New York doctor would come to Transylvania, thus continuing the celebration ("The Happiest Town").

In New York, Frederick Frankenstein is embarrassed to be a Frankenstein, insisting his name be pronounced "Fronkensteen" and that he is not a madman but a scientist. He teaches his students about the greatest mind of science ("The Brain"). After learning that he has inherited his grandfather's castle in Transylvania, he is forced to resolve the issue of the property. As Elizabeth Benning, Frederick's fiancée, sees him off, it is clear that their relationship is far from physical as Elizabeth enumerates all the lustful situations from which she is abstaining ("Please Don’t Touch Me”).

Arriving at Transylvania Heights, Frederick meets the hunchback Igor (pronounced "Eye-gore"), the grandson of Victor's henchman, who is overjoyed to meet Frederick. Igor tries to convince him to continue in his grandfather's footsteps ("Together Again"); he has already hired the services of Inga, a yodeling lab assistant with a degree in Laboratory Science from the local community college. After a wagon ride to Castle Frankenstein ("Roll in the Hay"), they meet the mysterious Frau Blucher, whose spoken name frightens the horses.

Once inside the castle's main living room, Frederick falls asleep reading Rebecca of Sunnybrook Farm and dreams that his grandfather and ancestors encourage him to build a monster ("Join the Family Business"). He is awakened by Inga, and they, followed shortly by Igor, find the secret entrance to his grandfather's laboratory behind a book case by following eerie violin music. They discover the mysterious violin player to be Frau Blucher, who tells how she came to be more than just the late Victor's housekeeper ("He Vas My Boyfriend"). After reviewing his grandfather's notes, Frederick decides to carry on the experiments in the reanimation of the dead and asks Igor to find a large corpse as well as the brain of a scholar. The villagers gather at the local town hall for a meeting and are instructed to be on the lookout for grave robbers, as Frederick and Igor go through the town with their corpse ("The Law"). Igor returns with the brain, but drops it, secretly replacing it with another. Frederick creates the creature ("Life, Life"), who goes on a violent rampage shortly after waking. The doctor is dismayed and furious to find that Igor had provided an abnormal brain.

Inspector Kemp and the townspeople come to the castle to investigate, pretending to welcome Frederick ("Welcome to Transylvania"). Frederick and his employees try to stall the villagers ("Transylvania Mania") while Frau Blucher frees the Monster without letting Frederick know. Panic ensues as the monster breaks free from the stage and runs through the audience.

=== Act II ===
The town begins to search for the Monster, with Frau Blucher trying to bring him back with music from her violin, but to no avail ("He's Loose"). Inga talks to the anxious doctor ("Listen to Your Heart"). Frau Blucher and Igor find the two suspended on the table where the Monster was brought to life, having just had sex.

Elizabeth arrives unexpectedly in Transylvania with a large entourage ("Surprise") and finds Frederick and Inga, both in a state of undress, who tells her that no funny business was taking place. Meanwhile, the Monster finds a blind hermit named Harold after breaking through the wall of his house ("Please Send Me Someone"). Eventually, after Harold accidentally pours hot soup into the Monster's lap and lights his thumb (mistaking it as a cigar), the Monster is pained into another wild rampage and leaves. Frederick locks himself into a room with the Monster, and after overcoming his fears he tells the Monster that he is a handsome man who is loved and will be hailed by all ("Man About Town").

The Monster is presented at the Loews Transylvania Theatre, now dressed as a gentleman, first walking on command, and then dancing to Irving Berlin's "Puttin' On the Ritz". While taking his bow, the Monster is scared when some stage lights explode. Elizabeth is kidnapped by the creature and is taken to a cave, where he forces himself on her. However, she is now seeing a different side of the Monster and discovers what she has been yearning for in her life ("Deep Love"). Luring the Monster back to the castle by the music of a French horn, Frederick attempts an intelligence transfer, but the Monster does not wake, and to make things worse, Inspector Kemp and the angry villagers (believing that Elizabeth has been killed by the Monster) break into the castle and bring Frederick to the gallows. The doctor is hanged after finally accepting his family name ("Frederick's Soliloquy").

The Monster returns, not only able to speak articulately but also using his newly transferred medical skills to discover that Frederick is not dead, but merely unconscious and is able to revive him. Just as the crowd is about to re-hang Frederick and the Monster, Elizabeth arrives with a Bride of Frankenstein hairdo. The Monster proposes to Elizabeth ("Deep Love" (Reprise)) and a happy ending is ahead for all as the moon shines high on the newly engaged Doctor and Inga ("Finale Ultimo").

=== Differences from the original film ===
Although the plot remains mostly the same, there are several changes from the original film. "The Happiest Town" is not based on any scene from the film. Elizabeth arrives in Transylvania earlier than in the film, where she arrives after "Puttin' on The Ritz", a song performed in the film by only Frederick and the Monster; in the musical, it is sung by all characters except Elizabeth and the villagers. The scene from the film with the little girl is not in the musical. In the film, the Monster is lured not by a French horn but a violin, and awakens in the laboratory directly after the brain transfer; in the musical, the villagers hang Frederick before the Monster wakes and saves him, with the ensuing finale much expanded.

== Musical numbers ==
=== Broadway song list ===
Act I

- Overture – Orchestra
- "The Happiest Town" – Ziggy and Villagers
- "The Brain" – Frederick and Medical Students
- "Please Don't Touch Me" – Elizabeth and Passengers
- "Together Again" – Frederick and Igor
- "Roll in the Hay" – Inga, Frederick, and Igor
- "Join the Family Business" – Victor and Mad Scientists
- "He Vas My Boyfriend" – Frau Blucher
- *"The Law" – Kemp and Villagers
- "Life, Life" – Frederick, Igor, Inga, and Frau Blucher
- *"He Vas My Boyfriend" (Reprise) – Frau Blucher
- "Welcome to Transylvania" – Kemp and Village Quartet
- "Transylvania Mania" – Igor, Frederick, Inga, and Villagers

Act II

- "Entr’acte" – Orchestra
- "He's Loose" – Kemp and Villagers
- "Listen to Your Heart" – Inga
- "Surprise" – Elizabeth, Frau Blucher, Igor, and Entourage
- "Please Send Me Someone" – The Hermit
- "Man About Town" – Frederick
- "Puttin' On the Ritz" (music and lyrics by Irving Berlin) – Frederick, The Monster, Inga, Igor, and Chorus of Monsters
- *"He's Loose" (Reprise) – Kemp and Villagers
- "Deep Love" – Elizabeth
- "Frederick's Soliloquy" – Frederick
- "Deep Love" (Reprise) – The Monster and Villagers
- "Finale Ultimo" – The Company

*Note: "The Law" and the reprises of "He Vas My Boyfriend" and "He's Loose" are not included on the cast recording.

=== London song list ===
Act I

- "Overture" – Orchestra, Frederick and Medical Students
- "The Brain" – Frederick and Medical Students
- "Please Don't Touch Me" – Elizabeth and Passengers
- "Together Again" – Frederick and Igor
- "Roll in the Hay" – Inga, Frederick, and Igor
- "He Vas My Boyfriend" – Frau Blucher
- "It Could Work" – Frederick, Igor, Inga, and Frau Blucher
- "Hang Him Til He's Dead" – Kemp and Villagers
- "He Vas My Boyfriend" (Reprise) – Frau Blucher
- "Welcome to Transylvania" – Kemp and Transylvania Quartet
- "Transylvania Mania" – Igor, Frederick, Inga, and Villagers

Act II

- "He's Loose" – Kemp and Villagers
- "Listen to Your Heart" – Frederick and Inga
- "Surprise" – Elizabeth, Igor, Frau Blucher, and Entourage
- "Someone" – Hermit, The Monster
- "Puttin' On the Ritz" (Music and Lyrics By Irving Berlin) – Frederick, The Monster, Inga, Igor, and Chorus of Monsters
- "Deep Love" – Elizabeth
- "Frederick's Soliloquy" – Frederick
- "Deep Love" (Reprise) – The Monster and Villagers
- "Finale Ultimo" – Company

== Casts ==
Role	Workshop	Seattle tryout	Original Broadway production	First US national tour	Reopened first US national tour	Second US national tour	Original West End production
Role	2006	2007		2009	2010	2011	2017
Frederick Frankenstein	Brian d'Arcy James	Roger Bart	Roger Bart	Roger Bart	Christopher Ryan	A.J. Holmes	Hadley Fraser
Elizabeth	Kristin Chenoweth	Megan Mullally	Megan Mullally	Beth Curry	Janine DiVita	Lexie Dorsett Sharp	Dianne Pilkington
Igor	Roger Bart	Christopher Fitzgerald	Christopher Fitzgerald	Cory English	Cory English	Christopher Timson	Ross Noble
Inga	Sutton Foster	Sutton Foster	Sutton Foster	Anne Horak Gallagher	Synthia Link	Elizabeth Pawlowski	Summer Strallen
Frau Blucher	Cloris Leachman	Andrea Martin	Andrea Martin	Joanna Glushak	Joanna Glushak	Pat Sibley	Lesley Joseph
The Monster	Shuler Hensley	Shuler Hensley	Shuler Hensley	Shuler Hensley	Preston Truman Boyd	Rory Donovan	Shuler Hensley
Inspector Kemp/The Hermit	Marc Kudisch	Fred Applegate	Fred Applegate	Brad Oscar	David Benoit	Britt Hancock	Patrick Clancy

=== Broadway replacement cast ===
- Kelly Sullivan replaced Sutton Foster as "Inga" on July 8, 2008.
- Beth Leavel replaced Andrea Martin as "Frau Blucher" on July 15, 2008.
- Michele Ragusa replaced Megan Mullally as Elizabeth on August 5, 2008.
- Cory English replaced Christopher Fitzgerald as "Igor" on November 25, 2008.

=== London replacement cast ===
- Nic Greenshields replaced Shuler Hensley as The Monster from November 20, 2017.
- Cory English replaced Ross Noble as Igor from February 12, 2018.

== Instrumentation ==
The Broadway orchestrations by Doug Besterman call for a large twenty-four-piece orchestra, including three violins, two violas, two violoncelli, three trumpets, two trombones, two French horns, four woodwinds, three keyboards, one drum set, one percussionist, and one bass.

The London orchestrations, also by Besterman, have been scaled down for a nine-piece orchestra.

== Reception ==
Young Frankenstein generally received mixed critical reviews and was often compared to The Producers, a 2001 adaptation of another Mel Brooks film. Ben Brantley of The New York Times called it "an overblown burlesque revue, right down to its giggly smuttiness ... Mr. Brooks’s songs have a throwaway quality, as if they were dashed off on the day of the performance."

The New York Post gave a more positive review, saying that the show "is nearly very good indeed" and that "Brooks and Stroman pull out every stop. Despite music that's more ho-hum than hummable, Brooks' lyrics are bright and witty. Better yet, the book ... does a great job, with the assistance of co-writer Thomas Meehan, in transferring the original script to the stage."

The Daily Telegraph said that "Susan Stroman directs and choreographs with her usual wit and invention", but also mentioned that "you cannot escape the impression that everyone is working desperately hard to animate essentially weak material, and the show fatally lacks that touch of the sublime that made The Producers so special."

The production won a Broadway.com Audience Award for Favorite New Broadway Musical.

When describing the audience's reaction, Brooks said, "I love what they do. The audience knows 'Young Frankenstein' the movie; they didn't know 'The Producers.' They all neigh when anyone on stage says 'Frau Blucher.' And they can't wait for the Blind Hermit to spill the hot soup on the monster's lap. It's great to see the audience play ping-pong with the actors."

The West End production fared much better with critics and even received four to five star ratings from WhatsOnStage.com, The Guardian, The Daily Telegraph, and the London Evening Standard.

== Major awards and nominations ==
=== Original Broadway production ===
Year	Award	Category	Nominee	Result	Ref.
2008	Tony Award	Best Performance by a Featured Actor in a Musical	Christopher Fitzgerald	Nominated	
2008	Tony Award	Best Performance by a Featured Actress in a Musical	Andrea Martin	Nominated	
2008	Tony Award	Best Scenic Design of a Musical	Robin Wagner	Nominated	
2008	Drama Desk Award	Outstanding Featured Actor in a Musical	Christopher Fitzgerald	Nominated	
2008	Drama Desk Award	Outstanding Featured Actor in a Musical	Shuler Hensley	Nominated	
2008	Drama Desk Award	Outstanding Featured Actress in a Musical	Andrea Martin	Nominated	
2008	Drama Desk Award	Outstanding Lyrics	Mel Brooks	Nominated	
2008	Drama Desk Award	Outstanding Choreography	Susan Stroman	Nominated	
2008	Outer Critics Circle Award	Best Musical		Won	
2008	Outer Critics Circle Award	Best Score	Mel Brooks	Nominated	
2008	Outer Critics Circle Award	Best Actor in a Musical	Roger Bart	Nominated	
2008	Outer Critics Circle Award	Best Featured Actor in a Musical	Christopher Fitzgerald	Nominated	
2008	Outer Critics Circle Award	Best Featured Actor in a Musical	Shuler Hensley	Nominated	
2008	Outer Critics Circle Award	Best Director of a Musical	Susan Stroman	Nominated	
2008	Drama League Award	Distinguished Production of a Musical		Nominated	
2008	Drama League Award	Distinguished Performance	Roger Bart	Nominated	
2008	Drama League Award	Distinguished Performance	Sutton Foster	Nominated	
2009	Grammy Award	Best Musical Theater Album		Nominated	

=== Original US national tour ===
Year	Award	Category	Nominee	Result	Ref.
2011	San Francisco Bay Area Theatre Critics Circle Award	Best Production		Nominated	

=== Original West End production ===
Year	Award	Category	Nominee	Result	Ref.
2018	Laurence Olivier Awards	Best New Musical		Nominated	
2018	Laurence Olivier Awards	Best Actor in a Supporting Role in a Musical	Ross Noble	Nominated	
2018	Laurence Olivier Awards	Best Actress in a Supporting Role in a Musical	Lesley Joseph	Nominated	
