= Witness to the Execution =

- Genre: Crime; Drama
- Written by: Keith Pierce; Priscilla Prestwidge; Thomas Baum
- Directed by: Tommy Lee Wallace
- Starring: Sean Young; Len Cariou; George Newbern; Dee Wallace Stone; Alan Fudge; Tim Daly
- Music by: Mark Snow
- Country of origin: United States
- Original language: English

Production
- Executive producers: Frederick S. Pierce; Keith Pierce; Richard Pierson
- Producer: Casey Lee Justice
- Production location: Houston
- Cinematography: Richard Leiterman
- Editor: Patrick Kennedy
- Running time: 96 minutes
- Production company: Frederick S. Pierce Company

Original release
- Network: NBC
- Release: February 13, 1994

Witness to the Execution is a 1994 American made-for-television drama film directed by Tommy Lee Wallace and starring Tim Daly and Sean Young. Its plot concerns a fictional television network's desire to carry the live execution of a condemned killer as a pay-per-view event. It also portrays the events surrounding the attempt to create a television show about the execution.

== Plot ==
The story follows television executive Jessica Traynor, who proposes a controversial idea to broadcast a live execution as a reality special. She argues it would be a ground-breaking exploration of justice and public accountability, but her real motive is to boost ratings for her struggling network.

As the project gains corporate backing, Dennis Casterline, a condemned man on death row, agrees to participate for money that will go to his family. Public reaction is polarized: some see it as an honest look at capital punishment, while others condemn it as exploitation. Traynor’s team stages elaborate preparations, turning the event into a global media spectacle.

However, as the execution date approaches, Traynor begins to confront the human cost of her creation. She interviews Dennis and realizes the network has manipulated the story, concealing key facts about his trial. On the night of the broadcast, she faces a moral crisis, torn between her ambition and her conscience. In the film’s climax, she attempts to halt the execution, but the network overrides her, broadcasting the death live. The aftermath leaves her career and sense of ethics in ruins, exposing the corrupting power of media sensationalism.

== Cast ==
- Sean Young as Jessica Traynor
- Tim Daly as Dennis Casterline
- Len Cariou as Jake Tyler
- George Newbern as Phillip Tyler
- Dee Wallace Stone as Emily Dawson
- Alan Fudge as Wallace Sternberg
- Brian Markinson as Kirby Jacobs
- Marina Gonzalez Palmier as Cynthia Moore
- Constance Jones as Lucy
- Alex Morris as Ramos
- Lourdes Regala as Dornbush
- Brandon Smith as Toyoshima
- Blue Deckert as Lieutenant Mike Spalding
- James Black as the Chaplain
