= Janine DiVita =

American actress

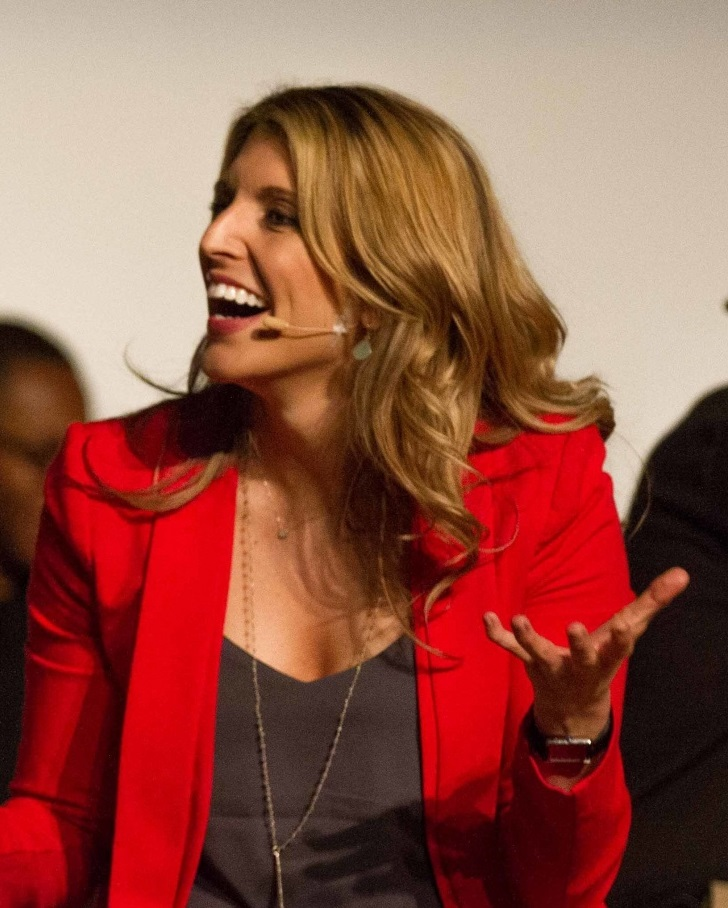
Janine DiVita at Joint Base Lewis–McChord, 2016.

Janine DiVita is an American actress best known for her roles on Broadway and in musical theater.

== Theater career ==
Janine DiVita played the principal role of Anne in the Michael Greif-directed first national tour of If/Then, a role originally played by Jenn Colella. DiVita played opposite LaChanze in the first part of the tour and acts alongside Tamyra Gray. She also played Mary Barrie in the first national tour of Finding Neverland, directed by Diane Paulus.

BroadwayWorld review of If/Then in Phoenix noted the tour was "further blessed by the appearance of DiVita," who "stands out for her vibrant moves and vocals." And the Dallas review noted that "her epic voice adds new life to the show, particularly in Act Two's 'Love While You Can.'"

On Broadway, DiVita has performed in the latest revival of Grease (Rizzo) directed by Kathleen Marshall, Anything Goes (Reno cover), and The Mystery of Edwin Drood (sole cover for Edwin Drood and Rosa Bud). She also played Elizabeth in the first national tour of Mel Brooks' Young Frankenstein, directed by Susan Stroman.

Her Off-Broadway/NYC roles includes Pearl Kantrowitz in the stage adaptation of film "A Walk on the Moon" (directed by Michael Greif, New York Stage and Film) and Hannie in "Roadside" (York Theatre Company).

DiVita has starred in roles at regional theaters. These roles and theaters include Nancy in Oliver! at the Walnut Street Theatre in Philadelphia (DiVita was nominated for a Barrymore Award for Outstanding Leading Actress in a Musical) and Eva Perón in Evita

DiVita is the only University of Michigan graduate to have received both the inaugural Alan Eisenberg / Actor's Equity Association award for achievement in musical theater and the Earl V. Moore Award for achievement in musical theatre.

== Concert work ==
DiVita has performed at Broadway Rox (national and international tours), Atlanta Symphony, Edmonton Symphony, Omaha Symphony, Madison Square Garden (National Anthem), Foxwoods Casino, Casino Rama (Canada), Lincoln Center, Canal Room, and 54 Below in which DiVita premiered her two solo shows: "Blonde Ammunition" and "Lit: Modern Broad".

== Film and television ==
DiVita appears in seasons 2 and 3 of "The Deuce" opposite Luke Kirby and as "Jennifer" in Gravesend (Amazon). Other credits include Irish Tenor Paul Byrom in "This Is The Moment" PBS special (Dir. Brent Carpenter) in which she appears as a guest artist singing the duet "Somewhere", The Americans, and Elementary. She appears in the feature film, "Boychoir" (directed by Francois Gerard) in which she plays the supporting role of Sally opposite Josh Lucas and Dustin Hoffman.

== Personal life ==
DiVita graduated from the University of Michigan, in which she double majored in musical theatre and communication studies. She is a former reporter for WOLV-TV at the University of Michigan, an alumni member of Alpha Phi sorority, and current ambassador for Global Citizen. She serves as the director of the USO Show Troupe and is the co-founder of Empowered Voices, a prevention education company.

== Film and television credits ==
Year	Film / TV	Production	Role	Network / Production Co.	Notes
2014	Film	Boychoir	Sally	Informant Media	co-stars: Josh Lucas, Dustin Hoffman
2013	TV	This Is The Moment	(as herself)	PBS	co-stars: Irish Tenor Paul Byrom
2018	TV	The Deuce	Amy Goldman	HBO	co-stars: James Franco, Maggie Gyllenhaal
