= Henry Baum =

American novelist

- Born: Frederick Henle Baum; June 29, 1972 (age 54); New York City, U.S.
- Education: Bachelor of Arts
- Occupations: Novelist; blogger; musician
- Spouse: Cate Baum (2013–present)
- Children: One daughter
- Relatives: Tom Baum (father); Carol Baum (mother)
- Writing career
- Period: 2001–present
- Genre: Fiction
- Notable works: The Golden Calf, North of Sunset, The American Book Of The Dead; God's Wife,Oscar Caliber Gun
- Notable awards: Gold IPPY Award for Visionary Fiction Best Fiction at the DIY Book Festival Hollywood Book Festival Grand Prize
- Website: www.henrybaum.com

Henry Baum (born June 29, 1972) is an American writer, blogger, and musician. He writes novels that are published in the UK (Rebel Inc.) and France.

== Early life ==
Baum was born and raised in New York. He relocated to Los Angeles in his early childhood. His parents are Tom Baum and Carol Baum.

== Career ==
Baum is the author of five novels and several published short stories. Additionally, he has contributed work to Identity Theory, Storyglossia, Scarecrow, Dogmatika, Purple prose, 3:AM Magazine, and Les Episodes. He has published with Canongate and Cloverfield Press.

=== Awards ===
Baum has won three awards: the Gold IPPY Award for Visionary Fiction, Best Fiction at the DIY Book Festival and the Hollywood Book Festival Grand Prize. In 2013, he was one of seven finalists for Best Writer at The Erotic Awards in London UK, along with Belle de Jour (writer) aka Dr Brooke Magnanti, Pamela Stephenson, and Alan Moore for his book God's Wife.

=== Film ===
A short film version of some of the scenes from The Golden Calf was made by director Ruben Fleischer while he was mentored by Robert Rodriguez at AFI. This film starred Kevin Corrigan, Elizabeth Berridge, Jay Johnston, Lelia Goldoni, and Robert Joy.

=== Blogging ===
Henry Baum founded Self-Publishing Review, a website for self-published authors. He co-founded Filmmaking Review in 2012. Baum has also written a blog under the female pseudonym Shirley Shave. This blog later evolved into the 2012 novel God's Wife.

=== Music ===
Baum played drums and bass guitar in several bands including Semi-Gloss, Montag, and others. He also released two solo albums under the name Ash Tree.

== Personal life ==
Baum is married to Cate Baum, a British writer and filmmaker. Henry Baum has a daughter from his first marriage. He resides in Spain. In July 2013, Baum announced via Facebook that he is suffering from CKD and initiated a campaign to look for a living kidney donor.

== Bibliography ==
- North of Sunset (2007)
- The American Book Of The Dead (2011)
- Gentleman Reptile (2006)
- The Golden Calf (2008)
- The American Book Of The Dead Part II (2012)
- God's Wife (2012)
- Oscar Caliber Gun (2001)
