= She Loves Me (film) =

- Official release poster
- Directed by: David Horn; Scott Ellis (staging)
- Written by: Joe Masteroff
- Story by: Miklós László
- Based on: She Loves Me by Joe Masteroff Jerry Bock Sheldon Harnick; Parfumerie by Miklós László
- Produced by: Bonnie Comley; Stewart F. Lane; David Horn; Eileen Bernstein; Benjamin Birney; Bill Kabel; Ellen M. Krass; Gio Messale; Mitch Owgang
- Starring: Laura Benanti; Zachary Levi; Gavin Creel; Jane Krakowski
- Cinematography: David Horn
- Edited by: Gary Bradley; Laura Young
- Music by: Jerry Bock (music); Sheldon Harnick (lyrics)
- Production company: Roundabout Theatre Company
- Distributed by: BroadwayHD
- Release date: June 30, 2016
- Running time: 133 minutes
- Country: United States
- Language: English

She Loves Me is a filmed version of the 2016 Broadway revival of the musical of the same name by Joe Masteroff, Jerry Bock, and Sheldon Harnick. The musical itself is based on the 1937 play Parfumerie by Miklós László. The production is staged by Scott Ellis and choreographed by Warren Carlyle. It stars Laura Benanti as Amalia Balash, Zachary Levi as Georg Nowack, Gavin Creel as Steven Kodaly, and Jane Krakowski as Ilona Ritter. The production was performed at Studio 54 from March 17 to June 5, 2016.

The film was broadcast live on BroadwayHD on June 30, 2016, making it the first Broadway production to be live-streamed. It has also aired several times on Great Performances on PBS.

== Synopsis ==
The plot follows Amalia Balash and Georg Nowack, two workers in a Budapest parfumerie in 1934, who despise each other. Unbeknownst to them, however, they have been sending anonymous letters in a lonely hearts club and are slowly falling in love with each other. A subplot involves the on-again, off-again relationship between the dim-witted Ilona Ritter and the cocky Steven Kodaly, two other co-workers at the parfumerie.

== Cast ==
- Laura Benanti as Amalia Balash
- Zachary Levi as Georg Nowack
- Jane Krakowski as Ilona Ritter
- Gavin Creel as Steven Kodaly
- Tom McGowan as Ladislav Sipos
- Byron Jennings as Zoltan Maraczek
- Nicholas Barasch as Arpad Lazlo
- Peter Bartlett as Headwaiter
- Jim Walton as Maraczek's Investigator/Ensemble
- Michael Fatica as Busboy/Ensemble

Cameron Adams, Justin Bowen, Alison Cimmet, Benjamin Eakeley, Gina Ferrall, Jennifer Foote, Andrew Kober, and Laura Shoop appear as additional ensemble members.

== Production ==
The film is executively produced by Stewart F. Lane and Bonnie Comley, the founders of BroadwayHD. While the production is staged by Ellis and Carlyle, the film is directed and shot by David Horn, who had previously worked as a producer and director for Great Performances on PBS. Ten cameras were used to film the performance.

=== Development ===
The idea of making theatre more accessible to patrons not in New York City or who simply did not have the money for a Broadway ticket had been in the works for many years. The inspiration for a live-streamed performance came from the live musicals shown on NBC and Fox such as The Sound of Music, Peter Pan, The Wiz, Grease, and Hairspray.

Comley told The Hollywood Reporter that the goal of the live-streamed performance was, "...to expand the reach of the show outside the physical Broadway theater.”

== Release ==
The film was live-streamed on BroadwayHD on June 30, 2016. It was historic, as it was the first Broadway musical ever to be live-streamed. Following the streamed performance, the film had a one-day theatrical release on December 1 of the same year in a partnership with Fathom Events.

Since then, the film has been aired multiple times as episodes of Great Performances on PBS.

== Reception ==
=== Audience viewership ===
Over sixty countries tuned into the live-streamed performance on BroadwayHD. A Facebook live video showing a teaser of the production garnered 307,000 views and 1,712 shares. Tickets for the event were $9.99, though subscribers of BroadwayHD could watch for free.

=== Critical reception ===
Austin Hill of Onstage Blog described the experience of watching the show live, "...Though I love filmed stage productions, they are always lacking that connection to the event, as though losing the ephemerality of the moment—the precise phenomenological moment of theatre-making. This was somehow different, and I am not sure I understand why. It might be because it was REALLY live…"

=== Accolades ===
The streamed production was nominated for three Shorty Awards for Entertainment, Facebook Live, and Live Streaming Video at the 9th Shorty Awards.
