= She Loves Me (1979 TV play) =

Television play by the BBC

- Genre: Comedy, musical, romance
- Based on: She Loves Me by Joe Masteroff Jerry Bock Sheldon Harnick; Parfumerie by Miklós László
- Written by: Joe Masteroff
- Directed by: Michael Simpson
- Starring: Robin Ellis; Gemma Craven; Peter Sallis; David Kernan; Diane Langton; Derek Smith; Aubrey Woods; Nigel Rathbone
- Composer: Jerry Bock
- Country of origin: United Kingdom

Production
- Producer: Terry Hughes
- Editor: John Sillitto
- Running time: 105 minutes
- Production company: BBC

Original release
- Network: BBC Two
- Release: 13 April 1979

She Loves Me is a 1979 British television play based on the 1963 Broadway musical of the same name. The play was produced by the BBC and screened on 13 April 1979 on BBC Two.

== Plot ==
In 1934 Budapest, Maraczek's Parfumerie employees include Ladislav Sipos, a fretful middle-aged salesman with a family; teenage delivery boy Arpad Laszlo; thirty-something Ilona Ritter, who is having an affair with suave Steven Kodaly; and Georg Nowack, the shy assistant manager ("Good Morning, Good Day"). Mr. Maraczek arrives and soon business is under way ("Thank You, Madam"). Georg informs Sipos that he has been exchanging letters with an anonymous woman he knows only as "Dear Friend".

Maraczek presents a musical leather cigarette case Georg doubts will sell. Maraczek bets with Georg that they will sell one within an hour, but customers are unimpressed. Amalia Balash applies for a job, but they are not hiring. To convince Maraczek, Amalia tactfully convinces a customer that each time it is opened the "musical candy box" gently reminds its owner not to overindulge ("No More Candy"). Impressed, Maraczek hires Amalia.

As months pass, tension grows in the shop. Maraczek is increasingly short-tempered with Georg, and Georg and Amalia bicker constantly. Georg finds solace in his romantic pen pal ("Three Letters"). In December, Georg tells Sipos that tonight he will finally meet his "Dear Friend" ("Tonight At Eight"). Meanwhile, Amalia explains to Ilona that though she has not met "Dear Friend", she knows him well from his letters ("I Don't Know His Name").

Maraczek and Georg argue again; Sipos fears that Georg's successor would not treat him as well as Georg does ("Perspective"). Maraczek insists everyone stay late to decorate for Christmas, but Amalia leaves early for her date. Georg asks to leave too, but Maraczek refuses to let him go; Georg angrily quits. While decorating, Kodaly woos Ilona ("Ilona"), who is resentful that he has broken three dates. She agrees to another date, but when Maraczek closes the store early, Kodaly breaks the date for a prior 9:30 date. She angrily resolves never to fall for a man like him again ("I Resolve"). Preparing for her date, Amalia wonders if "Dear Friend" will like her ("Will He Like Me?").

Maraczek's private investigator reports that Kodaly, not Georg, is having an affair with his wife. Maraczek's wife calls to say she will be out late. Arpad opens the door to Maraczek's office just as Maraczek attempts to shoot himself.

The Cafe Imperiale's head waiter strives to maintain a romantic atmosphere as Amalia awaits her date ("Romantic Atmosphere"). Looking inside, Georg and Sipos are shocked to realize Amalia is Georg's date. Georg sits at Amalia's table without disclosing he is "Dear Friend". They argue, and Georg leaves. As the cafe closes, Amalia begs "Dear Friend" not to abandon her ("Dear Friend").

Visiting Maraczek in the hospital, Arpad begs to be promoted to sales clerk ("Try Me"). When Georg visits, Maraczek apologizes for his suspicions, asking Georg to manage the Parfumerie and fire Kodaly.

When Amalia calls out sick, Georg visits her. Fearing his motives, she attempts to get ready for work ("Where's My Shoe"). Urging her to bed, Georg presents her with vanilla ice cream, apologizing for his prior rudeness. Amalia frets that if "Dear Friend" loved her, he would have come. Georg tells her that an older, bald, fat gentleman told him he had to work and could not meet his date. After he leaves, Amalia writes to "Dear Friend" but reflects on Georg's kindness and his gift ("Vanilla Ice Cream").

Georg joyously realizes Amalia loves him ("She Loves Me"). At Maraczek's, Ilona tells Sipos she met Paul, a kindly optometrist, at the library ("A Trip to the Library"). Kodaly bids everyone goodbye ("Grand Knowing You"). The employees help last-minute Christmas shoppers, and Georg and Amalia enjoy each other's company ("Twelve Days to Christmas"). Amalia invites "Dear Friend" to spend Christmas Eve with her and her mother; she invites Georg as well, and he accepts.

Amalia intends to give a musical cigarette box to "Dear Friend"; Georg says he now likes them as a reminder of their first meeting. He admits to thinking he could fall in love with a girl like Amalia; she confesses similar feelings. Georg takes one of her "Dear Friend" letters out of his pocket, reading it aloud. Amalia finally understands that Georg is "Dear Friend" and they kiss ("Finale").

== Cast ==
- Robin Ellis as Georg Nowack
- Gemma Craven as Amalia Balash
- Peter Sallis as Ladislav Sipos
- David Kernan as Steven Kodaly
- Diane Langton as Ilona Ritter
- Derek Smith as Mr. Maraczek
- Aubrey Woods as Head Waiter
- Nigel Rathbone as Arpad Laszlo
- Pamela Cundell as Baroness
- Colin Starkey as Mr. Keller
- Jane Egan as Ensemble
- Lucy Fenwick as Ensemble
- Christina Matthews as Ensemble
- Gill Offord as Ensemble
- Gabrielle Rose as Ensemble
- June Shand as Ensemble
- Buster Skeggs as Ensemble
- Sue Wallace as Ensemble
- Liz Whiting as Ensemble
- Colin Bennett as Ensemble
- Michael Heath as Ensemble
- Anthony McEvoy as Ensemble
- Ray Sumby as Ensemble

== Broadcast ==
The play was originally going to be screened on 22 December 1978 but for unknown reasons the play was postponed to 13 April 1979. It was later broadcast in the USA on PBS on 19 December 1979.

== Reception ==
The play received several positive reviews from critics. The New York Times said "the score is exceptionally good, the equal of Mr. Harnick's and Mr. Bock's Fiorello! or Fiddler on the Roof." The News Journal described it as a musical with style, grace and great performances.

== Music ==
The play uses the same songs used in the 1963 musical stage play adaptation. The songs are "Good Morning, Good Day", "Sounds While Selling/Thank You Madam", "No More Candy", "Three Letters", "Tonight at Eight", "I Don't Know His Name", "Perspective", "Ilona", "I Resolve", "Will He Like Me?", "Romantic Atmosphere", "Tango Tragique", "Dear Friend", "Try Me", "Where's My Shoe", "Ice Cream" "She Loves Me", "A Trip to the Library", "Grand Knowing You", "Twelve Days to Christmas" and "Ice Cream (Reprise)".

== DVD release ==
She Loves Me has been released on DVD, although only a few websites offer the movie on DVD.

== See also ==
- She Loves Me
- She Loves Me (film)
