= You've Got Mail =

1998 film by Nora Ephron

- Theatrical release poster
- Directed by: Nora Ephron
- Screenplay by: Nora Ephron; Delia Ephron
- Based on: The Shop Around the Corner by Samson Raphaelson; Parfumerie by Miklós László
- Produced by: Lauren Shuler Donner; Nora Ephron
- Starring: Tom Hanks; Meg Ryan; Parker Posey; Jean Stapleton; Dave Chappelle; Steve Zahn; Greg Kinnear
- Cinematography: John Lindley
- Edited by: Richard Marks
- Music by: George Fenton
- Production company: Lauren Shuler Donner Productions
- Distributed by: Warner Bros.
- Release date: December 18, 1998
- Running time: 119 minutes
- Country: United States
- Language: English
- Budget: $65 million
- Box office: $250.8 million

You've Got Mail is a 1998 American romantic comedy-drama film directed by Nora Ephron, and starring Tom Hanks and Meg Ryan alongside Parker Posey, Jean Stapleton, Dave Chappelle, Steve Zahn, and Greg Kinnear. Inspired by the 1937 Hungarian play Parfumerie by Miklós László (which had earlier been adapted in 1940 as The Shop Around the Corner and in 1949 as In the Good Old Summertime), the screenplay was co-written by Nora and Delia Ephron. It tells the story of two people in an online romance who are unaware they are also business rivals. It marked the third pairing of Hanks and Ryan, who previously appeared together in Joe Versus the Volcano (1990) and Sleepless in Seattle (1993), the latter directed by Ephron. The film takes its name from the greeting AOL users receive when they get a new email.

Principal photography took place primarily on New York City's Upper West Side, from February to June 1998. You've Got Mail was released in the United States by Warner Bros. on December 18, 1998. The film received mixed reviews from critics and grossed $250.8 million worldwide against a $65 million budget, making it Nora Ephron's highest-grossing film.

== Plot ==
On Manhattan's Upper West Side, Kathleen Kelly runs The Shop Around the Corner, an independent children's bookstore she inherited from her mother. Her romantic partner is Frank Navasky, a left-leaning columnist for The New York Observer. (Note: Frank Navasky was named after Nora Ephron's "friend Victor Navasky, [at the time the] publisher and editorial director of The Nation".) While Frank is devoted to his typewriter, Kathleen prefers her laptop and using her AOL email account, under the screen name "Shopgirl", to exchange messages with "NY152", whom she first met in a chatroom. They agreed not to share specifics about their personal lives, though their exchanges are extensive and intimate with Kathleen confiding how much she misses her mother.

"NY152" is Joe Fox's screen name. (Note: Joe Fox was named "after a book editor and former boyfriend [of Nora Ephron] who died in 1995.") Joe's family runs Fox Books, a major bookstore chain, and he is dating Patricia Eden, an abrasive publisher. Joe is overseeing the opening of a new storefront, just a few blocks from The Shop Around the Corner. Kathleen's three shop assistants—George, Birdie, and Christina—worry the new Fox Books will hurt business, but Kathleen dismisses their concerns.

While on an outing with his 11-year-old aunt Annabel and 4-year-old half-brother Matthew, Joe takes them to Kathleen's store for a storytime event. He and Kathleen meet, but when she expresses disdain for the new Fox Books store, he withholds his last name. Later that week, Kathleen learns Joe's true identity when they meet again at a book publishing party. She accuses Joe of deception and spying, while he belittles her store, earning each other's hostility.

"Shopgirl" emails "NY152" asking for business advice; he urges she fight back. Frank pens a column supporting The Shop Around the Corner that draws widespread attention, leading to talk show appearances, news coverage, and picketing outside Fox Books. Joe is aggravated by the negative publicity, but his father insists it will blow over once they open.

"Shopgirl" and "NY152" arrange to meet at a café. Joe arrives with Kevin, his Fox Books store manager. Kevin peeks through the window and informs Joe that his pen pal is actually his professional nemesis. Joe initially walks away but then joins Kathleen at the table without revealing his online identity. They clash again and Kathleen insults him, invoking her mother, causing Joe to appear very pained and leave.

Kathleen believes "NY152" never showed up. Later that night, "Shopgirl" emails "NY152" to say she finally stood up to an unpleasant person but now feels terrible about it. "NY152" apologizes for not being there and assures Kathleen that anything she said to the other person was probably provoked and likely deserved.

Despite efforts to save The Shop Around the Corner, business steadily declines, while the new Fox Books thrives. Kathleen closes the store and decides she will write children's books. Later, she and Frank amicably end their relationship, laughing at how perfect they are for one another on paper only. Joe breaks up with Patricia and realizes his feelings for Kathleen. He slowly builds a face-to-face relationship with her whilst continuing their online dialogue, without revealing his dual identity.

Eventually, "NY152" arranges another meeting with "Shopgirl". Right before the meetup, Joe sees Kathleen and confesses his feelings, imploring her to forgive his past animosity. Kathleen becomes emotional, hinting she feels the same but cannot forego her connection with "NY152". Upon arriving at the meeting place, Kathleen, hearing a voice calling for Brinkley, "NY152's" dog, realizes it is Joe Fox. She admits she hoped it would be him, and they kiss.

== Cast ==
- Tom Hanks as Joe Fox
- Meg Ryan as Kathleen Kelly
  - Katie Sagona as young Kathleen Kelly
- Parker Posey as Patricia Eden
- Jean Stapleton as Birdie Conrad
- Dave Chappelle as Kevin Jackson
- Steve Zahn as George Pappas
- Dabney Coleman as Nelson Fox, Joe's father
- Greg Kinnear as Frank Navasky
- Heather Burns as Christina Plutzker
- John Randolph as Schuyler Fox, Joe's paternal grandfather
- Deborah Rush as Veronica Grant
- Hallee Hirsh as Annabel Fox, Joe's paternal half-aunt
- Jeffrey Scaperrotta as Matt Fox, Joe's younger paternal half-brother
- Cara Seymour as Gillian Quinn
- Katie Finneran as Nanny Maureen
- Michael Badalucco as Charlie
- Veanne Cox as Miranda Margulies
- Bruce Jay Friedman as Vince Mancini
- Sara Ramirez as Rose, the cashier
- Reiko Aylesworth as a Thanksgiving guest
- Kathryn Meisle as Cecilia Kelly
- Chris Messina as a Fox salesperson
- Jane Adams as TV interviewer Sydney Anne (uncredited)

== Production ==
=== Influences ===
You've Got Mail is based on the 1937 Hungarian play Parfumerie by Miklós László and its adaptations. Parfumerie was later remade as The Shop Around the Corner, a 1940 film by Ernst Lubitsch, which in 1949 was adapted as a musical film, In the Good Old Summertime by Robert Z. Leonard starring Judy Garland and Van Johnson and, finally, in 1963 as a Broadway musical with She Loves Me by Jerry Bock and Sheldon Harnick (composer and lyricist, respectively, of Fiddler on the Roof). You've Got Mail updates that concept with the use of email, and the lead character's workplace is named "The Shop Around the Corner" as a nod to the 1940 film. Influences from Jane Austen's Pride and Prejudice can also be seen in the relationship between Joe Fox and Kathleen Kelly—a reference pointed out by these characters actually discussing Mr. Darcy and Elizabeth Bennet in the film. The joke when Tom Hanks explains that the little girl is really his aunt is taken from Israel Zangwill's story "A New Matrimonial Relation" in The Bachelors' Club (1891).

=== Development ===
The project was initially developed at Turner Pictures under the original title, Shop Around the Corner, the same title as the 1940 film, which was oveseen by Turner Pictures president Amy Pascal, and Nora Ephron was hired to direct after making the movie Michael, and Lauren Shuler Donner hired to produce. In 1996, the project was then inherited by Warner Bros. Pictures after Time Warner acquired Turner Broadcasting System. The title was changed to You Have Mail, before settling on You've Got Mail midway through filming.

=== Casting ===
Julia Roberts declined the role of Kathleen Kelly because she lacked confidence in the quality of the romcom scripts of the time.

=== Filming ===
Principal photography took place primarily on New York City's Upper West Side. Principal photography began on February 25, 1998, and completed on June 8, 1998.

Delia Ephron, recalling the film's bookstore setting, said, "Once we decided that she would be an independent bookstore owner, the reason we made it a children's bookstore is, I think, we always tried to make movies as personal as we could. To find the thing in it that was personal. And we grew up loving children's books more than anything." Nora Ephron similarly remarked in the film's audio commentary, "This was something that was very important to us—that there be first editions of old children's books. It's part of what made this a serious bookstore. We wanted to sell the idea that this was a place that really cared about the history of children's literature." Additionally, Ephron had Ryan and Burns rehearse and work at Books of Wonder, an independent New York City children's bookstore, for a week prior to filming in order to get them into character. The filming location used as the bookstore was at 106 West 69th Street, at that time Maya Shaper's Cheese and Antique Shop.

Michael Palin was initially cast as a reclusive novelist based on Thomas Pynchon, but his scenes were cut from the film.

=== Website ===
The film's original website remained live until at least May 10, 2018. The website has proven to be fodder for criticism of web design from the 1990s.

== Soundtrack ==
A soundtrack was released on December 1, 1998, featuring a mixture of classics from the 1950s and 1970s, particularly the work of Harry Nilsson, as well as new original recordings and covers. The score to the film was written by English composer George Fenton.

== Reception ==
=== Box office ===
You've Got Mail grossed $115.8 million in the United States and Canada and $135 million in other territories, for a worldwide total of $250.8 million. It is Nora Ephron's highest-grossing film. The film debuted at number one at the North American box office—above The Prince of Egypt—earning $18.4 million in its opening weekend.

=== Critical response ===
On the review aggregator website Rotten Tomatoes, You've Got Mail holds an approval rating of 70% based on 89 reviews, with an average rating of 6.3/10. The website's critics consensus reads, "Great chemistry between the leads made this a warm and charming delight." Metacritic, which uses a weighted average, assigned the film a score of 58 out of 100, based on 19 critics, indicating "mixed or average" reviews. Audiences surveyed by CinemaScore gave the film a grade of A− on a scale of A to F.

Roger Ebert of the Chicago Sun-Times gave the film three-out-of-four stars and lauded the "immensely lovable" main characters. Janet Maslin of The New York Times also praised the film, writing of the leads, "Ms. Ryan plays her role blithely and credibly this time, with an air of freshness, a minimum of cute fidgeting and a lot of fond chemistry with Mr. Hanks. And he continues to amaze. Once again, he fully inhabits a new role without any obvious actorly behavior, to the point where comparisons to James Stewart ... really cannot be avoided." Lael Loewenstein of Variety similarly called it a "winning romantic comedy" and praised the chemistry between Hanks and Ryan, writing, "they show why they are two of Hollywood's most bankable and, in many ways, most traditional stars." and Gene Shalit on the Today Show called the film "exciting and enchanting".

Nathan Rabin of The A.V. Club disliked the film, and wrote: "Takes almost two self-infatuated, smarmy, condescending, cringe-inducingly sentimental hours to reach its pre-ordained conclusion" and called the film "almost unwatchably saccharine, representing pretty much everything wrong with today's big-budget, high-concept Hollywood filmmaking." Michael O'Sullivan of The Washington Post criticized the film's use of product placement and its overly "adorable" characters, writing, "For some reason, this film made me feel like a Christmas goose being fattened for slaughter. Its force-fed diet of whimsy cloyed long before the eagerly anticipated romantic payoff arrived to put me out of my misery." Maitland McDonagh also criticized the incongruous product placement "In a film about the ruthless corporate destruction of small businesses, it's hard not to flinch at the prominent placement accorded IBM, Starbucks, and AOL logos." Rolling Stone later included You've Got Mail in their list of "Most Egregious Product Placements in Movie & TV History" for the film's frequent use of AOL trademarks (AOL would later merge with film distributor Warner Bros' parent company Time Warner to form AOL Time Warner in 2000).

=== Accolades ===
Award	Date of ceremony	Category	Recipient(s)	Result	Ref.
American Comedy Awards	February 7, 1999	Funniest Actress in a Motion Picture (Leading Role)	Meg Ryan	Nominated	
American Comedy Awards	February 7, 1999	Funniest Actor in a Motion Picture (Leading Role)	Tom Hanks	Nominated	
Blockbuster Entertainment Awards	June 16, 1999	Favorite Actor - Comedy/Romance	Tom Hanks	Nominated	
Blockbuster Entertainment Awards	June 16, 1999	Favorite Actress - Comedy/Romance	Meg Ryan	Won	
Blockbuster Entertainment Awards	June 16, 1999	Favorite Supporting Actor - Comedy/Romance	Greg Kinnear	Won	
BMI Film & TV Awards	January 1, 1999	BMI Film Music Award	George Fenton	Won	
Golden Globe Awards	January 24, 1999	Best Actress in a Motion Picture – Musical or Comedy	Meg Ryan	Nominated	
Kids' Choice Awards	May 1, 1999	Favorite Movie Actress	Meg Ryan	Nominated	
Satellite Awards	January 17, 1999	Best Actress – Musical or Comedy	Meg Ryan	Nominated	
Satellite Awards	January 17, 1999	Best Film – Musical or Comedy	You've Got Mail	Nominated	
Satellite Awards	January 17, 1999	Best Original Song	"Anyone at All"	Nominated	

== False alternate ending ==
Many viewers of the film recall a non-existent alternate ending in which Joe and Kathleen work out a compromise, and she is seen reading to children in a smaller version of The Shop Around the Corner located inside Fox Books. In 2018, an article about You've Got Mail by film critic Amanda Hess was published in The New York Times which mentioned this ending, leading the Times to later publish a correction. No such ending was ever written or filmed, as has been confirmed by editor Shelly Westerman and screenplay co-writer Delia Ephron. This is regarded as a common example of the Mandela effect, a collective false memory.

== Remake ==
In November 2026, Warner Bros. was announced to develop a modern remake of the film. It will be directed by Jason Orley, who will also provide rewrites from a draft by Deborah Kaplan and Harry Elfont.
