= Miklós László =

Hungarian-American playwright

Miklós László Miklós Leitner
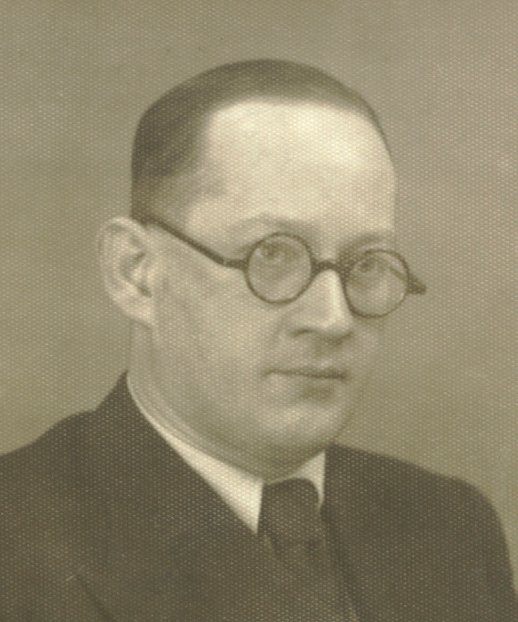
- Born: Nicholaus Leitner; May 20, 1903; Budapest, Austria-Hungary
- Died: April 19, 1973 (aged 69); Astoria, Queens, New York, U.S.
- Occupations: Playwright, screenwriter
- Spouse(s): Florence Herrman (m. 1939; his death 1973)
- Writing career
- Years active: 1933-1998

Miklós László (May 20, 1903 – April 19, 1973; born Nicholaus Leitner) was a Hungarian-born American playwright and screenwriter.

He is best known for his play Illatszertár, also known as Parfumerie, which was later used as the storyline for three movies: The Shop Around the Corner, In the Good Old Summertime, and You've Got Mail, which was released posthumously. The play was also adapted for the Broadway stage as the musical She Loves Me.

== Early life ==
Nicholaus Leitner was born in Budapest, Austro-Hungarian Empire, on May 20, 1903, to a family of German Jewish descent. Emperor Franz Josef ruled the Austro-Hungarian Empire, and the Great War was still a few years away. The name "László" was chosen for the Leitner family. No particular reason is known other than that it was a well-known Hungarian name and that it was similar to the original family name "Leitner". Henrik and Ilona Fischer Leitner therefore gave to their infant son on his birth certificate the name Leitner László Nicholaus, last name first as is the custom in Hungary.

Nicholaus grew up in Budapest. His family was in the entertainment business, and he naturally gravitated toward a career in entertainment as well. He rubbed elbows with the Hungarian literati of the day including the playwright Ferenc Molnár, whose most famous work Liliom is known to English-speaking audiences as the Rodgers and Hammerstein musical Carousel. Niki was encouraged to put pen to paper and as a young adult began to produce his own little one-scene plays for the various small theatres and cabarets around the city. These “little plays” became his fame and provided spare income to support his “young man with possibilities” lifestyle. It even afforded him the time to work on some more comprehensive works which he would eventually complete as full multi-act plays.

His father continued to do very well with his own business endeavours and at one-point, anecdotal information described the father as one of the wealthiest men in Hungary. But tragically, poor management, high living and wild spending brought the family to total destitution. And then unexpectedly his father died and Nicholas was left as the sole provider for his mother and eight siblings. Writing was not sufficient to feed a family and pay the bills, so Niki turned to a host of jobs, none too small to earn the pay that was necessary to keep the family afloat. As he told it, he worked as a candy-maker, collar salesman, necktie agent, script typist, clerk and even worked as a labourer in a petroleum factory while his siblings grew up and gradually took responsibility for their own lives and livelihoods.

His first three-act play, A legboldogabb ember, lit. 'The Happiest Man', a play about an embittered factory worker and the dream world to which he escapes for solace, won him the prestigious Hungarian Royal Academy Award for Literature in 1934, the Hungarian equivalent of the American Pulitzer Prize.

== Immigration to America ==
László could have stayed in Hungary, but World War II was approaching, and many Hungarians of Jewish extraction, recognizing the approaching dangers, emigrated. So in 1938, Nicholaus László embarked for the USA.

He established himself within the Hungarian community on the Lower East Side of New York City during the Great Depression. Using the name Miklós László, he gained recognition within the Hungarian-speaking community of Yorkville, Manhattan. However, this local recognition among Hungarian speakers differed from achieving success as a playwright for a broader English-speaking American audience.

Miklós, also known as "Miki", would need to further pursue his opportunities. In the fall of 1939 he married Florence Herman, an aspiring young actress and the daughter of a successful local entrepreneur, a Cunard Line travel agent, landlord and financial exchange merchant. On December 28, 1944, he completed the transition and became a fully naturalized American citizen and officially adopted the single name now most frequently referenced, Miklós László.

During his lifetime he had numerous writing contracts with MGM. A few projects became major motion pictures, while most did not. The writing experiments and the accompanying advances though kept Miki and wife Florence able to make ends meet, barely. Again, other jobs became a necessity.

Miklós László died in New York City in 1973 at the age of 69. His wife Florence died in 1987.

== Parfumerie ==
The most famous of all his plays during this time and which was later produced as a motion picture was Illatszertár, known in English as Parfumerie. It had premiered at the Pest Theatre in Budapest in 1937, and shortly after László came to New York. The play was adapted as a movie script by Samson Raphaelson and became the Ernst Lubitsch motion picture The Shop Around the Corner (1940), starring James Stewart, Frank Morgan, and Margaret Sullavan. A few years later it was re-filmed as In the Good Old Summertime (1949), a semi-musical showcase for Judy Garland, starring Garland, Van Johnson, and S. Z. Sakall.

In 1963, the play was produced as a full Broadway musical called She Loves Me, with book by Joe Masteroff. She Loves Me had songs by Sheldon Harnick and Jerry Bock (Fiorello!, Fiddler on the Roof, The Apple Tree) and was nominated for 5 Tony Awards including Best Musical, with Jack Cassidy winning for Best Performance by a Featured Actor in a Musical. She Loves Me is also often referred to as the "Ice Cream Musical" because of a signature song and performance by Barbara Cook. She Loves Me was revived in 1993 by the Roundabout Theatre Company and ran for 354 performances. It was nominated for 9 Tony Awards, including Best Revival of a Musical as well as in all four acting categories, with Boyd Gaines winning for Best Performance by a Leading Actor in a Musical. It was revived again in 2016 for a limited run at Studio 54 from February to July and was nominated for 8 Tony Awards, including Best Revival of a Musical, with David Rockwell winning for Best Scenic Design of a Musical.

In 1998, the play was used once again as the inspiration for a screenplay, by Nora Ephron, which became the motion picture You've Got Mail, with Tom Hanks and Meg Ryan.

In 2001, the László/Raphaelson MGM script was adapted for the stage in France and was produced as a straight play La Boutique au Coin de la Rue ("The Shop at the Corner of the Street"). This production was a faithful adaptation of the MGM movie script The Shop Around the Corner and ran for the 2002 season in Paris at the Théâtre Montparnasse winning top honors. The production garnered five Molière Awards, the French equivalent of the American Tony Award — for Best New Play, Best Adaptation of a Foreign Work, Best Director, Best Set Design, and Best Lighting.

In June 2004 Parfumerie was produced for the first time as an English-language play by the theater department of the University of Illinois, after James Berton Harris, the director of the department's Summerfest, found a translation of the original script in papers donated by Samson Raphaelson to the university's Rare Book and Special Collections Library.

A new adaptation of the play by E. P. Dowdall, a nephew of Miklós László, premiered in December 2009 as The Perfume Shop at the Asolo Repertory Theatre in Sarasota, Florida. Almost simultaneously, a script adapted by Adam Pettle and Brenda Robins was produced by the Soulpepper Theatre Company in Toronto.

== Other plays and screenplays ==
In the early 1940s he also wrote a screenplay Katherine which was picked up by MGM and became the motion picture The Big City (1948) starring Margaret O'Brien, Robert Preston, Danny Thomas and George Murphy. The screenplay examined the diversity and underlying unity of human cultures in the microcosm of a New York City adoption.

Only one other of Miklós László's plays was ever widely produced in the Americas. Entitled St. Lazar's Pharmacy it is the story of a man learning the lessons of the true value of “home” as compared to the many lures of a false and deceiving world of empty promises. The play starred famed actress Miriam Hopkins and toured all over Canada and the United States. (The Juilliard library lists a handwritten manuscript of "St. Lazar's Pharmacy" in its catalogue of collections.)

Perhaps the reason we have not seen very many of the plays Miklós László wrote in his early career and during his life is because they were never effectively translated from Hungarian to English and as such have never really had an opportunity to be viewed by American audiences as they were viewed in the country of his birth. Translations exist for many of his works in French and even German, but few in English. The original Hungarian works continue to be performed to this day throughout Hungary on an ongoing basis.
