= She Loves Me (original Broadway cast recording) =

She Loves Me – The Original Cast Album

Cast recording by various artists
- Released: 1963
- Recorded: 1963
- Label: MGM Records

She Loves Me, subtitled The Original Cast Album, is an album containing a recording of the 1963 Broadway musical She Loves Me made by its original cast. The album was released in the same year by MGM Records.

== Critical reception ==
Professional ratings
Review scores
Source	Rating
AllMusic	3/5 stars
Billboard	(no rating)

In a retrospective review on AllMusic, William Ruhlmann notes that although the musical "was not a stage success", "the score has been well remembered [...], especially for Barbara Cook's performance." He also notes that the album was originally issued on two LP records and provided a "near-complete recording" of the stage score.

Back in 1963, Billboard picked the album for its "Spotlight" section, commending the "de luxe packaging" "which re-create[d] the giant-sized score of some two dozen tunes, almost twice that of a normal Broadway outing" and its "special price of $6.95 to $7.95" as "an added sales incentive".

== Chart performance ==
The album reached number 50 on the Billboard's Top LPs chart.

== Track listing ==
LP – MGM Records E4118 OC-2 (mono), SE4118 OC-2 (stereo)

All lyrics are written by Sheldon Harnick; all music is composed by Jerry Bock.

Side 1
No.	Title	Artist(s)	Length
1.	"Prelude" and "Good Morning, Good Day"	Ralph Williams, Nathaniel Frey, Barbara Baxley, Jack Cassidy, Daniel Massey	4:40
2.	"Sounds While Selling"	Daniel Massey, Nathaniel Frey, Jack Cassidy, Marion Brash, Peg Murray, Trude Adams	2:21
3.	"Days Gone By"	Ludwig Donath	2:18
4.	"No More Candy"	Barbara Cook	1:24
5.	"Three Letters"	Barbara Cook, Daniel Massey	2:32
6.	"Tonight at Eight"	Daniel Massey	1:54
7.	"I Don't Know His Name"	Barbara Cook, Barbara Baxley	4:10
8.	"Perspective"	Nathaniel Frey	3:13

Side 2
No.	Title	Artist(s)	Length
1.	"Goodbye, Georg"	Barbara Baxley, Nathaniel Frey, Jack Cassidy, Ralph Williams, and chorus	1:17
2.	"Will He Like Me?"	Barbara Cook	4:17
3.	"Ilona"	Jack Cassidy	3:23
4.	"I Resolve"	Barbara Baxley	2:20
5.	"Romantic Atmosphere"	Wood Romoff	3:31
6.	"Tango Tragique"	Daniel Massey	3:06
7.	"Dear Friend"	Barbara Cook	2:56

Side 3
No.	Title	Artist(s)	Length
1.	"Overture to Act II"	Orchestra	4:18
2.	"Try Me"	Ralph Williams	3:22
3.	"Where's My Shoe?"	Daniel Massey	2:14
4.	"Ice Cream"	Barbara Cook	3:07
5.	"She Loves Me"	Daniel Massey	2:50

Side 4
No.	Title	Artist(s)	Length
1.	"A Trip to the Library"	Barbara Baxley	4:41
2.	"Grand Knowing You"	Jack Cassidy	2:40
3.	"Twelve Days to Christmas"	Jo Wilder, Gino Conforti, Joe Ross, and company	3:33
4.	"Ice Cream" (Reprise)	Barbara Cook, Daniel Massey	2:11

== Personnel ==
- Harold Hastings – musical director

== Charts ==
Chart (1963)	Peak position
US Billboard Top LPs	50

== Awards ==
Year	Award type	Categories	Results	Ref.
1964	Grammy Awards	Best Score from an Original Cast Show Album	Won	
