= Tom McGowan =

American actor

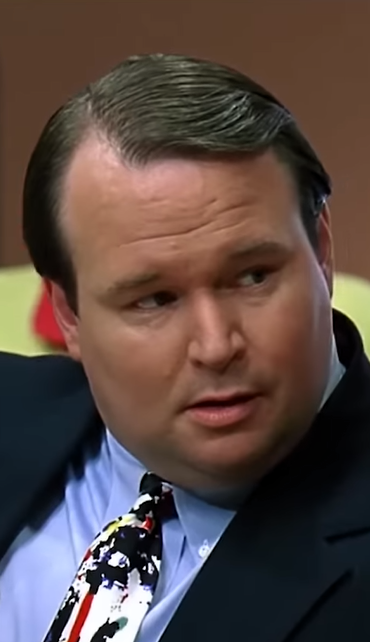
- McGowan in Bean (1997)
- Born: Thomas McGowan; July 26, 1959 (age 67); Belmar, New Jersey, U.S.
- Education: Hofstra University (BFA); Yale University (MFA)
- Occupation: Actor
- Years active: 1991–present
- Spouse: Cathy
- Children: 2

Thomas McGowan (born July 26, 1959) is an American actor. He first became known for his stage career both on and off Broadway. In 1991, he was nominated for the Tony Award for Best Actor in a Play and the Drama Desk Award for Outstanding Actor in a Play for his Broadway debut performance in La Bête. In 2011, McGowan was chosen to step into the role of the Wizard in Wicked on Broadway. In 2014, McGowan starred in Harvey Fierstein's original Broadway play Casa Valentina which was nominated for the Tony Award for Best Play. Since then he has appeared in the Broadway revivals of She Loves Me (2016) and Kiss Me, Kate (2019).

He is also known for his recurring role on the Emmy Award winning NBC show Frasier, as KACL station manager Kenny Daly. He has also appeared on a variety of shows including Everybody Loves Raymond, The Practice, ER, Desperate Housewives, Curb Your Enthusiasm, Modern Family, Veep and The Good Fight.

He has appeared in films such as Heavyweights, Sleepless in Seattle, The Birdcage, As Good as It Gets, True Crime, Ghost World, and Bad Santa.

== Career ==
On Broadway he appeared in La Bête (1991), for which he received a Tony Award nomination for Best Actor in a Play. Off Broadway, he won an Obie Award for his performance in Nicky Silver's play The Food Chain. He played the role of Pat Finley in the 1995 movie Heavyweights and the role of Patrick Fisher in the 2006 movie Twelve and Holding. He also portrayed Wally in the unaired 1997 Dilbert pitch pilot.

McGowan has been performing the role of The Wonderful Wizard of Oz in various companies of Wicked since 2009. He first played the Wizard in the original Second National Tour production, beginning March 7, 2009. He finished with the touring company on December 6, 2009, transferring to the San Francisco production, playing the Wizard from December 22, 2009, through September 5, 2010, when the production closed. He then returned to the Second National Tour, resuming performances on January 11, 2011, and concluding his performances on the tour on April 17, 2011. McGowan joined the Broadway company of the show from May 3, 2011, through February 5, 2012. Thereafter, he moved to the show's First National Tour, playing the role from August 2012 through April 2013. He has since performed the role on Broadway intermittently, including from August 13, 2013, through February 22, 2014, and onward from July 15, 2014. McGowan played the role in the West End production of the show from September 21, 2015, through March 12, 2016.

McGowan was in the 2016 Broadway revival of She Loves Me as Ladislav Sipos. McGowan played the character Falstaff in Shakespeare's The Merry Wives of Windsor at San Diego's The Old Globe Theatre in August 2023.

== Personal life ==
McGowan grew up in Belmar, New Jersey. He graduated from Belmar's St. Rose High School in 1977. Upon graduation from high school, he attended Hofstra University and the Yale School of Drama, from which he graduated with a Master of Fine Arts degree in 1988. He and his wife, Cathy, have a son, Mark (born May 5, 1992) and a daughter, Mary (born February 10, 1995).

== Filmography ==
=== Film ===
Year	Title	Role	Notes
1992	The Last of the Mohicans	Rich Merchant	
1992	Captain Ron	Bill	
1993	Searching for Bobby Fischer	Reporter	
1993	Sleepless in Seattle	Keith	
1994	Mrs. Parker and the Vicious Circle	Alexander Woollcott	
1995	Heavyweights	Pat Finley	
1996	The Birdcage	Harry Radman	
1997	Cold Around the Heart	Gun Store Man	
1997	As Good as It Gets	Maitre D'	
1997	Bean: The Movie	Walter Huntley	
1999	True Crime	Tom Donaldson	
2000	The Family Man	Bill	
2001	Ghost World	Joe	
2003	Bad Santa	Harrison	
2004	Dog Gone Love	Star	
2004	After the Sunset	Ed	
2005	12 and Holding	Patrick Fisher	
2009	Just Peck	Mr. Kuhner	
2015	Freeheld	William Johnson	
2016	She Loves Me	Ladislav Sipos	Filmed production

=== Television ===
Year	Title	Role	Notes
1992–93	Down the Shore	Eddie Cheever	29 episodes
1994	Coach	Edgar	Episode: "Be a Good Sport"
1994	Monty	Clifford Walker	13 episodes
1996	The Show	George Hart	4 episodes
1996–97	Sabrina, The Teenage Witch	Principal Larue	3 episodes
1996–2004	Everybody Loves Raymond	Bernie	17 episodes
1997	Honey, I Shrunk the Kids: The TV Show	Randy	Episode: "Honey, I Shrunk the Science Dude"
1998	The Practice	William Wright	Episode: "The Pursuit of Dignity"
1998–2004	Frasier	Kenny Daly	42 episodes
1999	Snoops	Dirty Marty	2 episodes
1999–2000	ER	Joe Bernero	2 episodes
2000	Bull	Johnny Walker	Episode: "In The Course of Human Events"
2001	Welcome to New York	Joe Gaffigan	Episode: "The Brother"
2001	King of the Hill	David (voice)	Episode: "Hank's Back Story"
2001	The Huntress	Ollie Drake	Episode: "With Great Power"
2001	Curb Your Enthusiasm	John Tyler	Episode: "The Thong"
2003	The Pitts	Officer Peltz	Episode: "Squarewolves"
2003	Judging Amy	Mr. Moran	Episode: "Picture of Perfect"
2004	Complete Savages	Reverend Dave	Episode: "Carnival Knowledge"
2004	Oliver Beene	Bob "Simon Says" Brooks	Episode: "Catskills"
2004	8 Simple Rules	Frank	Episode: "Thanksgiving Guest"
2005	Reba	Inspector	Episode: "As Is"
2005–07	The War at Home	Joe	11 episodes
2006	Just Legal	Jeff Jacobs	Episode: "The Bar"
2006	Play Nice	Performer	TV movie
2007	Hannah Montana	Leo	Episode: "Don't Stop 'Til You Get the Phone"
2007	Brothers & Sisters	Luther Reeves	Episode: "An American Family"
2007	Boston Legal	Noris Milk	Episode: "Green Christmas"
2008	Greek	Fred	Episode: "47 Hours and 11 Minutes"
2008	CSI: Crime Scene Investigation	Mark	Episode: "Two and a Half Deaths"
2009	Eli Stone	Donnie Griffiths	Episode: "Sonoma"
2010	Desperate Housewives	Mayor Franklin	Episode: "Down the Block There's a Riot"
2011	Hot in Cleveland	Robert	Episode: "Love Thy Neighbor"
2012	Modern Family	Principal Roth	Episode: "Schooled"
2015	Veep	Congressman Moyes	Episode: "B/ill"
2017	The Good Fight	Jax Rindell	5 episodes
2020	One Royal Holiday	Ed Jordan	TV movie
2022	American Auto	Ed	Episode: "Earnings Call"
2024	Doctor Odyssey	Burt	Episode: "Pilot"
2025	Sub/liminal		

== Theatre ==
Year	Title	Role	Venue	Notes
1988	Coriolanus	Ensemble	The Public Theater, Off-Broadway	
1989	The Winter's Tale	Clown	The Public Theater, Off-Broadway	
1991	La Bête	Valere	Eugene O'Neill Theatre, Broadway	
1995	The Food Chain	Otto	Westside Theatre, Off-Broadway	
1997	Ivanov	Mikhail Borkin	Vivian Beaumont Theater, Broadway	
1998-2000	Chicago	Amos Hart (replacement)	Shubert Theatre (Broadway)	
2002	A Few Stout Individuals	Adam Badeau	Peter Norton Space, Off-Broadway	
2009	Wicked	The Wizard of Oz (replacement)	US Tour	
2009-2010	Wicked	The Wizard of Oz	Orpheum Theatre	
2011	Wicked	The Wizard of Oz (replacement)	US Tour	
2011-2014	Wicked	The Wizard of Oz (replacement)	The Gershwin Theatre, Broadway	
2014	Casa Valentina	Bessie	Samuel J. Friedman Theatre, Broadway	
2014-2015	Wicked	The Wizard of Oz (replacement)	The Gershwin Theatre, Broadway	
2015-2016	Wicked	The Wizard of Oz (replacement)	Apollo Victoria Theatre, West End	
2016	She Loves Me	Ladislav Sipos (replacement)	Studio 54, Broadway	
2017-2018	Wicked	The Wizard of Oz (replacement)	US Tour	
2019	Kiss Me, Kate	Gangster / Second Man (replacement)	Studio 54, Broadway	
2023	The Merry Wives of Windsor	Falstaff	The Old Globe, San Diego	
2024	Wicked	The Wizard of Oz (replacement)	US Tour	
2025	Wicked	The Wizard of Oz (replacement)	The Gershwin Theatre, Broadway	

== Awards and nominations ==
Year	Award	Category	Nominated work	Result	Ref.
1991	Tony Awards	Best Actor in a Play	La Bête	Nominated	
1991	Drama Desk Awards	Best Actor in a Play	La Bête	Nominated	
1991	Outer Critics Circle Award	Best Debut Performance	La Bête	Won	
1996	Obie Award	Best Performance	The Food Chain	Won	
