= Kenneth Kamal Scott =

American actor

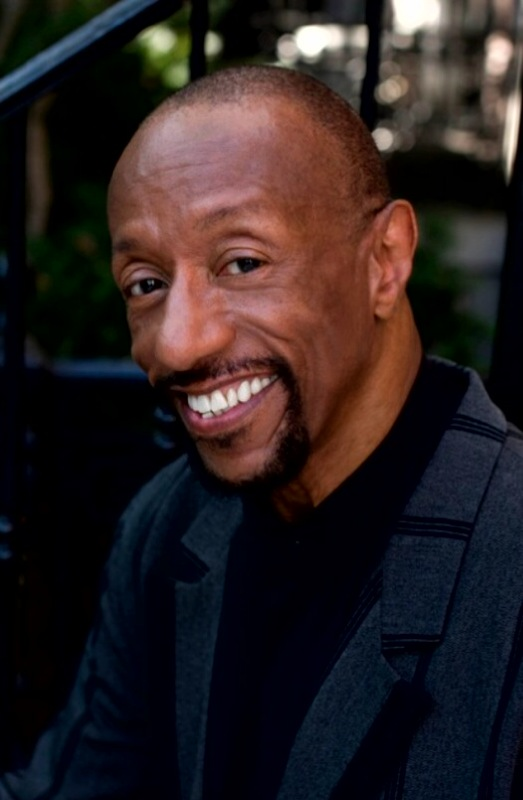
- Kenneth Kamal Scott 2010
- Born: May 3, 1940; Boston, Massachusetts, U.S.
- Died: February 1, 2015 (aged 74); Baltimore, Maryland, U.S.
- Years active: 1945–2014
- Known for: Ballet, Opera, Musical Theatre, Vocal Technique (Bel Canto)
- Spouse(s): 1 Myrna White (1964 – 1972); 2 Etta Russell (2009 – 2015)
- Children: Kenneth; Jonathan
- Website: kennethkamalscott.webs.com/

Kenneth Kamal Scott (3 March 1940 – 1 February 2015) was an American singer, dancer and actor, whose sixty-five-year career had included numerous achievements in a diverse array of genres and settings, including Broadway, jazz, pop, opera, ballet and modern dance.

Scott began his performance career as a singer at age seven, and by the age of eleven began performing at the Apollo Theater as the featured vocalist for musicians such as Earl "Fatha" Hines. Other notable accomplishments include dancing as a member of the Alvin Ailey company in 1959, rising to the starring role of The Wiz in the Broadway company from 1975 to 1979, scoring a hit with the song Bolinas as featured vocalist with Billy Cobham in 1978, and appearances with the Boston Pops under John Williams. In his later career, Scott began exploring and teaching the art of Bel canto singing, including a recital at Merkin Hall at Lincoln Center in October 2004. Scott was on faculty as a vocal instructor at the Mannes College of Music and the New School for Jazz and Contemporary Music, also Morgan State University as Artist in Residence since August 28, 2012. He became a member of Phi Mu Alpha Sinfonia fraternity, Pi Eta chapter, on April 6, 2013.

Scott was diagnosed with liver cancer in July 2014 and died on February 1, 2015.

== Family ==
Scott comes from a musical family. His uncle, Irving Ashby, was a jazz guitarist who performed with the Nat King Cole Trio. His mother, Phyllis Ashby, performed as a big band vocalist, and his father, Leslie Scott, was a successful baritone who played Porgy in the national and international production of Porgy and Bess in 1953 and later played Jake in the 1959 film version. Scott has two sons by his first wife, Myrna White: Kenneth and Jonathan, who was a noted hip-hop artist under the name Dred Scott, and who was married to jazz singer Adriana Evans.

== Broadway and theater credits ==
Scott had performed in numerous Broadway shows including The Wiz, Her First Roman, I'm Solomon, Hallelujah, Baby!, Hello, Dolly! and Golden Boy. Of his lead role in The Wiz, the Los Angeles Times wrote, "Kamal shines. Kamal is a phenomenon...He could star in anything." Scott portrayed Joseph in the debut of the play Black Nativity at Avery Fisher Hall in New York City in 1961 and later performed as the Griot in the Penumbra Theatre Company production of the same play in St. Paul Minnesota in 1999.
