= The Shop Around the Corner =

1940 film by Ernst Lubitsch

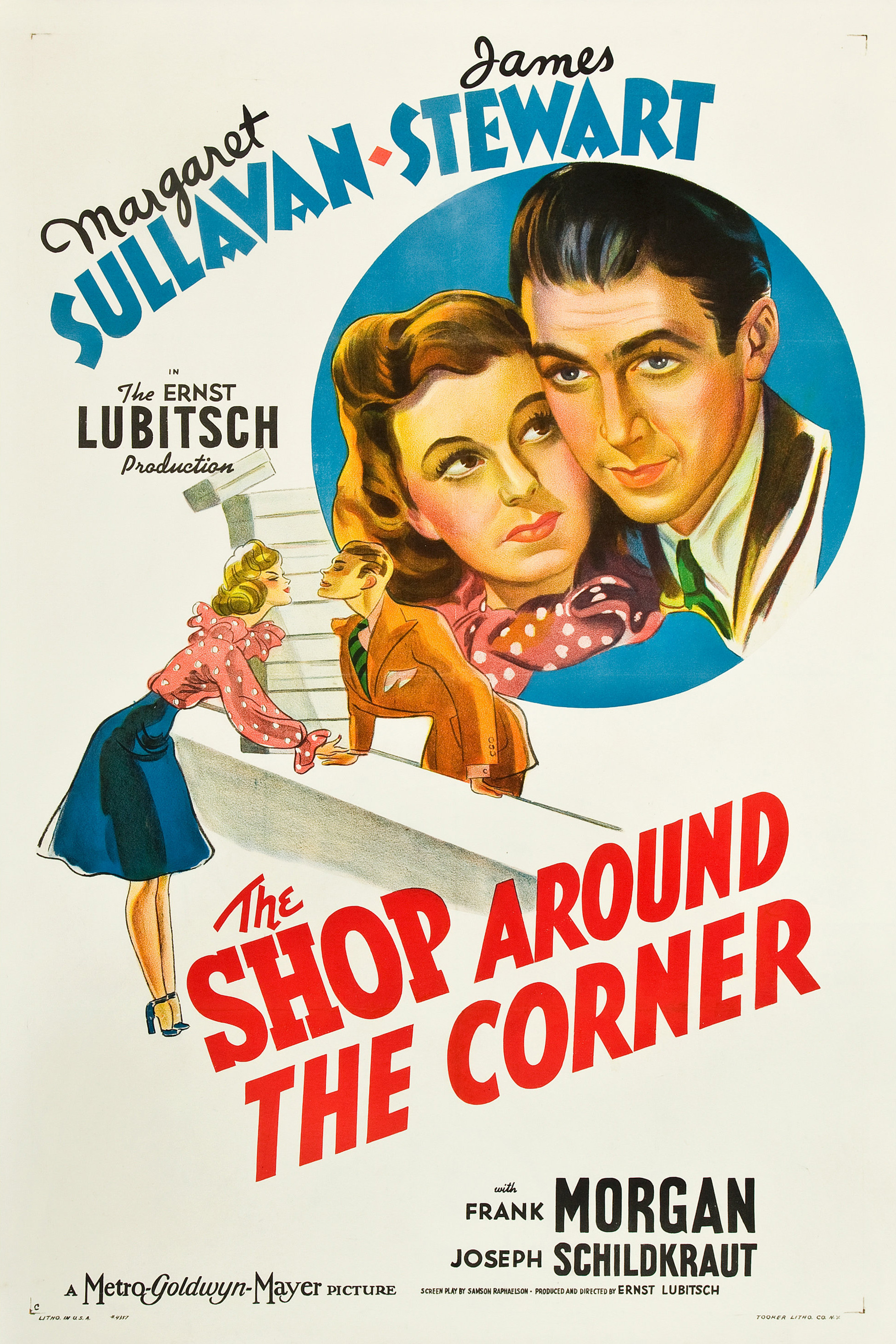
- Theatrical release poster
- Directed by: Ernst Lubitsch
- Screenplay by: Samson Raphaelson; Ben Hecht (uncredited)
- Based on: Parfumerie; 1937 play by Miklós László
- Produced by: Ernst Lubitsch
- Starring: Margaret Sullavan; James Stewart; Frank Morgan; Joseph Schildkraut
- Cinematography: William Daniels
- Edited by: Gene Ruggiero
- Music by: Werner R. Heymann
- Production company: Metro-Goldwyn-Mayer
- Distributed by: Loew's Inc.
- Release date: January 12, 1940
- Running time: 99 minutes
- Country: United States
- Language: English
- Budget: $500,000
- Box office: $1.3 million

The Shop Around the Corner is a 1940 American romantic film produced and directed by Ernst Lubitsch starring Margaret Sullavan, James Stewart, Frank Morgan, and Joseph Schildkraut. The screenplay by Samson Raphaelson is based on the 1937 Hungarian play Parfumerie by Miklós László.

The film is about two employees at a leather goods shop in pre-war Budapest who can barely stand each other, not realizing they are falling in love as anonymous correspondents through their letters. It follows social themes associated with the lives of the middle class.

Though the film did not do well at the box office, it was met with generally positive reviews from film critics. It has since been adapted into three productions. In 1999, The Shop Around the Corner was selected for preservation in the National Film Registry, deemed as "culturally, historically or aesthetically" significant and is also included in the all-time top 100 movies selected by Time magazine.

== Plot ==
This is the story of Matuschek and Company – of Mr. Matuschek and the people who work for him. It is just around the corner from Andrassy Street – on Balta Street, in Budapest, Hungary.

— Opening caption

During the Great Depression, Alfred Kralik is the top salesman at Matuschek and Company, a leathergoods shop in Budapest owned by the high-strung Mr. Hugo Matuschek. Kralik's co-workers include his friend, Pirovitch, a kindly family man; Ferencz Vadas, a two-faced womanizer; saleswoman Ilona Novotny; clerk Flora Kaczek; and Pepi Katona, an ambitious, precocious delivery boy. One morning, Kralik reveals to Pirovitch that he has been corresponding anonymously with an intelligent and cultured woman whose ad he came across in the newspaper. Kralik responded to the ad, wanting to increase his knowledge about culture. As they correspond, they agree to withhold details about their personal lives.

Kralik is Mr. Matuschek's oldest and most trusted employee, but tension starts arising between the two. They get into an argument over Mr. Matuschek's idea to sell a cigarette box that plays "Ochi Chërnye" when opened. After their exchange, Klara Novak enters the gift shop looking for a job. Kralik and Mr. Matuschek tell her there are no openings, but when she is able to sell one of the cigarette boxes as a candy box, Mr. Matuschek hires her. However, she and Kralik do not get along. Mr. Matuschek is becoming irritable because he suspects his wife is having an affair, as she stays out late and requests money from him.

Six months later, as Christmas approaches, Kralik is preparing to meet his mystery correspondent (Novak) for a dinner date. On that day, Mr. Matuschek suddenly demands that everyone stay after work to decorate the shop. Kralik asks to speak with Matuschek in his office and requests the night off. Mr. Matuschek becomes angry, and Kralik implies that he is willing to leave his job. Novak also asks to have the night off, which further infuriates Matuschek. Now, Mr. Matuschek calls Kralik to his office and fires him, giving him one month's pay and a letter of recommendation. No one in the shop understands Mr. Matuschek's actions are related to his suspicions that Kralik is having an affair with his wife. Later, Mr. Matuschek meets with a private investigator who informs him that his wife is having an affair with Vadas, not Kralik. Shocked, Matuschek says, almost to himself, that he was married for 22 years to his wife and proud of her, but "I guess she didn't want to grow old with me." Later, Pepi returns to the shop just in time to prevent Mr. Matuschek from committing suicide by shooting himself.

Meanwhile, Kralik arrives at the Cafe Nizza, where he discovers that his mystery woman is Novak. Despite his disappointment, Kralik goes in and talks with her, pretending he is there to meet Pirovitch. In his mind, Kralik tries to reconcile the cultured woman of his letters with his annoying co-worker, secretly hoping that things might work out with her. Concerned that Kralik's presence will spoil her first meeting with her mystery correspondent, she conducts a continuously abrasive conversation with Kralik, finally calling him a "little insignificant clerk." Deeply insulted, Kralik leaves.

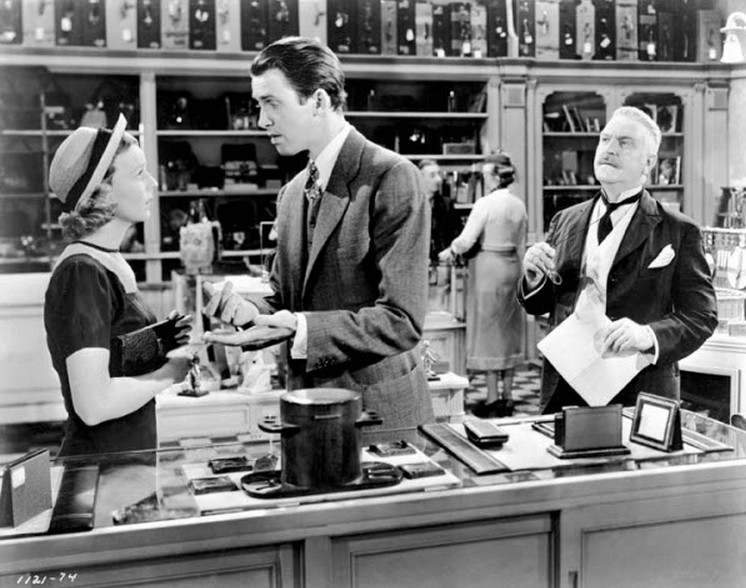
Sullavan, Stewart & Morgan promotional still

Later that night, Kralik goes to the hospital to visit Mr. Matuschek, who apologizes for suspecting him of having an affair with his wife before offering him a job as manager of Matuschek and Company. Grateful to Pepi for saving his life, Mr. Matuschek promotes him to clerk. The next day, Novak calls in sick after her mystery man failed to show, and at Mr. Matuschek's behest, Kralik fires Vadas. That night, when Kralik visits Novak at her apartment, she receives a letter from her correspondent and reads it in front of Kralik, who wrote the letter.

Two weeks later, on Christmas Eve, Matuschek and Company achieves record sales. Kralik and Novak, alone in the shop as they close up, discuss their planned dates for the evening. Novak reveals that she had a crush on Kralik when they first met. She explains that she was initially irritable with him in an effort to pique his interest in her. After pretending to have met Novak's mystery man, Kralik describes him in unflattering terms. When Novak expresses her disappointment, Kralik quotes one of her letters and places a red carnation in his lapel, revealing to her that he is her mystery correspondent. They embrace and kiss.

== Cast ==
- Margaret Sullavan as Klara Novak
- James Stewart as Alfred Kralik
- Frank Morgan as Hugo Matuschek
- Joseph Schildkraut as Ferencz Vadas
- Sara Haden as Flora Kaczek
- Felix Bressart as Pirovitch
- William Tracy as Pepi Katona
- Inez Courtney as Ilona Novotny
- Sarah Edwards as woman customer
- Edwin Maxwell as doctor
- Charles Halton as detective
- Charles Smith as Rudy (Note: In the musical remake In the Good Old Summertime, an uncredited Charles Smith is one of the quartet singing with Judy Garland at the engagement party.)

Uncredited

- Charles Arnt as policeman
- Mabel Colcord as Anna, Klara's aunt
- Mary Carr as Klara's grandmother
- William Edmunds as waiter
- Grace Hayle as plump customer

== Production ==
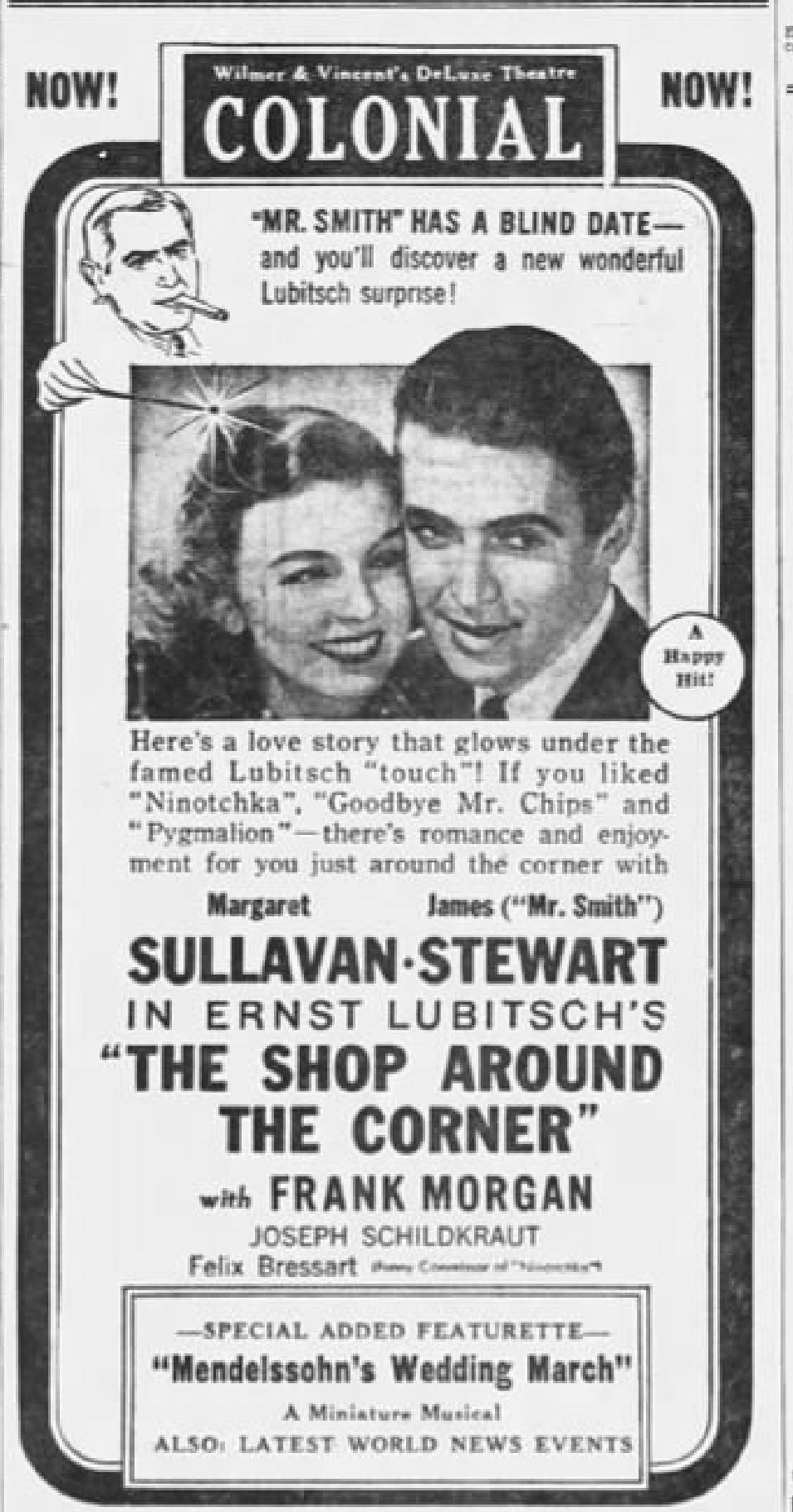
Colonial Theater advertisement

=== Development ===
Ernst Lubitsch purchased the rights to Miklós László's play Parfumerie in 1938. According to Variety, Lubitsch initially planned to create a film adaptation of the play working with Myron Selznick. After Steffie Trondle translated the play into English, Lubitsch worked with screenwriter Samson Raphaelson to write the script from 1938 to 1939. Lubitsch considered it “the best script I have had in a long time in my hands”. Selznick proved unable to fund the production, so the filmmakers turned to other methods. Lubitsch and Selznick pitched the film to Paramount, among other studios, but none were interested in producing it. At the time Hollywood was still hesitant to produce films about the middle class. Studios were also not interested in working with Lubitsch. When Lubitsch's plan did not come to fruition, he decided to work on it after joining MGM. Before he joined MGM, the studio had purchased the rights to the film from him for $62,500. MGM wanted him to produce and direct Ninotchka, to which he agreed on the condition that he also produce and direct The Shop Around the Corner. The studio agreed on the condition that Ninotchka be produced first and assigned a low production budget to The Shop Around the Corner, which meant that the film's screenwriter Samson Raphaelson received a lower salary than usual. In an interview Raphaelson commented that the story was substantially dialogue-based but felt that it did not threaten the film's overall quality. He also claimed that, while the film was based on the play, it was vastly different. In his own words, Lubitsch felt that none of his preceding films had "atmosphere and...characters [that] were truer than in this picture".

=== Casting and production ===
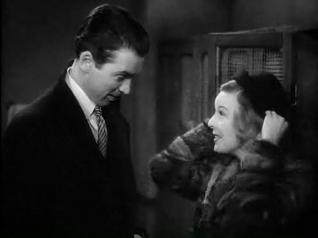
Stewart & Sullavan

Dolly Haas, Margaret Tallichet and Janet Gaynor were each at one point attached to the film before Margaret Sullavan was cast in the lead role alongside James Stewart; neither was available at the time that production was originally set to begin, so Lubitsch decided to postpone the start date. Sullavan and Stewart had worked together before in leading roles. Lubitsch chose to cast Sullavan because he decided the plotline was too risky to use an actress who was less-known. His worries stemmed from thinking audiences might not find the plot interesting enough to watch it. Years later Lubitsch remarked that Sullavan and Stewart worked well together and did not try to out-do each other in their acting. Lubitsch called Sullavan "a tonic for the cast" because of her playfulness between scenes. Raphaelson commented that Stewart's portrayal of Kralik "is one of the great performances in film history". Stewart remarked, "It was wonderful to work with [Lubitsch]. He had such great style and an inspiring sort of comic touch."

Several weeks before filming began, Henry Nordlinger researched leather goods shops so the one in the film could be an accurate portrayal. Lubitsch decided the studio should use "real snow" for the Christmas Eve scenes instead of using fake snow. As a result, thirty tons of ice were shaved to create the effect. Filming began on November 2, 1939, the day after James Stewart completed work on Destry Rides Again. The scenes were shot in the order as they appear. In total, filming took about a month. The final cost was $474,000.

== Release and box office ==
Film trailer

The release trailer features Morgan as Matuschek introducing the other characters and who plays them. At the end he introduces Lubitsch. Film historian Joseph McBride suggests that this connects the film to Lubitsch's early roots as an actor who appeared in films as a shop assistant. The Shop Around the Corner was released on January 12, 1940 and premiered in the Radio City Music Hall on January 25. Upon its release it performed poorly and consequently box office rates were low. At the same time, it received more box office success than Lubitsch's previous film, 1939's Ninotchka. The Shop Around the Corner earned a net profit of $380,000 and has grossed $1.3 million worldwide.

== Reception ==
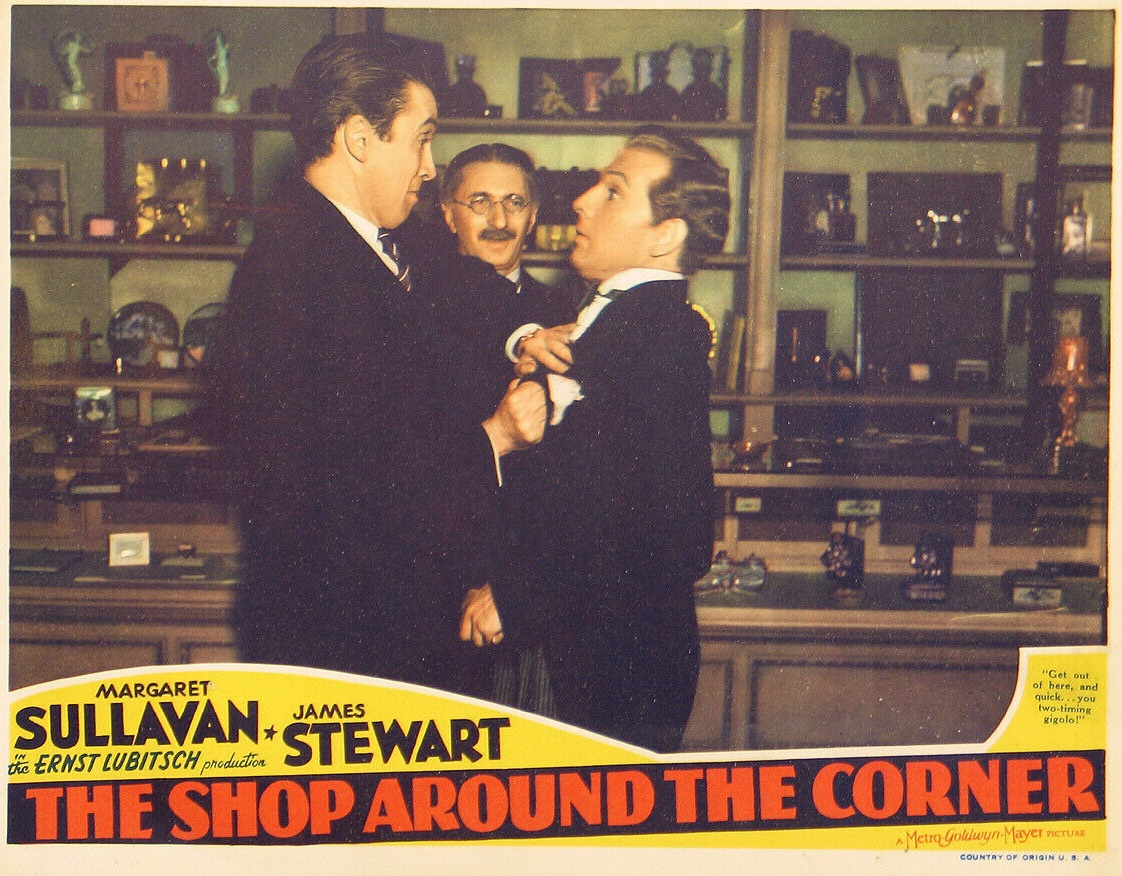
Lobby card

=== Contemporary ===
The Shop Around the Corner received generally positive reviews when it was released. Critics praised the actors for their performance. Photoplay remarked that "Morgan…offers a truly sterling performance, as do Joseph Schildkraut and all the others”. Newsweek also praised Morgan for his performance as Matuschek, commenting that he "handles deftly one of his rare opportunities to play a straight dramatic role”. It also wrote that "James Stewart and Margaret Sullavan are perfectly cast as the youngsters”. The Hollywood Reporter claimed it would "win new audiences for pictures and return many of the old customers who have deserted”. It also called William Daniels' camera work "top class". Variety praised the film's "vivaciousness and piquant humor" and remarked that the "production background and settings—although unpretentious—are excellent, with photography…of top calibre". William R. Weaver of Motion Picture Herald wrote that it "succeeds in being pleasantly entertaining" and that it "seemed to satisfy generally" at a preview showing. According to film historian Thomas Doherty, some critics praised the film for not having as many sexual undertones as Lubitsch's other films. Other audience members were hesitant about its European setting because of World War II, while others felt that Stewart's portrayal of his character was not European enough.

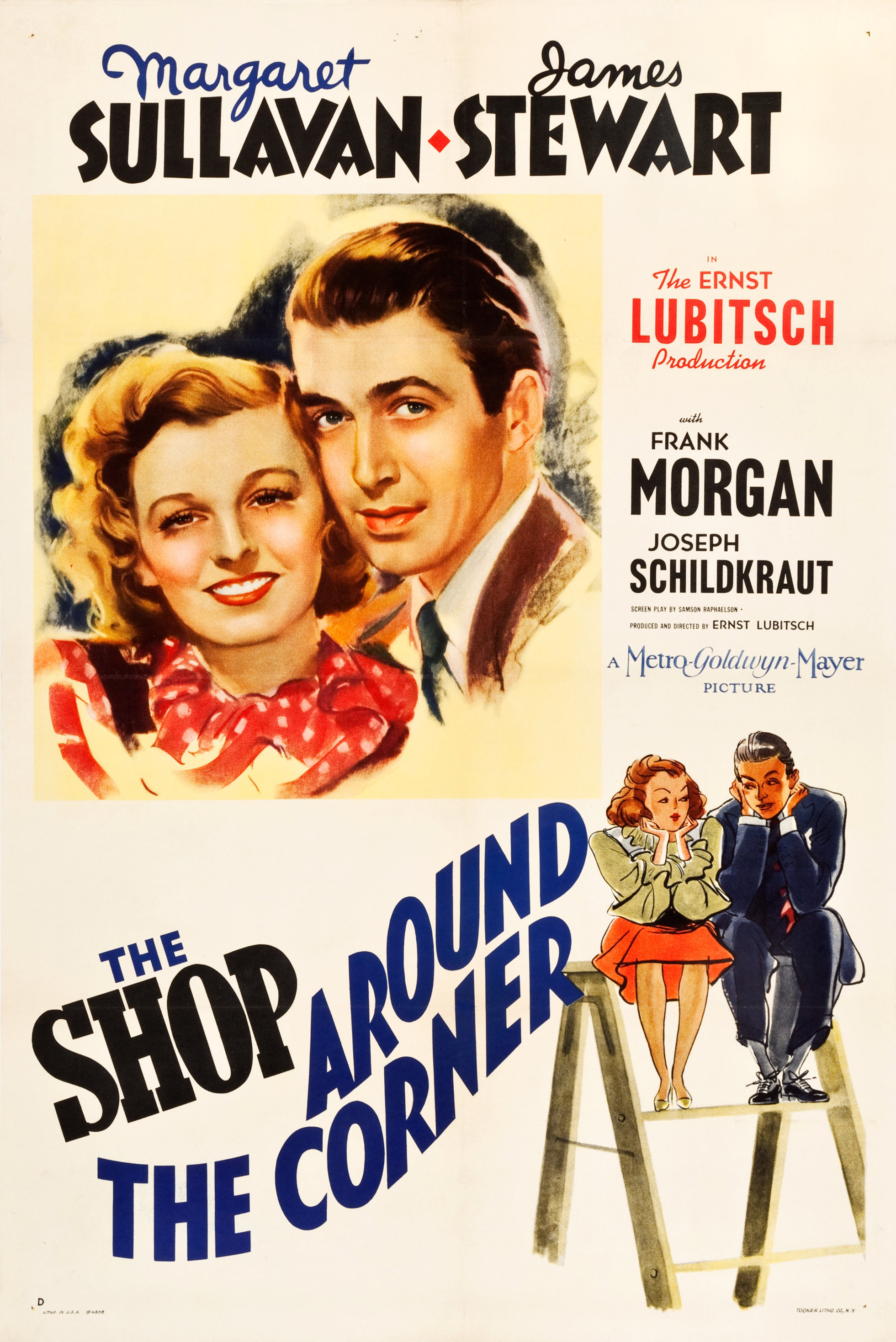
Alternate theatrical release poster

=== Recent ===
The Shop Around the Corner continues to receive critical attention. On the review aggregator website Rotten Tomatoes, the film holds an approval rating of 99% based on 96 reviews, with an average rating of 8.6/10. The website's critics consensus reads: "Deftly directed by Ernst Lubitsch from a smart, funny script by Samson Raphaelson, The Shop Around the Corner is a romantic comedy in the finest sense of the term." Metacritic, which uses a weighted average, assigned the film a score of 96 out of 100, based on 15 critics, indicating "universal acclaim". It ranked as #202 in the British Film Institute's 2012 Sight & Sound critics' poll of the greatest films ever made, having garnered eight critics' votes. The work was also 58th in BBC's 2015 poll of the best American films. According to author Scott Eyman, the film was shown in Paris for a span of 66 weeks in 1986-1987, “making it the most successful reissue ever in France”. In June 2017, The Shop Around the Corner was featured in the film series The Lubitsch Touch hosted by Film Forum.

Dave Kehr argues Lubitsch makes "brilliant deployment of point of view, allowing the audience to enter the perceptions of each character at exactly the right moment to develop maximum sympathy and suspense." Film historian David Thomson considers it to be "Among the greatest of all films...[The movie] is a treasury of hopes and anxieties...It is a comedy so good it frightens us for them. The café conversation may be the best meeting in American film." David Mermelstein of The Wall Street Journal says the film "remains irresistible thanks to an outstanding cast and Lubitsch’s gossamer touch”. Kevin Bahr adds, "By returning to a simple European shop around the corner, Lubitsch was finally able to express on film what was most important to him in life: Friendship, work, and love.” Ty Burr feels that "what makes Shop timeless…is the specificity of its setting".

== Adaptations and remakes ==
=== Adaptations and awards ===
The Shop Around the Corner was dramatized in two half-hour broadcasts of The Screen Guild Theater. The first aired on September 29, 1940, and starred Sullavan, Stewart, and Morgan in their respective roles; in this version the adultery aspect was removed. The performance was held to benefit the Motion Picture Relief Fund. The second broadcast aired on February 26, 1945, with Van Johnson and Phyllis Thaxter. It was also dramatized as a one-hour program on Lux Radio Theater's June 23, 1941, broadcast with Claudette Colbert and Don Ameche as Novak and Kralik, along with Cecil B. DeMille as narrator. Both radio adaptations were included on the December 2020 Warner Archive Blu-ray release of the film, sourced from the brand new 2K digital restoration of the 35mm interpositive.

The Shop Around the Corner is ranked number 28 on AFI's 100 Years... 100 Passions and is listed in Time's All-Time 100 Movies. In 1999, the film was selected for preservation in the United States National Film Registry by the Library of Congress as being "culturally, historically, or aesthetically significant". Sullavan, Stewart, and Morgan were awarded "Best Performances of the Month" in Photoplay magazine. It was also named one of the "Best Pictures of the Month".

=== Remakes ===
The film has spawned numerous remakes, including:

- A musical, In the Good Old Summertime (1949), starring Judy Garland and Van Johnson. The Budapest setting is replaced with Chicago.
- The 1963 Broadway musical She Loves Me by Jerry Bock and Sheldon Harnick.
- Nora Ephron's You've Got Mail (1998). Kathleen Kelly (Meg Ryan) owns a bookstore called "The Shop Around the Corner" and unknowingly falls in love with her business rival Joe Fox (Tom Hanks) through email.
- The TV movie A Sprinkle of Christmas (2024) reworks the classic with a baker and famous actor feuding online before falling in love.
- The 2025 Amazon Prime Video film Maintenance Required, in which rival mechanics fall in love on an online forum.

== Themes ==
The Shop Around the Corner has different social themes than Lubitsch's previous films. According to David Sanjek, The Shop Around the Corner differs from Lubitsch's other films because it focuses on community rather than the individual. Lubitsch was beginning to focus more on the middle class in his films. In 1939 he remarked, “We must show people living in the real world. No one used to care how characters made their living if the picture was amusing. Now they do care. They want their stories tied up to life.” The Shop Around the Corner steps away from "sophisticated comedy", which focuses on people belonging to the upper class. William Paul, professor of Film and Media Studies, claims that because it instead focuses on the middle class, it is "more thoroughly political than any of Lubitsch's historical dramas".

Author Scott Eyman describes it as "a film…about men and women who are happy to be middle class and trying to stay that way". He further argues that the film highlights "the extraordinary qualities" of average middle-class people. Of the characters, Vadas lives beyond his social class, as manifest by his affair with Mrs. Matuschek. Paul explains that the difference between Vadas, Kralik, and Novak, is that Vadas attempts to live his desire for a higher-class life, while Kralik and Novak keep their desires more private. Author Leland Poague sees Vadas as being symbolic of less desirable qualities in the middle class and his being fired as symbolic of the other characters getting rid of those qualities. He also views the film as highlighting the emotions of middle class people. In her analysis of the film, film critic and author Ivana Novak calls Kralik and Klara Novak "two awkward and shallow phonys" because they are two average people pretending to be cultured. They seek to appear cultured in their letters because they are afraid of being perceived as insignificant. Both Kralik and Novak believe their letters are sincere and accurately reflect who they are. Their in-person interactions versus their correspondence reveal a rift between their realities and what they desire. Poague argues that, because Kralik and Novak are not satisfied with their lives, they do not accept that other people are as passionate as themselves. Initially, Kralik hesitates to reveal his identity to Novak because he comes to recognize that his letters do not accurately reflect who he is. Actor and author George Toles suggests that Kralik and Novak are spared from living outside of their realities once they accept that they are ordinary.

William Paul and author Jonathan Coe point out that money concerns play a large role in the plot. Much of the dialogue is about money, and Kralik will only consider marriage if he receives a pay raise. There are also concerns of hierarchy. The characters believe that their positions within the shop will reflect how they are seen by society, which motivates Pepi's drive to become a clerk. Both Novak and Kralik have connected their identities to their positions of power within the shop, believing that it affects how they are seen by others.

== See also ==
- List of Christmas films
