= In the Good Old Summertime =

1949 film by Buster Keaton, Robert Zigler Leonard

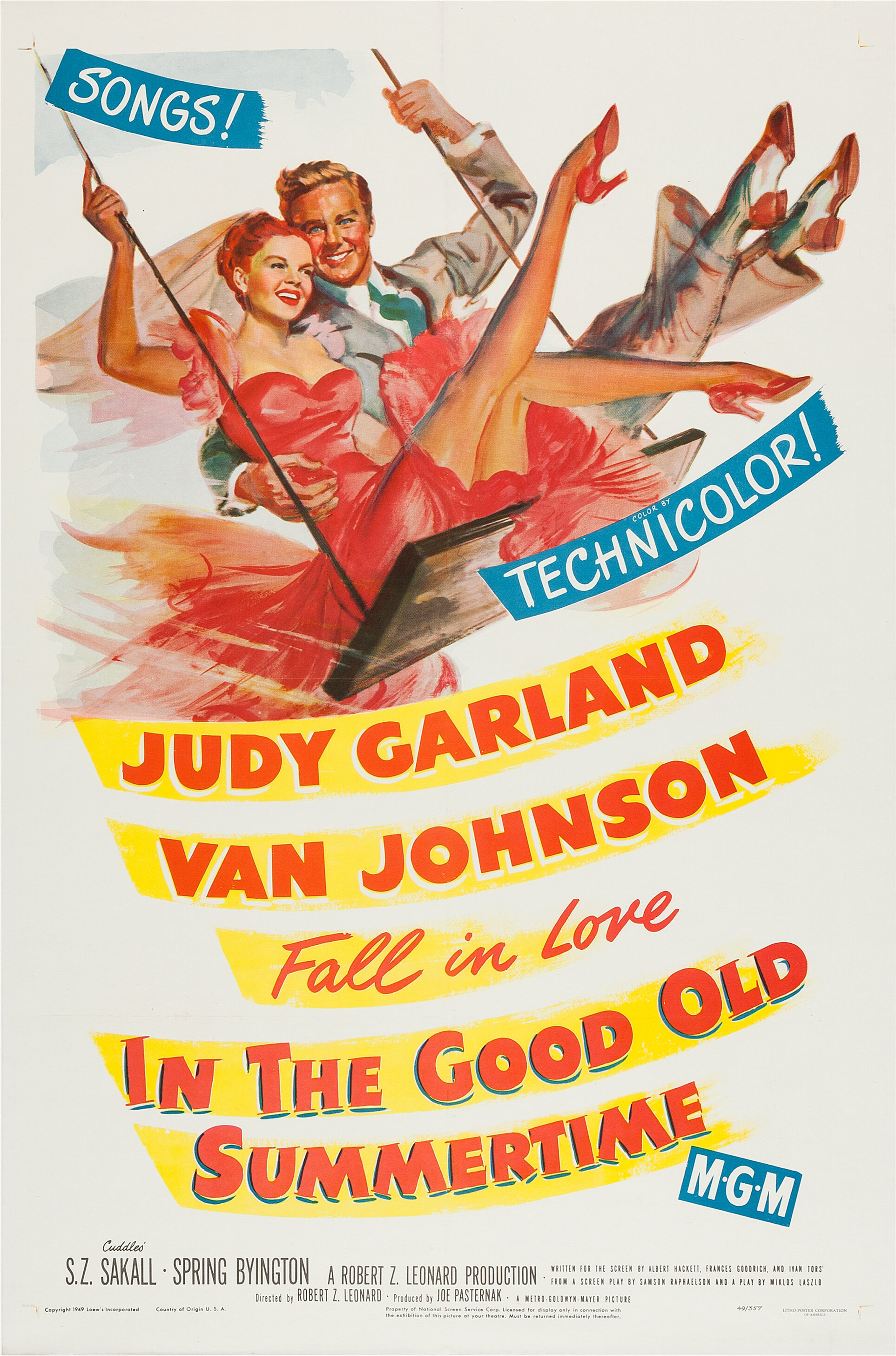
- Theatrical release poster
- Directed by: Robert Z. Leonard; Buster Keaton (uncredited)
- Screenplay by: Albert Hackett; Frances Goodrich; Ivan Tors; Samson Raphaelson; Buster Keaton (uncredited)
- Based on: Parfumerie; 1937 play by Miklós László
- Produced by: Joe Pasternak
- Starring: Judy Garland; Van Johnson; S. Z. "Cuddles" Sakall; Spring Byington
- Cinematography: Harry Stradling
- Edited by: Adrienne Fazan
- Music by: Fred Spielman; George Evans; Betti O'Dell; George E. Stoll; Jimmy Wakely; Robert Van Eps
- Production company: Metro-Goldwyn-Mayer
- Distributed by: Loew's Inc.
- Release date: July 29, 1949
- Running time: 102 minutes
- Country: United States
- Language: English
- Budget: $1,577,000
- Box office: $3,534,000

In the Good Old Summertime is a 1949 American Technicolor musical romantic comedy film directed by Robert Z. Leonard. It stars Judy Garland, Van Johnson, S. Z. Sakall, Spring Byington, Clinton Sundberg, and Buster Keaton in his first featured film role at MGM since 1933.

The film is a musical adaptation of the 1940 film The Shop Around the Corner, which was directed by Ernst Lubitsch, starring James Stewart, Margaret Sullavan, and Frank Morgan, and written by Miklós László, based on his 1937 play Parfumerie. For In the Good Old Summertime, the locale has been changed from 1930s Budapest to turn-of-the-century Chicago, but the plot remains the same. The plot was also revived in the 1963 Broadway musical She Loves Me, and the 1998 film You've Got Mail, starring Tom Hanks and Meg Ryan.

== Plot ==
On a spring day in Chicago, in the early 1900s, Andrew Larkin is the top salesman at Otto Oberkugen's music store. On his way to work, he runs into Veronica Fisher. When Andrew arrives, he rushes to the post office and reads a letter from his secret pen pal, known as "Box Number 237." That same day, Veronica arrives at the store requesting a job there. Mr. Oberkugen initially refuses to hire Veronica, but he hires her after she persuades a customer to buy a harp. Several months pass and the store's sales dwindle, in which Veronica and Andrew's professional relationship turns contentious. Regardless, their pen pal relationship turns romantic.

During the wintertime, Andrew and Veronica, unbeknownst to each other, arrange to have dinner together. However, Oberkugen has the staff to stay overtime to take a store inventory, upsetting both Andrew and Veronica. Their coworker Nellie Burke manages to have Oberkurgen change his mind after she confesses her love towards him. Outside the restaurant, Andrew learns Veronica is his secret pen pal. Disappointed at first, he returns to the restaurant, but does not reveal to Veronica that he is her pen pal. Instead, he intentionally irritates Veronica, and they fall into a heated argument. Andrew leaves, and Veronica returns home thinking her date failed to show. The next day, Veronica calls in sick. Andrew comes to visit Veronica and invites her to Otto and Nellie's engagement party.

Back at work, Oberkugen hands Andrew his prized Stradivarius violin to safeguard for the party. Instead, Andrew loans the violin to his friend Louise to perform at a recital. At the engagement party, Veronica performs two musical numbers, one with a barbershop quartet and a solo number. For the next number, Oberkugen asks for his violin, to which his nephew Hickey clumsily breaks. Oberkugen is distraught at first, but Andrew tells him that his real violin is with Louise. Andrew and Oberkugen arrive at Louise's recital, and Oberkugen fires him for loaning Louise his violin.

On Christmas Eve, when Andrew returns to collect his belongings, his coworkers tell him their goodbyes. Nellie arranges Oberkugen to write a letter of recommendation for Andrew. However, Oberkugen changes his mind, and promotes Andrew as the new store manager giving him a raise. He also allows for Louise to keep his violin. During the store hours, Oberkugen gives Veronica her bonus, although she intends to quit in protest to Andrew's promotion. When the store closes, Andrew reveals to Veronica that he is her secret pen pal. They kiss, and she consents to marry him.

== Cast ==
- Judy Garland as Veronica Fisher
- Van Johnson as Andrew Delby Larkin
- S. Z. "Cuddles" Sakall as Otto Oberkugen
- Spring Byington as Nellie Burke
- Clinton Sundberg as Rudy Hansen
- Buster Keaton as Hickey
- Lillian Bronson as Addie
- Marcia Van Dyke as Louise

== Songs ==
- "In the Good Old Summertime" (George Evans, Ren Shields)
- "Meet Me Tonight in Dreamland" (Leo Friedman, Beth Slater Whitson)
- "Put Your Arms Around Me, Honey" (Albert Von Tilzer, Junie McCree)
- "Play That Barbershop Chord" (Lewis Muir, Willam Tracey)
- "I Don't Care" (Harry Sutton, Jean Lenox)
- "Merry Christmas" (Fred Spielman, Janice Torre)

== Production ==
In the Good Old Summertime is a film remake of Ernst Lubitsch's 1940 comedy The Shop Around the Corner, which starred James Stewart and Margaret Sullavan. In early October 1948, the Los Angeles Times reported that Judy Garland, Peter Lawford, and June Allyson had been mentioned for potential roles. In his autobiography, Joe Pasternak stated when he came on board as producer, Allyson and Van Johnson were set to appear in the film. However, Allyson became unavailable, and MGM executive Benjamin Thau recommended Judy Garland as a replacement. Pasternak had previously produced Garland's 1943 film Presenting Lily Mars.

At the time, Garland had been removed from The Barkleys of Broadway (1949) when she became ill during rehearsals. MGM studio executive Arthur Freed made the decision to suspend her without pay on July 18, 1948. She was replaced in the film by Ginger Rogers. During the interim, Garland made a cameo appearance in Words and Music (1948) and was allowed to make radio appearances during the autumn. Inside Thau's office, Pasternak offered Garland the lead female role, to which she replied: "Why, Joe, I'd love to do the picture with you." Garland's suspension was lifted on October 20, 1948. That same day, the Los Angeles Times reported Garland and Van Johnson had been cast, with Robert Z. Leonard as the director. Leonard had previously directed Garland in Ziegfeld Girl (1941).

Principal photography began on November 22, 1948. Familiar with Garland's personal difficulties on previous MGM productions, Pasternak saw to it the atmosphere while filming was favorably accommodable to Garland. Pasternak even instructed a single rose be anonymously placed inside Garland's dressing room every morning, with a card that read "Happy Day, Judy". In his autobiography, he wrote: "There was never a word uttered in recrimination when she was late, didn't show up, or couldn't go on. Those of us who worked with her knew her magical genius and respected it."

Buster Keaton—who returned to MGM after he was fired from the studio in 1933—was hired by Robert Z. Leonard as a gag-writer to help him devise a way for a violin to get broken that would be both comedic and plausible. Keaton devised an elaborate stunt that would achieve the desired result. However, Leonard realized Keaton was the only actor who could execute it properly, thus he cast Keaton in the film. Keaton also devised the sequence in which Johnson inadvertently wrecks Garland's hat and coached Johnson intensively in how to perform the scene.

Garland's then three-year-old daughter, Liza Minnelli, made her film debut, walking with her mother and Van Johnson in the film's closing shot. Production wrapped five days ahead of schedule on January 27, 1949, which had impressed MGM studio president Louis B. Mayer. He asked Van Johnson: "What did you do to Judy?" Johnson replied, "We made her feel needed. We joked with her and kept her happy."

The song "Last Night When We Were Young" was written in the 1930s by Harold Arlen and E. Y. "Yip" Harburg for the Metropolitan Opera star Lawrence Tibbett. Garland loved it and wanted to include it in the film. It was recorded and filmed but when the picture was released, it was cut from the final print. The audio recording of "Last Night When We Were Young" was featured on several of Garland's MGM record albums and she also later recorded it for Capitol Records in the 1950s. The entire footage of the number was found in the MGM vaults and included in the PBS documentary American Masters: Judy Garland: By Myself in 2004.

== Reception ==
=== Box office ===
According to MGM records, it earned $2,892,000 in the US and Canada and $642,000 overseas, resulting in a profit of $601,000.

=== Critical reaction ===
Thomas M. Pryor of The New York Times called the film "a happy occasion indeed. Everybody associated with its filming must have been touched by the magical, wispy charm of the work because there is an air of gaiety and wholesomeness about In the Good Old Summertime, which defies specific description." Harrison's Reports felt the film was a "pleasurable musical, lavishly produced and photographed in Technicolor. It has good comedy, a pleasing romance, and highly enjoyable song numbers, mixed in a manner that should give the picture wide appeal." Kate Cameron of the New York Daily News felt Robert Z. Leonard "imbued the twice-told screen tale with an old-fashioned charm that makes it very appealing entertainment."

Judy Garland received particular praise for her performance. Variety praised Garland as "the chief luminary", stating she "delivers these tunes with dispatch, simple appeal and nice rhythm." Harrison's Reports wrote "she is in top form and appears to much better advantage than she has in most of her recent pictures. She sings four old-time favorites in a style that is eminently satisfying." The New York Times wrote Garland was "fresh as a daisy and she sings a number of nostalgic songs in winning fashion. In fact, her slightly amusing and free-wheeling interpretation of "I Don't Care" brought a burst of applause, which is not a common tribute in a movie house."

On the review aggregator website Rotten Tomatoes, 62% of 13 critics' reviews are positive.

The film is recognized by American Film Institute in these lists:

- 2006: AFI's Greatest Movie Musicals – Nominated

== See also ==
- List of Christmas films
