= Her First Roman =

- Music: Ervin Drake
- Lyrics: Ervin Drake
- Book: Ervin Drake
- Basis: George Bernard Shaw's Caesar and Cleopatra
- Productions: 1968 Broadway

Her First Roman is a musical with music, lyrics, and book by Ervin Drake, based on the 1898 George Bernard Shaw play Caesar and Cleopatra.

== Original production ==
During its out-of-town tryout, the original director Michael Benthall was fired and succeeded by Derek Goldby, and the original choreographer was fired and replaced. Jerry Bock and Sheldon Harnick were brought in to write new songs and wrote "Ptolemy", "(Kind) Old Gentleman", and "Caesar is Wrong". Goldby cut a lot of Drake's score and replaced whole sections of his libretto with lines from Shaw's play. The show opened at the Lunt-Fontanne Theatre on October 20, 1968 and closed after 17 performances.

The rest of the crew had set design and costume by Michael Annals, lighting design Martin Aronstein, musical director and dance and incidental music Peter Howard, music orchestrated and vocal arrangements Don Walker, production manager Tom Porter, stage managers George Rondo and Ellen Wittman, and press by Max Eisen and Carl Samrock.

The opening night cast was Richard Kiley (Julius Caesar), Leslie Uggams (Cleopatra), Cal Bellini (Apollodorus), Jack Dabdoub (Roman Centurion), Larry Douglas (Achillas), Philip Graves (Ptolemy), Bruce MacKay (Rufio), Claudia McNeil (Ftatateeta), Earl Montgomery (Pothinus), and Brooks Morton (Britannus), The ensemble included Suzanne Rogers, Trina Parks, Kenneth Kamal Scott, and Priscilla Lopez.

== Plot Synopsis ==
Note: Based on 25th Anniversary Recording

=== Act One ===
It is night in the Egyptian desert, somewhere near Alexandria. The invading Roman army sings the song of the unknown soldier (Opening/What Are We Doing In Egypt?). In the darkness, their leader Julius Caesar (Richard Kiley) pays homage to what he mistakenly believes to be the great Sphinx (Song of the Sphinx). In reality, it is a little Sphinx and asleep in its shadows is the adolescent Cleopatra (Leslie Uggams). The young Queen does not recognize the Roman conqueror as she confides in him (Save Me From Caesar). Later at the palace, Cleopatra has romantic fantasies (Many Young Men From Now).

Caesar appears at the council chamber of Cleopatra's little brother Ptolemy. He is threatened by Pothinus, the power behind the throne. Surrounded by hostile forces, Caesar reveals a complex personality (When My Back is To The Wall). Caesar is now a force which must be dealt with. Ftatateeta (Brenda Silas-Moore), Cleopatra's nurse and slave, lectures her on how to make Caesar her hostage (Pleasure Him). Caesar's general, Rufio (Ron Raines), and a Roman soldier boast of their sexual prowess to Iras (Priscilla Lopez) and Cleopatra's handmaiden; Caesar's British slave Britannus (Jack Eddleman) knows better (Her First Roman).

As the Egyptian army against Caesar grows, he retreats to a lighthouse at Alexandria. Cleopatra cunningly plans to join Caesar and wraps herself in a carpet for delivery (Magic Carpet). Meanwhile, in the lighthouse, Caesar expresses his greatest aspirations, which masquerades as a love song to a city (Rome). Rufio confirms Caesar's suspicion that he is romantically over-the-hill (The Dangerous Age). The Greek merchant Apollodorus (Matt Leahy) delivers Cleopatra at Caesar's Feet just as the Egyptian army attacks. To escape, Cleopatra must swim (The Things We Think We Are). One by one they jump off the parapet into the sea, with Cleopatra helped by Rufio's boot.

=== Act Two ===
Back at the Palace, Britannus learns things about Caesar and Cleopatra that shock his sensibilities (Her First Roman: Reprise). Iras and the handmaidens gossip about the supposed affair between the 16 year old Cleopatra and the balding, fifty-ish Caesar as the queen overhears (Parable Of the Monkey). Cleopatra confesses to her enemy Pothinus that she has not succeeded in capturing Caesar's heart. Caesar reflects that he is much more involved with the young Queen than she imagines (I Cannot Make Him Jealous/I Can't Help Feeling Jealous). Cleopatra reflects on the fascination of a worldly, older man for a younger girl (The Wrong Man). Suspecting danger to her royal ward, Ftatateeta begs Cleopatra to allow her to guide the queen (Let Me Lead The Way). Insulted by Pothinus, headstrong Cleopatra demands that Ftatateeta prove her loyalty by killing him.

At a rooftop party given in Caesar's honor, he and his companions sing a lighthearted but philosophical drinking song (In Vino Veritas). Rufio leads the company in a rowdy soldier's song, well remembered by Caesar and Britannus, who is now quite drunk on Falnerian wine (Evil Companions). As they hear Pothinus' death cries, the Egyptians riot. Rufio discover Ftatateeta is the assassin and in retaliation he kills her. Troubled and regretful, Cleopatra wishes for simpler times. She finds her nurse's body and realizes that she is responsible for her death. Bravely she accepts her role as Queen (Just For Today). The Roman army departs, Caesar bids Rufio to remain and watch over Cleopatra is reunited with Caesar and they are on their way to Rome (Finale Ultimo).
