= The Body Beautiful =

Musical with a book by Joseph Stein and Will Glickman

- Original Cast Recording
- Music: Jerry Bock
- Lyrics: Sheldon Harnick
- Book: Joseph Stein; Will Glickman
- Productions: 1958 Broadway

The Body Beautiful is a musical with a book by Joseph Stein and Will Glickman, lyrics by Sheldon Harnick, and music by Jerry Bock.

The first collaboration by Harnick and Bock, and the only one to have a contemporary setting, its plot focuses on a wealthy Dartmouth College graduate who aspires to be a prize-winning boxer and the girl he loves who disapproves of his ambitions. His fight manager must cope with uninspired fighters, two ex-wives and a new girlfriend.

After a tryout at the Erlanger Theatre in Philadelphia, Pennsylvania, the Broadway production, directed by George Schaefer and choreographed by Herbert Ross, opened on January 23, 1958, at The Broadway Theatre, where it ran for 60 performances. The cast included Mindy Carson, Steve Forrest, Jack Warden, Barbara McNair, William Hickey, Brock Peters, and Alan Weeks.

Journalist Dorothy Kilgallen and her husband Richard Kollmar co-produced the short-run musical, along with Albert W. Selden. Kilgallen, very visible due to her appearances as a panelist on network TV's What's My Line?, and her fellow panelists made mention of The Body Beautiful on various episodes of the game show during this time period.

In fact, during one live telecast of the Sunday-night staple on CBS, a well-built man named Ed Becker, one of the cast members of the ill-fated musical, appeared as a contestant with his line identified as "chorus boy." Becker stumped Kilgallen and the rest of the panel much to the delight of host John Charles Daly.

Despite the failure of The Body Beautiful, its score captured the attention of theatrical director George Abbott and producer Hal Prince. They hired the songwriting team of Harnick and Bock for their next project, the politically themed Fiorello!, which proved to be a hit.

== Song list ==
Act I

- Where Are They?
- The Body Beautiful
- Pffft!
- Fair Warning
- Leave Well Enough Alone
- Blonde Blues
- Blonde Blues Dance
- Uh-Huh, Oh Yeah!
- All of These and More
- Nobility
- The Body Beautiful (Reprise)

Act II

- Summer Is
- The Honeymoon is Over
- Just My Luck
- All of These and More (Reprise)
- Art of Conversation
- Gloria
- A Relatively Simple Affair
- Finale
