= The Madwoman of Central Park West =

- an original musical comedy
- Original cast recording
- Music: Peter Allen; Leonard Bernstein; Jerry Bock; Martin Charnin; John Clifton; Betty Comden; Fred Ebb; Jack Feldman; Adolph Green; Sheldon Harnick; John Kander; Ed Kleban; Barry Manilow; Phyllis Newman; Joe Raposo; Mary Rodgers; Carole Bayer Sager; Stephen Sondheim; Bruce Sussman
- Book: Arthur Laurents; Phyllis Newman
- Productions: 1979 Broadway

The Madwoman of Central Park West is a semi-autobiographical one-woman musical with a book by Arthur Laurents and Phyllis Newman and songs by various composers and lyricists. It focuses on the difficulties faced by an older actress who tries to balance her career with her life as a wife and mother.

Among those whose songs are included in the production are Peter Allen, Leonard Bernstein, Jerry Bock, Martin Charnin, Betty Comden, Fred Ebb, Adolph Green, Sheldon Harnick, John Kander, Ed Kleban, Barry Manilow, Joe Raposo, Mary Rodgers, Carole Bayer Sager, and Stephen Sondheim.

== Productions ==
Under the title My Mother Was a Fortune-Teller and starring Newman as basically herself, it originally was directed by Laurents at the Hudson Guild Theatre. Slightly revised and with a new title, it transferred to 22 Steps where, after 15 previews, it opened on June 13, 1979, and closed on August 25 after 85 performances.

The production had scenery by Phillip Jung, costumes by Theoni V. Aldredge, lighting by Ken Billington, sound by Abe Jacob and musical direction by Herbert Kaplan.

== Musical numbers ==
- Up! Up! Up!
- My Mother Was a Fortune Teller
- Cheerleader
- What Makes Me Love HIm?
- Don't Laugh
- Women's Medley
- Up! Up! Up! - Reprise
- Better
- Copacabana
- My New Friends
- A Song of Lists

== Critical reviews ==
In his review for New York, John Simon described it as "above all else, embarrassing" and called the writing "uniformly feeble." He thought the interpolated songs were "not great stuff" and added, "[T]hough Miss Newman is a talented musical comedienne, she cannot make them into more than they are." He did praise "a medley of old songs glorifying woman as sex object or domestic drudge - which she renders with delightful satiric brio."

Richard Eder, reviewing for The New York Times wrote: "Miss Newman's performance is mostly good and sometimes quite winning, though it lacks any very specific flavor. The problem is with the personage she plays: a neurotic, well‐to‐do New Yorker torn between coping with her husband and two children, and resuming her show‐business career... The best part of the evening comes when Miss Newman cuts away from her tepid personage and goes into a marvelous medley of show songs, all of which portray women in various condescending fashions..."

== Recording ==
Twelve of the musical numbers were recorded and released by DRG Records.
