= She Loves Me =

Musical with a book by Joe Masteroff, lyrics by Sheldon Harnick, and music by Jerry Bock

- Original Broadway windowcard
- Music: Jerry Bock
- Lyrics: Sheldon Harnick
- Book: Joe Masteroff
- Basis: Parfumerie by Miklós László
- Productions: 1963 Broadway; 1964 West End; 1993 Broadway revival 1994 West End revival 2016 Broadway revival 2016 West End revival
- Awards: 1993 Drama Desk Award for Outstanding Revival of a Musical; 1994 Laurence Olivier Award for Best Musical Revival; 2016 Drama Desk Award for Outstanding Revival of a Musical

She Loves Me is a musical with a book by Joe Masteroff, music by Jerry Bock, and lyrics by Sheldon Harnick. The plot revolves around Budapest shop employees Georg and Amalia, who, despite being consistently at odds with each other at work, are unaware that each is the other's secret pen pal met through lonely-hearts ads. It was the third adaptation of the 1937 play Parfumerie by Hungarian playwright Miklós László, following the 1940 film The Shop Around the Corner and the 1949 musical version In the Good Old Summertime. It was followed by the 1998 movie You've Got Mail.

The musical premiered on Broadway in 1963 and ran for 301 performances, was produced in the West End in 1964, and received award-winning revivals on each side of the Atlantic in the 1990s as well as numerous regional productions. Although the original Broadway run was not a financial success, She Loves Me slowly became a cult classic, and the very successful 2016 Broadway revival became the first Broadway show ever to be live-streamed.

== Synopsis ==
=== Act One ===
On a beautiful summer day in Budapest in 1934, the employees of Maraczek's Parfumerie arrive at work ("Good Morning, Good Day"). Working at the shop are Ladislav Sipos, a fretful middle-aged salesman with a family; teenage delivery boy Arpad Laszlo; thirty-something Ilona Ritter, who is having an affair with suave Steven Kodaly; and Georg Nowack, the shy assistant manager. Mr. Maraczek arrives to open the store, and soon business is under way ("Sounds While Selling"/"Thank You, Madam"). Georg has been exchanging letters with an anonymous woman he knows only as "Dear Friend", and he shares today's romantic letter with Sipos. Maraczek advises Georg to get married and recalls being a bachelor ("Days Gone By").

Arpad begins stocking the shelves with a new musical cigarette case. Mr. Maraczek bets Georg that they will manage to sell one within an hour. A nervous young woman, Amalia Balash, enters, hoping to obtain a job at the Parfumerie. When Georg tells her they are not hiring, she demands to speak with Maraczek. Amalia takes one of the cigarette cases and convinces a customer that it is really a musical candy box that plays each time it is opened to gently tell the owner "no more candy" ("No More Candy"). Maraczek is impressed and immediately hires Amalia.

As summer turns into autumn and then into the early days of winter, tension grows in the shop. Ilona and Kodaly are at odds, Mr. Maraczek is increasingly short-tempered with Georg, and Georg and Amalia bicker constantly. Georg finds solace in his anonymous romantic pen pal, not suspecting that his correspondent is none other than Amalia ("Three Letters"). Their fellow employees observe their bickering, and Sipos explains to Arpad that they argue because they unknowingly like each other very much. Arpad naively suggests they tell Georg and Amalia this, and Sipos retorts that they'd never believe it. Finally, in early December, the two "Dear Friends" arrange to meet in person.

Maraczek humiliatingly dresses down Georg for a minor problem. Georg tells Sipos that tonight he will finally meet his "dear friend" ("Tonight At Eight"). Meanwhile, Amalia explains to Ilona that even though she has not met her "dear friend" yet, she knows him very well from his letters ("I Don't Know His Name").

Mr. Maraczek and Georg argue, and when it becomes obvious that Maraczek is about to fire Georg, Sipos knocks over the stack of musical cigarette boxes to distract him. Maraczek reprimands Sipos and leaves. Sipos tells Georg that no replacement would treat him as well as Georg does ("Perspective"). Maraczek insists that everyone stay late to decorate for Christmas, but Amalia says she must leave early for her date. Georg asks to leave too, but Mr. Maraczek refuses to let him go. Georg angrily quits, and the other employees sadly say goodbye to Georg ("Goodbye Georg"). Amalia leaves clutching a copy of Anna Karenina with a rose in it so that her "dear friend" will be able to identify her. She wonders if "dear friend" will like her ("Will He Like Me?") Meanwhile, inside the shop, Kodaly begins seducing Ilona ("Ilona"). They make a date, but when Mr. Maraczek insists they must close the store early, Kodaly realizes that he has time for a 9:30 date that he previously scheduled. He postpones his date with Ilona, and she angrily declares that she will never fall for a man like him again ("I Resolve"). Georg is nervous and asks Sipos to give "dear friend" a note explaining that Georg could not come.

Mr. Maraczek's private investigator enters the shop and tells him that Kodaly is having an affair with his wife. Maraczek had assumed it was Georg. The investigator leaves, and Maraczek's wife calls to say she'll be out late. Maraczek points a gun at his own head and pulls the trigger as Arpad enters the shop. Meanwhile, in the Cafe Imperiale, the head waiter is trying to maintain a romantic atmosphere as Amalia waits with her book and rose ("Romantic Atmosphere"). Georg and Sipos enter and are shocked to realize that Amalia is Georg's date; however, Amalia does not know Georg is her "dear friend". Georg sits at Amalia's table and mocks her, singing a "Tango Tragique" about a woman who was murdered on a blind date (this song has been cut in later productions). They argue, and Georg leaves. As the cafe closes, Amalia, still waiting, begs "dear friend" not to abandon her ("Dear Friend").

=== Act Two ===
The next day, Mr. Maraczek has survived his suicide attempt, and Arpad comes to visit him in the hospital. Maraczek is impressed with Arpad's hard work in his absence, and Arpad begs to be promoted to sales clerk ("Try Me"). Georg also stops by, and Maraczek apologizes and asks him to return to his job. Maraczek tells Georg to fire Kodaly and mentions that Amalia has called in sick.

Georg is worried about Amalia and visits her at her apartment. She fears he has come to spy on her and tell the others she is not really sick, so she attempts to get out of bed and get ready for work ("Where's My Shoe"). Georg, seeing she is truly sick, forces her back to bed and presents her with a gift: vanilla ice cream. He apologizes for his rudeness the previous night, but Amalia tells him that he was right about her date; if "dear friend" really loved her, he would have come. Georg, meaning well, makes up a story that he saw an older, bald, fat gentleman looking into the cafe. Georg says the man told him that he had to work and could not meet his date, and Georg surmises that he must be her "dear friend". Amalia is surprised to find she enjoys her conversation with Georg. After he leaves, she begins a letter to "dear friend" but can only think of Georg's kindness and his gift ("Vanilla Ice Cream").

Georg joyously realizes that Amalia loves him ("She Loves Me"). At Maraczek's, Ilona explains to Sipos that she has gotten over Kodaly; last night, she went to the library where she met Paul, a kindly optometrist ("A Trip to the Library"). Kodaly bids everyone goodbye ("Grand Knowing You"). With Christmas fast approaching, the employees are busy helping last-minute shoppers, and Georg and Amalia enjoy each other's company ("Twelve Days to Christmas"). On Christmas Eve, Amalia tells Georg she has invited "dear friend" to spend the evening with her and her mother. She invites Georg as well, and he hesitatingly accepts. Mr. Maraczek returns to the shop for a happy reunion, and Ilona announces her plans to accept Paul's proposal that night, even though he does not know he is going to propose yet. Sipos leaves to join his family's Christmas party, and Maraczek takes Arpad for a night on the town.

Georg helps Amalia with her packages as she leaves the shop, and they accidentally drop one of the musical cigarette boxes. Amalia intends to give it to "dear friend", but Georg says he really would like it; it will remind him of the day he first met her. He admits that he always thought Amalia was the sort of girl he could fall in love with. Amalia confesses to having similar feelings, and Georg takes one of Amalia's letters to "dear friend" out of his pocket and begins reading it aloud. Amalia finally understands that Georg really is "dear friend" and they kiss ("Finale").

== Musical numbers ==
Act I

- "Prelude" / "Good Morning, Good Day" – Georg, Arpad, Sipos, Ilona and Kodaly
- "Sounds While Selling" – Customers, Sipos, Kodaly and Georg
- "Thank You, Madam" – Clerks
- "Days Gone By" – Maraczek
- "No More Candy" – Amalia
- "Three Letters" – Amalia, Georg
- "Tonight at Eight" – Georg
- "I Don't Know His Name" – Amalia and Ilona
- "Perspective" – Sipos
- "Goodbye Georg" – Customers and Clerks
- "Will He Like Me?" – Amalia
- "Ilona" – Kodaly, Arpad, and Sipos
- "I Resolve" – Ilona
- "A Romantic Atmosphere" – Maitre D'
- "Tango Tragique" – Georg
- "Mr. Nowack, Will You Please?" – Amalia and Waiter
- "Dear Friend" – Amalia

Act II

- "Entr'acte" – Orchestra
- "Try Me" – Arpad
- "Days Gone By" (Reprise) – Maraczek
- "Where's My Shoe?" – Amalia and Georg
- "Vanilla Ice Cream" – Amalia
- "She Loves Me" – Georg
- "A Trip to the Library" – Ilona
- "Grand Knowing You" – Kodaly
- "Twelve Days to Christmas" – Carolers, Customers and Clerks
- "Finale" – Georg and Amalia

=== Changes ===
- "Heads I Win" replaced "I Resolve" in 1964 London Production.
- "Three Letters" revised as "Letters" in 1964 London Production for George, Amalia and Ensemble.
- "Twelve Days To Christmas" revised for 1993 Broadway Revival, used in subsequent productions.
- "Tango Tragique" spoken over underscoring in 1993 and 2016 Broadway Revivals.

=== Cut and unused songs ===
- "Tell Me I Look Nice" (cut prior to opening) - Amalia
- "Merry Christmas Bells" (replaced by "Ilona", used as counter-melody with some lyrics) - Sipos, Arpad, Kodaly and Miss Ritter
- "My North American Drugstore" (replaced by "Grand Knowing You") - Kodaly
- "Christmas Eve" (cut prior to opening) - Mr. Maraczek and Employees

== Productions ==
Producer Lawrence Kasha brought the three writers together.

=== Broadway debut ===
The musical premiered on Broadway on April 23, 1963, at the Eugene O'Neill Theatre not long after the settlement of the four-month-long 1962–1963 New York City newspaper strike. Nevertheless, the show managed to run for 302 performances. The musical was directed by Harold Prince and choreographed by Carol Haney, with the cast that featured Daniel Massey as Georg Nowack, Barbara Cook as Amalia Balash, Barbara Baxley as Ilona Ritter, Jack Cassidy as Stephen Kodaly, Nathaniel Frey as Ladislav Sipos, Ralph Williams as Arpad Laszlo, and Ludwig Donath as Mr. Maraczek. The romantic, old fashioned show was short on big song and dance numbers, and the Eugene O'Neill Theatre was too small to generate a big profit. A two-record original cast recording was released by MGM Records and re-released on CD on the Polydor label in 1987.

=== 1964 West End ===
The West End production opened on April 29, 1964, at the Lyric Theatre, where it ran for 189 performances. The cast included Gary Raymond, Rita Moreno, Anne Rogers and Gary Miller. A London cast recording was released by Angel Records.

=== Faded From View ===
After the original Broadway production it was 30 years before a major revival. Critic Arthur Dorman, in a review of a production in 2019, says that it was overshadowed by the big Broadway productions of that time. "But," he says, "a small group of fans kept a flame going for She Loves Me, which was further flamed when the original Amalia, Barbara Cook, became a staple of cabarets and concert stages and made 'Vanilla Ice Cream' one of her signature performance pieces." Cook began her concert career on January 26, 1975 at Carnegie Hall; the concert included three songs ("Dear Friend," "Will He Like Me?" and "Vanilla Ice Cream") from She Loves Me.

=== 1993 Broadway revival ===
The Roundabout Theatre Company produced a Broadway revival, directed by Scott Ellis and choreographed by Rob Marshall (assisted by his sister Kathleen). It opened on June 10, 1993, at the Criterion Center Stage Right and transferred on September 28, 1993, to the Brooks Atkinson Theatre, closing on June 19, 1994, after a total of 354 performances and 42 previews. The cast included Boyd Gaines as Georg, Judy Kuhn (replaced by Diane Fratantoni when the show transferred) as Amalia, Sally Mayes as Ilona, Howard McGillin as Kodaly, Lee Wilkof as Ladislav, Brad Kane as Arpad, and Louis Zorich as Mr. Maraczek. A revival cast recording was released by Varèse Sarabande, featuring Fratantoni as Amalia. The production was conducted by David Loud.

The West End revival, also directed by Ellis and choreographed by Marshall, opened on July 12, 1994, at the Savoy Theatre, where it ran for one year. The cast included John Gordon Sinclair as Georg, Ruthie Henshall as Amalia, and Tracie Bennett as Ilona. A revival cast recording was released on the First Night label.

=== 2016 Broadway revival ===
The Roundabout Theatre Company presented a revival in 2016, again directed by Scott Ellis and choreographed by Warren Carlyle, on Broadway which opened at Studio 54 on March 17 following previews from February 19 in a limited engagement to June 5. The production starred Laura Benanti as Amalia, Zachary Levi as Georg, Jane Krakowski as Ilona, Gavin Creel as Kodaly, Byron Jennings as Maraczek, and Michael McGrath as Sipos. On December 2, 2015, it was announced that Byron Jennings would play the role of Maraczek, replacing René Auberjonois. The revival's run was extended to July 10, 2016, and Tom McGowan replaced Michael McGrath in the role of Sipos beginning May 10, 2016.

Following the success of the 2016 Broadway revival, the musical was revived in London's West End at the Menier Chocolate Factory, with the first preview on November 25, 2016, and opening officially on December 7, for a limited run through March 5, 2017. Directed by Matthew White, the cast starred Scarlett Strallen as Amalia Balash.

==== 2016 live broadcast ====
The June 30, 2016, performance of the Roundabout revival of She Loves Me was presented via BroadwayHD live stream, marking the first time a Broadway show had ever been broadcast live. The historic broadcast was screened in cinemas on December 1, 2016.

=== Other productions ===
A limited run of concert performances was held in March 1977 at The Town Hall in New York City, and featured Madeline Kahn as Amalia, Barry Bostwick as Georg, Rita Moreno as Ilona, George Rose as Mr. Maraczek, and Laurence Guittard as Kodaly.

A slightly abridged BBC-TV production was made in 1978 starring Gemma Craven as Amalia, Robin Ellis as Georg, and David Kernan as Kodaly.

Conductor Tom Helm served as music director for productions of She Loves Me staged at the Pittsburgh Civic Light Opera (PCLO) in 2003 and the Paper Mill Playhouse (PMP) in 2004. The PCLO production was directed by Van Kaplan and starred Jacquelyn Piro as Amalia, George Dvorsky as Georg, and David Hess as Kodaly. The PMP production also starred Dvorsky and Hess but with Michele Ragusa as Amalia and James Brennan as director.

The Oregon Shakespeare Festival in Ashland, Oregon, staged a production as part of its 2010 season, running from February through October in the Angus Bowmer Theater.

A critically acclaimed, small-scale Australian production opened at Sydney's Hayes Theatre Company, which began previews on 22 August 2018. The show featured Rowan Witt as Georg opposite Caitlin Berry as Amalia, with Tony Llewellyn-Jones as Maraczek. The production was directed by Erin James.

== Characters and original cast ==
Character	Original Broadway cast (1963)	Original London cast (1964)	1977 concert	1993 Broadway revival	1994 London revival	2011 concert	2016 Broadway revival	2016 London revival	2018 Sydney
Amalia Balash	Barbara Cook	Anne Rogers	Madeline Kahn	Judy Kuhn	Ruthie Henshall	Kelli O'Hara	Laura Benanti	Scarlett Strallen	Caitlin Berry
Georg Nowack	Daniel Massey	Gary Raymond	Barry Bostwick	Boyd Gaines	John Gordon Sinclair	Josh Radnor	Zachary Levi	Mark Umbers	Rowan Witt
Ilona Ritter	Barbara Baxley	Rita Moreno	Rita Moreno	Sally Mayes	Tracie Bennett	Jane Krakowski	Jane Krakowski	Katherine Kingsley	Zoe Gertz
Steven Kodaly	Jack Cassidy	Gary Miller	Laurence Guittard	Howard McGillin	Gerard Casey	Gavin Creel	Gavin Creel	Dominic Tighe	Kurt Phelan
Zoltan Maraczek	Ludwig Donath	Karel Štěpánek	George Rose	Louis Zorich	David de Keyser	Victor Garber	Byron Jennings	Les Dennis	Tony Llewellyn-Jones
Ladislav Sipos	Nathaniel Frey	Peter Sallis	Tom Batten	Lee Wilkof	Barry James	Michael McGrath	Michael McGrath	Alastair Brookshaw	Jay James-Moody
Arpad Laszlo	Ralph Williams	Gregory Phillips	George Connolly	Brad Kane	Simon Connolly	Rory O'Malley	Nicholas Barasch	Callum Howells	Joel Granger
Headwaiter	Wood Romoff	Carl Jaffe		Jonathan Freeman	David Alder	Peter Bartlett	Peter Bartlett	Cory English	Jay James-Moody

== Recordings ==
- She Loves Me, the 1963 original Broadway cast album

== Cancelled film adaptation ==
MGM bought the screen rights for the musical in 1967 with plans to make it into a film starring Julie Andrews and to be directed by Harold Prince. After a year of delays, MGM moved forward with the film with a revised production in 1969. Julie Andrews was still set to play Amalia; however Blake Edwards was now set to direct. Dick Van Dyke was strongly considered for the role of Georg which would have reunited Andrews and Van Dyke for the first time since Mary Poppins in 1964. Maurice Chevalier was among those considered for the role of Maraczek. Production was well underway when Kirk Kerkorian bought MGM and installed James T. Aubrey Jr. to run the studio to make sweeping changes.

With a major company restructuring and focus shifting to more youth oriented films, the musical was among the many projects abruptly dropped.

== Awards and nominations ==
=== Original Broadway production ===
Year	Award	Category	Nominee	Result
1964	Tony Award	Best Musical		Nominated
1964	Tony Award	Best Author	Joe Masteroff	Nominated
1964	Tony Award	Best Performance by a Featured Actor in a Musical	Jack Cassidy	Won
1964	Tony Award	Best Direction of a Musical	Harold Prince	Nominated
1964	Tony Award	Best Producer of a Musical	Harold Prince	Nominated

=== 1993 Broadway revival ===
Year	Award	Category	Nominee	Result
1994	Tony Award	Best Revival of a Musical		Nominated
1994	Tony Award	Best Actor in a Musical	Boyd Gaines	Won
1994	Tony Award	Best Actress in a Musical	Judy Kuhn	Nominated
1994	Tony Award	Best Featured Actor in a Musical	Jonathan Freeman	Nominated
1994	Tony Award	Best Featured Actress in a Musical	Sally Mayes	Nominated
1994	Tony Award	Best Direction of a Musical	Scott Ellis	Nominated
1994	Tony Award	Best Choreography	Rob Marshall	Nominated
1994	Tony Award	Best Scenic Design	Tony Walton	Nominated
1994	Tony Award	Best Costume Design	David Charles and Jane Greenwood	Nominated
1994	Drama Desk Award	Outstanding Revival		Won
1994	Drama Desk Award	Outstanding Actor in a Musical	Boyd Gaines	Won
1994	Drama Desk Award	Outstanding Featured Actress in a Musical	Sally Mayes	Nominated
1994	Drama Desk Award	Outstanding Director of a Musical	Scott Ellis	Nominated
1994	Drama Desk Award	Outstanding Choreography	Rob Marshall	Nominated

=== 1994 London revival ===
Year	Award	Category	Nominee	Result
1995	Laurence Olivier Award	Best Musical Revival		Won
1995	Laurence Olivier Award	Best Actor in a Musical	John Gordon Sinclair	Won
1995	Laurence Olivier Award	Best Actress in a Musical	Ruthie Henshall	Won
1995	Laurence Olivier Award	Best Performance in a Supporting Role in a Musical	Tracie Bennett	Won
1995	Laurence Olivier Award	Best Director of a Musical	Scott Ellis	Won
1995	Laurence Olivier Award	Best Theatre Choreographer	Rob Marshall	Nominated
1995	Laurence Olivier Award	Best Costume Design	David Charles and Jane Greenwood	Nominated
1995	Critics Circle Award	Best Musical		Won

=== 2016 Broadway revival ===
Year	Award	Category	Nominee	Result
2016	Tony Awards	Best Revival of a Musical		Nominated
2016	Tony Awards	Best Actor in a Musical	Zachary Levi	Nominated
2016	Tony Awards	Best Actress in a Musical	Laura Benanti	Nominated
2016	Tony Awards	Best Featured Actress in a Musical	Jane Krakowski	Nominated
2016	Tony Awards	Best Direction of a Musical	Scott Ellis	Nominated
2016	Tony Awards	Best Scenic Design of a Musical	David Rockwell	Won
2016	Tony Awards	Best Costume Design of a Musical	Jeff Mahshie	Nominated
2016	Tony Awards	Best Orchestrations	Larry Hochman	Nominated
2016	Drama Desk Awards	Outstanding Revival of a Musical		Won
2016	Drama Desk Awards	Outstanding Actor in a Musical	Zachary Levi	Nominated
2016	Drama Desk Awards	Outstanding Actress in a Musical	Laura Benanti	Nominated
2016	Drama Desk Awards	Outstanding Featured Actor in a Musical	Nicholas Barasch	Nominated
2016	Drama Desk Awards	Outstanding Featured Actress in a Musical	Jane Krakowski	Won
2016	Drama Desk Awards	Outstanding Orchestrations	Larry Hochman	Won
2016	Drama Desk Awards	Outstanding Scenic Design of a Musical	David Rockwell	Won
2016	Drama Desk Awards	Outstanding Costume Design of a Musical	Jeff Mahshie	Nominated
2016	Drama Desk Awards	Outstanding Wig and Hair Design	David Brian Brown	Nominated
2016	Outer Critics Circle Awards	Outstanding Revival of a Musical (Broadway or Off-Broadway)		Won
2016	Outer Critics Circle Awards	Outstanding Actress in a Musical	Laura Benanti	Nominated
2016	Outer Critics Circle Awards	Outstanding Featured Actor in a Musical	Nicholas Barasch	Nominated
2016	Outer Critics Circle Awards	Outstanding Featured Actress in a Musical	Jane Krakowski	Won
2016	Outer Critics Circle Awards	Outstanding Director of a Musical	Scott Ellis	Nominated
2016	Outer Critics Circle Awards	Outstanding Set Design (Play or Musical)	David Rockwell	Won
2016	Outer Critics Circle Awards	Outstanding Costume Design (Play or Musical)	Jeff Mahshie	Won
2016	Outer Critics Circle Awards	Outstanding Lighting Design (Play or Musical)	Donald Holder	Nominated
2016	Drama League Awards	Outstanding Revival of a Broadway or Off-Broadway Musical		Nominated
2016	Drama League Awards	Distinguished Performance	Zachary Levi	Nominated
2016	Drama League Awards	Distinguished Performance	Laura Benanti	Nominated
2016	Astaire Award	Outstanding Female Dancer in a Broadway Show	Jane Krakowski	Won
2016	Astaire Award	Outstanding Ensemble in a Broadway Show	Cameron Adams, Justin Bowen, Alison Cimmet, Benjamin Eakeley, Michael Fatica, Gina Ferrall, Jennifer Goote, Andrew Kober, Laura Shoop, Jim Walton	Nominated
2016	Astaire Award	Outstanding Choreographer in a Broadway Show	Warren Carlyle	Nominated
