= Joe Masteroff =

American playwright (1919–2018)

Joe Masteroff (December 11, 1919 – September 28, 2018) was an American playwright.

== Early life ==
Masteroff was born in Philadelphia, Pennsylvania to Jewish parents Louis Masteroff from Korsun, now Ukraine and to Rose Pogost from Kishinev, now Moldova. He graduated from Temple University before enlisting during World War II.

== Career ==
Masteroff served with the United States Army Air Forces during World War II.

He studied with the American Theatre Wing from 1949 to 1951 and began his career as an actor, making his Broadway debut in The Prescott Proposals in 1953.

Following a national tour, Masteroff's first play, The Warm Peninsula, opened on Broadway at the Hayes Theater in January 1959 with Julie Harris, June Havoc, Farley Granger, and Larry Hagman in the lead roles.

In 1963, he wrote the book for the Sheldon Harnick-Jerry Bock musical She Loves Me, which garnered him a Tony Award nomination for Best Author of a Musical. The musical, directed by Hal Prince, ran on Broadway for 301 performances.

Three years later, when Hal Prince gained control of the rights to John Van Druten's play I Am a Camera and The Berlin Stories by Christopher Isherwood, he discarded the book for a musical adaptation already written by Sandy Wilson and hired Masteroff to fashion his own. With lyrics and music by Kander and Ebb, Cabaret opened on Broadway in November 1966 and ran for 1,165 regular performances, winning the Tony Award for Best Musical.

Masteroff's next and final Broadway project, 70, Girls, 70 was less successful, closing one month after it opened in April 1971. The music and lyrics were by Kander and Ebb.

Masteroff wrote the libretto for an operatic adaptation of Eugene O'Neill's Desire Under the Elms. He wrote the book and lyrics for the musicals Six Wives (Off-Broadway, 1992) and Paramour, the latter based on Jean Anouilh's The Waltz of the Toreadors (Old Globe Theater, San Diego, 1998).
