= Nicholas Barasch =

Actor and performer

Nicholas Barasch is an actor and performer best known for his award-nominated performance in She Loves Me and for playing Orpheus in the North American tour of Hadestown. He is also known for providing the singing voice of Austin in Season 4 of The Backyardigans.

== Early life ==
Barasch is from South Salem, NY.

== Career ==
In 2009, at age 10, Barasch made his Broadway debut in West Side Story playing Kiddo. His performance of "Somewhere" is featured on the cast album.

Barasch originated the roles of Deputy/Master Nick Cricker in The Mystery of Edwin Drood in 2012, performing opposite Stephanie J. Block and Chita Rivera.

In 2016, Barasch earned Drama Desk and Outer Critics Circle Award nominations for his portrayal of Arpad Laszlo in She Loves Me. He is featured in the proshot of the musical featured on PBS' Great Performances. The production started previews on February 19, 2016, and officially opened on March 17, 2016.

In August 2021, Barasch was cast as Orpheus in the North American tour of Hadestown. He left the tour in June 2022.

Barasch starred in the world premiere of The Butcher Boy in 2022.

From April 2025 to July 2025, he starred as Frederic in the Broadway revival of Pirates! The Penzance Musical.

Barasch's television work includes appearances on CBS’ Bull and HBO's How To Make It In America, as well as a recurring role on the CW series Riverdale as Julian Blossom. He was also a series regular on Nickelodeon's The Backyardigans.

== Personal life ==
Barasch is gay.
