= The Apple Tree =

1966 musical

- Music: Jerry Bock
- Lyrics: Sheldon Harnick
- Book: Jerry Bock; Sheldon Harnick; Jerome Coopersmith
- Basis: Mark Twain's; The Diaries of Adam and Eve; Frank R. Stockton's "The Lady, or the Tiger?"; Jules Feiffer's Passionella
- Productions: 1966 Broadway; 2005 Encores! 2006 Broadway revival

The Apple Tree is a series of three musical playlets with music by Jerry Bock, lyrics by Sheldon Harnick, and a book by Bock and Harnick with contributions from Jerome Coopersmith. Each act has its own storyline, but all three are tied together by a common theme (be careful what you wish for) and common references, such as references to the color brown. The first act is based on Mark Twain's The Diaries of Adam and Eve; the second act is based on Frank R. Stockton's "The Lady, or the Tiger?"; the third act is based on Jules Feiffer's Passionella. The working title for the evening of three musicals was Come Back! Go Away! I Love You!

== Production history ==
Director Mike Nichols and producer Stuart Ostrow initially considered Dustin Hoffman for the musical, based on a recommendation from casting director Michael Shurtleff. Hoffman was rejected because his singing ability did not fulfill the vocal requirements for the role, which went to Alan Alda. However, Nichols was so impressed with Hoffman's audition he gave him the lead male role in the 1967 film The Graduate, which launched Hoffman's career.

The Apple Tree opened on Broadway on October 18, 1966, at the Shubert Theatre and ran for 463 performances, closing on November 25, 1967. It starred Barbara Harris, Alan Alda, and Larry Blyden. Robert Klein was among the ensemble members. Harris won the Tony Award for Best Actress in a Musical. The production's other major Tony nominations included Bock and Harnick for Best Composer and Lyricist, Nichols for Best Direction of a Musical, Lee Theodore for Best Choreography, and the show itself for Best Musical.

During the show's run, Alda was replaced by his and Blyden's standby, Ken Kercheval, then by Hal Holbrook. Harris was replaced by her standby, Phyllis Newman, then Carmen Alvarez and Sue Ane Langdon.

The original national tour starred Tom Ewell and Rosemary Prinz.

Alan Alda returned to play a season of the show alongside Dorothy Loudon at the Mineola Playhouse.

The Encores! staged concert production ran May 12–16, 2005, and starred Kristin Chenoweth, Malcolm Gets and Michael Cerveris.

The Roundabout Theatre Company mounted a revival that ran from December 14, 2006, until March 11, 2007, at Studio 54 with Kristin Chenoweth in Harris' roles, Brian D'Arcy James in Alda's roles, Marc Kudisch in Blyden's and Alda's recorded voice portraying God. The consensus of reviews was that the playlets themselves were showing their age, the music was interesting but not inspired, and Chenoweth's performance was the evening's significant attraction. The production ran for 18 previews and 99 regular shows for a total of 117 performances.

== Synopses ==
The Diary of Adam and Eve

In the first story, Adam awakes to find that he is required to name all of the animals. He names them simply: flyers, swimmers and crawlers. He enjoys being the "sole and single man" on Earth. Then, he meets Eve, the "long haired creature", in the garden. Eve greatly enjoys her time "Here in Eden", and begins to name everything with more detailed names: cows, ducks, horses, etc. Adam becomes annoyed with Eve and she hurts his feelings when he discovers that she thinks she is superior to him. Eve doesn't think that Adam appreciates her and he makes her feel put out, but she begins to have some "Feelings" for him. Adam builds a shelter for himself, but when he sees Eve sitting in the rain he invites her in, where she immediately begins redecorating which Adam hates. Although Adam is annoyed, he too begins to have feelings for "Eve." The two get into another argument, this time about cutting the grass around their house. After the fight, Adam storms away and Eve decides to go to a pond, where she thinks her reflection is someone just like her and that they are best "Friends". Soon, a snake appears. It seems to know everything, and tells Eve that she can know everything, too, as long as she eats the apples from the tree over the hill - the tree that Adam told her was forbidden. The snake tells her that Adam is wrong and that the apples are not "Forbidden Fruit". She eats an apple, but suddenly Adam realizes that something has happened to his "Beautiful, Beautiful World". Once the couple is out of Eden, they become closer. They now need each other more and have come to tolerate each other's weaknesses. Soon, Eve has their first child, Cain, but Adam thinks that "It's a Fish". Eve sings the baby a "Lullaby", and soon they have another son, Abel. After the boys grow up, Cain kills Abel and Eve reflects on her life, including her feelings for Adam. She tells Adam that she wants the two of them to die together, or at least have her die first because she needs him more than he needs her (to which he protests). She then reflects on "What Makes Me Love Him". Eve dies, and Adam, who has never cared much for flowers, begins to water her garden, because she loved the flowers so much.

The Lady or the Tiger?

The second story takes place in a somewhat barbaric kingdom. The story, told by a balladeer, is about love and jealousy ("I'll Tell You a Truth"). He introduces King Arik and his daughter Princess Barbára entering a great banquet that is being held ("Make Way"). They show a traditional trial: the prisoner is put into a large arena with two doors. Behind one door is a beautiful woman - if the prisoner chooses that door, he is innocent and is required to marry the woman. Behind the other door is a ravenous tiger. If the prisoner chooses that door, he is deemed guilty and the tiger will kill him. After the trial, the King's Captain Sanjar returns from a long battle that they have won. The captain collapses, but the King and his court leave him there and decide to celebrate. A slave, Nadjira, stays behind to comfort him, but Princess Barbára comes back and orders that she leave. It is then discovered that Barbára and Sanjar are in love, but that because of class no one can know. They discuss their "Forbidden Love" and consider running away to Gaul. They realize that their place is here, and while they are stealing a kiss, King Arik walks in and catches them. Arik sentences Sanjar to a trial, much to Barbára's dismay. She decides to find out which door the tiger is behind so that Sanjar is not slaughtered. She asks the Royal Tiger Keeper (who is also the balladeer) to tell her which door hides the tiger. He tells her, but first warns her about having the information. She sings to herself, "I've Got What You Want", until she sees Nadjira being led to the arena to hide behind the other door. Barbára had forgotten about this door, but she now realizes that he will have to marry Nadjira if he doesn't chose the other door ("Tiger, Tiger"). King Arik, Princess Barbára and their court entourage enter the arena ("Make Way (reprise)") and the court contemplates "Which Door" Sanjar will choose. Sanjar begs Barbára to tell him which door to choose, and hesitating, she points to a door. The balladeer reenters and sings about the pains of jealousy ("I'll Tell You a Truth (reprise)"). What lies behind the door Barbára chooses for Sanjar is not revealed.

Passionella

A Narrator tells of Ella, who sings about the perils of being a chimney sweep and how great it would be to be famous ("Oh, to Be a Movie Star"). One day, Ella comes home to find that her television is not working. Suddenly her Friendly Neighborhood Godmother (also the narrator) appears and grants her "her most cherished wish." Instantly, Ella becomes "Gorgeous"; however she can only be Passionella from the seven o'clock news until the end of the late show (7 P.M. until 4 A.M.). She then leaves her house ("Who Is She?") A producer signs her to a lifetime contract, and she instantly becomes a star. Men love her and women wish to be exactly like her, and she knows exactly how they feel ("I Know"). Ella is still sad, though. She has fame, beauty and "Wealth", but she wants love. She meets Flip, a famous singer who is also a hippie, and falls in love with him, but he rejects her, telling her "You Are Not Real". Because of this, Passionella goes to her producer and tells him that she will retire unless she can play a chimney sweep in her next movie. He agrees, and Passionella wins the Academy Award for her role. Flip presents the award to her, and he realizes that he loves her and proposes marriage. The couple makes love in front of the television, but they lose track of time, and suddenly it is 4 A.M. Passionella is now Ella, but Flip is no longer Flip, either - he is bespectacled square George L. Brown. They get to know each other's true self and live happily ever after.

== Songs ==
The Diary of Adam and Eve

- Eden Prelude
- Here in Eden
- Feelings
- Eve
- Friends
- The Apple Tree (Forbidden Fruit)
- Beautiful, Beautiful World
- It's a Fish
- Go to Sleep, Whatever You Are (Lullaby)
- What Makes Me Love Him?
- Eden Postlude

The Lady or the Tiger?

- The Lady or the Tiger Prelude
- I'll Tell You a Truth
- Make Way
- Forbidden Love (in Gaul)
- The Apple Tree Reprise
- I've Got What You Want
- Tiger, Tiger
- Make Way Reprise
- Which Door?
- I'll Tell You a Truth Reprise

Passionella

- Passionella Prelude
- Oh, to Be a Movie Star
- Gorgeous
- (Who, Who, Who, Who) Who Is She?
- I Know
- Wealth
- You Are Not Real
- Postlude

== Awards and nominations ==
=== Original Broadway production ===
Year	Award ceremony	Category	Nominee	Result
1967	Tony Award	Best Musical		Nominated
1967	Tony Award	Best Composer and Lyricist	Jerry Bock and Sheldon Harnick	Nominated
1967	Tony Award	Best Performance by a Leading Actor in a Musical	Alan Alda	Nominated
1967	Tony Award	Best Performance by a Leading Actress in a Musical	Barbara Harris	Won
1967	Tony Award	Best Direction of a Musical	Mike Nichols	Nominated
1967	Tony Award	Best Choreography	Lee Theodore	Nominated
1967	Tony Award	Best Costume Design	Tony Walton	Nominated

=== 2006 Broadway revival ===
Year	Award	Category	Nominee	Result
2007	Tony Award	Best Revival of a Musical		Nominated
2007	Drama Desk Award	Outstanding Revival of a Musical		Nominated
2007	Drama Desk Award	Outstanding Actress in a Musical	Kristin Chenoweth	Nominated
2007	Drama Desk Award	Outstanding Orchestrations	Jonathan Tunick	Nominated
2007	Outer Critics Circle Award	Outstanding Revival of a Musical		Nominated
2007	Outer Critics Circle Award	Outstanding Actress in a Musical	Kristin Chenoweth	Nominated
