= Gina Ferrall =

American theater actress (1958–2026)

Gina Ferrall (September 6, 1958 – June 2026) was an American theater actress.

== Life and career ==
Ferrall was born in San Francisco, California, on September 6, 1958. She made her debut on Broadway in March 1987, in the role of Madame Thénardier in the original run of Les Misérables. She also worked on other major productions, including Leopoldstadt and Mamma Mia!.

Ferrall died of uterine sarcoma in June 2026, at the age of 67.
