= Jerry Bock =

American musical theatre composer (1928–2010)

- Born: Jerrold Lewis Bock; November 23, 1928; New Haven, Connecticut, U.S.
- Died: November 3, 2010 (aged 81); Mount Kisco, New York, U.S.
- Education: University of Wisconsin, Madison (BA)
- Occupation: Composer
- Years active: 1955–2010

Jerrold Lewis Bock (November 23, 1928 – November 3, 2010) was an American musical theater composer. He received the Tony Award for Best Musical and the Pulitzer Prize for Drama with Sheldon Harnick for their 1959 musical Fiorello! and the Tony Award for Best Composer and Lyricist for the 1964 musical Fiddler on the Roof with Sheldon Harnick.

== Biography ==
Born in New Haven, Connecticut, and raised in Flushing, Queens, New York, Bock studied the piano as a child. While a student at the University of Wisconsin–Madison, he wrote the musical Big As Life, which toured the state and enjoyed a run in Chicago. After graduation, he spent three summers at the Tamiment Playhouse in the Poconos and wrote for early television revues with lyricist Larry Holofcener. One of their songs, the three-part "The Story of Alice," was performed by the Chad Mitchell Trio on their Blowin' in the Wind album of 1962.

=== Career ===
Bock made his Broadway debut in 1955 when he and Lawrence Holofcener contributed songs to Catch a Star. The following year the duo collaborated on the musical Mr. Wonderful, designed for Sammy Davis Jr., after which they worked on Ziegfeld Follies of 1956, which closed out-of-town.

Shortly after, Bock met lyricist Sheldon Harnick, with whom he forged a successful partnership. Although their first joint venture, The Body Beautiful, failed to charm the critics, its score caught the attention of director George Abbott and producer Hal Prince. They hired the team to compose a musical biography of former New York City mayor Fiorello La Guardia. Fiorello! (1959) earned Bock and Harnick the New York Drama Critics' Circle Award for Best Musical, Tony Award for Best Musical (tied with the team from The Sound of Music) and the Pulitzer Prize for Drama.

Bock's additional collaborations with Harnick include Tenderloin (1960), Man in the Moon (1963), She Loves Me (1963), Fiddler on the Roof (1964), The Apple Tree (1966), and The Rothschilds (1970), as well as contributions to Never Too Late (1962), Baker Street (1965), Her First Roman (1968), and The Madwoman of Central Park West (1979). Fiddler on the Roof included the hit song "If I Were a Rich Man".

Established in 1997, the Jerry Bock Award for Excellence in Musical Theater is an annual grant presented to the composer and lyricist of a project developed in the BMI Lehman Engel Musical Theater Workshop.

Bock spoke at the funeral of 98-year-old Fiddler playwright Joseph Stein just 10 days before his own death, from heart failure at 81, less than three weeks before his 82nd birthday.

== Awards and nominations ==
Year	Award	Category	Work	Result
1960	New York Drama Critics' Circle Award	Best Musical	Fiorello!	Won
1960	Tony Award	Best Musical	Fiorello!	Won
1960	Pulitzer Prize	Drama	Fiorello!	Won
1964	Grammy Award	Best Score from an Original Cast Show Album	She Loves Me	Won
1965	Tony Award	Best Composer and Lyricist	Fiddler on the Roof	Won
1965	New York Drama Critics' Circle Award	Best Musical	Fiddler on the Roof	Won
1967	Tony Award	Best Composer and Lyricist	The Apple Tree	Nominated
1971	Tony Award	Best Original Score	The Rothschilds	Nominated
2010	Daytime Emmy Award	Outstanding Original Song - Children's and Animation	Wonder Pets!	Won
