= Sheldon Harnick =

American lyricist and songwriter (1924–2023)

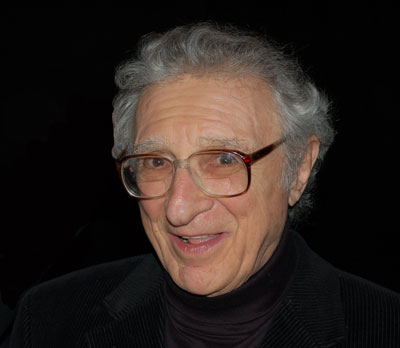
- Harnick in 2006

Background information
- Born: Sheldon Mayer Harnick; April 30, 1924; Chicago, Illinois, U.S.
- Died: June 23, 2023 (aged 99) New York City, New York, U.S.
- Genres: Musical theater
- Occupation: Lyricist
- Years active: 1949–2023
- Spouses: Mary Boatner (m. 1950; ann. 1957); Elaine May (m. 1962; div. 1963); Margery Gray (m. 1965)

Sheldon Mayer Harnick (April 30, 1924 – June 23, 2023) was an American lyricist and songwriter best known for his collaborations with composer Jerry Bock on musicals such as Fiorello!, She Loves Me, and Fiddler on the Roof.

== Early life ==
Sheldon Mayer Harnick was born to his parents Esther (Kanter) and Harry M. Harnick, a dentist, in Chicago on April 30, 1924. He grew up in the Chicago neighborhood of Portage Park. He took an interest in music from an early age, playing the violin as a child. He began writing music while a student at Carl Schurz High School.

== Musical career ==
After serving in the U.S. Army, Harnick graduated from the Northwestern University School of Music (1946–1949) with a Bachelor of Music degree, and worked with various orchestras in the Chicago area. He then moved to New York City and wrote for many musicals and revues. He was friends with Charlotte Rae from college, and he went to see her one night at the Village Vanguard where she was singing a revue. Yip Harburg, who was one of Harnick's idols, heard she was singing a song of his and decided to come. He told Harnick that he enjoyed his writing, and urged him to continue. Harburg advised Harnick to work with a large number of composers. He also counseled him to write character and comic songs, not ballads, for Broadway. Harnick’s composition "The Merry Minuet" was popularized by The Kingston Trio.

Around 1956, Harnick met Jerry Bock, forming "what is arguably the most important musical partnership of the '60s." Their first musical was The Body Beautiful, running for only 60 performances in 1958, but Fiorello! (1959) ran for 795 performances and won the Pulitzer Prize for Drama as well as the Tony Award for Best Musical. Fiddler on the Roof (1964) "became one of the most cherished of all Broadway musicals." Other Broadway successes for Harnick included She Loves Me (1963), The Apple Tree (1966) and The Rothschilds (1970).

Harnick wrote the libretto for the opera Coyote Tales, with music by Henry Mollicone, which received its world premiere at the Lyric Opera of Kansas City in March 1998. He wrote the book, music and lyrics to the musical Dragons, which was performed in 2003 at the Luna Stage in Montclair, New Jersey. He wrote the lyrics and co-wrote the book with Norton Juster for the musical The Phantom Tollbooth, based on the book by Juster. The musical premiered at the Kennedy Center in 2007.

Harnick released the album Sheldon Harnick: Hidden Treasures (1949–2013) in 2014, which includes recordings of song demos and pieces cut from Broadway shows from his private collection. In 2020, Harnick worked on a musical adaptation of the Soviet play The Dragon by Evgeny Schwartz.

== Personal life ==
Harnick was married three times. His 1950 marriage to Mary Boatner was annulled in 1957. His marriage to Elaine May lasted only a year, from 1962 until their divorce in 1963. In 1965, he married Margery Grey. They had two children and lived in an apartment at The Beresford, a building on the Upper West Side of Manhattan. Harnick died there on June 23, 2023, aged 99.

== Stage productions ==
- New Faces of 1952 (1952) (music)
- Shangri-La (1956) (music)
- The Body Beautiful (1958) (Bock)
- Portofino (1958) (lyrics with Richard Ney)
- Fiorello! (1959) (Bock) (winner of the Pulitzer Prize for Drama)
- Songs to Ford-ify Your Future (1959) (Bock), an industrial musical for the Ford Motor Company
- Tenderloin (1960) (Bock)
- Smiling the Boy Fell Dead (1961) (David Baker)
- She Loves Me (1963) (Bock)
- Fiddler on the Roof (1964) (Bock)
- The Apple Tree (1966) (Bock)
- Her First Roman (1968) (Bock, brought in to fix show)
- The Rothschilds (1970) (Bock)
- Pinocchio (1973) (Mary Rodgers)
- Captain Jinks of the Horse Marines (1975) (Jack Beeson)
- Alice in Wonderland (1975) (Joe Raposo)
- Rex (1976) (Richard Rodgers)
- The Madwoman of Central Park West (1979)
- The Umbrellas of Cherbourg (1979) (Michel Legrand) (contributed English lyrics for stage adaptation)
- A Christmas Carol (1981) (Michel Legrand)
- A Wonderful Life (1986) (Joe Raposo)
- Cyrano: The Musical (1993) (contributed English lyrics)
- The Phantom Tollbooth (1995) (lyrics, and co-credited with Norton Juster for the book)
- Coyote Tales (1998) (Henry Mollicone)
- Dragons (2003) (music by himself)
- Fiddler on the Roof (2004) (contributed lyrics for one new song, "Topsy Turvy") (Jerry Bock)
- Lady Bird: First Lady of the Land (2016)

== Honors and awards ==
- In 1960, Harnick, Bock and Jerome Weidman (book) won the Pulitzer Prize in Drama for Fiorello!.
- Harnick has won three Tony Awards. In 1960, he, Bock and Weidman tied with Rodgers and Hammerstein for best musical; that year, both Fiorello! and The Sound of Music won. And in 1965, Bock and Harnick's Fiddler on the Roof won for both Best Musical and Best Composer and Lyricist.
- In honor of Harnick's vast influence on American music, on May 19, 1984, he was awarded the University of Pennsylvania Glee Club Award of Merit. Beginning in 1964, this award "established to bring a declaration of appreciation to an individual each year that has made a significant contribution to the world of music and helped to create a climate in which our talents may find valid expression."
- Harnick was honored at the Twenty-Sixth Annual William Inge Theatre Festival located in Independence, Kansas, in 2007.
- Harnick and Jerry Bock were presented with the 18th Annual York Theatre Company's prestigious Oscar Hammerstein Award for Lifetime Achievement in Theatre in 2009.
- Harnick received the 2016 Drama League Award for Distinguished Achievement in Musical Theatre, as well as the 2016 Special Tony Award for Lifetime Achievement in the Theatre.
- Harnick received an honorary doctorate from Northwestern University in 2018.
- Harnick was inducted into the Songwriters Hall of Fame in 1972 and received its highest honor, the Johnny Mercer Award, in 1990.
