= Fiddler on the Roof (soundtrack) =

Soundtrack album
- Released: 1971
- Genre: Show tunes
- Label: United Artists/Liberty Records (reissue)

Professional ratings
Review scores
Source	Rating
Billboard	positive
AllMusic	4.5/5 stars

The original soundtrack to the 1971 film Fiddler on the Roof was released by United Artists Records on August 24, 1971.

The album contains popular songs from the musical including "Sunrise, Sunset", "If I Were a Rich Man", "Matchmaker" and "Tradition" sung by the film's cast, which includes Topol and Norma Crane. The music is arranged and conducted by John Williams featuring violinist Isaac Stern. The cassette and 8 track tape issues of the album contain two instrumental tracks, "Entr'act" and "The Pogrom" (listed as "First Act Finale" on later compact disc releases) not included on the original LP.

Billboard reviewed the album in its issue from 23 October 1971, writing: "The score to this [...] filmusical has been enlarged into a two-record set by rich, extended arrangements of the popular score, with guest violinist Isaac Stern featured in the instrumental segments. The score is faithful to the original..."

The album peaked at number 30 on the U.S. Billboard Top LPs chart for two consecutive weeks in January 1972.

== Original LP track listing ==
2 × LP (United Artists Records UAS 10900; Reissue: Liberty LXB-51041)

All lyrics are written by Sheldon Harnick; all music is composed by Jerry Bock.

Side 1
No.	Title	Length
1.	"Prologue and "Tradition" & main title"	11:16
2.	"Matchmaker"	3:55

Side 2
No.	Title	Length
1.	"If I Were a Rich Man"	5:24
2.	"Sabbath Prayer"	2:39
3.	"To Life"	6:13
4.	"Miracle of Miracles"	2:04

Side 3
No.	Title	Length
1.	"Tevye's Dream"	6:42
2.	"Sunrise, Sunset"	3:49
3.	"Wedding Celebration and "The Bottle Dance""	3:52

Side 4
No.	Title	Length
1.	"Do You Love Me?"	3:11
2.	"Far from the Home I Love"	3:00
3.	"Chava Ballet Sequence"	2:33
4.	"Anatevka"	3:37
5.	"Finale"	1:48

== Charts ==
Chart (1971–1972)	Peak position
UK Albums (Official Charts)	26
US Billboard Top LPs	30

== Certifications ==
Region	Certification	Certified units/sales
United States (RIAA)	Platinum	1,000,000^{^}
^{^} Shipments figures based on certification alone.
