= Fiddler on the Roof (original Broadway cast recording) =

Fiddler on the Roof: The Original Broadway Cast Recording

Cast recording by the original Broadway cast
- Released: 1964
- Recorded: 1964
- Genre: Show tunes
- Length: 49:37
- Label: RCA Victor

Professional ratings
Review scores
Source	Rating
AllMusic	5/5 stars

Fiddler on the Roof, subtitled The Original Broadway Cast Recording, is an album containing a recording of the 1964 Broadway musical Fiddler on the Roof made by its original cast. The album was released in the same year on RCA Victor (LOC/LSO-1093).

The album peaked at number 7 on the U.S. Billboard Top LPs chart for two consecutive weeks in January–February 1965 and finished 1965 as the fifth best-selling album of the year in the United States according to Billboard.

In 1986, the album was first issued on compact disc as RCA Red Seal RCD1-7060.

In 2020, the recording was selected by the Library of Congress for preservation in the National Recording Registry for being "culturally, historically, or aesthetically significant".

== Track listing ==
LP (RCA Victor LSO-1093)

Side 1
No.	Title	Artist(s)	Length
1.	"Tradition"	Zero Mostel and chorus	6:50
2.	"Matchmaker, Matchmaker"	Joanna Merlin, Julia Migenes and Tanya Everett	3:39
3.	"If I Were a Rich Man"	Zero Mostel	4:52
4.	"Sabbath Prayer"	Zero Mostel, Maria Karnilova and chorus	2:22
5.	"To Life"	Zero Mostel, Michael Granger and men	4:08
6.	"Miracle of Miracles"	Austin Pendleton	1:58

Side 2
No.	Title	Artist(s)	Length
1.	"Tevye's Dream (The Tailor Motel Kamzoil)"	Zero Mostel, Maria Karnilova, Sue Babel, Carol Sawyer and chorus	6:07
2.	"Sunrise, Sunset"	Zero Mostel, Maria Karnilova and chorus	3:30
3.	"Now I Have Everything"	Bert Convy and Julia Migenes	2:00
4.	"Do You Love Me?"	Zero Mostel and Maria Karnilova	3:04
5.	"Far from the Home I Love"	Julia Migenes and Zero Mostel	3:25
6.	"Anatevka"	Zero Mostel, Maria Karnilova, Beatrice Arthur, Michael Granger, Leonard Frey, Paul Lipson	3:05

== Charts ==
=== Weekly charts ===
Chart (1964–1968)	Peak position
Norwegian Albums (VG-lista)	11
US Billboard Top LPs	7

=== Year-end charts ===
Chart (1965)	Position
US Billboard 200	5

== Certifications ==
Region	Certification	Certified units/sales
United States (RIAA)	2× Platinum	2,000,000^{^}
^{^} Shipments figures based on certification alone.

== Awards ==
Year	Award type	Categories	Results	Ref.
1965	Grammy Awards	Best Score from an Original Cast Show Album	Nominated	
