= Fiddler on the Roof (London cast recording) =

Fiddler on the Roof: Original London Cast Recording

Cast recording by the original London cast
- Released: 1967
- Genre: Show tunes
- Length: 50:15
- Label: CBS Records

Professional ratings
Review scores
Source	Rating
AllMusic	4/5 stars
AllMusic	no rating (2001 CD)

Fiddler on the Roof, subtitled Original London Cast Recording, is the album containing the original studio cast recording of the 1967 London production of the musical Fiddler on the Roof. The album was released on CBS Records in the same year.

The album peaked at number 4 on the UK albums chart for two consecutive weeks in July–August 1967.

== Track listing ==
LP (CBS 70030)

All lyrics are written by Sheldon Harnick; all music is composed by Jerry Bock.

Side 1
No.	Title	Artist(s)	Length
1.	"Tradition"	Topol
2.	"Matchmaker"	Caryl Little, Linda Gardner, Rosemary Nicols
3.	"If I Were a Rich Man"	Topol
4.	"Sabbath Prayer"	Miriam Karlin, Topol
5.	"To Life"	Maurice Lane, Paul Whitsun-Jones, Topol
6.	"Miracle of Miracles"	Jonathan Lynn

Side 2
No.	Title	Artist(s)	Length
1.	"Tevye's Dream"	Heather Clifton, Miriam Karlin, Susan Paule, Topol
2.	"Sunrise, Sunset"	Miriam Karlin, Topol
3.	"Bottle Dance"
4.	"Now I Have Everything"	Linda Gardner, Sandor Eles
5.	"Do You Love Me?"	Miriam Karlin, Topol
6.	"Far from the Home I Love"	Linda Gardner, Topol
7.	"Anatevka"	Brian Hewitt-Jones, Cynthia Grenville, George Little, Miriam Karlin, Paul Whitsun-Jones, Topol

== Cast ==
- Topol
- Miriam Karlin

Directed and choreographed by Jerome Robbins.

== Charts ==
Chart (1967)	Peak position
UK Albums (Official Charts)	4
