= Fiddler on the Roof (disambiguation) =

Fiddler on the Roof is a 1964 Broadway musical.

Fiddler on the Roof may also refer to:

- Fiddler on the Roof (original Broadway cast recording), a 1964 album
- Cannonball Adderley's Fiddler on the Roof, a 1964 album by Cannonball Adderley
- Fiddler on the Roof (London cast recording), a 1967 album
- Fiddler on the Roof (film), a 1971 film adaptation of the musical
  - Fiddler on the Roof (soundtrack), a 1971 album containing the original soundtrack to the film
- Fiddler on the Roof Award, Russia
