= Fiddler on the Roof (film) =

1971 film by Norman Jewison

- Theatrical release poster by Ted CoConis
- Directed by: Norman Jewison
- Screenplay by: Joseph Stein
- Based on: Fiddler on the Roof by: Joseph Stein; Jerry Bock; Sheldon Harnick; Tevye and His Daughters by Sholem Aleichem
- Produced by: Norman Jewison
- Starring: Chaim Topol; Norma Crane; Leonard Frey; Molly Picon; Paul Mann
- Cinematography: Oswald Morris
- Edited by: Antony Gibbs; Robert Lawrence
- Music by: Jerry Bock; Adapted Score: John Williams
- Production companies: The Mirisch Company; Cartier Productions
- Distributed by: United Artists
- Release date: November 3, 1971
- Running time: 181 minutes
- Country: United States
- Language: English
- Budget: $9 million
- Box office: $83.3 million

Fiddler on the Roof is a 1971 American musical drama film based on the 1964 stage musical by Joseph Stein, Jerry Bock, and Sheldon Harnick, which itself is based on Tevye and His Daughters, a series of short stories by Sholem Aleichem. Directed by Norman Jewison from a screenplay by Stein, the film centers on Tevye, a poor Jewish milkman in early 20th-century Ukraine in Imperial Russia who is faced with the challenge of marrying off his five daughters amidst the growing tensions in his shtetl. The film stars Chaim Topol (reprising his role from the stage production), Norma Crane, Leonard Frey, Molly Picon, Paul Mann, Rosalind Harris, Michèle Marsh, Neva Small and Paul Michael Glaser. The musical score, composed by Bock with lyrics by Harnick, was adapted and conducted by John Williams.

Filmed at Pinewood Studios in England and on-location in the SR Croatia, Fiddler on the Roof was theatrically released on November 3, 1971, by United Artists to critical and commercial success. Reviewers praised Jewison's direction, the screenplay, and the performances of the cast, while the film grossed $83.3 million worldwide on a $9 million budget, becoming the highest-grossing film of 1971.

The film received a leading eight nominations at the 44th Academy Awards, including for Best Picture and Best Director, and won three: Best Score Adaptation (Williams), Best Cinematography (Oswald Morris) and Best Sound (Gordon K. McCallum, David Hildyard). The film also won two Golden Globes: Best Motion Picture – Musical or Comedy and Best Actor in a Motion Picture – Musical or Comedy for Topol.

The film has continued to receive acclaim since its release and is often considered to be one of the greatest musical films of all time. An independently produced documentary about the making of the film, titled Fiddler's Journey to the Big Screen, was released in 2022.

== Plot ==
The film takes place in 1905, in the fictional village of Anatevka, a typical shtetl somewhere in Ukraine, part of the Pale of Settlement in Imperial Russia. Tevye is Anatevka's poor Jewish milkman; he and his bossy, sharp-tongued wife Golde have five daughters: Tzeitel, Hodel, Chava, Shprintze and Bielke. Tevye compares the lives of the Jews of Anatevka to a "fiddler on the roof", using tradition to "scratch out a pleasant, simple tune" without breaking their necks.

Yente, the local matchmaker, has arranged for Tevye's eldest daughter, Tzeitel, to marry Lazar Wolf, Anatevka's affluent butcher, who is older than Tevye. However, Tzeitel is in love with her childhood sweetheart, Motel Kamzoil, the tailor; Tevye does not think very highly of Motel, considering him timid and meek. Worried that Yente will soon find her a husband, Tzeitel urges Motel to ask Tevye for her hand. Motel is reluctant, afraid of Tevye's temper and tradition dictates that marriages must be arranged by a matchmaker. Motel is also very poor and is saving money to buy a sewing machine to show Tevye that he is able to support a wife.

While making his rounds, Tevye meets Perchik, a Jewish student from the university in Kyiv. Perchik has modern religious ideas and Bolshevik political views; the local men dismiss him as a radical but Tevye takes a liking to Perchik and invites him to Join his family for the Sabbath meal and offers him room and board in exchange for tutoring his two youngest daughters. Upon arriving home, Golde informs Tevye that Lazar Wolf wants to see him, but does not tell him why, knowing that Tevye doesn't like Lazar. Tevye assumes that Lazar wants to discuss buying his milk cow to slaughter.

After the Sabbath, Tevye visits Lazar and once the misunderstanding over the cow is cleared up, he agrees to the match; Tevye reasons that if Tzeitel marries a wealthy butcher, she surely will never go hungry. The two men then go to a nearby tavern and everyone celebrates Lazar's good fortune with drinking and dancing. On his way home, Tevye meets the local Constable who warns him that a pogrom (calling it an "unofficial demonstration") by a gang of thugs will take place in Anateveka in the near future. The Constable is sympathetic toward the Jews but is powerless to prevent the violence.

The next day, Tevye informs Tzeitel that she is now engaged to marry Lazar Wolf. Devastated, Tzeitel begs her father not to force her to marry the butcher. At first, Tevye is adamant that she marry Lazar but after Motel arrives, he tells Tevye that he and Tzeitel gave each other a pledge to marry. Tevye is incredulous, but after some soul-searching and consideration of their feelings, he finally relents and gives Tzeitel and Motel permission to marry, despite Lazar Wolf's humiliation. Worried that Golde will not accept the marriage, Tevye pretends to have a nightmare in which Tzeitel is fated to marry Motel and Fruma-Sarah, Lazar's dead wife, will seek terrible retribution if Tzeitel marries the butcher. The superstitious Golde interprets Tevye's false dream to be prophetic and believes that Tzeitel's marriage to Motel is for the best.

The wedding day arrives and all the Jews of Anatevka attend the ceremony. There is much celebration until an argument erupts between Lazar Wolf and Tevye over the broken agreement. Perchik tells everyone that it should be left for the couple to decide who they marry. He creates further controversy when he asks Hodel to dance with him, crossing the Mechitza. Initially, the crowd is shocked but they soon warm to the idea and the wedding proceeds with great joy. Suddenly, a mob arrives and the pogrom begins; when Perchik attempts to intervene, he is injured by the attackers. The Constable appears and immediately stops the raid. Sheepishly, he tells Tevye that he must follow orders. Tevye then orders everyone to clean up. As the attacks continue around Anatevka, Tevye is bewildered and silently wonders why God would allow such atrocities.

Later, as Perchik prepares to leave Anatevka to participate in the revolution in Kyiv, he asks Hodel to marry him and she accepts. When Hodel and Perchik tell Tevye of their intention to marry without his permission, Tevye is initially furious but he ultimately gives them his blessing because they love each other. During a demonstration in Kyiv, Perchik is arrested and exiled to Siberia. Hodel leaves home to join him there, much to Tevye's sorrow.

Meanwhile, Tevye's third daughter, Chava, has fallen in love with Fyedka, a young gentile. As with Tzeitel and Hodel, Tevye attempts to understand Chava's feelings but concludes that he cannot countenance his daughter marrying outside the Jewish faith. Chava and Fyedka elope and marry in an Orthodox Christian church. When Tevye learns of the marriage from Golde, he tells her Chava is now dead to them. Chava appears and begs her father for his acceptance, but Tevye ostracizes her.

Finally, the people of Anatevka are notified by the Constable that they have three days to vacate the village; after that, the Imperial Russian government will force the Jews to leave. Tevye, his family and their neighbors pack and head variously for New York, Chicago, Jerusalem, the Land of Israel and other places they have never been. Chava and Fyedka arrive to inform Tevye that the two of them are moving to Kraków, Poland. As they say their goodbyes, Tevye at first is silent but then quietly says "God be with you", which Tzeitel happily repeats to the couple. Tzeitel, Motel and their baby will join the family in America when they have saved enough money. As Tevye pulls his wagon full of possessions down the muddy road, he hears the fiddler playing behind him; he motions for the fiddler to follow as Tevye, Golde and their two youngest daughters continue down the road.

== Cast ==
- Chaim Topol as Tevye, the milkman of Anatevka
- Norma Crane as Golde, his wife
- Rosalind Harris as Tzeitel, the oldest daughter
- Michèle Marsh as Hodel, the second daughter
- Neva Small as Chava, the third daughter
- Molly Picon as Yente, the matchmaker
- Paul Mann as Lazar Wolf, the butcher, Tzeitel's older suitor
- Leonard Frey as Motel Kamzoil, the tailor, Tzeitel's eventual husband
- Paul Michael Glaser (Note: Credited as 'Michael Glaser'.) as Perchik, the student revolutionary, Hodel's eventual husband
- Raymond Lovelock as Fyedka, a Christian farmer, Chava's eventual husband
- Elaine Edwards as Shprintze, the fourth daughter
- Candy Bonstein as Bielke, the fifth daughter
- Shimen Rushkin as Mordcha
- Zvee Scooler as Rabbi
- Louis Zorich as Constable
- Alfie Scopp as Avram
- Howard Goorney as Nachum
- Barry Dennen as Mendel, the rabbi's son
- Ruth Madoc as Fruma-Sarah, the butcher's late wife
- Patience Collier as Grandmother Tzeitel
- Arnold Diamond as Moishe
- Marika Rivera as Rifka
- Aharon Ipalé as Sheftel
- Roger Lloyd-Pack as Sexton
- Carl Jaffe as Isaac
- Vernon Dobtcheff as Russian official
- Tutte Lemkow as the fiddler

== Musical numbers ==
All songs by Jerry Bock and Sheldon Harnick, arranged by John Williams.

1. "Prologue / Tradition" – Tevye and Company
2. "Overture"
3. "Matchmaker, Matchmaker" – Tzeitel, Hodel, Chava, Shprintze and Bielke
4. "If I Were a Rich Man" – Tevye
5. "Sabbath Prayer" – Tevye, Golde and Chorus
6. "To Life" – Tevye, Lazar Wolf, Townsmen and Cossacks
7. "Tevye's Monologue (Tzeitel and Motel)" – Tevye
8. "Miracle of Miracles" – Motel
9. "Tevye's Dream" – Tevye, Golde, Grandmother Tzeitel, Rabbi, Fruma-Sarah and Ghostly chorus
10. "Sunrise, Sunset" – Tevye, Golde, Perchik, Hodel and Guests
11. "Wedding Celebration / The Bottle Dance"
12. "Entr'acte" – Orchestra
13. "Tradition" (Reprise) – Chorus
14. "Tevye's Monologue (Hodel and Perchik)" – Tevye
15. "Do You Love Me?" – Tevye and Golde
16. "Far from the Home I Love" – Hodel
17. "Chava Ballet Sequence (Little Bird, Little Chavaleh)" – Tevye
18. "Tevye's Monologue (Chava and Fyedka)" – Tevye
19. "Anatevka" – Tevye, Golde, Lazar Wolf, Yente, Mendel, Mordcha and Full company
20. "Exit Music"

== Differences from Broadway ==
The film follows the plot of the stage play very closely, retaining nearly all of the play's dialogue, although it omits the songs "Now I Have Everything" and "The Rumor (I Just Heard)". Lyrical portions of "Tevye's Dream (tailor Motel Kamzoil)" were omitted to avoid repetition. The film's soundtrack album contained some of these omissions, including Golde blessing herself before going back to sleep after Tevye describes the dream.

Changes were also made in the song "Tradition", with the film omitting the dialogue between Reb Nachum the beggar (who, in the film, seems to have difficulty speaking) and Lazar Wolf as well as dialogue spoken by Yente and Avram. When the family roles are introduced, the "sons" chorus is cut, causing the "sons" verse to roll directly into the "daughters" verse. In addition, in the film, two men argue about whether a horse claimed to be six years old was actually twelve, rather than whether the horse was actually a mule. The original soundtrack LP release retained their names, Yitzhak and Avram, however this was omitted in the film's release. Instead, an on-set, improvised take of Topol (saying "he sold him"), rather than the recorded dubbing, was used.

Six additional scenes were added to the film:

1. The Constable receives orders from his superior for a "demonstration" against the Jews (referred to by the superior as "Christ-killers") in Anatevka.
2. Perchik is arrested at a workers' rally in Kyiv.
3. The rabbi and his students inside the synagogue receive news of the arrival of Motel's new sewing machine.
4. Golde goes to the priest to look for Chava (described by her in the stage production). She is confronted there with Christian images (of historically Jewish individuals) in a juxtaposition with the synagogue montage at the start of the film.
5. The rabbi takes the Torah out of the ark inside the synagogue for the last time. He weeps and chants quietly about having to abandon the synagogue.
6. Tevye feeds his animals in the barn for the final time. He tells his lame horse to take care of his leg and to treat his new master well.

The scene with Hodel and Perchik, where he plans to leave for Kyiv, was extended in the film. A new song sung by Perchik was recorded ("Any Day Now"), but was omitted from the final print; however, it was included in the 2004 reissue of the soundtrack. The song was later implemented in the 2018 Yiddish production as a song sung by Perchik to Shprintze and Bielke. In 1979, a shorter version of the film was re-released to theaters, cutting 32 minutes, including the songs "Far from the Home I Love" and "Anatevka".

In the stage version, Tevye and Lazar Wolf meet in a tavern to discuss Lazar's proposed marriage to Tzeitel; in the film, Tevye goes to Lazar's home, which is well appointed and filled with objets d'art. The two then walk to the tavern for a celebratory drink.

Although a faithful adaptation of the original stage version, Fiddler scholar Jan Lisa Huttner has noted several differences between stage and screen. She argues that changes in American culture and politics and developments in Israel led the filmmakers to portray certain characters differently and to offer a different version of Anatevka. Huttner also notes that the "Chagall color palette" of the original Broadway production was exchanged for a grittier, more realistic depiction of the village of Anatevka.

== Production ==
Principal photography was done on location in Yugoslavia and at Pinewood Studios in Buckinghamshire, England. Most of the exterior shots were done in Mala Gorica, Lekenik, and Zagreb within the Yugoslav constituent republic of Croatia. One reason the area was chosen was because of the heavy snow present during location scouting in 1969; however, during the actual filming in 1970, there was no snowfall and the producers had to ship in marble dust to stand in for snow. Additional scenes were shot at the Jadran Film studios. 300 extras conversant in various foreign languages were used, as were flocks of geese and pigs and their handlers.

=== Casting ===
The casting of Chaim Topol as Tevye was somewhat controversial, as Zero Mostel had originated the role on Broadway and was closely identified with it. Years later, Jewison said he felt Mostel's larger-than-life personality, while fine on stage, would cause film audiences to see him as Mostel, rather than the character of Tevye. Before Topol was cast, Orson Welles, Anthony Quinn and Marlon Brando were all considered.

Rosalind Harris, who played Tzeitel, was previously Bette Midler's understudy in the role during the original Broadway production. Leonard Frey, who played Motel, originated the role of Mendel the Rabbi's son on Broadway and also understudied Motel, while Zvee Scooler, who played the Rabbi, originated the role of Mordcha, the innkeeper.

Assi Dayan, a well-known Israeli actor and filmmaker, was originally cast as Perchik, but had difficulty with the English dialogue and was replaced by Paul Michael Glaser. Rob Reiner auditioned for the role of Motel. Richard Thomas was Jewison's original choice to play Fyedka, but ultimately, Italian actor Ray Lovelock was cast in the part. Though Lovelock was a singer who released several records, he did not appear in any of the film's musical numbers.

Talia Shire and Katey Sagal both auditioned to play Tevye's daughters.

Norman Jewison makes two cameo appearances, first as the voice of the rabbi in the "Tevye's Dream" number, and later as a wedding guest.

Fiddler on the Roof was the final film of Norma Crane, who died of breast cancer in 1973, two years after its release.

=== Music ===
The music for the film was conducted and adapted by John Williams from the original score by Jerry Bock. Williams also composed additional music and an original cadenza for Isaac Stern, who performed the various violin solos in the film.

The score was orchestrated by Williams and Alexander Courage.

== Release ==
=== Roadshow presentation ===
Because the film follows the stage musical so closely, and the musical did not have an overture, the filmmakers chose to eliminate the customary film overture played before the beginning of most motion pictures shown in a roadshow-style presentation. However, there is a solo by the Fiddler played over the opening credits (after the conclusion of "Tradition"), an intermission featuring entr'acte music, and exit music played at the end after the closing credits.

=== Reception ===
Although film musicals had largely fallen from favor by the early 1970s, Fiddler on the Roof was a success for United Artists, earning profits of $6.1 million, plus distribution profits of $8 million.

On review aggregator website Rotten Tomatoes, the film holds an 81% rating based on 78 reviews, with an average of 7.80/10. The consensus summarizes: "A bird may love a fish - and musical fans will love this adaptation of Fiddler on the Roof, even if it is not quite as transcendent as the long-running stage version." Metacritic, which uses a weighted average, assigned the film a score of 67 out of 100, based on 13 critics, indicating "generally favorable" reviews.

Roger Ebert thought the storyline of the musical was "quite simply boring", but still gave the screen version three stars out of four, explaining that Jewison "has made as good a film as can be made" from the material. Gene Siskel awarded three-and-a-half stars out of four, writing that the musical numbers were "better staged and choreographed than in any recent Broadway film adaptation". Vincent Canby of The New York Times thought the film version was inferior, explaining that by "literalizing" the show with real landscapes and houses, Jewison and Stein "have effectively overwhelmed not only Aleichem, but the best things about the stage production ... pushed beyond its limits, the music goes flat and renders banal moments that, on the stage, are immensely moving." Charles Champlin of the Los Angeles Times wrote that the film "has been done not only with such artistry, but also with such evident love, devotion, integrity and high aspiration that watching it is a kind of duplex pleasure." Gary Arnold of The Washington Post stated, "Jewison's Fiddler is a great film, by which I mean great in the sense that matters most – greatly moving, an extraordinarily powerful, emotional experience." Pauline Kael of The New Yorker called it "an absolutely smashing movie; it is not especially sensitive, it is far from delicate, and it isn't even particularly imaginative, but it seems to me the most powerful movie musical ever made."

=== Retrospective reception ===
The film continues to receive acclaim since its original release and it is often seen as one of the best musical films ever made. When the film celebrated its 50th anniversary in 2021, The Digital Bits and History, Legacy & Showmanship collaborated on a retrospective celebrating the film and its legacy, including a virtual roundtable discussion with film critics, scholars and historians regarding the film's relevance in modern times and how it would be remembered in years time. One of the participants, Matthew Kennedy, called it "a very fine and enduring work of popular entertainment. Of all the big musicals at the end of the roadshow era, this one ages the best. If anything, it looks and sounds better today than it did fifty years ago. The music, the visuals, the story that's so specific yet moves people throughout the world. Humor, heartbreak, memorable songs, big themes, and moral lessons - Fiddler has it all." In his 2021 retrospective, Devin McGrath-Conwell of Cinema Scholars wrote "This film may take place in 1905, but you can easily compare the themes of family, faith, and rebellion with more contemporary films like Rebel Without a Cause or Splendor in the Grass and find that they synch up." In conclusion, he wrote that it "remains beloved," and that "As Tevye told us, we are all fiddlers on the roof, fighting to maintain balance in a tumultuous and unpredictable world. And so, we must always seek to treat ourselves and our neighbors with the love and care of the citizens of Anatevka, and make that our "tradition."

In 2023, the film ranked number 15 on IndieWire's list of "The 60 Best Movie Musicals of All Time," with Jude Dry writing "It's hard to go wrong with such great material, yet many have failed in their attempts to translate the epic nature of a live Broadway show to the comparatively flat screen. Led by Israeli actor Chaim Topol as the indefatigable narrator Tevye (though the decision not to cast Zero Mostel was controversial at the time), the movie delivers all of the laughs, tears, and chills of the musical ... From its rousing opening to its plaintive final notes, Fiddler on the Roof is nothing less than a cinematic tradition." It also ranked number 9 on Screen Rant's list of "The 35 Best Musicals of All Time" and number 22 on Parade's list of the "67 Best Movie Musicals of All Time." In a 2021 piece for Collider, Gregory Lawrence believed modern filmmakers looking to make their own musical films should look to this film for inspiration, mainly for Norman Jewison's direction, the cinematography and the staging and handling of the musical numbers, writing "By examining the traditional filmmaking of Fiddler on the Roof and carrying the most useful techniques with them, perhaps our future musical movies can sing even brighter."

=== Awards and nominations ===
Year	Award	Category	Nominee(s)	Result	Ref.
1971	Academy Awards	Best Picture	Norman Jewison	Nominated	
1971	Academy Awards	Best Director	Norman Jewison	Nominated	
1971	Academy Awards	Best Actor	Chaim Topol	Nominated	
1971	Academy Awards	Best Supporting Actor	Leonard Frey	Nominated	
1971	Academy Awards	Best Art Direction	Art Direction: Robert F. Boyle and Michael Stringer; Set Decoration: Peter Lamont	Nominated	
1971	Academy Awards	Best Cinematography	Oswald Morris	Won	
1971	Academy Awards	Best Music: Scoring Adaptation and Original Song Score	John Williams	Won	
1971	Academy Awards	Best Sound	Gordon K. McCallum and David Hildyard	Won	
1971	American Cinema Editors Awards	Best Edited Feature Film	Antony Gibbs and Robert Lawrence	Nominated	
1971	British Academy Film Awards	Best Cinematography	Oswald Morris	Nominated	
1971	British Academy Film Awards	Best Editing	Antony Gibbs and Robert Lawrence	Nominated	
1971	British Academy Film Awards	Best Sound Track	Les Wiggins, David Hildyard, and Gordon K. McCallum	Nominated	
1971	British Society of Cinematographers Awards	Best Cinematography in a Theatrical Feature Film	Oswald Morris	Won	
1971	David di Donatello Awards	Best Foreign Actor	Chaim Topol	Won	
1971	Golden Globe Awards	Best Motion Picture – Musical or Comedy		Won	
1971	Golden Globe Awards	Best Actor in a Motion Picture – Musical or Comedy	Chaim Topol	Won	
1971	Golden Globe Awards	Best Supporting Actor – Motion Picture	Paul Mann	Nominated	
1971	Golden Globe Awards	Best Director – Motion Picture	Norman Jewison	Nominated	
1971	Golden Reel Awards	Best Sound Editing – Dialogue		Won	
1971	Sant Jordi Awards	Best Performance in a Foreign Film	Chaim Topol	Won	
1971	Writers Guild of America Awards	Best Comedy – Adapted from Another Medium	Joseph Stein	Nominated	
2007	Satellite Awards	Best DVD Extras	Fiddler on the Roof (Collector's Edition)	Nominated	

American Film Institute recognition

- AFI's 100 Years...100 Cheers - #82

== Soundtrack ==
A 2 record soundtrack album was issued by United Artists Records in 1971. The cassette and 8 track tape version featured two instrumental tracks not on the original LP release: "Entr'acte" and "The Pogrom" (tracked as "First Act Finale" on later compact disc releases).

In 2001, EMI Records issued a remastered and expanded 30th anniversary Fiddler soundtrack album on CD. This was the first release of the "First Act Finale" and "Entr'acte" on CD. The expanded CD also included the previously unreleased "Wedding Procession" track and a demo of "Any Day Now", a song that was cut from the final film.

On December 7, 2021, La-La Land Records released a limited edition 3 disc soundtrack album which featured alternate versions of songs, as well as unreleased instrumental music composed by Williams.

In February 2022, the University of Michigan School of Music, Theatre, & Dance presented a concert version of Fiddler using the arrangements by John Williams for the film. Broadway performers Chuck Cooper and Loretta Ables Sayre played the roles of Tevye and Golde accompanied by the Grand Rapids Symphony. The event was the first live performance of Williams' orchestrations for the film.

== Documentary ==
An independently produced documentary about the making of the film, Fiddler's Journey to the Big Screen, was made by Adama Films in 2021. Produced, directed and edited by Daniel Raim and featuring interviews with the surviving cast and crew members, as well as behind-the-scenes footage, it premiered at the Miami Jewish Film Festival on January 26, 2022, and was released theatrically by Kino Lorber and Zeitgeist Films that Spring. It was later made available to stream on Paramount+.

== Remake ==
On May 28, 2020, it was announced that Metro-Goldwyn-Mayer and producers Dan Jinks and Aaron Harnick would oversee a remake, with Thomas Kail (known for his work on Hamilton and Grease Live!) directing and co-producing, and Dear Evan Hansen librettist Steven Levenson penning the screenplay. In a 2026 interview with Variety, Kail gave an update regarding this project: "My hope is that it can find a home. Steven Levinson wrote a gorgeous script. It was right before the pandemic, and then the world changed. Musical storytelling seems to go in phases. If someone wants to talk about making it, I certainly would be proud to engage in any conversation."

== See also ==
- List of American films of 1971

== Sources ==
- Bial, Henry (2005). Acting Jewish: Negotiating Ethnicity on the American Stage & Screen. University of Michigan Press. p. 78. ISBN 047206908X.
- Isenberg, Barbara (2014). Tradition!: The Highly Improbable, Ultimately Triumphant Broadway-to-Hollywood Story of Fiddler on the Roof, the World's Most Beloved Musical. St. Martin's Press. p. ix. ISBN 978-1466862524.
