= Fiddler on the Roof Award =

Award by the Federation of Jewish Communities of Russia

The Fiddler on the Roof Award was an annual prize issued by the Federation of Jewish Communities of Russia (FJCR) issued during 2003–2021. It was awarded during Hanukkah to persons and organizations for significant contributions to the development of the cultural and social life of the country regardless their ethnicity or religion. There are several nominations, whose numbers and categories vary.

== History ==
The Fiddler

Green Violinist

In 2002 the FJCR instituted the award named "The Man of the Year", presented for the first time in 2003. In 2011 it was renamed to "The Fiddler on the Roof". The Fiddler on the Roof is a strong image of the Jewish culture originating in the paintings The Fiddler and Green Violinist by Marc Chagall

In 2020, the award was not issued due to the COVID-19 pandemic.
