= Fiorello! =

Broadway musical

- Original Logo
- Music: Jerry Bock
- Lyrics: Sheldon Harnick
- Book: Jerome Weidman; George Abbott
- Basis: Life of New York City mayor Fiorello La Guardia
- Productions: 1959 Broadway; 1962 Broadway; 1994 Broadway concert 2013 Broadway concert
- Awards: Tony Award for Best Musical (1960); Pulitzer Prize for Drama (1960)

Fiorello! is a musical about New York City mayor Fiorello La Guardia, a reform Republican, which debuted on Broadway in 1959, and tells the story of how La Guardia took on the Tammany Hall political machine. The book is by Jerome Weidman and George Abbott, drawn substantially from the 1955 volume Life with Fiorello by Ernest Cuneo, with lyrics by Sheldon Harnick, and music by Jerry Bock. It won the three major theatre awards - Tony Award (shared with The Sound of Music), the New York Drama Critics Circle award, and the Pulitzer Prize for Drama. It is one of only ten musicals to win the latter award.

== Productions ==
Fiorello! opened on Broadway at the Broadhurst Theatre on November 23, 1959, moved to The Broadway Theatre on May 9, 1961, and closed on October 28, 1961, after 795 performances. It was directed by George Abbott, with choreography by Peter Gennaro. Tom Bosley originated the title role opposite Howard Da Silva as the Republican machine boss Ben Marino. The cast featured Ellen Hanley as Thea, Pat Stanley as Dora, Patricia Wilson as Marie, Nathaniel Frey as Morris, and Broadway's future Superman, Bob Holiday, as Neil.

The 1962 production opened at the New York City Center on June 13, and closed after 16 performances, on June 24, 1962. The show was directed by Jean Dalrymple, staged by Dania Krupska, choreography by Kevin Carlisle, scenery and lighting design by William and Jean Eckart, costume supervision by Joseph Codori, musically directed by Jay Blackton, and press by Lilliam Libman. The cast included Sorrell Booke (Fiorello La Guardia), Art Lund (Ben Marino), Lola Fisher (Thea), Dody Goodman (Dora), Barbara Williams (Marie), Paul Lipson (Morris), Richard France (Neil), Dort Clark (Floyd), and Helen Verbit (Mrs. Pomerantz). One of the singing ensemble included Rosalind Cash.

A staged concert production of Fiorello! was performed at the first Encores! at the New York City Center concert series in February 1994. Directed by Walter Bobbie, the cast featured Jerry Zaks as La Guardia, Philip Bosco as Ben Marino, Faith Prince as Marie, and Elizabeth Futral as Thea.

To celebrate the 20th season of the Encores! series, Fiorello! was presented by the New York City Center Encores! as a staged concert in January 2013. With direction by Gary Griffin and choreography by Alex Sanchez, the cast starred Danny Rutigliano as La Guardia, Shuler Hensley as Marino, Erin Dilly as Marie and Kate Baldwin as Thea. The production included a new Bock/Harnick song during Act II, as part of "The Name's La Guardia" reprise.

The Berkshire Theatre Group (BTG) production of Fiorello! opened Off-Broadway at the East 13th Street Theater on September 4, 2016. Directed by Bob Moss, it received mixed reviews and ran through October 7. The BTG production first ran at The Unicorn Theatre in Stockbridge, Massachusetts in June and July 2016.

== Synopsis ==
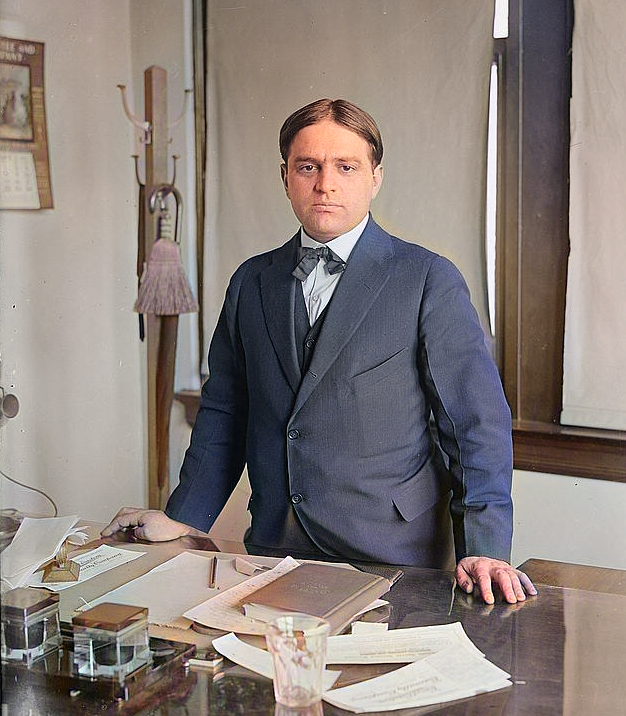
Mayor LaGuardia (colorized)

The story follows the life of Fiorello H. La Guardia during World War I and ten years later. As Mayor of New York City La Guardia reforms city politics by helping end Tammany Hall's vaunted political machine.

=== Act I ===
Mayor Fiorello H. La Guardia is reading the comics over the radio because there is a newspaper strike. As he does so, the time changes to 1915 and the law office where clients are eagerly waiting to speak to La Guardia. His law clerks assure the crowd that he will help one and all, regardless of their ability to pay ("On the Side of the Angels"). Fiorello's secretary Marie and her friend Dora discuss a crisis. Thea Almerigatti, the leader of the women shirtwaist strikers, has been arrested. La Guardia promises to help the strikers. As the district leader Ben and his political buddies play poker ("Politics and Poker"), Marie introduces La Guardia as a potential Congressional candidate. They want to beat the corrupt machine of Tammany Hall.

While helping the women strikers ("Unfair"), Fiorello asks Marie to dinner, but Thea, newly released from prison, arrives. She asks Fiorello to dinner to plan strategy, and he breaks his date with Marie. Marie feels foolish for caring while he cares so little ("Marie's Law").

Next year, Fiorello is campaigning for Congress, and Thea introduces him. Fiorello promises to break the stranglehold of Tammany Hall ("The Name's La Guardia!"). La Guardia wins the election ("The Bum Won"). In another year, La Guardia enlists in the Air Force and proposes to Thea. He and Marie say their farewells as he is about to leave for the war ("Till Tomorrow"). La Guardia's participation in the war is presented as a series of montages, staged and on film. With the war over, Fiorello returns home ("Home Again"), with both Marie and Thea waiting for him. He goes to Thea, who has agreed to marriage. Morris, the office manager, comforts Marie.

=== Act II ===
In 1929, La Guardia runs for mayor of New York, after he and Thea are married. Thea, home from a visit to the doctor, exclaims her love ("When Did I Fall In Love"). At Dora and her husband Floyd's (who has retired from the police force) home, the corrupt backers of Jimmy Walker, Fiorello's competitor for mayor, meet. As one of the gang wants to have Fiorello killed at his public speech, Dora rushes to secretly warn Marie. However, Fiorello's campaign is in turmoil, with Ben being fired and his worry over Thea's deteriorating health. At La Guardia's speech the gang's plan to kill him is foiled. But Thea dies, and Marie, Morris, and Neil have to tell Fiorello. The race for mayor is won by Jimmy Walker. Fiorello is inspired by tragedy to continue his campaign.

In 1933, Ben and his political friends are again playing poker ("Little Tin Box"). Marie arrives and announces that she is quitting her job and will marry "The Very Next Man" who asks her. She convinces Ben to return to Fiorello to help him win the upcoming mayoral election. She then helps Fiorello to overcome his fears of losing and run again. He runs with Ben's help, and also asks Marie to marry him. She accepts and Fiorello finally becomes the mayor.

== Background and analysis ==
The musical contains several songs built around a group of machine politicians. In "Politics and Poker", Republican machine politicians try to pick a congressional candidate in a district they consider hopeless, while playing a game of poker, and compare politics to poker. The lyric is set to waltz tempo "to underscore the frivolity of their cynicism." In "The Bum Won", these same politicians commiserate with one another after La Guardia has won the election without their support. In "Little Tin Box", they imagine a series of Tammany politicians attempting to explain to a judge that their wealth came from their scrupulous habits of saving ("I can see Your Honor doesn't pull his punches/ And it looks a trifle fishy, I'll admit,/ But for one whole week I went without my lunches/ And it mounted up, Your Honor, bit by bit./ Up Your Honor, bit by bit.")

In "I Love a Cop", a woman factory worker describes her hapless situation of having fallen in love with a policeman who was called out against a strike by her union; "The Name's La Guardia" has La Guardia campaigning in English, Italian and Yiddish. There is also a ragtime number, "Gentleman Jimmy" about bon vivant mayor James J. "Jimmy" Walker, and the comic "Marie's Law", in which Marie proposes a "law" about how husbands should treat their wives. ("Every girl shall have a honeymoon, which will last at least a year,/ During which aforesaid honeymoon, every care shall disappear…".)

Besides the invention of some peripheral characters, the musical changes some basic facts of La Guardia's life. La Guardia's first wife, Thea, died after only three years of marriage, but the fictional Thea lives another eight years, so that her death can be one more calamity during La Guardia's unsuccessful 1929 mayoral campaign; also, the script downplays La Guardia's generally successful congressional career to make him seem more of an outsider and increase the triumph of his eventual mayoral victory in 1933.

== Songs ==
Act I

- "On the Side of the Angels" – Neil, Morris, and Dora
- "Politics and Poker" – Ben, Politicians
- "Unfair" – Fiorello, Dora, and Girls
- "Marie's Law" – Marie and Morris
- "The Name's La Guardia" – Fiorello and Company
- "The Bum Won" – Ben, Politicians
- "I Love a Cop" – Dora
- "I Love a Cop" (reprise) – Dora and Floyd
- "Till Tomorrow" – Thea and Company
- "Home Again" – Company

Act II

- "When Did I Fall in Love" – Thea
- "Gentleman Jimmy" – Mitzi and Dancing Girls
- "Gentleman Jimmy" (reprise) – Company
- "Little Tin Box" – Ben, Politicians
- "The Very Next Man" – Marie
- "The Very Next Man" (reprise) – Marie
- "Finale" – Company

An additional song, "Where Do I Go from Here?" (originally written for Marie to sing in Act I) was cut out of town; a fully orchestrated recording, sung by Broadway actress Liz Callaway, can be heard on the anthology album Lost in Boston I (Varèse Sarabande VSD-5475). "Till Tomorrow" and "Unfair" were written "on spec" before Bock and Harnick were hired for the show. "Little Tin Box" was added on the road in Philadelphia.

== Casts (1950s-1980s) ==
Character	Original Broadway Production	US National Tour	Paper Mill Playhouse Production	City Center Revival	Music Fair Circuit Production	Original West End Production	Equity Library Theatre Revival	Paper Mill Playhouse Production	Music Fair Circuit Production	Goodspeed Musicals Production	Equity Library Theatre Revival
Character	1959-1961	1960-1962	1962				1976	1979	1985		1988
Fiorello La Guardia	Tom Bosley	Bob Carroll	Tom Bosley	Sorrell Booke	Tom Bosley	Derek Smith	Frank Kopyc	William Linton	Tom Bosley	Jack Hallett	Joe Dispenza
Thea	Ellen Hanley	Jen Nelson	?	Lola Fisher	Melisande Congdon	Marion Grimaldi	Verna Pierce	Laura McDuffie	Maris Clement	Lynne Wintersteller	Jane Wasser
Dora	Pat Stanley	Zeme North	?	Dody Goodman	Barbara Sharma	Bridget Armstrong	Alexandra Korey	Alexandra Korey	Patricia Carr	Kiel Junius	Felicia Farone
Marie	Patricia Wilson	Charlotte Fairchild	?	Barbara Williams	Patricia Wilson	Nicolette Roeg	Ann Hodapp	Paige O'Hara	Rosalind Harris	Randy Graff	Mia Randall
Ben Marino	Howard da Silva	Rudy Bond	?	Art Lund	H. F. Green	Peter Reeves	Christopher Wynkoop	Lew Resseguie	Joe Silver	Raymond Thorne	Paul Laureano
Morris	Nathaniel Frey	Henry Lascoe	?	Paul Lipson	Jack Hollander	David Lander	Michael McCarty	Taylor Reed	Paul Keith	Tom Robbins	Mark Goldbaum
Neil	Bob Holiday	Arthur Bartow	?	Richard France	Arthur Bartow	Peter Bourne	Bill Biskup	Kevin Daly	Gregg Edelman	Todd Thurston	?
Mitzi Travers	Eileen Rodgers	Rosemary O'Reilly	?	Sheila Smith	Barbara James	Pat Michael	Debbi Morell	Suzanne Dawson	Isabelle Farrell	Laura Kenyon	Kathryn Kendall
Mrs. Pomerantz	Helen Verbit	Lucille Blackton	?	Helen Verbit	Helene Andreu	Helen Hurst	Annie Korzen	Rebecca Hoodwin	?	Susan Rosenstock	?
Floyd	Mark Dawson	Clint Young	?	Dort Clark	Alan North	Simon Oates	Frank Luz	Dick Sabol	Gary Lahti	George Kmeck	?

=== Notable Replacements ===
==== Original Broadway Production (1959–1961) ====
- Fiorello La Guardia: Harvey Lembeck (s/b), Sorrell Booke (s/b)
- Dora: Patricia Harty
- Marie: Eileen Rodgers (u/s)
- Ben Marino: Russ Brown
- Neil: Ron Husmann (u/s)
- Mitzi Travers: Joy Nichols

==== US National Tour (1960–1962) ====
- Morris: Paul Lipson
- Floyd: Alan North

== Casts (1990s-2020s) ==
Character	Pittsburgh Civic Light Opera Production	Encores! Production	Reprise Theatre Company Production	Encores! Production
Character	1993	1994	1999	2013
Fiorello La Guardia	Jack Hallett	Jerry Zaks	Tony Danza	Danny Rutigliano
Thea	Lynne Wintersteller	Elizabeth Futral	Jennifer Westfeldt	Kate Baldwin
Dora	Vicki Lewis	Liz Callaway	Suzanne Blakeslee	Jennifer Gambatese
Marie	Judy Blazer	Faith Prince	Amy Pietz	Erin Dilly
Ben Marino	Michael Mulheren	Philip Bosco	Lenny Wolpe	Shuler Hensley
Morris	Tim Jerome	Adam Arkin	Ron Orbach	Adam Heller
Neil	John Hoshko	Gregg Edelman	Brian Stepanek	Andrew Samonsky
Mitzi Travers	Lenora Nemetz	Donna McKechnie	Pamela Blair	Emily Skinner
Mrs. Pomerantz	Peggy Greenberg	Marilyn Cooper	?	Cheryl Stern
Floyd	John Sloman	James Judy	Mike Hagerty	Jeremy Bobb

== Critical response ==
In his review for The New York Times, Brooks Atkinson wrote: "... It is exciting; it is enjoyable and it is decent ... Jerry Bock has set ... a bouncy score ... [A]s the writer of lyrics, Sheldon Harnick is in an unfailingly humorous frame of mind ... [U]nder Mr. Abbott's invincible stage direction, the whole show comes alive with gusto ... [T]he cast could not be more winning or in better voice."

Louis Calta wrote: "'Fiorello!' is the town's latest stage hit ... the attraction earned flowery praise from all of the New York drama critics."

== Original cast album ==
The original cast recording of Fiorello! was made by Capitol Records on November 29, 1959, just six days after the show opened, and was released on December 14. The album debuted on Billboard's best-selling albums chart January 11, 1960, peaked at No. 7 and remained on the charts for 89 weeks. It has been reissued on CD twice, first by Capitol and then later in a much improved release on EMI's Broadway Angel label (CD #ZDM 7 65023-2).

== In popular culture ==
On the television show Mad Men, Don Draper and his wife Betty attend a performance of Fiorello! in the season one episode Shoot.

== See also ==
- Jimmy (musical), about New York City Mayor Jimmy Walker
- Mayor (musical), about New York City Mayor Ed Koch

== Awards and nominations ==
=== Original Broadway production ===
Year	Award	Category	Nominee	Result
1960	Tony Award	Best Musical		Won
1960	Tony Award	Best Performance by a Featured Actor in a Musical	Tom Bosley	Won
1960	Tony Award	Best Performance by a Featured Actor in a Musical	Howard Da Silva	Nominated
1960	Tony Award	Best Direction of a Musical	George Abbott	Won
1960	Tony Award	Best Choreography	Peter Gennaro	Nominated
1960	Tony Award	Best Conductor and Musical Director	Hal Hastings	Nominated
1960	Tony Award	Best Scenic Design	William and Jean Eckart	Nominated
1960	Pulitzer Prize for Drama			Won
1960	New York Drama Critics' Circle Awards	Best Musical	Jerry Bock, Sheldon Harnick, George Abbott and Jerome Weidman	Won
