= Thomas Morrow =

Thomas Morrow may refer to:

- Thomas Morrow (Australian politician) (1888–1971), member of the New South Wales General Assembly 1922–1925
- Thomas Z. Morrow (1835–1913), legislator and circuit court judge from Kentucky
- Tom Morrow (American football) (1938–2018), American football player
- Tom Morrow (footballer) (1923–2002), Australian rules footballer
- Tom Morrow (artist) (1928–1994), American commercial artist and theatre poster designer
- Thomas Morrow, a character on the television series NCIS
- Tom Morrow, the fictitious, eponymous host of the Disney attraction Innoventions

== See also ==
- Thomas Morrow Reavley (1921-2020), United States judge
- Morrow (surname)
