= Michael Zaslow =

American actor (1942–1998)

- Zaslow in Law & Order, 1994
- Born: Michael Joel Zaslow; November 1, 1942; Inglewood, California
- Died: December 6, 1998 (aged 56); New York, New York
- Years active: 1961–1998
- Spouses: Joanne Dorian (m. 1965; div. 1972) Susan Hufford (m. 1975)
- Children: 2

Michael Joel Zaslow (November 1, 1942 – December 6, 1998) was an American actor. He was best known for his role as villain Roger Thorpe on CBS's Guiding Light, a role he played from 1971 to 1980 and again from 1989 to 1997, earning multiple nominations – and one win – at the Daytime Emmy Awards.

He also appeared as a guest in two episodes of Star Trek: The Original Series, notably in the series' inaugural episode in which his character, the Enterprise crewman Darnell, is the first character in Star Trek history to be killed off.

== Life and career ==
Zaslow was born in Inglewood, California. He played Dick Hart on the CBS soap opera Search for Tomorrow and Dr. Peter Chernak on Love Is a Many Splendored Thing. He also played David Renaldi on ABC's One Life to Live from 1983 to 1986.

Zaslow guest-starred on a number of other television shows and soap operas, including Barnaby Jones, The Love Boat, and Law & Order. In the episode "The Man Trap," the series' September 8, 1966 premiere of Star Trek, he played Crewman Darnell, the first Starship Enterprise crew member to be killed off. The incident sparked the first diagnosis of the now-famous line: "He's dead, Jim," by Enterprise crew-member Dr. Leonard McCoy (DeForest Kelley). He also appeared as Jordan in the episode "I, Mudd". He costarred in the 1977 feature film You Light Up My Life, and appeared in the 1979 sci-fi movie Meteor.

Zaslow's Broadway theatre credits included Fiddler on the Roof, Cat on a Hot Tin Roof, and Onward Victoria.

Zaslow was also the godfather of actor Christian Slater.

However, it was for his work as Roger Thorpe on Guiding Light that Zaslow was always best known. One of the show's central villains of the 1970s, his first onscreen "death" was voted the top scene in the show's history when the series celebrated its 50th anniversary. In the late 1980s, he returned to the show and, once again, became a central figure. Zaslow received multiple Daytime Emmy nominations (and won once) for his work in the role, and continually appeared on both critics' and fans' lists of favorite soap opera performers.

=== Illness and death ===
In 1997, he began to experience difficulty speaking. When it became noticeable on screen, he was placed on leave at Guiding Light. (There are conflicting stories as to whether Zaslow was then fired; there was for some time a legal action against Guiding Light and sponsor Procter & Gamble, which was eventually settled.) It was some time before Zaslow was diagnosed with amyotrophic lateral sclerosis (ALS), or Lou Gehrig's disease (it was first thought he had suffered a stroke). Zaslow did not return to Guiding Light, and his role was briefly recast before being written off. (In 2004, Zaslow's character on Guiding Light died off-screen.)

Zaslow was hired at One Life to Live in 1998 to play David Renaldi again, appearing first in May of that year, his condition being written into the storyline. He made numerous appearances over the next seven months before he was too ill to continue working.

Zaslow died from a heart attack on December 6, 1998, at his New York City home. He was survived by his wife, psychologist/writer Susan Hufford; and two daughters, Helena and Marika.

His final appearance on One Life to Live was televised December 1. The character of David Renaldi was soon referred to as living off-screen, and mentions of him eventually dropped.

== Legacy ==
Hufford founded ZazAngels, a foundation that seeks to raise funds in order to find a cure for Lou Gehrig's disease. Several of Zaslow's Guiding Light and One Life to Live castmates, along with many Broadway-based theater luminaries, have participated in tributes that were fundraisers for ZazAngels. Hufford released a book about Zaslow and his fight with ALS, titled Not That Man Anymore. Zaslow had begun writing the book several years earlier.

Helena Zaslow died on December 28, 2004, in Connecticut at age 19, only days after completing her first semester at Wellesley College.

Hufford died from cancer on November 28, 2006.

== Selected filmography ==
Year	Title	Role	Notes
1961	Breakfast at Tiffany's	Party Guest	Uncredited
1970	Love Is a Many Splendored Thing	Dr. Peter 'Pete' Chernak	328 episodes
1966-1967	Star Trek: The Original Series	Darnell / Jordan	S1E1, "The Man Trap", S2E8, "I, Mudd"
1977	You Light Up My Life	Chris Nolan	
1979	Meteor	Sam Mason	
1985	Seven Minutes in Heaven	Natalie's Father	
1983-1987	One Life to Live	David Renaldi	18 episodes
1971-1997	Guiding Light	Roger Thorpe	1,800-2,200 episodes
