= Susan Hufford =

American actress, psychotherapist (1938–2006)

Susan Hufford (December 15, 1938, in Lebanon, Ohio – November 28, 2006), was an actress, psychotherapist, and author.

As a member of the ALS Association's national board of trustees and the Greater New York Chapter's board of directors, she was an advocate to raise awareness about ALS and became a major fundraiser for ALS research. She helped raise more than $1 million to find a cure for the disease.

Hufford authored more than 20 books and also was a practicing psychotherapist with a private clinical practice in Manhattan, New York. Before making a career change, she was an actress in regional theater in addition to her Broadway career.

Hufford was married to actor Michael Zaslow, whom she met when they both were in the Broadway production of Fiddler on the Roof in the early 1970s. The couple married on June 7, 1975, and were married for 23 years. They had two daughters, Marika and Helena. Zaslow died on December 6, 1998. Their daughter, Helena Hufford-Zaslow, died on December 28, 2004, in Connecticut at age 19, only days after completing her first semester at Wellesley College. In 2005, Hufford released an account about Zaslow and his fight with ALS, titled Not That Man Anymore, a book Zaslow himself had begun writing prior to his death.

Hufford died from cancer on November 28, 2006.

== Books ==
- Miracles (1989)
- Reflections (1981)
- Midnight Sailing (1975)
- Trail Of Innocence (1978)
- Satan's Sunset (1977)
- The Devil's Sonata (1976)
- Skin Deep (1978)
- Melody of Malice (1979)
- Not That Man Anymore: (A Message From Michael) (2005)
- How to Create Your Own Luck: The You Never Know Approach to Networking, Taking Chances, and Opening Yourself to Opportunity (2004)
- A Delicate Deceit (1976)
- The Devil's Sonata (1976)
- Going All the Way (1980)
