= Paul Lipson =

American actor (1913–1996)

- Born: December 23, 1913; Brooklyn, New York
- Died: January 3, 1996 (aged 82); New York City

Paul R. Lipson (December 23, 1913 – January 3, 1996) was an American stage actor.

== Early life ==
Lipson was born in Brooklyn, New York, the son of Abraham Lipson and Elizabeth Richtol, and grew up in Pittsfield, Massachusetts. He attended The Ohio State University and served in the Air Force during World War II.

== Stage career ==
After his military service, Lipson performed in touring productions, including Dangerous Woman, with ZaSu Pitts and Joan of Lorraine with Diana Barrymore.

At the time of his death, he had played the role of Tevye in Fiddler on the Roof in more performances than any other actor, clocking over 2,000 performances as Zero Mostel's Broadway understudy, and later performing the lead role in his own right. Because he had appeared for some time in a Las Vegas production that played 12 performances a week instead of the eight on Broadway, by the time Fiddler became the longest-running show in 1972, he had appeared in more performances than had played on Broadway. Initially, in the 1964 production of the play, Lipson portrayed bookseller Avram.

Lipson was on Broadway in "Detective Story," "Remains to Be Seen," "Carnival in Flanders," "I've Got Sixpence," "The Vamp", Fiorello!, and "Bells Are Ringing".

His stage career spanned five decades, from his debut in 1942 in the play Lily of the Valley (credited as "Paul R. Lipson"), through the 1980s. He also made guest appearances on several television shows in the 1950s and 1960s.

== Death ==
Lipson died in New York City on January 3, 1996, aged 82.
