= Tom Morrow (artist) =

American artist

Tom Morrow (1928–1994) was an American painter and commercial artist, best known as the designer of numerous iconic advertisements for Broadway plays and musicals from the 1950s to the 1980s. In 1975, Morrow was credited with "having the distinction of creating artwork for more Broadway musicals and plays than any other living artist".

== Career ==
The purpose of the art I create is not to be ponderous, but rather to heighten and light up its surroundings. I want it to be fun to look at, I wish people to care about the painting and use it as something to make them feel good.

— Tom Morrow, 1975.

Morrow was a graduate of the Parsons School of Design in Greenwich Village, New York City. He began his career as a book illustrator; his best known work in that field was the 1961 children's book Time for Bed, by Inez Bertail. By the mid-1950s, Morrow had already turned to the design of Broadway theatre advertisements. Early examples, such as his posters for the play Auntie Mame (1955) and the musical Candide (1956), already displayed the lively, colourful and almost expressionist style that would characterise his work for the next three decades. He devised many particularly memorable images that become well known through their use on posters, Playbills, sheet music and on the record sleeves of original cast albums. These included stylised depictions of Gwen Verdon (in her 1959 show, Redhead), Tammy Grimes (The Unsinkable Molly Brown, 1960) and Lucille Ball (Wildcat, 1960). His sexy logo for the 1958 musical Oh, Captain!, depicting a young woman wearing only an apron and a captain's hat, has been credited with increasing the advance ticket sales for what otherwise proved to be a mediocre and short-lived show. Morrow's subsequent association with producer/director Harold Prince saw him design some of the most memorable Broadway logos of the 1960s, including the Cupid motif from She Loves Me (1963), the Chagall-influenced peasant village scene from Fiddler on the Roof (1964), the crowded nightclub from Cabaret (1966) and the handstand male figure from Zorba (1968). Morrow also produced the series of paintings that was used in the title sequence of Prince's 1970 feature film, Something for Everyone.

By the early 1970s, Morrow had also become well known as a painter. He exhibited exclusively at the Zachary Waller Gallery in Los Angeles, whose proprietor, John Waller, once described him thus:

Tom Morrow is an artist's artist. His paintings have the look of spontaneity and at the same time embody color sense with unusual composition which is admired by his fellow artists, who know how difficult it is to master a technique that has those attributes. His works also appeal to a rather sophisticated audience, people who frequent fine galleries, museums and the theater; people who travel and are leaders in various professions. These people have an inherent response to visual artistry and respond to the joyous and exuberant finished work by the artist.

Morrow's paintings could be found in the private collections of many of his colleagues in the performing arts, including not only Harold Prince but also composer/lyricist Stephen Sondheim, writer/director Arthur Laurents, choreographer Jerome Robbins, composer/musical director Saul Chaplin, fashion designer Bill Blass and actors Angela Lansbury, Joel Grey, Farley Granger, Ron Rifkin and Peggy Cass.

Morrow also pursued other business interests in the field of design. He was involved with Leoda de Mar Wallpapers, Inc, and was a founding partner of the textile design firm of Hannett Morrow Fischer, Inc. During the 1970s and '80s, Morrow worked only sporadically as a designer of theatre advertisements. His final poster design, for the stage musical Grind (1985), fittingly representing a reunion with producer Harold Prince. In 1988, Morrow was invited to contribute to A Quilt for the American Theater, which was assembled to raise funds for the charity Broadway Cares. He provided a 24-inch fabric square based on his logo for Fiddler on the Roof, depicting actor Zero Mostel as Tevye. The finished quilt was shown in the foyer of the Marriott Marquis Hotel prior to being raffled on Valentine's Day, 1989.

Morrow died on February 11, 1994, after suffering a heart attack at his home in Manhattan.

== Legacy ==
Although Morrow's lively artistic style had become somewhat unfashionable by the 1990s, his classic images from earlier Broadway shows were introduced to a new audience through CD re-issues of original cast albums that had featured his artwork. Awareness of, and interest, in Morrow's theatre artwork has burgeoned in more recent years. His work was the subject of a one-man exhibition, held at the gallery of the York Theatre in 1999. More recently, his posters were shown alongside those of many other artists as part of an exhibition titled The Ballyhoo of Broadway, which was mounted at Grand Central Station in September 2004 to celebrated New York City's inaugural Advertising Week. Recent appreciations of Morrow's work can also be found in publications, notably Steven Suskin's A Must See!: Brilliant Broadway Artwork (2004). In February 2005, an auction of vintage posters in New York City saw original issues of the Morrow-designed posters for Cabaret and Fiddler on the Roof sold, respectively, for $575 and $1,475.

== Notable works ==
=== Broadway ===
Morrow designed the logo artwork for the following Broadway stage productions:

- Auntie Mame (1955 play)
- Candide (1956 musical)
- Oh, Captain! (1958 musical)
- Whoop-Up (1958 musical)
- The Pink Jungle (1959 pre-Broadway musical)
- The Unsinkable Molly Brown (1960 musical)
- Take Her, She's Mine (1961 play)
- Wildcat (1961 musical)
- Subways Are For Sleeping (1961 musical)
- She Loves Me (1963 musical)
- Fiddler on the Roof (1964 musical)
- The Amorous Flea (1964 musical)
- Anya (1965 musical)
- Skyscraper (1965 musical)
- Cabaret (1966 musical)
- The Deer Park (1967 play)
- Zorba (1968 musical)
- Loot (1968 play)
- George M! (1968 musical)
- Promenade (1969 musical)
- Lovely Ladies, Kind Gentlemen (1970 musical)
- Show Me Where the Good Times Are (1970 musical)
- Lorelei (1974 musical)
- So Long, 174th Street (1976 musical)
- Grind (1985 musical)

=== Other ===
- Something for Everyone (1970 film) - storyboard paintings used in title sequence
- Frank Sinatra: Live at Madison Square Garden (1974) - poster design
- A Quilt for the American Theater (1989) - contributed one panel
