= Green Violinist =

Painting by Marc Chagall

- Artist: Marc Chagall
- Year: 1923–24
- Medium: Oil on canvas
- Dimensions: 197.5 cm × 108.6 cm (77.8 in × 42.8 in)
- Location: Solomon R. Guggenheim Museum, New York

Green Violinist is a 1923–24 painting by artist Marc Chagall that is now in the permanent collection of the Solomon R. Guggenheim Museum in New York City. The work depicts a fiddler as the central figure who appears to be floating or dancing above the much smaller rooftops of the misty gray village below. This work is often considered to be the inspiration for the title of the 1964 musical Fiddler on the Roof.

== Background ==
Green Violinist was completed following Chagall's return to Paris after a long visit to his homeland of Russia. This particular version is a later re-working of an earlier version painted during Chagall's second Russian period. This version was most likely completed while the 1920 original was being shown in Paris. This work presents subject matter that is nearly identical to its 1920 predecessor, Music, which was one of seven paintings created on a commission from the Moscow State Jewish Theatre. The direct connection between Green Violinist and its earlier counterpart was made explicitly during the artist's lifetime at his retrospective at Museum of Modern Art.

In 1917, during his Second Russian Period, Chagall began accepting commissions to work on theater sets and costume design. In 1919, Chagall was commissioned to create a setting for the premier production of Alexis Granowsky's Moscow State Jewish Theatre. Susan Compton provides an excellent description of the physical layout of Chagall's work in the theater: "When he was done, his paintings – in tempera and gouache on canvas – decorated tall the walls and even the ceiling of the theater: four vertical panels between the windows on one side, on the themes of Music, Dance, Drama, and Literature […] and a narrow frieze depicting a wedding feast […] above them; one long composition, Introduction to the Jewish Theater […], on the windowless wall opposite; a single panel, Love on the Stage […], between the two entrance doors at the back of the theater; the stage curtain; and the ceiling painting, which depicted flying lovers[.]" Through the subject matter of the painting Introduction to the Jewish Theater, Chagall inserts himself as an important and defining voice for the new direction of Jewish Theater. There is extensive evidence of the profound affect Chagall's artistic style had on manner of acting that was adopted for the first production of the company, a collection of short plays written by Sholem Aleichem.

== Details ==
Similar painting by Chagall, The Fiddler, 1912–1913

The style of this work reflects the avant-garde styles that were common in Paris after Chagall relocated there in 1910, but the subject matter is highly indicative of his Hasidic roots in Russia. This is made particularly evident by the central figure of the fiddler, who was a "vital presence in ceremonies and festivals" due to the Hasidic belief in achieving "communion with God through music and dance". This specific work, a re-working of a previous painting, demonstrates a degree of nostalgia for his own work. L. L. Zimmerman writes of Chagall's stylistic influence on the theatrical space his works occupied: "His paintings and theatrical designs, with their complete disregard for the traditional mathematics of space and time, stand out uniquely among the other products of modern artistic and theatrical endeavor." Art historians speculate that “The Green Violinist” may hold personal significance for Chagall, representing for a lost love or a longing for spiritual fulfillment.

== Connection to Fiddler on the Roof ==
The connection between this painting and the 1964 Broadway musical, Fiddler on the Roof, is often interpreted in very different ways by various theater companies, art historians, and scholars. The musical takes its source material from The Tevye Stories by Sholem Aleichem. Evidence for the connection between Chagall's painting and the title of the musical can be found by placing the work within the context of the Russian Revolution, as it "asserts the priority of a specific ethnic culture against the hegemony of Russian society, from which the artist had been institutionally excluded since youth." There is also evidence that Chagall often showcased the people of the shtetl, who are at the heart of Sholem Aleichem's stories and, consequently Fiddler on the Roof, in a very sympathetic light. In addition to the ideological similarities between Sholem Aleichem and Chagall's works, the case for a connection between the painting and the musical is strengthened by the fact that the 1964 production of the musical was designed by Boris Aronson, who also wrote one of the earliest monographs on Chagall.

== See also ==
- List of artworks by Marc Chagall
