= Rosalind Harris =

American theater and film actress (born 1946)

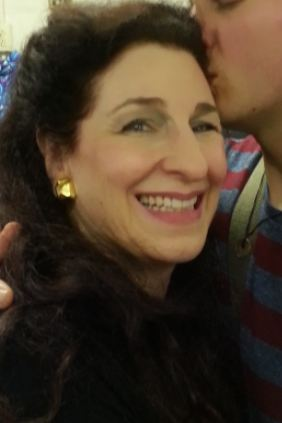
- Born: December 22, 1946 (age 79); White Plains, New York
- Occupation: Actress

Rosalind Harris (born December 22, 1946) is an American theater and film actress. She is best known for her portrayal of Tzeitel, the eldest daughter of Tevye, in the 1971 film version of Fiddler on the Roof. She also starred as Tzeitel in the Broadway musical, having replaced Bette Midler. Nearly 20 years after the film, Harris played mother Golde in a touring stage revival of Fiddler on the Roof; Topol, the Israeli actor who played her father Tevye in the film, reprised his role, now playing her husband.

Harris also performed in roles Off Broadway, regional theater and summer stock. Her credits include: Elsie in Horatio (Arena Stage), Jenny Hill in Major Barbara (American Shakespeare Festival), Aldonza in Man of La Mancha, Mama Rose in Gypsy, Leona Samish in Do I Hear a Waltz? (Equity Library Theatre), 10 productions of Funny Girl, as Fanny Brice (Chateau DeVille Dinner Theatre) and as Dora in The Rise of David Levinsky (American Jewish Theatre). Harris has made television commercials as well, and her spot as a female doctor in a Mogen David Wine commercial won a Clio Award. In 1993, she was nominated for a MAC Award for her work in the cabaret show, Hollywood Opera, at Don't Tell Mama, in New York City, written by and also starring Barry Keating.

She appeared as Fanny Brice in the 1984 film The Cotton Club, and as Mrs. Lowenstein in the Hallmark Hall of Fame made-for-television movie Mrs. Santa Claus. Harris created her own vintage and estate jewelry business, “Rosalind’s – As You Liked It”. In 2012, Harris starred in the musical MisSpelled at the Cherry Lane Theatre. It was performed at Town Hall in New York City as part of the 50th Anniversary Gala of Fiddler on the Roof with Sheldon Harnick, Chita Rivera, and Chaim Topol. In 2016, Harris sang at the Museum of Jewish Heritage in New York along with other cast members in another Fiddler tribute.
