= Norma Crane =

American stage, film and television actress (1928–1973)

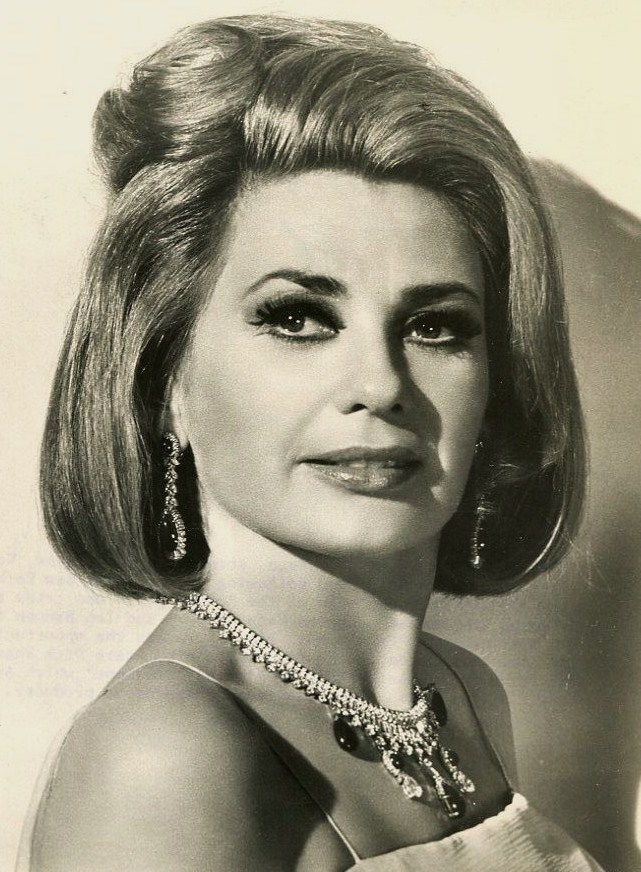
- Crane in 1966
- Born: Norma Anna Bella Zuckerman; November 10, 1928; New York City, New York, U.S.
- Died: September 28, 1973 (aged 44); Los Angeles, California, U.S.
- Resting place: Westwood Village Memorial Park Cemetery, Los Angeles
- Occupation: Actress
- Years active: 1951–1973
- Spouse(s): Herb Sargent (m. 1961; div. 19??)

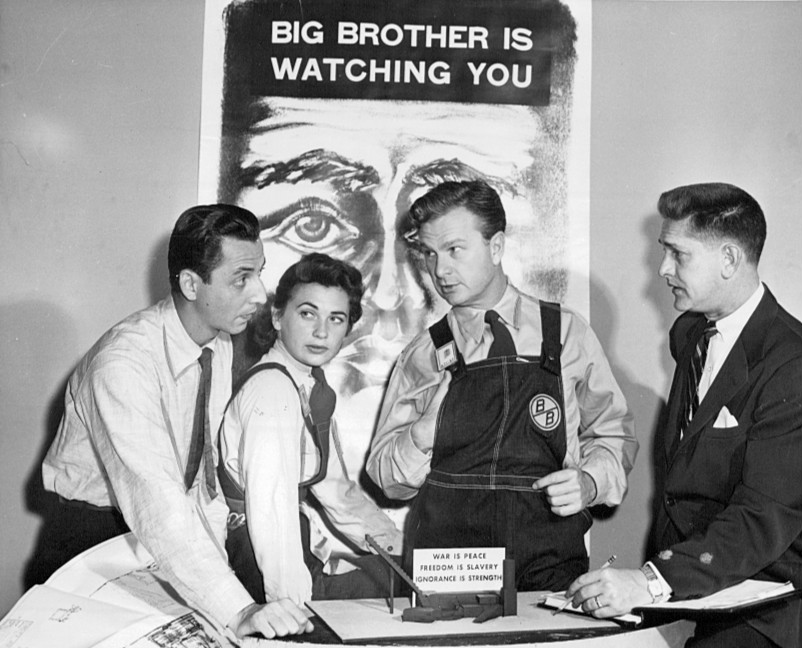
On the set of the CBS anthology TV series Studio One's presentation of George Orwell's "1984". L-R: scenic designer Kim Swados, Norma Crane, Eddie Albert, and director Paul Nickell

Norma Crane (born Norma Anna Bella Zuckerman; November 10, 1928 — September 28, 1973) was an American actress of stage, film, and television best known for her role as Golde in the 1971 film adaptation of Fiddler on the Roof, a role which earned her a nomination for a Photoplay Award. She also starred in They Call Me Mister Tibbs! and Penelope. Crane was born in New York City, but raised in El Paso, Texas.

== Early years ==
Crane was born Norma Anna Bella Zuckerman to a Jewish family in New York City and raised in El Paso. When she was 12 years old, she moved there to live with her father, Sam Zuckerman. She was named for three aunts, all of whom died in gas chambers during the Holocaust. She grew up learning about Eastern Europe's Jews and their heritage.

Crane graduated from Austin High School in 1946 and studied drama at Texas State College for Women in Denton, and was a member of Elia Kazan's Actors Studio.

== Career ==
Crane made her debut on Broadway in Arthur Miller's play The Crucible.

Throughout the 1950s, she appeared on a variety of live television dramas, first gaining recognition in a televised adaptation of George Orwell's 1984. She played Ellie Martin in Vincente Minnelli's film version of Tea and Sympathy. She appeared in the 1956 Alfred Hitchcock Presents episode "There Was an Old Woman," the 1958 episode "The Equalizer," and the 1959 episode “Appointment at Eleven”. Also in 1959, she portrayed “Tilda” on the TV Western Gunsmoke.

She guest-starred four times on the CBS western television series Have Gun – Will Travel with Richard Boone. She appeared on an episode of ABC's The Untouchables as Lily Dallas, a ruthless gang leader, and she appeared in two other episodes.

In 1960, Crane appeared as Sarah Prentice in the episode "River Champion" of the NBC Western series Riverboat starring Darren McGavin. A few weeks later, Crane was cast as Sarah in the episode "Deadly Tomorrow" of the ABC adventure series The Islanders, set in the South Pacific.

In 1961, Crane guest-starred in the title role in the episode "The Return of Widow Brown" of the NBC Western The Deputy. Later that year she re-appeared on Gunsmoke in an episode entitled "Perce", as well as in an episode of The Asphalt Jungle. In 1965, Crane guest-starred as Mrs. Mavis Hull in The Fugitive episode "Masquerade" and a 1968 episode of The Flying Nun.

Several years after Crane passed age 30, she stopped receiving offers for acting jobs. At that point, she commented, "I said: Who needs it? I quit." She turned her hobby of decorating into a business and became a licensed interior decorator. She accepted occasional acting opportunities when she was between houses, but when she took on a house as a project, her approach was described as "a total commitment to the project in every detail, cellar to roof."

== Personal life and death ==
In 1961, Crane married writer-producer Herb Sargent; the marriage ended in divorce. She died of breast cancer on September 28, 1973, at age 44 in Los Angeles, California, two years after the release of Fiddler on the Roof (1971), her last film.

== Partial filmography ==
Year	Title	Role	Notes
1956	Alfred Hitchcock Presents	Lorna Bramwell	Season 1 Episode 25: "There Was an Old Woman"
1956	Tea and Sympathy	Ellie Martin	
1958	Have Gun – Will Travel	Ella West	Season 1 Episode 17: "Ella West"
1958	Have Gun - Will Travel	Lucy Kellaway	Season 2 Episode 17: "The Taffeta Mayor"
1958	Alfred Hitchcock Presents	Louise Marsh	Season 3 Episode 19: "The Equalizer"
1959	Have Gun – Will Travel	Mrs. Smith - Wife	Season 3 Episode 2: "Episode in Laredo"
1959	Alfred Hitchcock Presents	Blonde Lady in Bar	Season 5 Episode 3: "Appointment at Eleven"
1961	All in a Night's Work	Marge Coombs	
1961	Have Gun – Will Travel	Martha Jane Conroy aka Calamity Jane	Season 4 Episode 35: "The Cure"
1961	Thriller	Nell Le Jean	Season 2 Episode 11: "Dialogues with Death" (segment "Welcome Home")
1963	Look Up and Live	Janet	Episode: "The Presence of Death"
1965	The Fugitive	Mrs. Mavis Hull	Season 2 Episode 26: "Masquerade"
1966	Penelope	Mildred	
1966	The Big Valley	Emilie	Season 2 Episode 12: "Last Stage To Salt Flats"
1967	Judd for the Defense	Mrs. Ferguson	Season 1 Episode 9: "Citizen Ritter"
1967	The Man from U.N.C.L.E.	Heather Klump	Season 3 Episode 24: "The Matterhorn Affair"
1968	The Sweet Ride	Mrs. Cartwright	
1969	Ironside	Linda Brady	Season 3 Episode 10: "Five Miles High"
1969	Night Gallery	Gretchen	Pilot episode, segment "Escape Route"
1970	They Call Me Mister Tibbs!	Marge Garfield	
1970	The Movie Murderer	Ellen Farrington	TV Movie
1970	Adam-12	Mae Pilaf	Season 2 Episode 15: "Log 64: Bottom of the Bottle"
1970	The Name of the Game	Lorraine Dancy	Season 2 Episode 20: "The King of Denmark"
1971	Fiddler on the Roof	Golde	
1972	Owen Marshall, Counselor at Law	Marie Giannetta	Season 2 Episode 5: "Journey Through Limbo"
1972	Banyon	Marge Douglas	Season 1 Episode 9: "Think of me Kindly"
1973	The Doris Day Show	Donna Bennett	Season 5 Episode 20: "A Small Cure for Big Alimony"
