= Fiddler on the Roof =

1964 musical

- Playbill from the original Broadway production
- Music: Jerry Bock
- Lyrics: Sheldon Harnick
- Book: Joseph Stein
- Basis: Tevye the Dairyman by Sholem Aleichem
- Productions: 1964 Broadway; 1967 West End; 1976 Broadway revival; 1981 Broadway revival; 1983 West End revival; 1990 Broadway revival; 1994 West End revival; 2003 UK tour; 2004 Broadway revival; 2007 West End revival; 2008 UK tour; 2009 US tour; 2015 Broadway revival; 2018 US tour; 2019 West End revival
- Awards: 1965 Tony Award for Best Musical; 1965 Tony Award for Best Score; 1965 Tony Award for Best Book; 1991 Tony Award for Best Revival of a Musical; 2020 Olivier Award for Best Musical Revival; 2025 Olivier Award for Best Musical Revival

Fiddler on the Roof is a musical with music by Jerry Bock, lyrics by Sheldon Harnick, and book by Joseph Stein, set in the Pale of Settlement of Imperial Russia in or around 1905. It is based on "Tevye the Dairyman" and other short stories by Sholem Aleichem. The story centers on Tevye, a Jewish milkman in the fictional village of Anatevka, who attempts to maintain his people's traditions as outside influences encroach upon his family's lives. He must cope with the strong-willed actions of his three older daughters who wish to marry for love; their choices of husbands are successively less palatable for Tevye. An edict of the tsar eventually evicts the Jews from their village.

The original Broadway production of the show, which opened in 1964, was the first musical theatre run in history to surpass 3,000 performances. Fiddler held the record for the longest-running Broadway musical for almost 10 years until Grease surpassed its run. The production earned $1,574 for every dollar invested and was critically acclaimed, winning nine Tony Awards, including best musical, score, book, direction and choreography. It spawned five Broadway revivals and a successful 1971 film adaptation and has enjoyed enduring international popularity. It has also been a popular choice for school and community productions.

== Background ==
Fiddler on the Roof is based on a series of stories by Sholem Aleichem about his character Tevye the Dairyman, which he wrote in Yiddish between 1894 and 1914 about Jewish life in a village in the Pale of Settlement of Imperial Russia at the turn of the 20th century. The stories are based on Aleichem's own upbringing near Kyiv (fictionalized as Yehupetz). It is also influenced by Life is with People, by Mark Zborowski and Elizabeth Herzog. Aleichem wrote a dramatic adaptation of the stories that he left unfinished at his death, but which was produced in Yiddish in 1919 by the Yiddish Art Theater and made into a film in the 1930s. In the late 1950s, a musical based on the stories, called Tevye and his Daughters, was produced off-Broadway by Arnold Perl. Rodgers and Hammerstein and then Mike Todd briefly considered bringing this musical to Broadway but dropped the idea.

The Fiddler by Marc Chagall, c. 1912

Investors and some in the media worried that Fiddler on the Roof might be considered "too Jewish" to attract mainstream audiences. Other critics considered that it was too culturally sanitized, "middlebrow" and superficial; Philip Roth, writing in The New Yorker, called it shtetl kitsch. For example, it portrays the local Russian officer as sympathetic, instead of brutal and cruel, as Sholom Aleichem had described him. Aleichem's stories ended with Tevye alone, his wife dead and his daughters scattered; at the end of Fiddler, the family members are alive, and most are emigrating together to America. The show found the right balance for its time, even if not entirely authentic, to become "one of the first popular post-Holocaust depictions of the vanished world of Eastern European Jewry". Harold Prince replaced the original producer, Fred Coe, and brought in director/choreographer Jerome Robbins. The writers and Robbins considered naming the musical Tevye, before landing on a title suggested by various paintings by Marc Chagall (Green Violinist (1924), Le Mort (1924), The Fiddler (1912)) that also inspired the original set design. Contrary to popular belief, the "title of the musical does not refer to any specific painting".

During rehearsals, one of the stars, Jewish actor Zero Mostel, feuded with Robbins, whom he held in contempt because Robbins had cooperated with the House Un-American Activities Committee and hid his Jewish heritage from the public. (Mostel, conversely, was admired for his confrontational testimony before the committee that led to his blacklisting in the 1950s.) Other cast members also had run-ins with Robbins, who reportedly "abused the cast, drove the designers crazy [and] strained the good nature of Hal Prince".

== Synopsis ==
=== Act I ===
Tevye is a poor Jewish milkman in the Russian Empire. He and his bossy, sharp-tongued wife Golde have five daughters (eldest to youngest): Tzeitel, Hodel, Chava, Shprintze and Bielke. Tevye explains the customs of the Jews in the Russian shtetl of Anatevka in 1905, where their lives are as precarious as the perch of a fiddler on a roof ("Tradition"). At Tevye's home, everyone is busy preparing for the Sabbath meal, with Golde directing their daughters. Yente, the village matchmaker, arrives to tell Golde that widowed Lazar Wolf – the wealthy local butcher, who is older than Tevye – wants to wed Tzeitel. Hodel and Chava are excited about Yente's visit, but Tzeitel illustrates how it could have bad results ("Matchmaker, Matchmaker"). A girl from a poor family must take whatever husband Yente brings; yet Tzeitel wants to marry her childhood friend, Motel the tailor.

Tevye is delivering milk, pulling the cart himself, as his horse is lame. He asks God: Whom would it hurt "If I Were a Rich Man"? The bookseller tells Tevye news from the outside world of pogroms and expulsions. Perchik, a student from the university in Kyiv, (Note: Most likely, this refers to the Saint Vladimir Imperial University of Kiev, where some Jews were permitted to study under quotas established by the Russian Empire.) hears their conversation and scolds them for doing nothing more than talk. The men dismiss Perchik as a radical, but Tevye invites him home for the Sabbath meal and offers him food and a room in exchange for tutoring his two youngest daughters. Golde tells Tevye to meet Lazar after the Sabbath but does not tell him why, knowing that Tevye does not like Lazar. Worried that Yente will find her a husband soon, Tzeitel tells Motel to ask Tevye for her hand before the Sabbath dinner. Motel resists, as he fears Tevye's temper, and tradition says that a matchmaker must arrange marriages. Motel is also very poor and is saving up to buy a sewing machine before he approaches Tevye, to show that he can support a wife. The family gathers for the "Sabbath Prayer".

After the Sabbath, Tevye meets Lazar for a drink at the village inn, assuming mistakenly that Lazar wants to buy his cow. Once the misunderstanding is cleared up, Tevye agrees to let Lazar marry Tzeitel – with a rich butcher, his daughter will never want for anything. All join in the celebration of Lazar's good fortune; even the Russian youths at the inn join in the celebration and show off their dancing skills ("To Life"). Outside the inn, Tevye happens upon the Russian Constable, who has jurisdiction over the Jews in the town. The Constable warns him that there is going to be a "little unofficial demonstration" in the coming weeks (a euphemism for a minor pogrom). The Constable has sympathy for the Jewish community but is powerless to prevent the violence.

The next morning, after Perchik's lessons with the younger sisters, Tevye's second daughter Hodel mocks Perchik's Marxist interpretation of a Bible story. He, in turn, criticizes her for hanging on to the old traditions of Judaism, noting that the world is changing. To illustrate this, he dances with her, defying the prohibition against opposite sexes dancing together. The two begin to fall in love. Later, a hungover Tevye announces that he has agreed that Tzeitel will marry Lazar Wolf. Golde is overjoyed, but Tzeitel is devastated and begs Tevye not to force her. Motel arrives and tells Tevye that he is the perfect match for Tzeitel and that he and Tzeitel gave each other a pledge to marry. He promises that Tzeitel will not starve as his wife. Tevye is stunned and outraged at this breach of tradition, but impressed at the timid tailor's display of backbone. After some soul-searching ("Tevye's Monologue"), Tevye agrees to let them marry, but he worries about how to break the news to Golde. An overjoyed Motel celebrates with Tzeitel ("Miracle of Miracles").

In bed with Golde, Tevye pretends to be waking from a nightmare. Golde offers to interpret his dream, and Tevye "describes" it ("Tevye's Dream"). Golde's grandmother Tzeitel returns from the grave to bless the marriage of her namesake, but to Motel, not to Lazar Wolf. Lazar's formidable late wife, Fruma-Sarah, rises from her grave to warn, in graphic terms, of severe retribution if Tzeitel marries Lazar. The superstitious Golde is terrified, and she quickly counsels that Tzeitel must marry Motel. While returning from town, Tevye's third daughter, the bookish Chava, is teased and intimidated by some gentile youths. One, Fyedka, protects her, dismissing the others. He offers Chava the loan of a book, and a secret relationship begins.

The wedding day of Tzeitel and Motel arrives, and all the Jews join the ceremony ("Sunrise, Sunset") and the celebration ("The Wedding Dance"). Lazar gives a fine gift, but an argument arises with Tevye over the broken agreement. Perchik ends the tiff by breaking another tradition: he crosses the barrier between the men and women to dance with Tevye's daughter Hodel. The celebration ends abruptly when a group of Russians rides into the village to perform the "demonstration". They disrupt the party, damaging the wedding gifts and wounding Perchik, who attempts to fight back, and wreak more destruction in the village. Tevye instructs his family to clean up the mess.

=== Act II ===
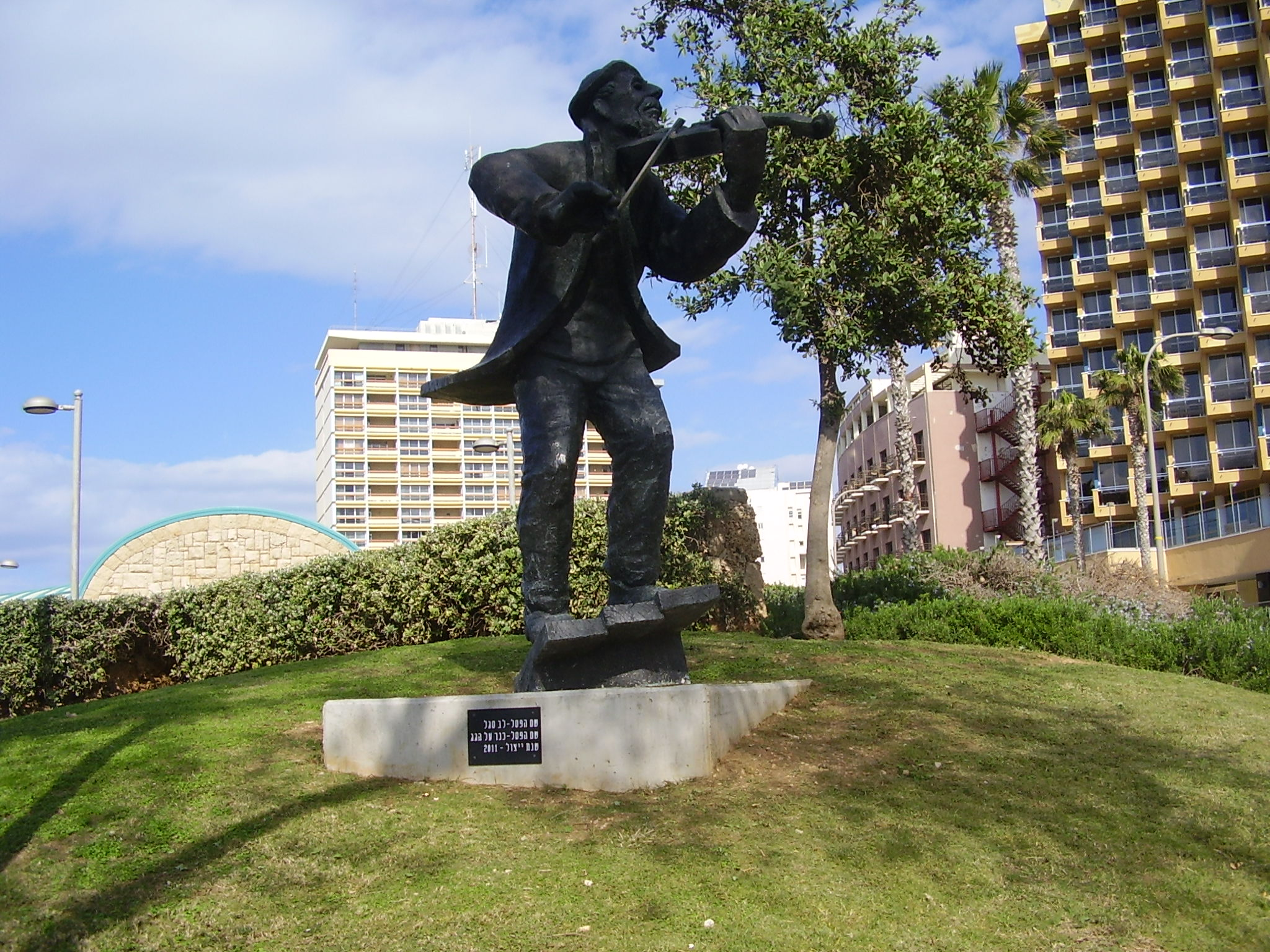
Fiddler On the Roof by Lev Segal in Netanya, Israel

Months later, Perchik tells Hodel he must return to Kyiv to work for the revolution. He proposes marriage, admitting that he loves her, and says that he will send for her. She agrees ("Now I Have Everything"). They tell Tevye that they are engaged, and he is appalled that they are flouting tradition by making their own match, especially as Perchik is leaving. When he forbids the marriage, Perchik and Hodel inform him that they do not seek his permission, only his blessing. After more soul searching, Tevye relents – the world is changing, and he must change with it ("Tevye's Rebuttal"). He informs the young couple that he gives them his blessing and his permission.

Tevye explains these events to an astonished Golde. "Love", he says, "it's the new style." Tevye asks Golde, despite their own arranged marriage, "Do You Love Me?" After dismissing Tevye's question as foolish, she eventually admits that, after 25 years of living and struggling together and raising five daughters, she does. Meanwhile, Yente tells Tzeitel that she saw Chava with Fyedka. News spreads quickly in Anatevka that Perchik has been arrested and exiled to Siberia ("The Rumor/I Just Heard"), and Hodel is determined to join him there. At the railway station, she explains to her father that her home is with her beloved, wherever he may be, although she will always love her family ("Far From the Home I Love").

Time passes. Motel has purchased a used sewing machine, and he and Tzeitel have had a baby. Chava finally gathers the courage to ask Tevye to allow her marriage to Fyedka. Again Tevye reaches deep into his soul, but marriage outside the Jewish faith is a line he will not cross. He forbids Chava to speak to Fyedka again. When Golde brings news that Chava has eloped with Fyedka, Tevye wonders where he went wrong ("Chavaleh Sequence"). Chava returns and tries to reason with him, but he refuses to speak to her and tells the rest of the family to consider her dead. Meanwhile, rumors are spreading of the Russians expelling Jews from their villages. While the villagers are gathered, the Constable arrives to tell everyone that they have three days to pack up and leave the town. In shock, they reminisce about "Anatevka" and how hard it will be to leave what has been their home for so long.

As the Jews leave Anatevka, Chava and Fyedka stop to tell her family that they are also leaving for Kraków, unwilling to remain among the people who could do such things to others. Tevye still will not talk to her, but when Tzeitel says goodbye to Chava, Tevye prompts her to add "God be with you." Motel and Tzeitel go to Poland as well but will join the rest of the family when they have saved up enough money. As Tevye, Golde and their two youngest daughters leave the village for America, the fiddler begins to play. Tevye beckons with a nod, and the fiddler follows them out of the village.

== Musical numbers ==
Act I

- "Prologue: Tradition" – Tevye and Company
- "Matchmaker, Matchmaker" – Tzeitel, Hodel and Chava
- "If I Were a Rich Man" – Tevye
- "Sabbath Prayer" – Tevye, Golde, Company
- "To Life" – Tevye, Lazar Wolf, Russian soloist and Men
- "Tevye's Monologue" – Tevye
- "Miracle of Miracles" – Motel
- "Tevye's Dream" – Tevye, Golde, Grandma Tzeitel, Rabbi, Fruma-Sarah and Company
- "Sunrise, Sunset" – Tevye, Golde, Perchik, Hodel and Company
- "The Bottle Dance" – Instrumental

Act II

- "Entr'acte" – Orchestra
- "Now I Have Everything" – Perchik and Hodel
- "Tevye's Rebuttal" – Tevye
- "Do You Love Me?" – Tevye and Golde
- "The Rumor/I Just Heard" – Yente and Villagers (Note: The 2004 revival featured a song for Yente and some women of the village (Rivka and Mirala) titled "Topsy Turvy", discussing the disappearing role of the matchmaker in society. The number replaced "The Rumor/I Just Heard".)
- "Far From the Home I Love" – Hodel
- "Chavaleh (Little Bird)" – Tevye
- "Anatevka" – The Company

== Principal characters ==
All of the characters are Jewish, except as noted:

- Tevye, a poor milkman with five daughters. A firm supporter of the traditions of his faith, he finds many of his convictions tested by the actions of his three oldest daughters.
- Golde, Tevye's sharp-tongued wife.
- Tzeitel, their oldest daughter, about nineteen. She loves her childhood friend Motel and marries him, even though he's poor, begging her father not to force her to marry Lazar Wolf.
- Hodel, their daughter, about seventeen. Intelligent and spirited, she falls in love with Perchik and later joins him in Siberia.
- Chava, their daughter, about fifteen. A shy and bookish girl, who falls in love with Fyedka.
- Motel Kamzoil, a poor but hardworking tailor who loves, and later marries, Tzeitel.
- Perchik, a student revolutionary who comes to Anatevka and falls in love with Hodel. He leaves for Kyiv, is arrested and exiled to Siberia.
- Fyedka, a young Christian. He shares Chava's passion for reading and is outraged by the Russians' treatment of the Jews.
- Lazar Wolf, the wealthy village butcher. Widower of Fruma-Sarah. Attempts to arrange a marriage for himself to Tzeitel.
- Yente, the gossipy village matchmaker who matches Tzeitel and Lazar.
- Grandma Tzeitel, Golde's dead grandmother, who rises from the grave in Tevye's "nightmare".
- Fruma-Sarah, Lazar Wolf's dead wife, who also rises from the grave in the "nightmare".
- Rabbi, the wise village leader.
- Constable, the head of the local Russian police, a Christian.

== Casts ==
| Character | Broadway | West End | Broadway revival | Broadway revival | West End revival | Broadway Revival | West End revival | Broadway Revival | West End revival | Broadway revival | West End revival |
| Character | 1964 | 1967 | 1976 | 1981 | 1983 | 1990 | 1994 | 2004 | 2007 | 2015 | 2019 |
|---|---|---|---|---|---|---|---|---|---|---|---|
| Tevye | Zero Mostel | Chaim Topol | Zero Mostel | Herschel Bernardi | Chaim Topol | Chaim Topol | Chaim Topol | Alfred Molina | Henry Goodman | Danny Burstein | Andy Nyman |
| Golde | Maria Karnilova | Miriam Karlin | Thelma Lee | Maria Karnilova | Thelma Ruby | Marcia Lewis | Sara Kestelman | Randy Graff | Beverley Klein | Jessica Hecht | Judy Kuhn |
| Tzeitel | Joanna Merlin | Rosemary Nicols | Elizabeth Hale | Lori Ada Jaroslow | Jane Gurnett | Sharon Lawrence | Jacquelyn Yorke | Sally Murphy | Frances Thoburn | Alexandra Silber | Molly Osborne |
| Hodel | Julia Migenes | Linda Gardner | Christopher Callan | Donalyn Petrucci | Andrea Levine | Tia Riebling | Jo John | Laura Michelle Kelly | Alexandra Silber | Samantha Massell | Harriet Bunton |
| Chava | Tanya Evertt | Caryl Little | Nancy Tomkins | Liz Larsen | Lisa Jacobs | Jennifer Prescott | Adi Topol-Margalith | Tricia Paoluccio | Natasha Broomfield | Melanie Moore | Nicola Brown |
| Motel Kamzoil | Austin Pendleton | Jonathan Lynn | Irwin Pearl | Michelan Sisti | Peter Whitman | Jack Kenny | Neil Rutherford | John Cariani | Gareth Kennerley | Adam Kantor | Joshua Gannon |
| Perchik | Bert Convy | Sandor Elès | Jeff Keller | James Werner | Steven Mann | Gary Schwartz | Peter Darling | Robert Petkoff | Damian Humbley | Ben Rappaport | Stewart Clarke |
| Fyedka | Joe Ponazecki | Tim Goodman | Rick Friesen | Joel Robertson | Christopher Snell | Ron Bohmer | Kieran Creggan | David Ayers | Michael Conway | Nick Rehberger | Matthew Hawksley |
| Lazar Wolf | Michael Granger | Paul Whitsun-Jones | Paul Lipson | Paul Lipson | David Jackson | Mark Zeller | David Bacon | David Wohl | Victor McGuire | Adam Dannheisser | Dermot Canavan |
| Yente | Beatrice Arthur | Cynthia Grenville | Ruth Jaroslow | Ruth Jaroslow | Maria Charles | Ruth Jaroslow | Margaret Robertson | Nancy Opel | Julie Legrand | Alix Korey | Louise Gold |

=== Notable replacements ===
Broadway (1964–72)

- Tevye: Luther Adler, Herschel Bernardi, Harry Goz, Paul Lipson
- Golde: Peg Murray, Martha Schlamme, Dolores Wilson
- Tzeitel: Rosalind Harris, Bette Midler
- Hodel: Adrienne Barbeau, Susan Hufford
- Perchik: Leonard Frey, Michael Zaslow
- Lazar Wolf: Paul Lipson
- Yente: Florence Stanley

Broadway revival (1990–91)

- Perchik: Brad Little

Broadway revival (2004–06)

- Tevye: Harvey Fierstein
- Golde: Andrea Martin, Rosie O'Donnell
- Yente: Barbara Barrie

Broadway revival (2015–16)

- Golde: Judy Kuhn
- Lazar Wolf: Steven Skybell

== Productions ==
=== Original productions ===
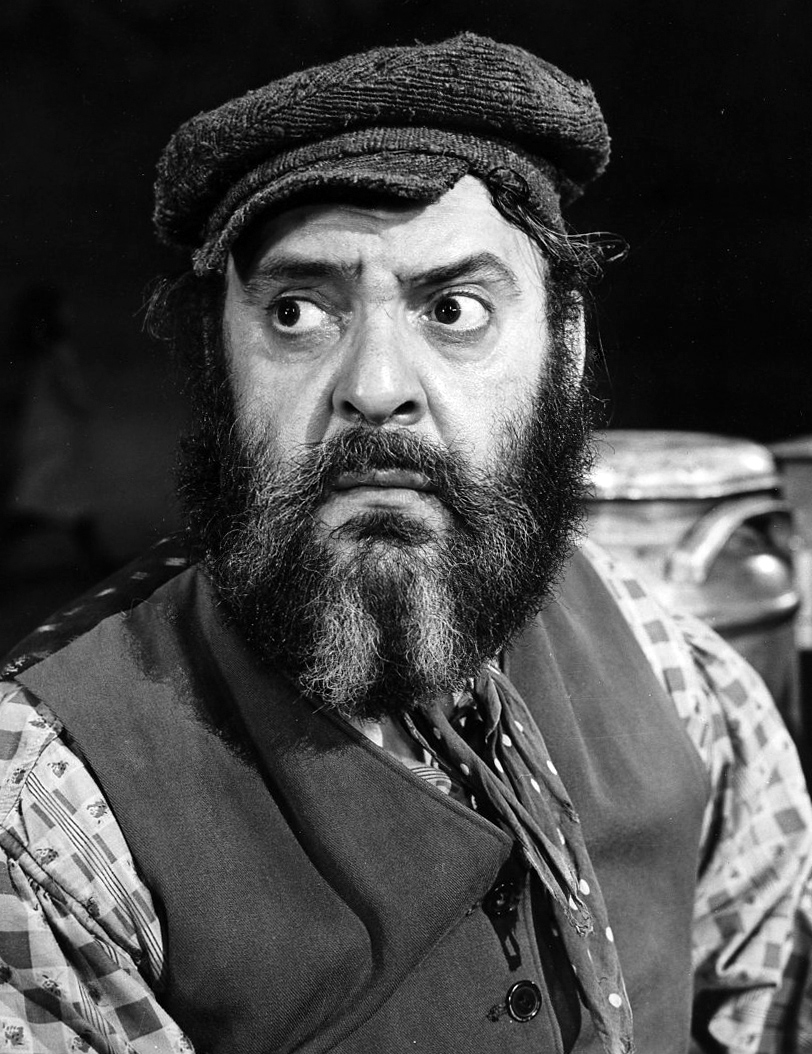
Zero Mostel as Tevye in the original Broadway production, 1964

Following its tryout at Detroit's Fisher Theatre in July and August 1964, then Washington in August to September, the original Broadway production opened on September 22, 1964, at the Imperial Theatre, transferred in 1967 to the Majestic Theatre and in 1970 to the Broadway Theatre, and ran for a record-setting total of 3,242 performances. The production was directed and choreographed by Jerome Robbins – his last original Broadway staging. The set, designed in the style of Marc Chagall's paintings, was by Boris Aronson. A colorful logo for the production, also inspired by Chagall's work, was designed by Tom Morrow. Chagall reportedly did not like the musical.

The cast included Zero Mostel as Tevye the milkman, Maria Karnilova as his wife Golde (both won a Tony for their performances), Beatrice Arthur as Yente the matchmaker, Austin Pendleton as Motel, Bert Convy as Perchik the student revolutionary, Gino Conforti as the fiddler, and Julia Migenes as Hodel. Mostel ad-libbed increasingly as the run went on, "which drove the authors up the wall". Joanna Merlin originated the role of Tzeitel, which was later assumed by Bette Midler during the original run. Carol Sawyer was Fruma Sarah, Adrienne Barbeau took a turn as Hodel, and Pia Zadora played the youngest daughter, Bielke. Both Peg Murray and Dolores Wilson made extended appearances as Golde, while other stage actors who have played Tevye include Herschel Bernardi, Theodore Bikel and Harry Goz (in the original Broadway run), and Leonard Nimoy. Mostel's understudy in the original production, Paul Lipson, went on to appear as Tevye in more performances than any other actor (until Chaim Topol), clocking over 2,000 performances in the role in the original run and several revivals. Florence Stanley took over the role of Yente nine months into the run. The production earned $1,574 for every dollar invested in it. It was nominated for ten Tony Awards, winning nine, including Best Musical, score, book, direction and choreography, and acting awards for Mostel and Karnilova.

The original London West End production opened on February 16, 1967, at Her Majesty's Theatre and played for 2,030 performances. It starred Topol as Tevye, a role he had previously played in Tel Aviv, and Miriam Karlin as Golde. Alfie Bass, Lex Goudsmit and Barry Martin eventually took over as Tevye. Topol later played Tevye in the 1971 film adaptation, for which he was nominated for an Academy Award, and in several revivals over the next four decades. The show was revived in London for short seasons in 1983 at the Apollo Victoria Theatre and in 1994 at the London Palladium.

=== Broadway revivals ===
The first Broadway revival opened on December 28, 1976, and ran for 176 performances at the Winter Garden Theatre. Zero Mostel starred as Tevye. Robbins directed and choreographed. Another Broadway revival opened on July 9, 1981, and played for a limited run (53 performances) at Lincoln Center's New York State Theater. It starred Herschel Bernardi as Tevye and Karnilova as Golde. Other cast members included Liz Larsen, Fyvush Finkel, Lawrence Leritz and Paul Lipson. Robbins directed and choreographed. A Broadway revival opened on November 18, 1990, and ran for 241 performances at the George Gershwin Theatre. Topol starred as Tevye, and Marcia Lewis was Golde. Robbins' production was reproduced by Ruth Mitchell and choreographer Sammy Dallas Bayes. The production won the Tony Award for Best Revival.

Another Broadway revival opened on February 26, 2004, and ran for 36 previews and 781 performances at the Minskoff Theatre. Alfred Molina, and later Harvey Fierstein, starred as Tevye, and Randy Graff, and later Andrea Martin and Rosie O'Donnell, was Golde. Barbara Barrie and later Nancy Opel played Yente, Laura Michelle Kelly played Hodel and Lea Michele played Sprintze. It was directed by David Leveaux. This production replaced Yente's song "The Rumor" with a song for Yente and two other women called "Topsy-Turvy". The production was nominated for six Tonys but did not win any. In June 2014, to celebrate the show's 50th anniversary, a gala celebration and reunion was held at the Town Hall in New York City to benefit National Yiddish Theatre Folksbiene, with appearances by many of the cast members of the various Broadway productions and the 1971 film, as well as Sheldon Harnick, Chita Rivera, Karen Ziemba, Joshua Bell, Jerry Zaks and others.

The Broadway revival began previews on November 20 and opened on December 20, 2015, at the Broadway Theatre, with concept and choreography based on the original by Robbins. Bartlett Sher directed, and Hofesh Shechter choreographed. The cast starred Danny Burstein as Tevye, with Jessica Hecht as Golde, Alexandra Silber as Tzeitel, Adam Kantor as Motel, Ben Rappaport as Perchik, Samantha Massell as Hodel and Melanie Moore as Chava. Judy Kuhn replaced Hecht as Golde on November 22, 2016, for the last five weeks of the run. Designers include Michael Yeargan (sets), Catherine Zuber (costumes) and Donald Holder (lighting). Initial reviews were mostly positive, finding Burstein and the show touching. The production was nominated for three Tony Awards but won none. It closed on December 31, 2016, after 463 performances. The U.S./Canadian tour of the Sher-directed production began in 2018 and was interrupted in March 2020 by the COVID-19 pandemic; it resumed in 2021 and continued into 2023. The role of Tevye was played by Yehezkel Lazarov for most of the run.

=== London revivals ===
Fiddler was first revived in London in 1983 at the Apollo Victoria Theatre (a four-month season starring Topol) and again in 1994 at the London Palladium for two months and then on tour, again starring Topol, and directed and choreographed by Sammy Dallas Bayes, recreating the Robbins production.

After a two-month tryout at the Crucible Theatre in Sheffield, England, a London revival opened on May 19, 2007, at the Savoy Theatre starring Henry Goodman as Tevye, Beverley Klein as Golde, Alexandra Silber as Hodel, Damian Humbley as Perchik and Victor McGuire as Lazar Wolf. The production was directed by Lindsay Posner. Robbins' choreography was recreated by Sammy Dallas Bayes (who did the same for the 1990 Broadway revival), with additional choreography by Kate Flatt.

A revival played at the Menier Chocolate Factory from November 23, 2018, until March 9, 2019, directed by Trevor Nunn and starring Andy Nyman as Tevye and Judy Kuhn as Golde. The production transferred to the Playhouse Theatre in the West End on March 21, 2019, with an official opening on March 27. It was nominated for eight Laurence Olivier Awards, winning Best Musical Revival. Replacement players included Maria Friedman as Golde and Anita Dobson as Yente. The run closed on November 2, 2019.

A revival played at the Regent's Park Open Air Theatre from July 27 to September 28, 2024, directed by Jordan Fein, starring Adam Dannheisser as Tevye, Lara Pulver as Golde, Liv Andrusier as Tzeitel, Georgia Bruce as Hodel, Hannah Bristow as Chava, Beverley Klein as Yente, Dan Wolff as Motel and Daniel Krikler as Perchik. The production was designed by Tom Scutt and choreographed by Julia Cheng. A review by Mark Lawson in The Guardian gave it five stars out of five and praised its use of the outdoor setting, its focus on "the tradition of deflective Jewish humour" and an ending that invites "a broader reflection of displacement and refugee status". The show was nominated for 13 Laurence Olivier Awards, winning 3, including Best Musical Revival. The production transferred to the Barbican Centre for an 8-week season from May 24 to July 19, 2025, before embarking on a UK and Ireland tour.

=== Other notable UK productions ===
A 2003 national tour played for seven months, with a radical design, directed by Julian Woolford and choreographed by Chris Hocking. The production's minimalist set and costumes were monochromatic, and Fruma-Sarah was represented by a 12-foot puppet. This production was revived in 2008 starring Joe McGann.

The show toured the UK again in 2013 and 2014 starring Paul Michael Glaser as Tevye with direction and choreography by Craig Revel Horwood.

A revival played at Chichester Festival Theatre from July 10 to September 2, 2017, directed by Daniel Evans and starring Omid Djalili as Tevye and Tracy-Ann Oberman as Golde.

=== Australian productions ===
The original Australian production opened on June 16, 1967, at Her Majesty's Theatre in Sydney. It starred Hayes Gordon as Tevye and Brigid Lenihan as Golde. The production ran for two years. The first professional revival tour was staged by the Australian Opera in 1984 with Gordon again playing Tevye. A young Anthony Warlow played Fyedka.

In 1998, 2005, 2006 and 2007, Topol recreated his role as Tevye in Australian productions, with seasons in Sydney, Brisbane, Melbourne, Perth, Wellington and Auckland. The musical was again revived in Melbourne and Sydney in 2015–2016 with Anthony Warlow as Tevye, Sigrid Thornton as Golde and Lior as Motel.

An Australian tour is expected to begin on July 31, 2026, at the Theatre Royal Sydney, starring Troy Sussman as Tevye. This production is a replica of the 2025 UK tour.

=== Other notable North American productions ===
Topol in 'Fiddler on the Roof': The Farewell Tour opened on January 20, 2009, in Wilmington, Delaware. Topol left the tour in November 2009 due to torn muscles. He was replaced by Harvey Fierstein and Theodore Bikel. The cast included Mary Stout, Susan Cella, Bill Nolte, Erik Liberman, Rena Strober, and Stephen Lee Anderson.

National Yiddish Theatre Folksbiene mounted a Yiddish adaptation, Fidler Afn Dakh, at the Museum of Jewish Heritage in New York City, under the direction of Joel Grey, with a translation by Shraga Friedman that was first used in a 1965 Israeli production. The cast included Steven Skybell, who repeated the role of Tevye, Jackie Hoffman as Yente, Daniel Kahn as Pertshik, Stephanie Lynne Mason as Hodel and Raquel Nobile as Shprintze. Previews began on July 4, and opening night was July 15, 2018. The production played through the end of that year. It then transferred to Stage 42, an off-Broadway theatre, with Skybell, Hoffman, Mason and Nobile reprising their roles. Previews began February 11, with opening night on February 21, 2019. Musical staging was by Staś Kmieć (based on the original choreography by Robbins), with set design by Beowulf Boritt, costumes by Ann Hould-Ward, sound by Dan Moses Schreier and lighting by Peter Kaczorowski. The production closed on January 5, 2020. It won the 2019 Drama Desk Award for Outstanding Revival of a Musical.

=== International and amateur productions ===
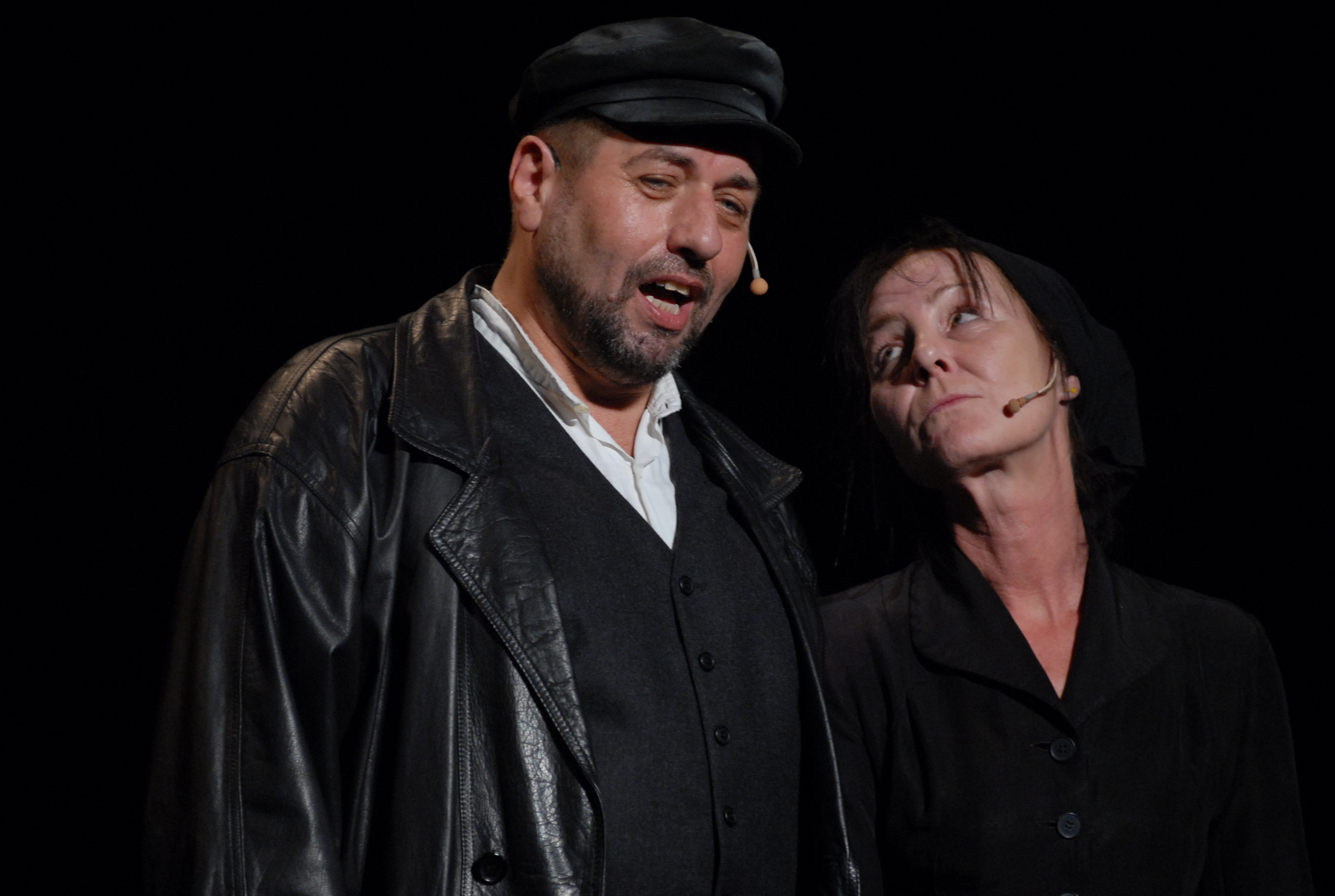
2006 production at the Brno City Theatre in the Czech Republic

The musical was an international hit, with early productions playing throughout Europe, in South America, Africa and Australia; 100 different productions were mounted in the former West Germany in the first three decades after the musical's premiere, and within five years after the collapse of the Berlin Wall, 23 productions were staged in the former East Germany; and it was the longest-running musical ever seen in Tokyo. According to BroadwayWorld, the musical has been staged "in every metropolitan city in the world from Paris to Beijing."

A Hebrew language staging was produced in Tel Aviv by the Israeli impresario Giora Godik in the 1960s. This version was so successful that in 1965 Godik produced a Yiddish version translated by Shraga Friedman. A 2008 Hebrew-language production ran at the Cameri Theatre in Tel Aviv for more than six years. It was directed by Moshe Kepten, choreographed by Dennis Courtney and starred Natan Datner.

Un violon sur le toît was produced in French at Paris's théâtre Marigny from November 1969 to May 1970, resuming from September to January 1971 (a total of 292 performances) with Ivan Rebroff as Tevye and Maria Murano as Golde. Another adaptation was produced in 2005 at the théâtre Comédia in Paris with Franck Vincent as Tevye and Isabelle Ferron as Golde. The Stratford Shakespeare Festival produced the musical from April to October 2013 at the Festival Theatre directed and choreographed by Donna Feore. It starred Scott Wentworth as Tevye. An Italian version, Il violinista sul tetto, with lyrics sung in Yiddish and the orchestra on stage also serving as chorus, was given a touring production in 2004, with Moni Ovadia as Tevye and director; it opened at Teatro Municipale Valli in Reggio Emilia.

The musical receives about 500 amateur productions a year in the US alone.

== Recordings ==
Theatre historian John Kenrick wrote that the original Broadway cast album released by RCA Victor in 1964, "shimmers – an essential recording in any show lover's collection", praising the cast. The remastered CD includes two recordings not on the original album, the bottle dance from the wedding scene and "Rumor" performed by Beatrice Arthur. In 2020, the recording was selected by the Library of Congress for preservation in the National Recording Registry for being "culturally, historically, or aesthetically significant". Kenrick writes that while the original Broadway cast version is the clear first choice among recordings of this musical, he also likes the Columbia Records studio cast album with Bernardi as Tevye; the film soundtrack, although he feels that the pace drags a bit; and some of the numerous foreign versions, including the Israeli, German and Japanese casts.

== 1971 film ==
A film version of Fiddler on the Roof, directed and produced by Norman Jewison and Stein, who adapted his own book for the screenplay, was released in 1971 by United Artists; Chaim Topol starred as Tevye, and Norma Crane as Golde. The film received mostly positive reviews from film critics and became the highest-grossing film of 1971. Fiddler received eight Oscar nominations, including Best Picture, Best Director for Jewison, Best Actor in a Leading Role for Topol, and Best Actor in a Supporting Role for Leonard Frey (as Motel; in the original Broadway production, Frey was the rabbi's son). It won three, including best score/adaptation for arranger-conductor John Williams.

In the film version, the character of Yente is reduced, and Perchik's song to Hodel "Now I Have Everything" is cut and replaced by a scene in Kyiv. The "Chagall color palette" of the original Broadway production was exchanged for a grittier, more realistic depiction of the village of Anatevka.

== Cultural influence ==
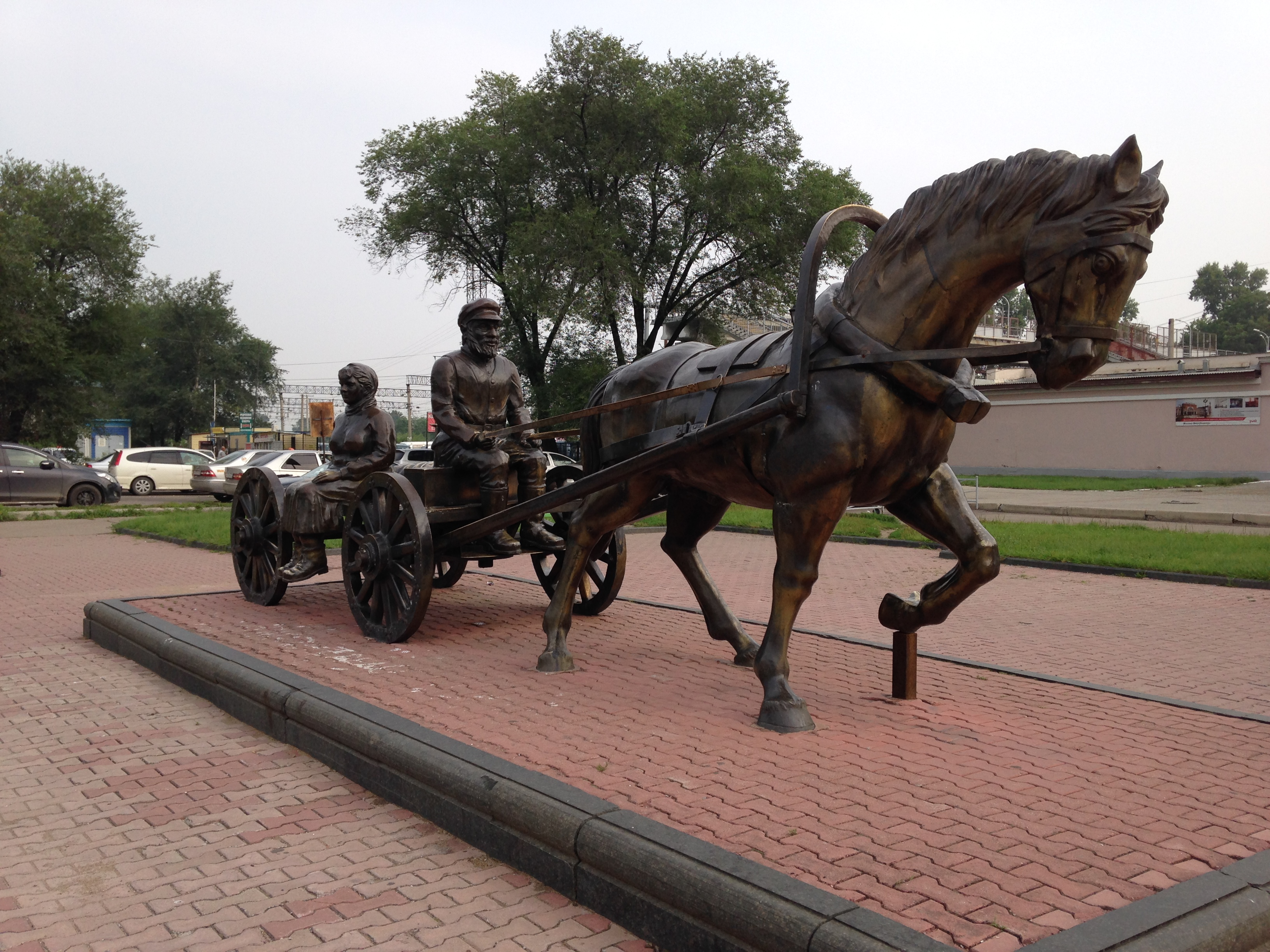
Statue of Tevye, his horse, wagon, and passenger in Birobidzhan, Russia

The musical's popularity has led to numerous references in popular media and elsewhere. A documentary film about the musical's history and legacy, Fiddler: A Miracle of Miracles, was released in 2019.

=== Parodies ===
Parodies relating to the show have included Antenna on the Roof (Mad magazine #156, January 1973), which speculated about the lives of Tevye's descendants living in an assimilated 1970s suburban America. In the film Mrs. Doubtfire (1993), Robin Williams parodies "Matchmaker". In a 1994 Animaniacs parody, Pigeon on the Roof, the Goodfeathers decide to marry their girlfriends; song parodies include "Scorsese" ("Tradition"), "Egg Hatcher" ("Matchmaker") and others. In 2001, the H. P. Lovecraft Historical Society published a musical theatre and album parody called A Shoggoth on the Roof, which sets music from Fiddler to a story based on the works of H. P. Lovecraft. Spanish comedian and TV-host Jose Mota parodied "If I Were a Rich Man" with the song "Si no fuera rico" ("If I weren't a rich man") during his 2008 New Year's Eve special.

References to the musical on television have included a 2005 episode of Gilmore Girls titled "Jews and Chinese Food", involving a production of the musical. A skit by The Electric Company is about a village fiddler with a fear of heights, so he is deemed "Fiddler on the Chair". In the Family Guy episode "When You Wish Upon a Weinstein" (2003), William Shatner is depicted as playing Tevye in a scene from Fiddler. The second episode of Muppets Tonight, in 1996, featured Garth Brooks doing a piece of "If I were a Rich Man" in which he kicks several chickens off the roof. "The Rosie Show", a 1996 episode of The Nanny, parodied the dream scene, when Mr. Sheffield fakes a dream to convince Fran not to be a regular on a TV show. A 2011 episode of NBC's Community, entitled "Competitive Wine Tasting", included a parody titled Fiddla, Please! with an all-black cast dressed in Fiddler on the Roof costumes, singing "It's Hard to Be Jewish in Russia, Yo". Chabad.org kicked off their 2008 "To Life" telethon with a pastiche of the fiddle solo and bottle dance from the musical.

Broadway references have included Spamalot, where a "Grail dance" sends up the "bottle dance" in Fiddler's wedding scene. In 2001, Chicago's Improv Olympic produced a well-received parody, "The Roof Is on Fiddler", that used most of the original book of the musical but replaced the songs with 1980s pop songs. In 2004 the original Broadway cast of the musical Avenue Q and the Broadway 2004 revival cast of Fiddler on the Roof collaborated for a Broadway Cares/Equity Fights AIDS benefit and produced an approximately 10-minute-long show, "Avenue Jew", that incorporated characters from both shows, including puppets. The song "Sunrise, Sunset" appears in the direct-to-video animated Disney film The Lion King 1½.

=== Covers ===
Songs from the musical have been covered by notable artists. For example, in 1964, jazz saxophonist Cannonball Adderley recorded the album Fiddler on the Roof, which featured jazz arrangements of eight songs from the musical. In a retrospective review AllMusic awarded the album 4 stars, stating, "Cannonball plays near his peak; this is certainly the finest album by this particular sextet". That same year, Eydie Gormé released a single of "Matchmaker", and jazz guitarist Wes Montgomery recorded the same tune for his album Movin' Wes.

In 1999, Knitting Factory Records released Knitting on the Roof, a compilation CD featuring covers of Fiddler songs by indie and experimental bands such as the Residents, Negativland, and the Magnetic Fields. Indie rock band Bright Eyes recorded an adaptation of "Sunrise, Sunset" on their 2000 album Fevers and Mirrors. Allmusic gave the album a favorable review, and the online music magazine Pitchfork Media ranked it at number 170 on their list of top 200 albums of the 2000s. In 2005, Melbourne punk band Yidcore released a reworking of the entire show called Fiddling on Ya Roof.

Gwen Stefani and Eve covered "If I Were a Rich Man" as "Rich Girl" for Stefani's 2004 debut solo album Love. Angel. Music. Baby. in 2004. The song was inspired by the 1993 British Louchie Lou & Michie One ragga version of the same name. Stefani's version reached No. 7 on the Billboard Hot 100 chart, where it remained for over six months. It was certified gold by the RIAA and nominated for a Grammy Award for Best Rap/Sung Collaboration. It was also covered in 2008 and 2009 by the Capitol Steps, poking fun at Illinois politics, especially then-Governor Rod Blagojevich. The Santa Clara Vanguard Drum and Bugle Corps performs the "Bottle Dance" from Fiddler as a "recurring trademark", including at the Drum Corps International World Championships.

=== Other ===
The song "Sunrise, Sunset" is often played at weddings, and in 2011 Sheldon Harnick wrote two versions of the song, suitable for same-sex weddings, with minor word changes. For example, for male couples, changes include "When did they grow to be so handsome?".

In 2015 a displaced persons camp southwest of Kyiv named Anatevka was built by Chabad Rabbi Moshe Azman to house the Jews fleeing the 2014 Russian invasion of Ukraine.

== Awards ==
Fiddler's original Broadway production in 1964 was nominated for ten Tony Awards, winning nine, including Best Musical, score, and book, and Robbins won for best direction and choreography. Mostel and Karnilova won as best leading actor and best featured actress. In 1972, the show won a special Tony on becoming the longest-running musical in Broadway history.

Its revivals have also been honored. At the 1981 Tony Awards, Bernardi was nominated as best actor. Ten years later, the 1991 revival won for best revival, and Topol was nominated as best actor. The 2004 revival was nominated for six Tony Awards and three Drama Desk Awards but won none. The 2007 West End revival was nominated for Laurence Olivier Awards for best revival, and Goodman was nominated as best actor. The 2019 West End revival won the Olivier Award for best revival, and it received a further 7 nominations. The Off West End production in 2024 was nominated for 13 Olivier Awards, winning 3, including best revival.

== Notes ==
=== References ===
| Preceded by Life with Father | Longest-running Broadway show 1972–1979 | Succeeded by Grease |
