= Matchmaker, Matchmaker =

Song from the musical Fiddler on the Roof

"Matchmaker, Matchmaker" is a song from the 1964 musical Fiddler on the Roof, with music by Jerry Bock and lyrics by Sheldon Harnick. The play was later made into a film in 1971. The story revolves around a poor Jewish milkman, Tevye, and his five daughters, as he attempts to maintain his Jewish traditions. His three eldest daughters marry, but each daughter's choice of husband moves further and further away from their traditions.

== Production ==
BlueGobo explains "The sisters (including Bette Midler) sang "Matchmaker, Matchmaker" on the 1968 Tonys as part of a tribute to past Best Musical winners that were still running at the time."

== Synopsis ==
Tevye and Golde's daughters sing about a matchmaker choosing a partner for them. Hodel and Chava sing excitedly about their future marriages, arranged by the matchmaker, Yente. However, Tzeitel, the eldest daughter, warns the others that, as they are from a poor family, they'll have to marry whoever Yente brings for them, regardless if it's an unhappy marriage. Towards the end of the song, the sisters quickly realise that they might rather remain on their own than marry just anybody.

== Analysis ==
The blog Sermons From Seattle explains "The story [of Fiddler] is that the matchmaker is to meet with the mother and father and match their three daughters to prospective husbands. But the girls want to choose their own partners and not use the matchmaker. Traditions are changing. Those old traditions are beginning to crumble".

This song epitomises the more traditional views regarding this issue that the daughters question at the very beginning. As time passes, they begin to think for themselves and change the tradition.

== Critical reception ==
AllMusic said the song was one of the "famous and now-standard songs" from the film. The Washington Times said it was the "big number" for "Tevye's forward-thinking daughters". The Washington Post describes the song as "eager". BroadwayWorld wrote it is a "good comic scene".

ChronicleLive's critic posited that "Matchmaker, Matchmaker, sung by the three rebellious older daughters, is just one of the fabulous musical numbers in this show". Star Tribune described it as "wistful". MostMetro said the song was "fun, graceful [and] typifies their close-knit sisterhood".
