= Tradition (song) =

Opening song from Fiddler on the Roof

Song

from the album Fiddler on the Roof
- Released: 1964
- Genre: show tune
- Composer: Jerry Bock
- Lyricist: Sheldon Harnick

"Tradition" is the opening number for the 1964 Broadway musical Fiddler on the Roof. In the song, the main character, Tevye, explains the roles of each social class (fathers, mothers, sons, and daughters) in the village of Anatevka, and how the traditional roles of people like the matchmaker, the beggar, and the rabbi contribute to the village. The song also mentions the constable, the priest, and the other non-Jews with whom they rarely interact. Later in the song, an issue involving an argument between two men about selling the other person a horse and delivering a mule (in the film, the argument is about whether a horse was 12 or 6, and in the Yiddish production, it is changed to a tsig (he-goat) and a bok (she-goat)) creates a ruckus in the village. Overall, the song sets up the major theme of the villagers trying to continue their traditions and keep their society running as the world around them changes.

== Appears in ==
- Fiddler on the Roof (1964–present)
- Fiddler on the Roof (1971). In the film version, the horse-mule incident is replaced by someone selling someone else a horse, telling him the horse was only six years old when it was really twelve.

== Reception ==
The song has been described as "groundbreaking" and "electrifying."
