= If I Were a Rich Man (song) =

Show tune from the 1964 musical Fiddler on the Roof

"If I Were a Rich Man" is a song in the 1964 musical Fiddler on the Roof, written by Sheldon Harnick and Jerry Bock. It is sung by the main character, Tevye, and reflects his aspirations. Its title was inspired by a 1902 monologue by Sholem Aleichem in Yiddish, Ven ikh bin Rothschild (Yiddish: װען איך בין ראָטשילד; lit. “If I were a Rothschild”), a reference to the wealth of the Rothschild family, although the content is different, and its words come partly from passages in Aleichem's 1899 short tale The Bubble Bursts. Monologue and tale both appeared in English in a 1949 collection of stories called Tevye's Daughters.

In June 2026, CBS News included the song in its list of the 250 essential American songs of the past 250 years.

== Analysis ==
The Oxford Companion to the American Musical wrote that the song includes passages of "cantor-like chanting", and is "the most revealing of the many character numbers". The Broadway Musical: A Critical and Musical Survey explained that the song contains a greater number of Jewish "commonplaces" than any other number in the score, and added the song does twofold: it "offers such a strong dose of idiom early in the show [which] is good for the overall unity", and the "important dramatic function" of introducing the central character of Tevye through song. History of the Literary Cultures of East-Central Europe explains that the song is based on a monologue from the stories of Sholem Aleichem entitled "If I were Rothschild", in reference to the wealthy Jewish banking family. The Grammar Devotional likens the phrase "if I were a rich man" to the Cowardly Lion's "if I were king of the forest" in The Wizard of Oz; both songs involve a tongue-in-cheek comparison between the character's actual condition and the one they imagine. It has been suggested that the song is inspired by a Hasidic folk song.

== Lyrics and style ==
Through the first two verses, Tevye dreams of the material comforts that wealth would bring him. He describes the enormous house he would buy and the needless luxuries he would fill it with, including a third staircase "leading nowhere, just for show," and then the poultry he would buy to fill his yard. In the third verse, Tevye switches his attention to the luxuries in which he would shower his wife, Golde.

In the bridge, Tevye contemplates the esteem that wealth would bring him, with important men seeking his advice. In the final verse, Tevye considers how wealth would allow him to spend less time working and more time praying and studying the Torah. He ends the song by asking God if it would "spoil some vast eternal plan" if he were wealthy.

A repeated phrase throughout the song, "all day long I'd bidi-bidi-bum," is often misunderstood to refer to Tevye's desire not to have to work. However, in an interview with Terry Gross, Sheldon Harnick said he basically made up syllables that he thought would give the effect of Chassidic chanting. The first person to play Tevye, Zero Mostel, then replaced the syllables Harnick had written with ones that Mostel thought would be more authentic.

== Covers and samples ==
- In September 1967, Bill and Boyd's version peaked at No. 24 on the Go-Set National Top 40 in Australia.
- In 1967, Chaim Topol recorded a version, billed as Topol and also credited as 'From the London cast production "Fiddler On The Roof"' (CBS 202651), it entered the UK Singles Chart on 20 April 1967 where it remained for 20 consecutive weeks peaking at nine.
- In 1967, Roger Whittaker recorded a version.
- The reggae song "Rich Girl", released in 1993 by Louchie Lou & Michie One and covered in 2004 by Gwen Stefani, is an adaptation of "If I Were a Rich Man".
- In 2001, the Australian punk band Yidcore recorded the song for their self-titled debut album and later on their Fiddlin' on ya Roof album.
- In 2013, French baritone David Serero recorded a French version which he modernized on a videoclip. Mr. Serero also himself sang the song in English.
- In 2021, it was sampled on Flo Milli's song "Roaring 20s".
- VoicePlay made a pop cover of the song with Ashley Diane in 2021.
