= To Life (song) =

Song from Fiddler on the Roof

Song

from the album Fiddler on the Roof
- Released: 1964
- Genre: show tune
- Composer: Jerry Bock
- Lyricist: Sheldon Harnick

"To Life" is a song from the 1964 musical Fiddler on the Roof.

== Synopsis ==
The Jewish people of Anatevka joyously sing a hopeful song in the face of an uncertain future. It also serves as a toast to celebrate a wedding agreement between Tevye and Lazar.

Seen and Heard wrote "In the inn scene Tevye leads a toast ‘To Life’ featuring an extravagant display of Jewish and Cossack folk dancing".

== Critical reception ==
NewsWorks described it as a "winning song", and added "the perfectly paced scene changes the tone of the production and accelerates its beat". The Toronto Star says it is a "raucous tavern brawl". Chicago Theater Review deems it a "joyous barroom anthem". Decent Films Guide names it "boisterous". NC Arts Review jokingly noted "Russian dancers show off their culture’s great history of destroying their kneecaps through dance".

== In other media ==
A modified version of the song was sung by Dafna Dekel and Sigal Shachmon during the interval act of the Eurovision Song Contest 1999.

In the eighth episode of the first season of The Big Bang Theory, a drunk Sheldon Cooper performs the song at the Cheesecake Factory.

== See also ==
- L'Chaim
