= Do You Love Me? (Fiddler on the Roof song) =

Song
- Language: English
- Released: 1964
- Length: 3:14
- Composer: Jerry Bock
- Lyricist: Sheldon Harnick

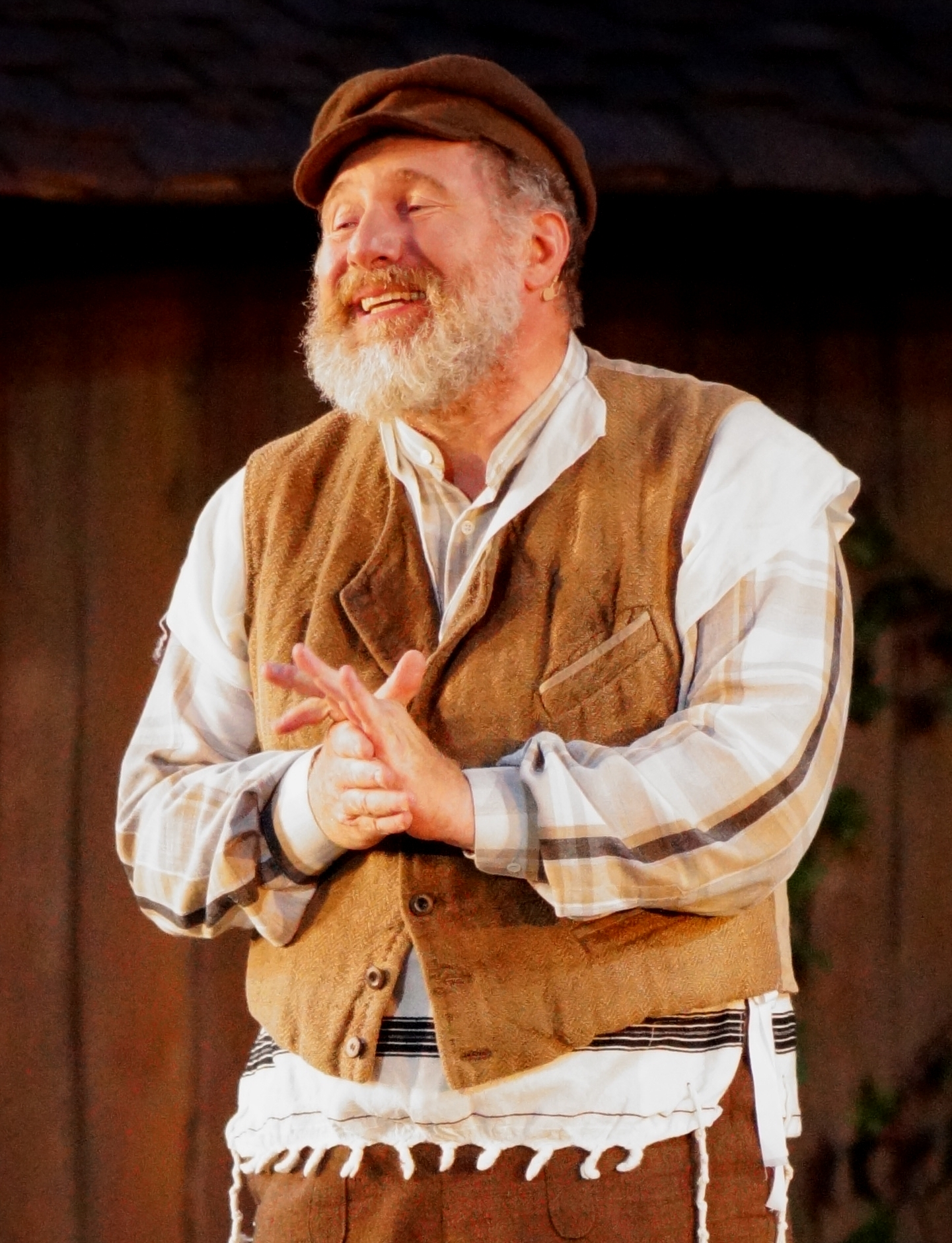
Topol in costume as Tevye during production of the film adaptation

"Do You Love Me?" is a song from the 1964 musical Fiddler on the Roof. It is performed by Tevye and his wife Golde.

== Production ==
Chaim Topol explained:

Just to mention another example, when I started the show, I was married nine years. When we sang "Do You Love Me", Golde and I, there is a line about "after 25 years." At that time, 25 years seemed inconceivable. Now that I've experienced 52 years of marriage to the same wonderful lady, 25 years seems like a children's game.

== Synopsis ==
Tevye and Golde's daughters choose men they love as marital partners. As they themselves had an arranged marriage, Tevye asks Golde if she actually loves him.

Southern Light Opera explains "'Do You Love Me?' sums up the confusion in Tevye's mind as times change".

== Critical reception ==
Culture in Northern Ireland described it as "lovely". According to The Irish Times, "In an enchanting duet with his wife, Tevye philosophises about the existence of love in his own 25-year marriage – 'Do You Love Me' is one of the most memorable songs of the evening and captures the vividness of Sheldon Harnick's lyrics." Daily Breeze says "There's no surprise at the end of the couple's duet, 'Do You Love Me?' when indeed she reveals her love." Seen and Heard names it "bittersweet". The Shuttle described it as "an inoffensive but adorable highlight". Talkin' Broadway notes one performance was "sweet, charming and completely realistic". Decent Films Guide called it "quietly bittersweet". The Des Moines Register named it an "old-married-couple duet".
