= Sunrise, Sunset =

1964 song from Fiddler on the Roof musical

"Sunrise, Sunset" is a song from the musical Fiddler on the Roof written in 1964 by composer Jerry Bock and lyricist Sheldon Harnick. The song is performed at the wedding of Tzeitel (Tevye and Golde's eldest daughter). The two parents sing about how they can't believe their daughter and her groom have grown up, while Hodel and Perchik sing about whether there may be a wedding in the near future for them.

== Production ==
Lyricist Sheldon Harnick said:

I do remember when we wrote "Sunrise Sunset," the first person we played it for was Jerry Bock's wife... and when I finished, then I looked at Jerry's wife Patti and I was startled to see that she was crying. And I thought, my goodness; this song must be more effective than we even know. And the same thing happened – I am not a pianist but the music to "Sunrise Sunset" is easy enough so that I could learn the piano part – and I played it for my sister. And when I finished I looked and she had tears in her eyes. And that was a very unusual experience.

The album Sheldon Harnick: Hidden Treasures (1949–2013) features the demo recording of "Sunrise, Sunset" featuring Harnick, accompanied by composer Jerry Bock. Harnick said, "This CD set is supposed to be the unknown songs, and the two men who created it, Bill Rudman and Ken Bloom, when they said they wanted to use "Sunrise, Sunset," I said, but that's a very familiar song. They said, not with you singing it."

== Critical reception ==
The Irish Times said the song has a "hypnotic chorus". AllMusic deemed it one of the film's "famous and now-standard songs". Splash Magazine named it one of the musical's "big Broadway numbers". The Style Weekly critic said the song, along with Tradition, had "infectious strains". The Des Moines Register noted that the musical "melts into bittersweetness" at this song. The Northampton Chronicle critic opined that it was "poignant". Virtual Shropshire's critic wrote that the song "wrings the heart ... as Tevye's daughters approach marrying age." Register Citizen described the song as a "heartbreaking parental cry to slow down the years, to keep their children young: 'Wasn't it yesterday when they were small?'" AZ Central noted the song was "haunting and emotional". Blue Coupe wrote, "Musically, the scene's centerpiece is the classic 'Sunrise, Sunset'".

== Recordings ==
- In early 1965, Eddie Fisher signed Dot Records, with whom his first release was scheduled to be the single "Sunrise, Sunset". The song was heavily promoted, with Dot buying out advertisements and Fisher performing it on multiple shows, notably The Ed Sullivan Show. Whilst seeing an international release, it had charted only in the US, reaching No. 119 on the Billboard Hot 100 and the Cashbox Top 100 Singles charts, marking a return to them. The song was ranked higher on the Billboard Easy Listening chart, peaking at No. 22.
- Grant Green recorded the song in 1971 for his Shades of Green jazz album.
- Anthony Newley and Linda Hibberd (1995) — Fiddler on the Roof [1995 Studio Cast]
- Bing Crosby recorded the song for his 1972 album Bing 'n' Basie.
- Johnny Hartman recorded the song for his 1964 album The Voice That Is!
- In late 1966, Roger Williams released his instrumental version. This version reach No. 84 on the US Hot 100 singles chart, and No. 5 on the Easy Listening chart.
- Harry James released a version in 1967 on his album Our Leader! (Dot DLP 3801 and DLP 25801).
- Jerry Vale — for his album Great Moments on Broadway (1966)
- Perry Como — included in his album Look to Your Heart (1968)
- Robert Goulet — for his album On Broadway (1965)
- Miriam Makeba on the album The Magic of Makeba- RCA LSP3512 (1965)
- Lee Morgan — Delightfulee (1967)
- Roger Whittaker — for his album This Is Roger Whittaker (1969)
- Bobby Vinton — for his album Bobby Vinton Sings the Newest Hits (1967)
- Steve Lawrence and Eydie Gormé — included in their album Together on Broadway (1967)
- Topol and Miriam Karlin — Fiddler on the Roof (Original London Cast) (1969)
- Vera Lynn — included in the album Hits of the 60's — My Way (1970)
- John Gary — RCA Victor 45 RPM single 47-8479 (1964)
- Juan Pablo Di Pace — Dark Horse Label Digital Single (2018)
- Sonny Criss — This Is Criss! (1966).
- Timon and Pumbaa — The Lion King 1½ (2004).
- John Stamos and Dave Coulier — on Full House (1987)
- Juan Pablo Di Pace — on Fuller House (2018)
- Matt Berry, Natasia Demetriou, and Mark Proksch — closing credits of "Sunrise, Sunset" on What We Do in the Shadows (2022)

== As a wedding song ==
"Sunrise, Sunset" is often played at weddings. In 2011 Sheldon Harnick wrote two versions of the song, suitable for same-sex weddings, with minor word changes. For example, for male couples, changes include "When did they grow to be so handsome", and for female couples, "When did she grow to be this tall?"
