= Josh Grisetti =

American actor (1981–2026)

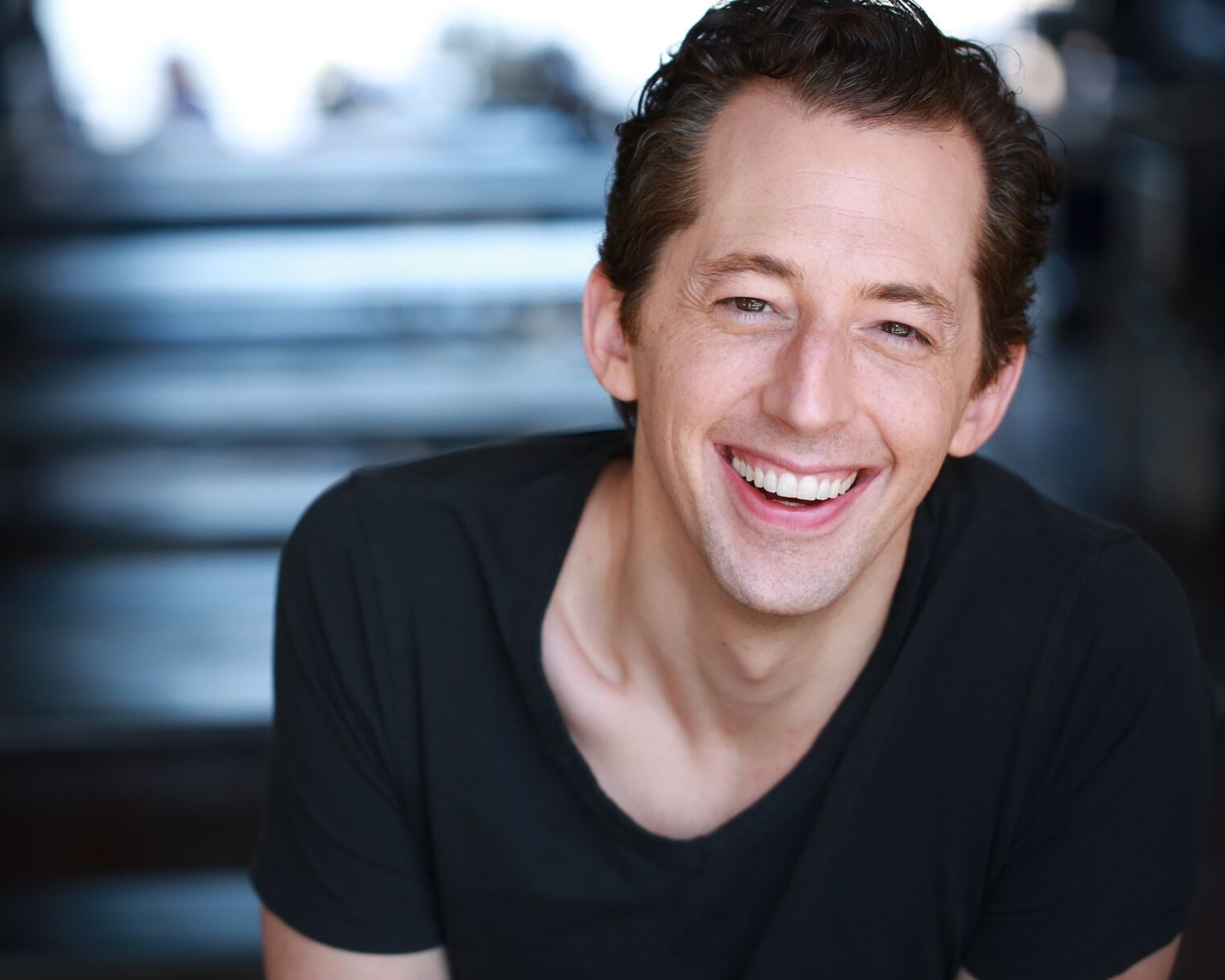
- Grisetti in 2018
- Born: Joshua Steven Grisetti; December 1, 1981; Washington, D.C., U.S.
- Died: July 10, 2026 (aged 44)
- Education: Boston Conservatory (BFA); Loyola Marymount University (MFA)
- Occupations: Actor; director; author
- Years active: 2004–2026
- Spouses: Candice Ross (m. 2009; div. 2015); Mackenzie Perpich (m. 2020)
- Website: www.joshgrisetti.com

Joshua Steven Grisetti (December 1, 1981 – July 10, 2026) was an American actor, director, educator, and author who worked in theater, television, and film.

== Early life ==
Joshua Steven Grisetti was born in Washington, D.C., on December 1, 1981, and grew up in Rocky Mount, outside of Roanoke, Virginia. He attended Franklin County High School in Rocky Mount before graduating from North Carolina School of the Arts with a high school diploma in drama in 2000. He attended college at The Boston Conservatory where he graduated in 2004 with a Bachelor of Fine Arts in Musical Theatre.

== Career ==
=== Broadway and Off-Broadway ===
Grisetti starred in the York Theatre's 2008–2009 musical adaption of Enter Laughing (originally titled So Long, 174th Street), garnering a Theatre World Award for "Outstanding Debut Performance" as well as Drama Desk, Outer Critics Circle, Lucille Lortel and Drama League Award nominations. Grisetti was supposed to have made his Broadway debut in the 2009–2010 season, starring as "Eugene Morris Jerome" in the Neil Simon revival of Broadway Bound, directed by David Cromer. Because of poor ticket sales, Broadway Bound's sister show (Brighton Beach Memoirs) closed just days after opening at the Nederlander Theatre, canceling Broadway Bound two weeks before its scheduled premiere. In 2011, he portrayed Mordred in a Broadway concert of Camelot.

His actual Broadway debut took place in the original musical It Shoulda Been You in 2015, playing the role of Marty Kaufman. He received nominations from the Drama Desk Awards and the Outer Critics Circle for his performance, and won one of two 2015 Clarence Derwent Awards. He returned to Broadway in 2016 to replace John Cariani as Nigel Bottom in Something Rotten! and originated the role on the first national tour (2017–18).

=== Television and film ===
In 2007, Grisetti starred in the short-lived ABC sitcom The Knights of Prosperity. On film, he has appeared in The Immigrant, The Namesake and others. He also starred in two pilots for NBC, The Gates (2013) and Like Magic (2019), that were not ordered to series. He also appeared in a recurring role throughout the final season of The Marvelous Mrs. Maisel (2023) on Amazon Prime.

=== University teaching and TikTok presence ===
During the COVID-19 pandemic, Grisetti became the first graduate with an MFA in performance pedagogy from Loyola Marymount University in Los Angeles, CA. He began teaching at Cal State Fullerton in Fall 2021 where he helped redesign the BFA in Musical Theatre; he achieved tenure at the University two years later.

Grisetti also gained recognition for creating provocative TikTok content about musical theatre training frequently critiquing the higher education system—particularly the student loan industry.

=== Publishing ===
In February 2016, under his full name of Joshua Steven Grisetti, he published a memoir entitled God in my Head: the true story of an ex-Christian who accidentally met God. In this memoir, Grisetti claims he overdosed on pain medications while at his dentist's office and experienced a near-death experience in which God essentially explained to him the secrets of the universe. These 'secrets' are New Age in orientation, similar to the writings of Eckhart Tolle (A New Earth) and William Young (The Shack). The book was originally self-published, but subsequently purchased by Tantor Media and republished as an audiobook.

== Death ==
Grisetti died on July 10, 2026 from suicide by a self-inflicted gunshot wound, at the age of 44.

== Theatre credits ==
Year	Title	Role	Notes
2005	Camelot	Mordred	North Shore Music Theatre
2007–2008	Spamalot	Prince Herbert / Minstrel / French Guard / Not Dead Fred / The Historian	Las Vegas
2008–2009	Enter Laughing The Musical	David Kolowitz	Off-Broadway
2009	The Neil Simon Plays: Broadway Bound	Eugene Jerome	Nederlander Theatre
2010	How to Succeed in Business Without Really Trying	J. Pierrepont Finch	Freud Playhouse
2010	A Funny Thing Happened on the Way to the Forum	Hysterium	Williamstown Theatre Festival
2011	Camelot	Mordred	Broadway Concert
2011	Enter Laughing The Musical	David Kolowitz	Bay Street Theatre
2012	Rent	Mark Cohen	Off-Broadway
2013–2014	Peter and the Starcatcher	Fighting Prawn	Off-Broadway
2014	Camelot	Mordred	Kennedy Center
2014	Camelot	Mordred	Granada Theatre
2014–2015	Diner	Shrevie	Signature Theatre
2015	It Shoulda Been You	Marty Kaufman	Broadway
2016–2017	Something Rotten!	Nigel Bottom	Broadway
2017–2018	Something Rotten!	Nigel Bottom	US National Tour
2019	Beauty and the Beast	Lumiere	La Mirada Theatre for the Performing Arts
2019	Matilda	Mr. Wormwood	The Muny
2021	Spamalot	Sir Robin / 1st Sentry / Brother Maynard / 2nd Guard	Ogunquit Playhouse
2023	Joseph and the Amazing Technicolor Dreamcoat	Simeon	La Mirada Theatre for the Performing Arts
2023	Ragtime	Tateh	Broadway Sacramento
2024	SpongeBob SquarePants the Musical	Sheldon J. Plankton	Broadway Sacramento

== Awards and nominations ==
=== Awards ===
- 2015 Clarence Derwent Awards for "Most Promising Male Actor" – It Shoulda Been You
- 2011 Garland Award for "Performance in a Musical" – How to Succeed in Business Without Really Trying
- 2010 Los Angeles Ovation Award for "Lead Actor in a Musical" – How to Succeed in Business Without Really Trying
- 2009 Theatre World Award for "Outstanding Broadway/Off-Broadway Debut" – Enter Laughing The Musical

=== Nominations ===
- 2020 Los Angeles Ovation Award for "Featured Actor in a Musical" – Beauty and the Beast (musical)
- 2015 Drama Desk Award for "Outstanding Featured Actor in a Musical" – It Shoulda Been You
- 2015 Outer Critics Circle Award for "Outstanding Featured Actor in a Musical" – It Shoulda Been You
- 2012 Clive Barnes Award "Theatre Finalist" – Enter Laughing: The Musical
- 2009 Lucille Lortel Award for "Outstanding Lead Actor" – Enter Laughing: The Musical
- 2009 Outer Critics Circle Award for "Outstanding Actor in a Musical" – Enter Laughing: The Musical
- 2009 Drama League Award for "Distinguished Performance" – Enter Laughing: The Musical
- 2009 Drama Desk Award for "Outstanding Actor in a Musical" – Enter Laughing: The Musical
- 2006 Carbonell Award for "Best Actor in a Musical" – Where's Charley?
