= Chris Arpad =

American steel drummer (born 1967)

Christopher Arpad
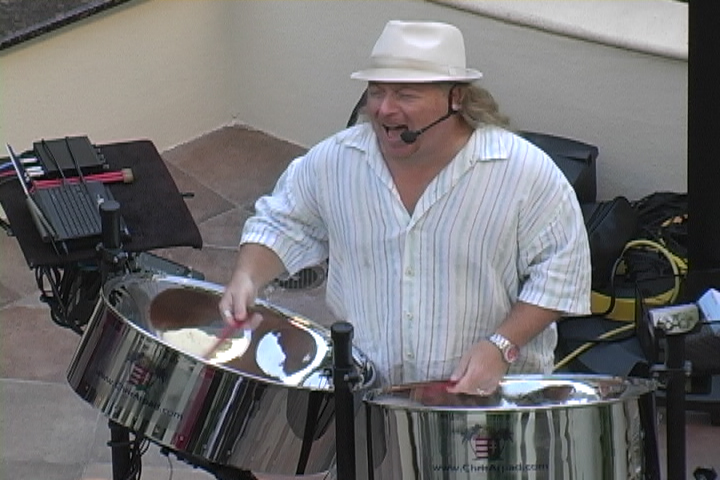
- Arpad in 2010

Background information
- Also known as: Steel Sunsations, DJ Arpad
- Born: Christopher John Arpad; July 27, 1967 (age 59); Osborne, Kansas
- Genres: Reggae, calypso, world music, pop, Scottish highland
- Occupations: Musician, solo steel pannist, percussionist, vocalist
- Instrument: Steelpans
- Years active: 1983–present
- Labels: World Beat; Catapult, Publishing; Panyard, Inc. Publishing; Milan; Shoot to Kill
- Formerly of: Stainless Steel
- Website: www.ChrisArpad.com

Christopher John Arpad (born July 27, 1967) is an American steel drummer based in Tucson, Arizona. He is best known for his solo steel drum performances which combine his own vocals and live steel pan with his custom instrumental and vocal backing tracks to create a full band sounds

== Early years ==
Chris grew up in McPherson, Kansas and attended Hutchinson Community College and Wichita State University.

== Career ==
Chris began performing and managing the band Stainless Steel from 1986 to 1991 and continued performing steel drums as a soloist and various other band formats to present. Stainless Steel was a regional success at the time, billed as "the Midwest's Only Steel Drum Band", touring the states of Minnesota, Kentucky, Colorado, Texas, Missouri, and Kansas. Stainless Steel opened concerts and shared stages with such notable acts as Carlos Santana, Andy Narell, Stanley Jordan, Sinbad, Tower of Power, Bonnie Raitt, Head East, Jeff Healey, The Rainmakers, and Steel Pulse; appearing at the annual South by Southwest, aka "SXSW", Music and Media Festival held in Austin Texas, in 1990 and 1991. Under Arpad's management, Stainless Steel was also a Central region showcase member of the National Association for Campus Activities, NACA, attending showcases and performing for college campuses throughout the region.

== Credits ==
- Steel drum soloist for a 2004 "Celebrity Mom" episode of television series show "Live Like A Star".
- Arpad executive produced and performed two recordings with Stainless Steel on the World Beat Record Label: A four-song EP, “Know Bounds, No Barriers”, and CD, “What You See”.
- Arrangement of three songs for solo Double Second Steel Drums; the Scott Joplin ragtime tune, "The Entertainer", and George Harrison classic, "Here Comes the Sun", and Herb Alpert's " Spanish Harlem". All edited by Steve Popernack and published through Panyard, Inc. Akron, Ohio circa 1993.
- January 2007, Chris Arpad recorded steel pans for the dream pop band West Indian Girl on the song "Up the Coast", the album 4th & Wall, released on the Milan Records label October 2007.
- June 2011 – Chris Arpad recorded steel pans with VH1 rock reality star Jeramy "Rainbow" Gritter, aka "Beardo", formerly with the band Whitestarr and the rockumentary TV show, The Rock Life. Arpad appears on the song "When I Think of U" – Attack Decay, on the Shoot to Kill records label.
- In 2013, Arpad provided song arrangement, vocals, and featured steel pans on Richard Bangs's song called "Cancún Colada" penned by Bangs for a segment piece on Cancún, featured on the series show Richard Bangs' Quest.
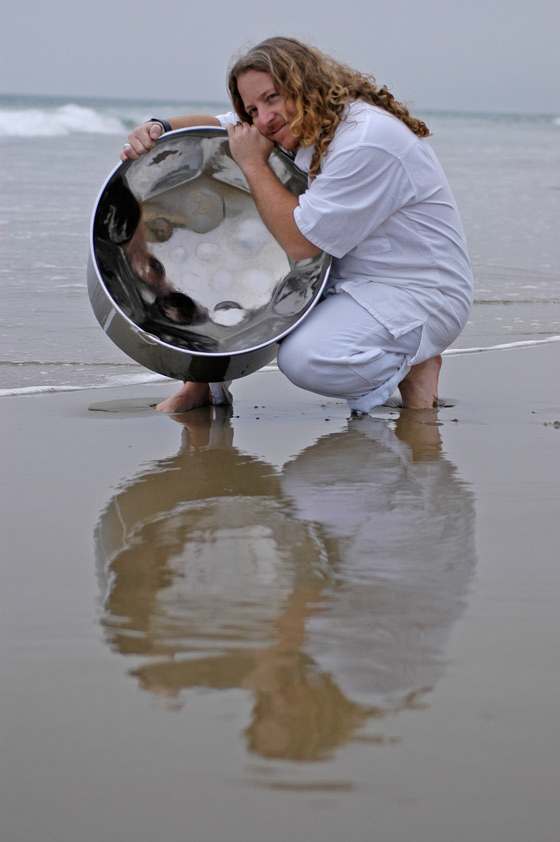
Arpad with a steelpan in Malibu.

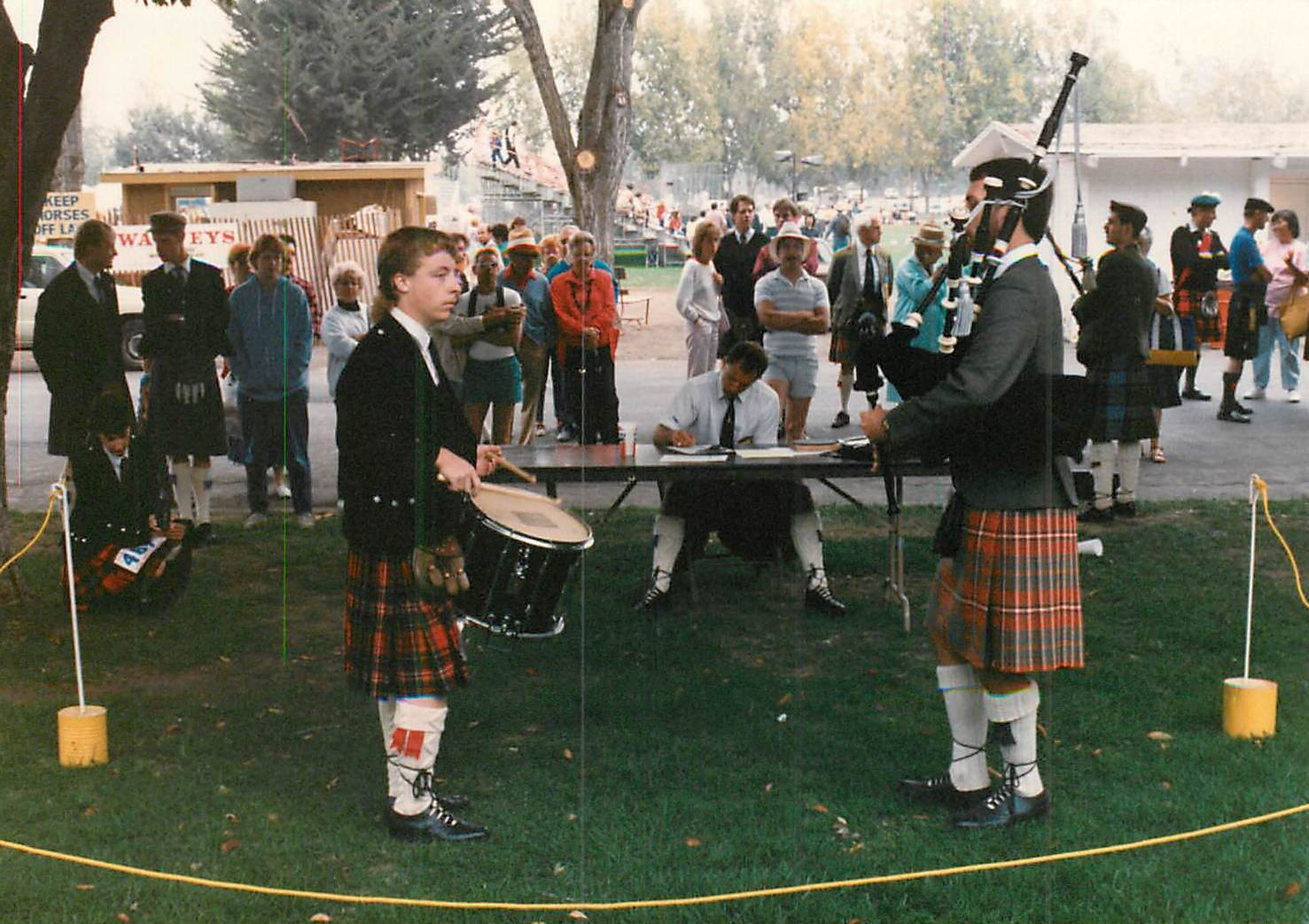
Chris Arpad, Scottish Highland Drum Competition Santa Rosa Highland Games, 1987.
