= Mrs. Gibbons' Boys (film) =

1962 British film by Max Varnel

- Directed by: Max Varnel
- Written by: Peter Blackmore; Max Varnel
- Based on: Mrs. Gibbons' Boys by: Joseph Stein; Will Glickman
- Produced by: Henry Halstead
- Starring: Kathleen Harrison; Lionel Jeffries; Diana Dors
- Cinematography: Stanley Pavey (as Stan Pavey)
- Edited by: Helen Wiggins
- Music by: Dave Shand
- Production company: Henry Halstead Productions (as Byron)
- Distributed by: British Lion Film Corporation (UK)
- Release date: April 1962
- Running time: 82 minutes
- Country: United Kingdom
- Language: English

Mrs. Gibbons' Boys is a black and white 1962 British comedy film directed by Max Varnel and starring Kathleen Harrison, Lionel Jeffries and Diana Dors. It is based on the play of the same name by Joseph Stein and Will Glickman, and was released in the UK as the bottom half of a double bill with Constantine and the Cross (1961).

== Plot ==
An ageing widow finally finds new love and happiness; but matters are complicated when her two convict sons escape from prison and beg her to hide them.

== Cast ==
- Kathleen Harrison as Mrs Gibbons
- Lionel Jeffries as Lester Gibbons
- Diana Dors as Myra
- John Le Mesurier as Cole
- Frederick Bartman as Mike Gibbons
- David Lodge as Frank Gibbons
- Dick Emery as Woodrow
- Eric Pohlmann as Morelli
- William Kerwin as Matthew
- Milo O'Shea as Horse
- Peter Hempson as Ronnie
- Penny Morrell as Pearl
- Nancy Nevinson as Mrs Morelli
- Mark Singleton as PC
- Tony Hilton as dustcart driver

== Production ==
Diana Dors was living in Los Angeles but returned to England to make the film.

== Critical reception ==
Monthly Film Bulletin said "This unhappy farce about the doting mother of three revolting thugs is redeemed from utter banality by a few slick lines (mostly spoken by Diana Dors as Mrs. Gibbons' hairdresser cousin, a "straight bird" with a purely decorative function in the film), a few scenes (such as poor, sad Lionel Jeffries purchasing some chocolates for his intended) that are not sadistically slapstick, and a valiant supporting cast. How admirably shopkeeper Eric Pohlmann falls for ever amid the ruins of his merchandise! The pace is fast enough to hold real boredom at bay, but the production is wholly unimaginative and the settings, especially Mrs. Gibbons' stagey parlour replete with doors, both dreary and repetitive."

Leslie Halliwell said: "Unattractive farce with clodhopping characters and too much slapstick."
