= Bao (musician) =

Vietnamese-American musician

Bao Vo
- Birth name: Bao Hoang-Nhat Vo
- Also known as: Bao, BAO
- Born: February 19, 1982 (age 43); Da Lat, Vietnam
- Genres: Pop music, Electronic music, Dream pop, Synth-pop
- Occupation(s): Musician, singer-songwriter, record producer
- Instrument(s): Guitar, piano, keyboards, drums, percussion
- Years active: 2002–present
- Labels: Monotone Records, Omega Point Records
- Website: baovomusic.com

Bao Vo (born February 19, 1982), also known as BAO, is a Vietnamese American musician, singer-songwriter, composer, and record producer based in Los Angeles, California.

He has done extensive work with other Asian American artists like Mariqueen Maandig and the band Ming & Ping, where he was responsible for the production, concept, branding, marketing, and visual design, in addition to being a co-writer to the music itself. He has also worked with The Slants, contributing songwriting and production as well as performing onstage with the all Asian American dance rock band.

== Biography ==
Vo was born in Da Lat, Vietnam and immigrated to the United States in 1985 with his mother and four siblings. He attended the High School for the Performing and Visual Arts (HSPVA) in Houston, TX and the Art Center College of Design in Pasadena, CA. He founded the band Ming & Ping in 2002 after dropping out of art school at San Francisco Art Institute, where he studied experimental music composition under Charles Boone, multimedia art under Sharon Grace, and digital audio production under Martin Schmidt of the experimental electronic band Matmos.

Ming & Ping released their debut album in 2004 through the Chicago-based independent record label Omega Point Records. The group is known for their visual art, costumes, and theatrical live performances that are primarily designed and directed by Vo, whose collaboration with other artists has yielded a large portfolio of photography, illustrations, videos, and costumes that is uncommon for independent musical acts. Vo is also responsible for assembling the musical act's supporting cast for their Cantonese Opera inspired live performances known as "The Ming & Ping Dynasty." These performances have been exhibited on tour with Freezepop and with groups such as Major Lazer, West Indian Girl, and Ultraviolet Sound.

In 2017, Vo released a five-song EP titled BAO EP under the stage name BAO. In 2017, he also founded a social impact organization called Other.Us, which helped up-and-coming Asian Americans in music. In 2018, his Other.Us organization was dissolved when he joined the board of directors for The Slants Foundation, founded by musician and activist Simon Tam. His musical influences include Prince, New Order, and Giorgio Moroder. In 2019, Vo composed the soundtrack for the documentary Quan 13, starring and directed by former Anthony Bourdain: Parts Unknown producer Hieu Gray, which premiered at the headquarters of Nguoi Viet Daily News, the largest daily newspaper published in Vietnamese outside of Vietnam.

In October 2020, Vo released his debut solo album, entitled "Perpetual Heartbreak," along with three video series to enhance the way audiences consume his music. According to his social media, the three series include "BAO Feels His Music," which shows Vo's reactions to each song on the album, "Behind BAO's Music," in which Vo describes the meaning behind each track, and "BAO Breaks Down," in which Vo details the technical aspects of the album's music production.

In 2023, Vo produced "The Band Plays On,' the final album by The Slants, along with Simon Tam and Joe X. Jiang. The 14-song collection features dozens of Asian American guest artists and instrumentalists including Jane Lui, Katherine Ho, Joe Kye, Johnny Hi-Fi, Talk Time, Darro, Othertones, Lola Menthol, The Complements, Alex Kade, and Mikara. Vo provides lead vocals on the album's title track, "The Band Plays On."
