= Fourth Wall (disambiguation) =

The fourth wall (more commonly used in the expression "breaking the fourth wall") refers to the concept in show business in which an imaginary "wall" exists separating theater audiences from the actors on stage.

Fourth Wall may also refer to:

- The Fourth Wall (Milne play), a 1929 play by A. A. Milne
- The Fourth Wall (Gurney play), a 1992 play
- The Fourth Wall (novel), a 2012 novel by Walter Jon Williams
- Fourth Wall (album), a 1981 album by The Flying Lizards
- 4th Wall (album), a 2023 album by Ruel
- 4th Wall Theatre, Inc., a theatre company in Bloomfield, New Jersey
- The Fourth Wall, a 2012 artist book by Max Pinckers
- The Fourth Wall (Le Quatrième Mur), a 2013 novel by Sorj Chalandon
- "The Fourth Wall", another name for the "Sullivanians" psychotherapy cult led by Saul B. Newton

== Breaking the Fourth Wall ==
- Breaking the Fourth Wall (album), a 2014 live album and video by Dream Theater
- "Breaking the Fourth Wall" (WandaVision), the seventh episode of the 2021 American television series WandaVision
- Breaking the Fourth Wall, a 2018 EP by the Slovenian metal band Negligence (band)

== See also ==
- 4th & Wall, a 2007 album by West Indian Girl
