= Street Scene (festival) =

Music festival in San Diego, California

- Genre: Zydeco, Blues, Rock and Alternative rock, alternative hip hop
- Dates: Summer
- Locations: Downtown San Diego, California, United States
- Years active: 1984 - 2009
- Website: www.street-scene.com

Street Scene was a music festival held each summer in San Diego, California, from 1984 to 2009. It was one of largest annual music festivals in the United States, growing to include over 70 musical acts covering various musical genres and styles on multiple stages.

== History ==
Beginning in 1984, a San Diego resident created Street Scene over two events, In May and August. The event was held on 5th Avenue, between J & K Streets, for the first few years, with two stages. In 1987, it grew to take up two blocks, but still with two stages. The following year, Street Scene grew once again to include five stages over several blocks; and more genres were included, such as zydeco, blues, rock and alternative rock.

In 1995 Street Scene expanded to three days.

In 2005, Street Scene re-located from downtown's Gaslamp Quarter to Qualcomm Stadium in Mission Valley.

In 2007, Street Scene was planned to move to the Del Mar Fairgrounds, but later changed to Coors Amphitheatre in Chula Vista, California.

In 2008, Street Scene returned to the downtown San Diego in the East Village neighborhood.

The 2009 event returned to the streets of the East Village on August 28 and 29.

== 2003 ==
Social Distortion, 311, R.E.M., Pennywise, X, Greg Ginn of Black Flag, Mix Master Mike, Bone Thugs-n-Harmony, The Distillers, The Doors of the 21st Century, Goo Goo Dolls, Concrete Blonde, Arthur Lee & Love, Dragons, Ozomatli, Michael Franti & Spearhead, De La Soul, All Mighty Senators, Sex Pistols, Cypress Hill, G. Love & Special Sauce, Slightly Stoopid, Arrested Development, John Butler Trio, Pepper, The Allman Brothers Band, The B-52s, Yonder Mountain String Band, Karl Denson's Tiny Universe, Buckwheat Zydeco, The Wild Magnolias, Café Tacuba, Kinky, Cheb i Sabbah, Karsh Kale, Radio Mundial, Little George Sueref & The Blue Stars with Lazy Lester, Louisiana Red, Macy Gray, Nickel Creek, Wilco, Switchfoot, The Subdudes, Bad Religion, Finch, Flogging Molly, Living Legends, The Reverend Horton Heat, Burning Spear, The Skatalites, Eek-A-Mouse, and Kathleen Edwards.

== 2004 ==
Ben Harper, Ludacris, P.O.D., Patti Smith, Jack Johnson, Social Distortion, Foo Fighters, A Tribe Called Quest, Ziggy Marley, Wyclef Jean, Jimmy Eat World, Cypress Hill, John Butler Trio, The Killers, Dilated Peoples, Louis XIV, A.F.I., Scarlet Symphony, Trinidadian steelpan orchestra), Brazilian Girls, Blackalicious, Eek-A-Mouse, Yellowcard, The Black Eyed Peas, Slightly Stoopid, and Authority Zero

== 2005 ==
The White Stripes, The Killers, Snoop Dogg, 311, The Black Eyed Peas, the Pixies, Garbage, the Used, The Flaming Lips, Method Man, Unwritten Law, Flogging Molly, Dashboard Confessional, Social Distortion, Death Cab for Cutie, Kasabian, Hot Hot Heat, Rise Against, Louis XIV, the Adolescents, The (International) Noise Conspiracy, Autolux, The Von Bondies, Swollen Members, Morningwood, the Locust, West Indian Girl, Mix Master Mike and Hard-Fi.

== 2006 ==
Tool, Kanye West, A.F.I., Snoop Dogg, Social Distortion, Yeah Yeah Yeahs, Wu-Tang Clan, Queens of the Stone Age, Sean Paul, Bad Religion, Bloc Party, Yellowcard, The Shins, Wolfmother, G. Love & Special Sauce, Steel Pulse, Donavon Frankenreiter, Slightly Stoopid, She Wants Revenge, Matchbook Romance, Rock Kills Kid, Particle, Nine Black Alps, New York Dolls, The Subways, Editors, Ska Cubano, Van Stone (Travis Draft and Dave Sheridan et al.), and The Futureheads.

== 2007 ==
The Killers, Muse, Social Distortion, Arctic Monkeys, Panic! at the Disco, The Crystal Method, T.I., Spoon, Ozomatli, Louis XIV, Slightly Stoopid, Air, G. Love & Special Sauce, Bad Brains, MIMS, Clap Your Hands Say Yeah, Gym Class Heroes, Too Short, Brand New, T-Pain, Rabbit In The Moon, Editors, Augustana, The Academy Is..., Jaguares, Matt Costa, Jack's Mannequin, Magic Pill, Mickey Avalon, Paolo Nutini, The Rocket Summer, Eek-A-Mouse, Mutemath, Infected Mushroom, VNV Nation, Fair to Midland, Mutemath, Honeycut, Punk Rock Karaoke, The Supersuckers, Sweet & Tender Hooligans, Elvis Perkins, Dios, My Evolution, and Shut Up Stella.

== 2008 ==
Beck, Devo (replacement headliner for The Black Crowes), Justice, Sound Tribe Sector 9, Michael Franti & Spearhead, The National, Spoon, Nortec Collective presents Bostich + Fussible, TV on the Radio, Cat Power, Hot Chip, Tegan and Sara, The New Pornographers, X, Vampire Weekend, Atmosphere, The Hives, Cold War Kids, GZA, Diplo, Ghostland Observatory, Spiritualized, Antibalas, Man Man, The Mother Hips, Tokyo Police Club, DeVotchKa, The Night Marchers, Does It Offend You, Yeah?, Del the Funky Homosapien, Eagles of Death Metal, The Muslims, Dengue Fever, MGMT, The Whigs, The Films, Foals, West Indian Girl, and Chester French.

== 2009 ==
The Black Eyed Peas, M.I.A, Public Enemy, Thievery Corporation, Modest Mouse, The Dead Weather, Silversun Pickups, Cake, Conor Oberst and the Mystic Valley Band, of Montreal, Band of Horses, The Faint, Bassnectar, Girl Talk, Busta Rhymes, Sharon Jones & The Dap-Kings, Chromeo, Cage the Elephant, Donald Glaude, Ted Leo and the Pharmacists, Mastodon, Ozomatli, Devendra Banhart, Shooter Jennings, Calexico, Nortec Collective, Delta Spirit, West Indian Girl, The Knux, No Age, Ra Ra Riot, Dungen, Deerhunter, Gram Rabbit, Matt & Kim, Los Campesinos!, Trombone Shorty, Louisiana Riots, Blue Scholars, Black Joe Lewis & the Honeybears, Wavves, Crocodiles, Holy Fuck, Anya Marina, Zee Avi, Extra Golden, Carney, and Dirty Sweet.

== 2010 ==
Attendance dropped precipitously in 2009 and in May 2010 an announcement was released indicating that there would be no 2010 festival.

Street Scene, San Diego’s largest and oldest annual rock music festival, will be dormant this summer after incurring major financial losses during its 25th anniversary edition last year.

— George Varga, Signon San Diego

== See also ==
- List of historic rock festivals
