= Ming and Ping =

- Origin: San Francisco, CA
- Genres: Pop, new wave, electroclash
- Years active: 2002-present
- Labels: Omega Point Records; Bao Vo Creative
- Website: www.mingping.com

Ming & Ping are an Asian American electronic pop band from Los Angeles. The group consists of Hong Kong born identical twin brothers Ming and Ping (last names unknown) and their producer/creative director Bao Vo.

== Biography ==
The band was formed in 2002 in San Francisco, California and released their first full-length album in 2004 entitled mingping.com with Chicago-based indie record label Omega Point Records. The brothers have stated in numerous interviews that they are heavily influenced by 80s new wave bands such as Pet Shop Boys and New Order, and their 2007 album Causeway Army appeared in XLR8R magazine's March 2008 top ten, where it was described as "full of high-energy electro pop that works just as well in a Prada boutique as it would a gritty nightclub in London."

Ming & Ping has gained a following largely from their songs appearing in snowboarding films and other sports film, television, and promotional spots from major companies like Burton Snowboards, Bombardier Ski-Doo, Transworld Snowboarding, Oakley, CrossFit, Alliance Wakeboard, among others.

The group is also known for their visual art, costumes, and theatrical live performances that are primarily directed by artist Bao Vo, whose collaboration with other artists has yielded a large portfolio of photography, illustrations, videos, and costumes that is uncommon for independent musical acts. Vo is also responsible for assembling the brothers as a musical act and the supporting cast for their Cantonese Opera inspired live performances known as "The Ming & Ping Dynasty." These performances have been exhibited on tour with Freezepop and with groups such as Major Lazer, West Indian Girl, and Ultraviolet Sound. West Indian Girl and How to Destroy Angels vocalist Mariqueen Maandig Reznor has appeared as a guest vocalist on two Ming & Ping songs, "Mixed Melodies" from their eponymous 2009 album and "Chinatown" from 2012's The Darkness of Night.

Ming & Ping notably employ mobile apps to aid in both the composition and distribution of their music. In 2009 they released an iPhone application entitled Ming & Ping Pong, a version of the game Pong featuring their music and visual aesthetic, and they make use of the Sonoma Wire Works application FourTrack and Retronyms' DopplerPad to begin work on new songs.

Interest in the group is aided by rumors that both twins are in fact the same performer. However, due to their rare public appearances, these rumors remain unconfirmed.

== Discography ==
=== Full-length albums ===
- mingping.com (2004, Omega Point Records)
- MP2 (2005, Omega Point Records)
- Causeway Army (2007, Bao Vo Creative)
- Ming & Ping (August 2009, Bao Vo Creative)
- The Light of Day / The Darkness of Night (October 2014, Bao Vo Creative)

=== Other releases ===
- Ming & Ping Live Vol.1 (2006, Bao Vo Creative) - recorded at a September 2006 show at the Rickshaw Stop, San Francisco, California.
- The Darkness of Night (2012, Bao Vo Creative) - the first of a pair of "Twin EP's" according to the album notes.
- Old Haunts New Feels (2016, Bao Vo Creative) - single released in digital formats only.
- Los Angeles November 2019 (2019, Bao Vo Creative) - 3-song EP inspired by the film Blade Runner by Ridley Scott.
- Los Angeles November 2019 (Instrumental Version) (2020, Bao Vo Creative) - 3-song EP featuring instrumental versions of the preceding EP.

=== Featured songs ===
- Dream of Pop was featured in Oakley's 2008 snowboarding film "Uniquely" for which they performed at the movie premiere party inside of Oakley headquarters.
- Sleep Now was featured in Oakley's wakeboarding film "Push Process" from 1242 Productions, November 2007.
- Beautiful Things was featured in the 2007 snowboarding film "Picture This" by Mack Dawg Productions (MDP)
- Dream of Pop (a short clip of the song) was featured in the 2007 snowboarding film "We're People Too" by Mack Dawg Productions (MDP)
- The Bluest Grey and Shenzhen Speed were featured in the Transworld Snowboarding 2005 Team Challenge DVD (November 2005 issue)
- Highrise Dragonflies Demo was featured in a 2006 Park City Mountain Resorts promotional DVD
- Spacey March Demo and Legend Demo are featured in Mack Dawg Productions' 2006 "People" Snowboarding DVD
- Delete was featured in Mack Dawg Productions for Ski-Doo Snowmobiles "Ski-Doo Freestyle" promotional video in 2006
- Delete was also featured in Some Kinda Life snowboarding film (2005, Neoproto Films)
- A.I., in remixed form, appears in Synthphony Records' REMIXed! Vol.#5 CD
- Shenzhen Speed was featured in Alliance Wakeboarding's Innuendo DVD (2006)
- Love, Jealousy, A Little Different, and Metallic Whispers used in different promotional videos for Snow Summit Inc (Big Bear Resorts) from 2005 to 2006
- Mission Control was featured in the snowboarding film As If! by Misschief Films (2006)
- Midnight on the Bridge was featured in the skiing/snowboarding film Witness by Ohio Freestyle and Kyle Decker (2006)
- Sofia (Ming & Ping Remix) is a remix of West Indian Girl's "Sofia" and appears on "4th On the Floor - West Indian Girl Remixes, Vol. 2" (2009, Smash Hit Music Co.)
- Thought Balloon (Ming & Ping Rethink) is a remix of Freezepop's "Thought Balloon" and appears on "Form Activity Motion" (2008, Freezepop)
- Heavensent - Ming & Ping Remix is a remix of a single by BAO (2017, Bao Vo Creative, Inc.)
