= So Long, 174th Street =

- Original Cast Recording
- Music: Stan Daniels
- Lyrics: Stan Daniels
- Book: Joseph Stein
- Basis: Enter Laughing by Joseph Stein; Enter Laughing by Carl Reiner
- Productions: 1976 Broadway

So Long, 174th Street is a musical with a book by Joseph Stein and lyrics and music by Stan Daniels.

Based on Stein's play Enter Laughing, which had been adapted from the Carl Reiner book of the same name and served as the basis for a 1967 film, it focuses on the journey of David Kolowitz from factory helper to actor and from insecure adolescence to self-assured adulthood in three whirlwind days in New York City in the late 1930s.

== Production ==
After six previews, the Broadway production, directed by Burt Shevelove and choreographed by Alan Johnson, opened on April 27, 1976, at the Harkness Theatre, where it closed after only 16 performances. The cast included Robert Morse, George S. Irving, Loni Ackerman, and Rita Rudner. Morse starred as David. Though "boyish looking," he was 45 years old and played a character half his age.

Clive Barnes of the New York Times observed "The people involved are talented enough...So what went wrong? How did Enter Laughing end up leaving us yawning?" He noted composer/lyricist Stan Daniels was a producer of The Mary Tyler Moore Show and suggested "he should stay where he is well off...when the music and lyrics do not work for a musical, the musical does not work."

Reiner said years later that he walked out on the play, that Morse was too old, and that "they made an abortion out of it."

Despite the initial unfavorable reviews, one number from the show, "The Butler's Song," became a cabaret standard. A recording of the score, with Kaye Ballard added to the cast, was released in 1981.

== Song list ==
- "David Kolowitz, the Actor"
- "It's Like"
- "Undressing Girls with My Eyes"
- "Bolero on Rye"
- "Whoever You Are"
- "Say the Words"
- "You"
- "My Son the Druggist"
- "You Touched Her"
- "Men"
- "Boy Oh Boy"
- "The Butler's Song"
- "Being with You"
- "If You Want to Break Your Father's Heart"
- "So Long, 174th Street"

== Revivals ==
The musical was revised in 2008 as Enter Laughing and staged Off-Broadway by the York Theatre. The York revived Enter Laughing again in 2019.
