= It Shoulda Been You =

2015 Broadway musical by Barbara Anselmi

- 2015 Broadway Playbill
- Music: Barbara Anselmi
- Lyrics: Brian Hargrove
- Book: Brian Hargrove
- Productions: 2011 George Street Playhouse; 2012 Village Theatre; 2015 Broadway

It Shoulda Been You is a musical with music by Barbara Anselmi and book and lyrics by Brian Hargrove. The musical ran on Broadway from March 17, 2015 (previews) to August 9, 2015. The musical involves a wedding which brings together the families who are quite, and comically, different.

== Production history ==
It Shoulda Been You premiered at the George Street Playhouse in New Brunswick, New Jersey, on October 4, 2011 and closed on November 4. The musical was directed by David Hyde Pierce and starred Tyne Daly (Judy Steinberg), Lisa Howard (Jenny Steinberg) and Harriet Harris (Georgette Howard). The book and lyrics are by Brian Hargrove with music by Barbara Anselmi, and additional lyrics by Jill Abramovitz, Carla Rose Fisher, Michael Cooper, Ernie Lijoi and Will Randall.

The musical ran at the Village Theatre in Issaquah, Washington, and Everett, Washington, from March 14, 2012, to May 20. The musical previously had a reading at the Village Theatre's Festival of New Musicals in 2010. The talkinbroadway reviewer wrote that "Lyricist Hargrove and composer Anselmi have created a pleasant score, if not one that offers many tunes you'll be humming as you exit." He called the musical "highly entertaining."

The musical premiered on Broadway at the Brooks Atkinson Theatre with previews from March 17, 2015 with an official opening on April 14, 2015. The production was directed by David Hyde Pierce with choreography by Josh Rhodes, sets by Anna Louizos, costumes by William Ivey Long, and lighting by Ken Billington. The cast starred Tyne Daly, Sierra Boggess, Harriet Harris, Lisa Howard, David Burtka, Montego Glover, Chip Zien, Josh Grisetti, Adam Heller, Michael X. Martin, Anne L. Nathan, Nick Spangler and Edward Hibbert.

On June 26, 2015, Tyne Daly made a curtain speech honoring the legalization of same-sex marriage in the United States.

The show closed August 9, 2015 after 31 previews and 135 regular performances.

The original Broadway production was nominated for six Outer Critics Circle Awards, three Drama League Awards and three Drama Desk Awards.

The musical premiered in New South Wales at the Independent Theatre in March 2017.

The musical was presented by the 4th Wall Theatre in Bloomfield, New Jersey, in June 2017.

The cast reunited for a one-night-only performance at the 92nd Street Y on March 5, 2018.

== Synopsis ==
At the St. George Hotel, it is the morning of Rebecca Steinberg and Brian Howard's wedding. Jenny, Rebecca's sister, talks of her nerves before the wedding and how glad she is that she isn't the one having to have all the problems of a bride ("I Never Wanted This"). Judy and Murray are Jenny and Rebecca's parents. Judy, an overbearing, talkative Jewish mother, barks commands at Jenny to make sure things are organized. While trying to keep things together, Jenny accidentally calls Rebecca's ex, Marty, and lets it slip the wedding is taking place that day. Marty is convinced that it is a sign that he needs to stop the wedding and talk Rebecca out of it. He rushes to the hotel.

The bride and groom share their mutual excitement and fears ("This Day (Opening)"). Things go well with a few comedic missteps, including the visible impact of the wedding on the groom's mother, Georgette, who doesn't want to lose her son to another woman. When things seem to settle, the best man, Greg, comes in and announces that Rebecca wants to stop the wedding. Jenny rushes to her side, and Rebecca says that there's a smudge on her wedding dress—it must be a sign.

Annie, the co-maid of honor, tries to talk to her along with Brian and Greg, until Brian insinuates that Annie has been too controlling over the wedding. That triggers something in Annie, and she runs off with Greg and Brian immediately rushing after her to apologize. Jenny once again smoothes over the situation by getting the stain out of the dress. Rebecca and Jenny sing about how much they admire each other, both seeing qualities in the other that they respect ("Perfect"). On the other side of the hotel, Marty arrives and is instantly spotted by Murray, who expresses his joy over seeing him before. Murray admits that he wishes it were Marty marrying Rebecca instead of Brian. He is joined by Judy, the drunken Uncle Morty, and flirtatious Aunt Sheila, who all echo this sentiment ("It Shoulda Been You").

When Jenny sees Marty, she tries to get him to leave. However, Marty appeals to their longtime friendship and all the times that he has been there for her. Jenny reminisces with him, and it's revealed they did get together, but for some reason Marty stopped calling her and she never knew why ("Who"). She reluctantly agrees to give him only a few short minutes with Rebecca. Meanwhile, Brian is having a few moments with George, his father. George says that now that Brian is getting married, he wants to try to have a closer relationship with him—something he and his own father never had ("Back in the Day"). He also gives Brian a pre-nuptial agreement and tells him to consider signing it before the wedding, completely unaware that Marty is hiding behind a plant and has heard their conversation.

The bridal party gets their hair and makeup done, and tensions between Georgette and Judy are running high. Rebecca and Jenny beg Judy to be polite. After Georgette, assuming a cheerful tone, takes a few back-handed jabs at her, Judy emulates her demeanor to hurl shots back at her, including pointing out Georgette's latest face lift ("Nice").

Marty arrives and throws everything into disarray when he announces the plans for the pre-nuptial agreement. Rebecca is shocked and runs off. Everyone goes to find her. Jenny starts panicking that the wedding will be over before it has begun. She is reassured by Albert, the wedding planner, that all will be well. He shares stories of all the weddings he's been involved in, pointing out that nothing has ever shocked him or prevented the ceremony from taking place, including that a wedding day pre-nuptial agreement is not legally binding ("Albert's Turn").

Brian tries to confide in Georgette and tells her that he owes everything he has achieved in life to her. As he leaves, Georgette laments losing her son to another woman and wishes he had turned out gay, or at least waited until after she died to find someone ("Where Did I Go Wrong?"). Everyone is still searching for Rebecca; they think she has left, but Albert appears with Rebecca dressed, made up, and ready to walk down the aisle. Judy and Murray admire her, and Judy tells Jenny to go get dressed. As she goes into the bathroom, Judy compliments Rebecca on how stunning she looks before saying she wishes Jenny had found someone. Judy suggests that it would be easier for Jenny to find someone if she lost weight. Rebecca retorts that this isn't fair, as Jenny has had a wonderful life and has done great things. Jenny hears this conversation as she exits the bathroom and is embarrassed. Everyone else leaves, and Jenny finishes dressing. As she does this, she expresses her frustration that even though she views herself as a truly beautiful and valuable person, she struggles to find people that view her as more than 'sort of pretty,' 'kind of sexy,' or just 'nice' ("Beautiful").

Outside the cathedral, Marty shows up one more time to try to convince Rebecca to call off the wedding. Rebecca considers it, but Jenny steps in and tells him to let Rebecca go and be happy. Marty reluctantly agrees, and the wedding goes ahead.

After the wedding, everyone gets ready for the reception. Murray and Judy rejoice that their daughter is finally married. Georgette is in despair and grabs George to head for the bar. Jenny is happy for her sister, but sad for herself. Rebecca and Brian, now in a private room, are just glad things went ahead ("A Perfect Ending"). Greg and Annie interrupt the newlyweds' alone time with champagne in hand to celebrate. They drink, and it is revealed that Greg and Brian are lovers as well as Annie and Rebecca. Jenny and Albert walk in and catch the two couples in the act. Rebecca tries to explain things to Jenny, but she is interrupted by Judy telling them the reception is about to start.

At the reception, Greg and Annie perform a garish song to their secret lovers declaring their undying devotion under the pretense of having written it for the wedding ("Love you Till the Day"). Rebecca tries to talk to Jenny again, but she is interrupted by Judy, who says it's time for the father-daughter dance. Rebecca tries to resist, but Judy says Jenny can use the dance to search for a husband. That finally sets Jenny off, and she storms away. Judy follows her and tries to see what's the matter while still giving her orders about details of the wedding, but Jenny has none of it. She decides that she's tired of being pushed around and mocked; she's going to have a quick fling and throw caution to the wind ("Jenny's Blues"). Marty comes in and she impulsively kisses him. Jenny runs off after she kisses him, but Marty follows her into the bathroom and presses her to explain why she kissed him. She denies it as anything serious, but Marty continues pushing before letting it slip that he knew Rebecca was gay and that's why he couldn't call Jenny back. He didn't trust himself not to tell her after he promised Rebecca he wouldn't. He then says that he never loved Rebecca, but he always loved Jenny. He continues, saying that if she wants him, he wants to start a romantic relationship or whatever she wants ("Whatever"). The two declare their feelings for each other and kiss. Albert comes in and says that Rebecca is about to tell Judy and Murray that she's gay. They run off to find her. However, what they don't realize is that Aunt Sheila was also in the bathroom (hooking up with a busboy) and has heard the whole thing.

Brian and George try to talk Rebecca out of revealing her sexuality on the day of the wedding. Jenny and Marty concur, but Rebecca says she's tired of living a lie. She wants to be who she is and wants to be with whom she loves ("A Little Bit Less Than"). Jenny hugs Rebecca and tells her she is strong. Judy and Murray come in to tell them the speeches are about to begin. Rebecca tries to get up the nerve to tell them but ultimately chickens out. As the rest of the family comes in, Aunt Sheila drunkenly announces that Rebecca is gay and, to the delight of Georgette, Brian also confesses his sexuality.

Judy and Marty are shocked and demand an explanation for why they went through with the wedding. Brian and Rebecca explain that they both met in college, and when they found out that each other was gay, they became close friends. As they, along with Annie and Greg, hit 30 they realized they were broke. Brian remembered that he had a trust fund in his name from his grandfather's will. However, the stipulation was that he had to be married to a woman, so he convinced Rebecca to marry him. Rebecca also reveals that she is pregnant with Brian's child as during a period of time when she struggled with her sexuality, she and Brian had a drunken fling. After they got over the shock, Annie and Greg accept it, and they all decided to raise the child together. To the delight of Rebecca and Brian, both of their parents are accepting of their sexuality. Judy and Murray are overjoyed that they will have a grandchild, and Georgette and George take glee in the fact that Brian's grandfather—a racist homophobe—would have hated it.

However, the wedding isn't over. Marty proposes to Jenny, saying he has been in love with her his whole life. Jenny says it is too soon, being that they never even dated. Judy convinces her, saying that she should go for it if she truly loves Marty. She says that love isn't about fairy tales—it takes time, and it involves taking risks and having the little moments that make a relationship come together ("What They Never Tell You").

Jenny and Marty both admit they have flaws, but they love each other, so it doesn't matter ("Perfect/Whatever" Reprise). Jenny says she doesn't have a dress, but Albert has it covered and hurries her off to get ready. Spurred by this quick wedding, Brian proposes to Greg and Rebecca to Annie, and they hurry off to make it a triple ceremony. With both sets of parents now alone together, they reflect over the events of the day, with the two mothers putting aside their differences because they are becoming a family ("That's Family").

Jenny emerges in her dress, and Judy says she looks beautiful. Marty happily agrees and the two marry ("Finale").

== Musical numbers ==
Source: Internet Broadway Database

- "I Never Wanted This" – Jenny
- "This Day (Opening)" – Company
- "Perfect" – Jenny and Rebecca
- "It Shoulda Been You" – Murray, Marty, Judy, Aunt Sheila and Uncle Morty
- "Who" – Marty and Jenny
- "Back in the Day" – George and Brian
- "Nice" – Judy & Georgette
- "Albert's Turn" – Albert, Walt, Mimsy, Jenny
- "Where Did I Go Wrong" – Georgette
- "Beautiful" – Jenny
- "A Perfect Ending" – Company
- "Love You Till the Day" – Greg and Annie
- "Jenny's Blues" – Jenny
- "Whatever" – Marty
- "A Little Bit Less Than" – Rebecca
- "What They Never Tell You" – Judy
- "Perfect/Whatever (Reprise)" – Marty and Jenny
- "That's Family" – Judy, Georgette, Murray and George
- "Finale" – Full Company

== Casts ==
Character	Broadway (2015)	Australia (2017)	New Jersey (2017)	Edinburgh Fringe (2017)	New Jersey (2022)
Jenny Steinberg	Lisa Howard	Chloe Angel	Julie Galorenzo	Marnie Yule	Evan T. Charpentier
Judy Steinberg	Tyne Daly	Kate Mannix	Jodi Freeman-Maloy	Cathy Geddie	Melissa Broder
Georgette Howard	Harriet Harris	Chapin Ayres	Christine Orzepowski	Rae Mitchell	Annette Winter
Rebecca Steinberg	Sierra Boggess	Michaela Leisk	Kelsey McCollaum	Elayn Fraser	Danielle C. Pennisi
Marty Kaufman	Josh Grisetti	Jon Emmett	Scott Baird	Ruairidh Nichols	Nicholas Culver
Brian Howard	David Burtka	David Berry	Chris Zika	Sean Taheny	Joshua Switala
Annie Shepard	Montego Glover	Dylan Hayley Rosenthal	Asami Tsuzuki	Christina Craven	Melyssa Searcy
Greg Madison	Nick Spangler	Greg Thornton	Shane Long	Andrew Gardiner	David Villa
Murray Steinberg	Chip Zien	Ken Goth	Bob Russell	Peter Robson	Bob Russell
George Howard	Michael X. Martin	Michael Saddington	Billy Brisley	John Bruce	Mark Dacey
Albert	Edward Hibbert	Atha Kastanias	Jason Tamashausky	Malachi Reid	Joseph Pierone
Aunt Sheila / Mimsy	Anne L. Nathan	Julia Brovedani	Ginny S. Crooks	Rowan Hall	Michelle Ward / Sam Szentmik
Uncle Morty / Walt	Adam Heller	Graeme Halliday	Karl Loveland	Jack Bruce	Matt Cavallo / Anthony Finke

== Awards and nominations ==
Year	Award	Category	Nominee	Result	Ref.
2015	Clarence Derwent Award	Most Promising Male Actor	Josh Grisetti	Won	
2015	Outer Critics Circle Award	Outstanding New Broadway Musical		Nominated	
2015	Outer Critics Circle Award	Outstanding Book of a Musical	Brian Hargrove	Nominated	
2015	Outer Critics Circle Award	Outstanding New Score	Brian Hargrove and Barbara Anselmi	Nominated	
2015	Outer Critics Circle Award	Outstanding Director of a Musical	David Hyde Pierce	Nominated	
2015	Outer Critics Circle Award	Outstanding Actress in a Musical	Tyne Daly	Nominated	
2015	Outer Critics Circle Award	Outstanding Featured Actor in a Musical	Josh Grisetti	Nominated	
2015	Drama League Award	Outstanding Production of a Musical		Nominated	
2015	Drama League Award	Distinguished Performance	Tyne Daly	Nominated	
2015	Drama League Award	Distinguished Performance	Lisa Howard	Nominated	
2015	Drama Desk Award	Outstanding Actress in a Musical	Lisa Howard	Nominated	
2015	Drama Desk Award	Outstanding Featured Actor in a Musical	Josh Grisetti	Nominated	
2015	Drama Desk Award	Outstanding Featured Actress in a Musical	Tyne Daly	Nominated	
