= West Indian Girl (album) =

Studio album by West Indian Girl
- Released: August 24, 2004
- Genre: Dream pop; psychedelic rock
- Label: Astralwerks
- Producer: Robert James & Francis Ten (Add'l)

West Indian Girl chronology
West Indian Girl (2004)	4th & Wall (2007)

Professional ratings
Review scores
Source	Rating
AllMusic	2/5 stars
La Opinión	3/4 stars

West Indian Girl is an album by West Indian Girl, released in 2004.

== Critical reception ==
Exclaim! wrote that "the one thing that [the band] succeed in doing well is creating music that seems to diffuse through a druggy haze, thanks to their dreamy pseudo-psychedelic sound that wouldn't have been out of place back in days of the Madchester."

== Track listing ==
- Written by West Indian Girl

No.	Title	Length
1.	"Trip"	4:21
2.	"What Are You Afraid Of"	5:09
3.	"Hollywood"	4:56
4.	"Miles From Monterey"	3:19
5.	"Dream"	4:41
6.	"Northern Sky"	4:11
7.	"Visions"	1:37
8.	"Still Lost"	4:41
9.	"Leave Tonight"	3:17
10.	"Green"	4:38
11.	"Lay Down"	4:38

== Personnel ==
- Chris Carter - keyboards
- Mariqueen Maandig - vocals
- Mark Lewis - drums
- Robert James - Producer
- Francis Ten - Additional Producer
- Michael H. Brauner - Mixing Engineer
- George Marino - Mastering Engineer
- John Burke - Drums (on 'Trip')
- Wayne Faler - Additional Guitar (on 'Trip')
- Steve Utstein - Additional Keys, Cello
