= Enter Laughing (film) =

1967 film by Carl Reiner

- VHS cover
- Directed by: Carl Reiner
- Screenplay by: Carl Reiner; Joseph Stein
- Based on: Enter Laughing (novel) by Carl Reiner; Enter Laughing (play) by Joseph Stein
- Produced by: Carl Reiner; Joseph Stein
- Starring: José Ferrer; Shelley Winters; Elaine May; Jack Gilford; Janet Margolin; David Opatoshu; Michael J. Pollard; Don Rickles; Richard Deacon; Reni Santoni
- Cinematography: Joseph F. Biroc
- Edited by: Charles Nelson
- Music by: Quincy Jones
- Production company: Acre Enterprises
- Distributed by: Columbia Pictures
- Release date: February 25, 1967
- Running time: 111 minutes
- Country: United States
- Language: English

Enter Laughing is a 1967 American comedy film, directed by Carl Reiner, based on his autobiographical novel and the 1963 stage play of the same name. It was Reiner's directorial debut.

The film stars newcomer Reni Santoni, Elaine May, Jose Ferrer, Shelley Winters, Jack Gilford and Janet Margolin. It tells the story of David Kolowitz, a young Jewish man from The Bronx trying to break into the theater and launch a career in acting.

The film has never been released on DVD or Blu-Ray.

== Plot ==
David Kolowitz works as a delivery boy and assistant for a machine shop in New York City in 1938, and is fascinated with the movies. Despite the misgivings of his girlfriend Wanda, his parents Morris and Emma, and his employer Mr. Foreman, David follows the suggestion of his friend Marvin and becomes involved with an Off-Broadway theater company run by Harrison B. Marlowe. He admires Ronald Colman so he uses the stage name "Donald Colman".

It is a margin operation that requires him to pay $5 a week for "tuition". Marlowe's daughter Angela takes a romantic interest in David, who perseveres despite a lack of acting talent and the hostility of Marlowe. Overcoming all the difficulties, he makes his acting debut and Morris, Emma and Wanda accept his new interest. In the end Angela waives David's tuition fee, allowing him to "act for nothing".

== Cast ==
- Reni Santoni as David Kolowitz
- Elaine May as Angela Marlowe
- José Ferrer as Harrison B. Marlowe
- Shelley Winters as Emma Kolowitz
- Jack Gilford as Mr. Foreman
- Janet Margolin as Wanda
- David Opatoshu as Morris Kolowitz
- Don Rickles as Harry Hamburger
- Michael J. Pollard as Marvin
- Richard Deacon as Pike
- Nancy Kovack as Miss B
- Herbie Faye as Mr. Schoenbaum
- Rob Reiner as Clark Baxter
- Danny Stein as Spencer Reynolds
- Milton Frome as Policeman
- Lillian Adams as Theatergoer
- Mantan Moreland as Subway Rider
- Patrick Campbell as Butler
- Peter Brocco as Lawyer Peabody

== Musical score and soundtrack ==
Enter Laughing

Soundtrack album by Quincy Jones
- Released: February 25, 1967
- Recorded: 1967
- Genre: Film score
- Length: 24:31
- Label: Liberty; LOM-16004/LOS-17004
- Producer: Jack Tracy, Dick Pierce

Quincy Jones chronology
The Deadly Affair (1967)	Enter Laughing (1967)	In the Heat of the Night (1967)

The film score was composed, arranged and conducted by Quincy Jones, and the soundtrack album was released on the Liberty label in 1967.

=== Track listing ===
All compositions by Quincy Jones except where noted

1. "Enter Laughing" (Lyrics by Mack David) − 2:30
2. "Exit Crying" − 2:27
3. "Pennies from Heaven" (Arthur Johnston, Johnny Burke) − 2:27
4. "David Dooze It" − 2:19
5. "Main Title (Enter Laughing)" − 2:34
6. "Enter Laughing" − 4:05
7. "Ha-Cha-Cha" (Jerome Kern, Otto Harbach) − 2:17
8. "Vienna Wails" − 2:15
9. "I Hear You Calling" − 1:55
10. "Enter Laughing (End Title)" (Lyrics by Mack David) − 1:42

=== Personnel ===
- Unidentified orchestra arranged and conducted by Quincy Jones including
  - Mel Carter (tracks 1 & 10), Carl Reiner (tracks 3 & 7) − vocals

== See also ==
- List of American films of 1967
