= Lisa Howard (American actress, born 1975) =

American actress and singer (born 1975)

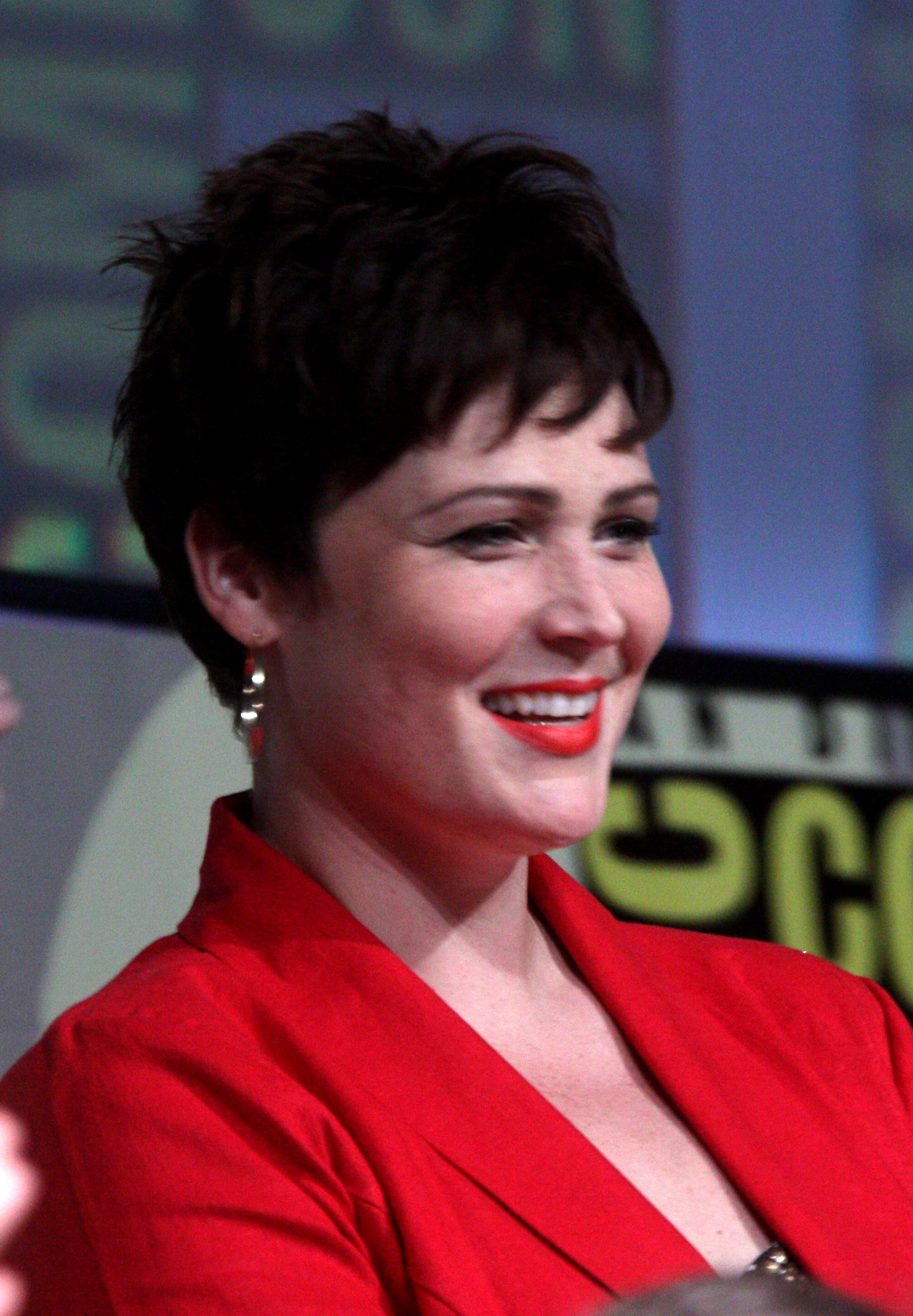
- Lisa Howard at the 2012 San Diego Comic-Con
- Born: 1975 (age 50–51); Akron, Ohio
- Education: University of Cincinnati CCM (BFA)
- Occupation: Actress
- Years active: 2003–present

Lisa Howard is an American actress and singer. Howard is most known for playing Siobhan in The Twilight Saga: Breaking Dawn – Part 2 and Rona Lisa Peretti in The 25th Annual Putnam County Spelling Bee. Spelling Bee went on to win many awards, including the Drama Desk Award for Best Ensemble. She created the character of Jenny in the new Broadway musical It Shoulda Been You, receiving a nomination for the 2015 Drama Desk Award for Outstanding Actress in a Musical.

== Early life ==
Howard was raised in Akron, Ohio, and graduated from Firestone High School. She played softball, soccer, volleyball, and a little basketball in her youth. She went on to graduate from University of Cincinnati – College-Conservatory of Music with a BFA in musical theatre.

== TV and film ==
In 2009, she appeared in the TV series Ugly Betty in the episode Plus None as Dominatrix. In 2012, she was cast as Siobhan, a member of an Irish coven, in The Twilight Saga: Breaking Dawn – Part 2.

=== Covita ===
On October 6, 2020, the Lincoln Project released a video called Covita a parody of Evita criticizing Donald Trump for failing to protect staff from the COVID-19 pandemic. Lisa Howard sang the vocals for this video.

== Stage roles ==
Howard originated the role of Jenny Steinberg in the Broadway production of David Hyde Pierce-directed It Shoulda Been You. Howard played the older sister of a Jewish bride, played by Sierra Boggess, whose wedding with David Burtka's character is disrupted when her ex-boyfriend shows up at the wedding. Additional cast members included Tyne Daly and Harriet Harris. For her performance, Howard was nominated for the 2015 Drama Desk Award for Outstanding Actress in a Musical. Playbill Online named her performance of Jenny's Blues at the 2015 Tony Awards one of the show's "greatest moments," and Rolling Stone called it one of the ceremony's best moments.

=== Broadway ===
- The 25th Annual Putnam County Spelling Bee (2005) – Rona Lisa Peretti
- South Pacific (2008) – Lt. Genevieve Marshall/Ensemble
- 9 to 5 (2009) – Missy/Ensemble
- Priscilla, Queen of the Desert (2011) – Diva/Ensemble (replacement)
- It Shoulda Been You (2015) – Jenny Steinberg (April 14 – August 9, 2015)
- Escape to Margaritaville (2018) – Tammy

=== Off-Broadway ===
- The 25th Annual Putnam County Spelling Bee (2005) – Rona Lisa Peretti
- Silence! The Musical (2005) – Catherine Martin
- Sunday in the Park with George (2016) – Nurse
- Titanique (2024) – The Unsinkable Molly Brown

=== Regional/National tours ===
- Cinderella (St. Louis MUNY, 2003) – Stepsister
- The Gift of the Magi (Olney Theatre Center, 2003) – City Her
- The 25th Annual Putnam County Spelling Bee (Barrington Stage Company, 2004) – Rona Janet
- Les Miserables (St. Louis MUNY, 2007) – Madame Thénadier
- Emmet Otter's Jug-Band Christmas (Goodspeed Opera House, 2008) – Mrs. Gretchen Fox
- 9 to 5 (Ahmanson Theatre, 2008) – Missy/Ensemble
- Jim Henson's Emmet Otter (Goodspeed Opera House, 2009) – Mrs. Gretchen Fox
- Legally Blonde (St. Louis MUNY, 2011) – Paulette
- The Sound of Music (Pittsburgh CLO, 2011)
- It Shoulda Been You (George Street Playhouse, 2011) – Jenny Steinberg
- Wicked (Munchkinland Tour, 2022) – Madame Morrible
- Into the Woods (Guthrie Theater, 2023) – Witch
- 42 Balloons (Chicago Shakespeare Theater, 2025) - Margaret Van Deusen
