= Charles Gaynor =

American musical composer

Charles Beauclerk Gaynor (born April 3, 1907, Boston, Massachusetts – December 18, 1975, Washington, D.C.) was an American musical composer. His revues include Lend an Ear (1948) and Show Girl (1961), and he contributed songs to the 1973 revival of Irene, and the London production Sweeter and Lower.

Gene Kelly had his first position as a choreographer with the Charles Gaynor musical revue Hold Your Hats at the Pittsburgh Playhouse in April 1938.
