= Enter Laughing =

1963 play by Joseph Stein

Enter Laughing is a 1963 play by Joseph Stein.

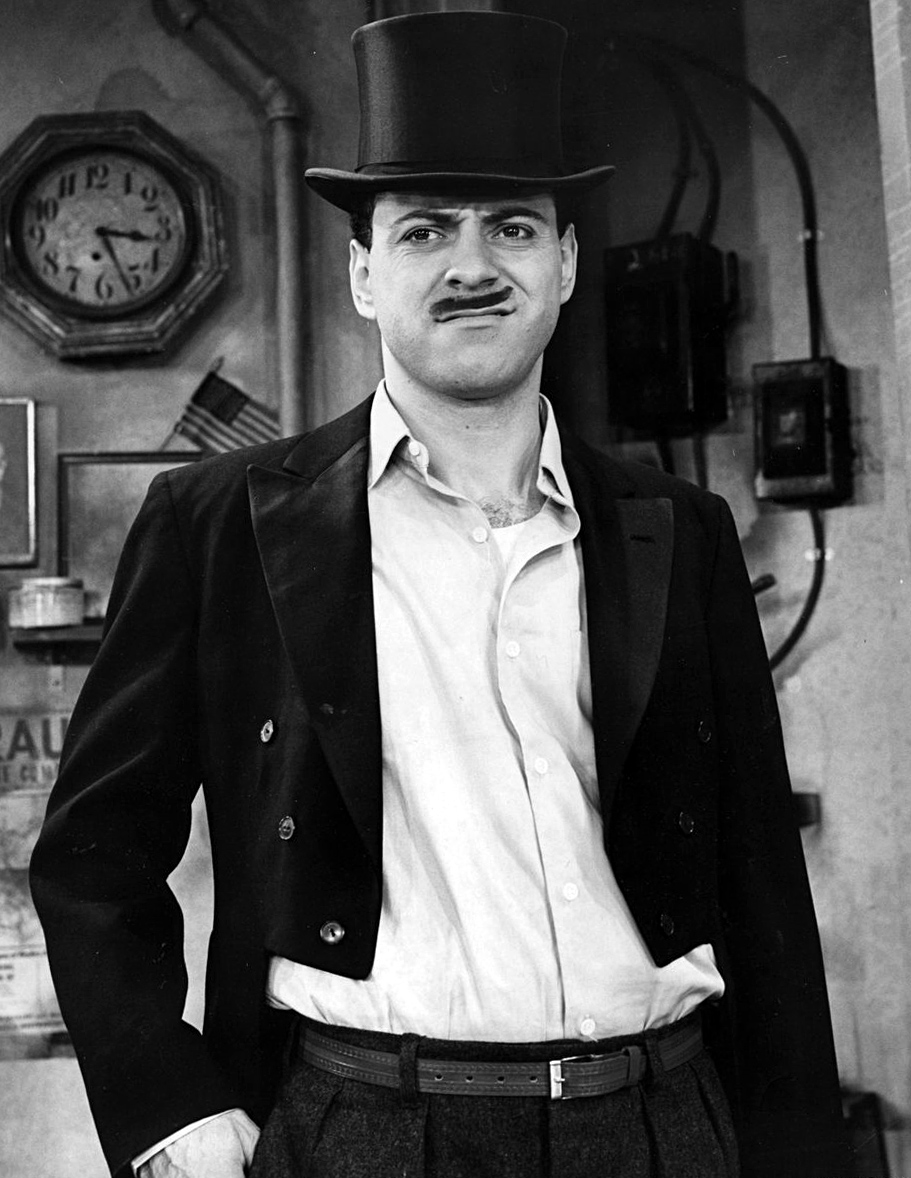
Alan Arkin as David Kolowitz

A farce in two acts, it is based on the semi-autobiographical novel by Carl Reiner. The action centers on the journey of young aspiring actor David Kolowitz as he tries to extricate himself from overly protective parents (who want him to be a married pharmacist) and two too many girlfriends, while struggling to meet the challenge of his lack of talent in 1930s New York City.

The Broadway production opened on March 13, 1963, and ran for over a year. It marked the Broadway directorial debut of Gene Saks. The cast included Alan Arkin, Vivian Blaine, Sylvia Sidney, Michael J. Pollard, and Alan Mowbray. Arkin won a Tony for his performance.

== Original cast ==
In order of appearance:

- Irving Jacobson as Mr. Foreman
- Alan Arkin as David Kolowitz
- Michael J. Pollard as Marvin
- Meg Myles as Miss B.
- Charles Randall as Pike
- Pierre Epstein as Don Baxter
- Walt Wanderman as Don Darwin
- Alan Mowbray as Marlowe
- Vivian Blaine as Angela
- Sylvia Sidney as Mother
- Marty Greene as Father
- Barbara Dana as Wanda
- Shimen Ruskin as Waiter
- Monroe Arnold as Roger
- Tom Gorman as Lawyer

== Reception ==
Enter Laughing opened March 13, 1963 at Henry Miller's Theatre and ran through March 14, 1964, for 419 performances. It was well received by critics and audiences. Howard Taubman wrote in the New York Times review that "the major complaint ... is that it doesn't provide enough rest periods between side-splitting laughs" and called Arkin's performance "a choice specimen of a shrewd actor ribbing his profession". In The Nation, Harold Clurman called it an example of how the "deterioration of the Broadway theatre may be discerned in the fact that inconsequential scripts are frequently done more competently than serious ones"; Clurman, too, singled out Arkin for praise.

Arkin won both the Tony Award for Best Featured Actor in a Play and the Theatre World Award for his performance.

== Adaptations ==
Reiner co-wrote the screenplay with Stein for the 1967 film version, directed by Reiner and starring Reni Santoni as David, José Ferrer as Marlowe, Shelley Winters as Mrs. Kolowitz, and Elaine May as Angela.

The play served as the basis for the ill-fated 1976 musical So Long, 174th Street.

Enter Laughing was revived Off-Broadway as a musical in 2008 by The York Theatre Company. With music and lyrics by Stan Daniels, the production starred Josh Grisetti for a limited run. The New York Times praised the revival as "hilarious" and Variety reviewer Steven Suskin wrote that "portions bordered on the hysterical". Like Arkin in 1963, Grisetti won the 2009 Theatre World Award for his performance.

Enter Laughing: The Musical was revived again Off-Broadway by The York Theatre Company in 2019; running from May 7, 2019, to June 23, 2019. The 2019 revival featured: Raji Ahsan, Farah Alvin, Dana Costello, Ray DeMattis, Chris Dwan, Alison Fraser, Magnes Jarmo, Michael Kostroff, Paul Kreppel, Robert Picardo, Nathan Salstone, David Schramm, Allie Trimm and Joe Veale.
