= Lend an Ear =

- Original theatre program
- Music: Charles Gaynor
- Lyrics: Charles Gaynor
- Book: Charles Gaynor; Joseph Stein and Will Glickman, additional sketches
- Productions: 1948 Broadway; 1959 Off-Broadway revival

Lend an Ear is a musical revue with a book, music, and lyrics by Charles Gaynor and additional sketches by Joseph Stein and Will Glickman.

== Productions ==
=== Background ===
Lend an Ear was commissioned by Frederick Burleigh, and played as a small revue in April 1941 in Pittsburgh, Pennsylvania, at the Pittsburgh Playhouse, directed by Burleigh with the performers from Carnegie Tech and in a "straw hat" theatre, but plans to produce the show in New York ended. After World War II ended, it was decided to proceed with the revue, and it began rehearsals in May 1948 in Los Angeles, California. Gower Champion became involved and went from advisor to choreographer to being credited as "Dances and Musical Numbers Staged by..." Lend an Ear premiered at the Las Palmas Theatre, Los Angeles, on June 14, 1948. Rehearsals for a New York opening began on July 26, 1948, at the Coronet Theatre (now the Eugene O'Neill Theatre). The show went to Boston for its tryout, opening at the Majestic Theatre in August 1948.

=== Broadway ===
Lend an Ear opened on Broadway on December 16, 1948, at the National Theatre and moved three times before closing on January 21, 1950, after 460 performances. After the National Theatre, the show ran at the Broadhurst Theatre from February 21, 1949, to October 8, 1949, then the Shubert Theatre from October 10, 1949, to October 29, 1949, and finally the Mansfield Theatre from October 31, 1949, to January 21, 1950. Playbill.com noted that "The brilliant revue 'Lend an Ear' moved in [to the Brooks Atkinson Theatre (Broadway)] from another theatre in 1949 and played for three months."

Directed by Hal Gerson, with musical staging by Gower Champion and assistant to the choreographer Marge Champion; the costumes, setting and lighting were by Raoul Pene DuBois. The cast featured Carol Channing, Yvonne Adair, Jennie Lou Law, Gloria Hamilton, Gene Nelson, Bob Scheerer, and William Eythe. Channing, Nelson, and Scheerer won the Theatre World Award, and Gower Champion won the Tony Award for Best Choreography.

The musical gave Carol Channing her break "where the wide-eyed beauty displayed her fabulous comic talents and vocal abilities". This led to her being cast, the following year, in Gentlemen Prefer Blondes.

No cast album was made.

=== Revival ===
A revival was produced Off-Broadway at the Renata Theatre by Steven Slane and Jenny Lou Law in September 1959, with direction by Law and choreography by Bill Hooks. The cast featured Elizabeth Allen, Charles Nelson Reilly, and June Squibb.

== Revue sketches and songs overview ==
The sketch topics included psychoanalysts, gossip columnists, Santo Domingo as seen by a tourist, silent screen stars, a poor opera company that has no orchestra, and "The Gladiola Girl". The most famous sketch was the first act finale, "The Missing Road Company", featuring an imaginary lost touring troupe of the 1925 musical hit The Gladiola Girl, which was a spoof of 1920s musicals. In the sketch "Friday Dancing Class" a young man's (Gene Nelson) mother makes him go to a dance class; when he misbehaves and is forced to dance alone, he is saved by one of the young ladies. Channing played "such diverse characters as a French movie star, a British Christian Scientist, and 1920s flapper."

Songs included "Who Hit Me?", "Neurotic you and psychopathic me", "Where Is the She for Me?", "Give Your Heart a Chance to Sing", "Doin' the Old Yahoo Step", and "Molly O'Reilly".

=== The sketches and songs ===
Act 1

- After Hours – The Company
- Give Your Heart a Chance to Sing – Dorothy Babbs (The Girl); Robert Dixon, Arthur Maxwell, Bob Hergert, Tommy Morton, Bob Scheerer (The Boys)
- Neurotic You and Psychopathic Me – Lee Stacy (The Nurse), Anne Renee Anderson (The Patient), William Eythe (The Doctor)
- I'm Not in Love – Arthur Maxwell (The Boss Who Dictates); Yvonne Adair (The Secretary Who Sings); Gene Nelson, Tommy Morton, Bob Scheerer (The Bosses Who Dance)
- Do It Yourself – William Eythe, Al Checco, Jenny Lou Law, Hal Hackett
- Friday Dancing Class – Gene Nelson and Company
- Ballade – Anne Renee Anderson
- When Someone You Love Loves You – Sung by: Gloria Hamilton and Robert Dixon; Danced by: Antoinette Guhlke and Gene Nelson
- The Missing Road Company (The Gladiola Girl) – William Eythe (Announcer) and Company

Act 2

- Santo Domingo – Arthur Maxwell (Travel Agent), Yvonne Adair (The Tourist), The company (Santo Domingans)
- I'm On the Lookout – Gloria Hamilton
- Three Little Queens of the Silver Screen – Lee Stacy, Anne Renee Anderson, Carol Channing
- Molly O'Reilly – Dancers: Bob Scheerer, Dorothy Babbs; Sung by: Jenine Smith, Gloria Hamilton, Beverly Hosier, Robert Dixon, Arthur Maxwell, Larry Stewart
- All the World's – Arthur Maxwell (Announcer), William Eythe (Mr. Playgoer), Carol Channing (Mrs. Playgoer), George Hall (A Bartender)
- Who Hit Me? – Sung by: Yvonne Adair; Danced by: Gene Nelson
- Words Without Song – Arthur Maxwell, Carol Channing, Anne Renee Anderson, George Hall, William Eythe and Chorus
- Finale

== Response ==
Brooks Atkinson, in his New York Times review, wrote that "Gaynor's intimate musical is a model of skill and taste in this style of fooling, and it is performed by some fresh-grown youngsters whose talents have not been corrupted yet...He is lightly satirizing some of the more palatable follies of the day, and he is so neat in his touch that he does not have to clever…At the end of the first act Mr. Gaynor offers a very funny burlesque of old-time musical comedy—'The Gladiola Girl'."

According to Playbill.com, "In December 1948, a delirious revue, 'Lend an Ear,' entirely written by Charles Gaynor, set the town on its ear. Carol Channing was an overnight success as a loony, wide-eyed blonde in such numbers as 'The Gladiola Girl' and 'Opera Without Music,' and Yvonne Adair, William Eythe, Gene Nelson, and the rest of the cast made this one of the theatre's best revues of all time."

== Television ==
Excerpts of the musical appeared on the first episode of the CBS Television series Tonight on Broadway in 1948. Highlights of the revue were recreated for the October 28, 1954 broadcast of the CBS monthly variety series Shower of Stars.
