= The Slants =

Rock band and nonprofit organization

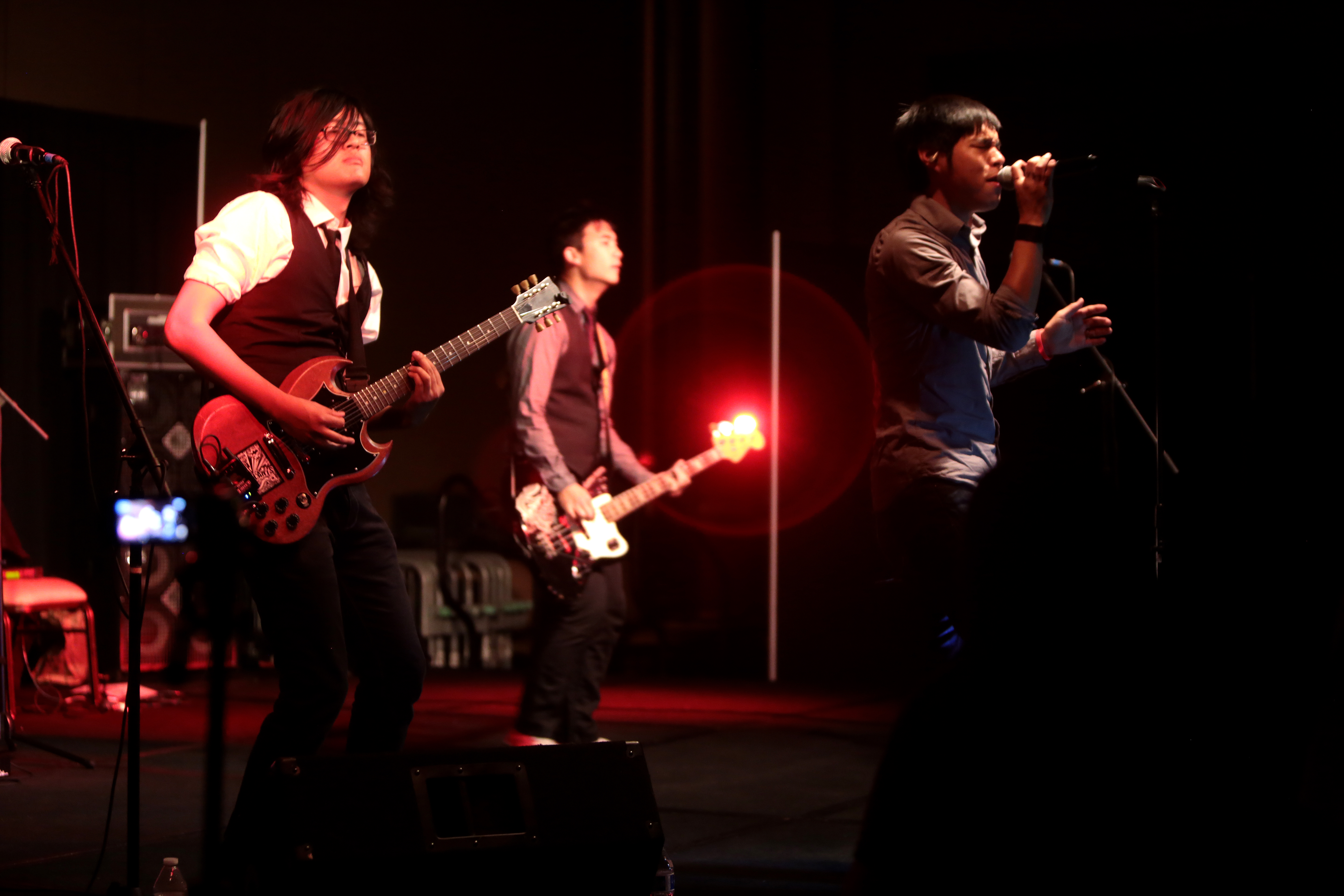
- The Slants performing in September 2016.

Background information
- Also known as: Slants
- Origin: Portland, Oregon, U.S.
- Genres: Rock; dance-rock; synthpop; electroclash
- Years active: 2006–present
- Label: Independent
- Members: Simon "Young" Tam; Joe X. Jiang
- Website: www.theslants.com

The Slants are an American dance-rock band composed entirely of Asian Americans. The band was formed in Portland, Oregon, by Simon Tam in 2006. The band went through a number of early lineup changes, but had a core lineup for its albums and tours by 2009 consisting of Aron Moxley (vocals), Tam (bass, keys), Jonathan Fontanilla (guitar), and Tyler Chen (drums, backing vocals). After experiencing some transitions, the core lineup consisted of Tam, lead singer Ken Shima, and guitarist Joe X. Jiang by 2015, until the band retired from touring in 2019. The band's name originates from an effort of reappropriation and was the source of a protracted legal battle that took them to the Supreme Court of the United States in the case Matal v. Tam.

Influenced by 1980s bands such as Depeche Mode and New Order, as well as modern acts such as the Killers and the Bravery, the Slants refer to their sound as "Chinatown Dance Rock". The band have released five studio albums, two EPs, and a feature-length film, The Slants - Taiwan Tour. The group performed across four continents, including special tours with the Armed Forces and performing at Taiwan's Spring Scream festival.

The Slants are deeply involved with the Asian American community and racial justice work. This includes raising money for causes such as funding research into disparate rates of cancer for Asian American women, bridging divides, fighting bullying, and building community centers. In 2018, members of the band launched their own nonprofit organization (The Slants Foundation) to support other artist-activists working to address racial inequities.

In late 2019, the band took an indefinite hiatus from live touring to primarily focus. In 2023, they released their final record, The Band Plays On. The two members, Simon Tam and Joe X. Jiang, still continues to compose music and occasionally perform with former bandmates, but only for special events to raise money for charitable causes. Several of the former band members serve as volunteers for The Slants Foundation, though the organization operates independently of the band.

== Formation and name ==
The band was originally formed after posting ads to local classifieds, Craigslist and online ads. The process took two years to finalize the initial line-up. Over the years, the lineup has evolved with different members stepping into the role, all with the common thread of identifying with Asian American culture.

Speaking on the band's name and the sources from which it was derived, founder/bassist Simon Tam stated that, "['The Slants'] sounds like a fun, '80s, New Wave-kind of band. And it's a play on words. We can share our personal experiences about what it's like being people of color—our own slant on life, if you will. It's also a musical reference. There are slant guitar chords that we use in our music." The band's name also serves as a reference to the band members' ethnic identity (see epicanthic fold).

=== Supreme Court case ===
Due to the connection between the Slants' name and the use of "slant" as a pejorative in relation to Asian people, the group's efforts to register the name as a trademark were the subject of a protracted legal debate. After the band's request to register their trademark was first denied in 2010, they unsuccessfully appealed to the Trademark Trial and Appeal Board. In December 2015, the United States Court of Appeals for the Federal Circuit overturned a previous ruling that upheld the United States Patent and Trademark Office's rejection of the band's application by striking down part of a law that allowed the government to reject trademarks it deemed offensive or disparaging to others. The majority opinion stated, in part, that "[w]hatever our personal feelings about the mark at issue here, or other disparaging marks, the First Amendment forbids government regulators to deny registration because they find speech likely to offend others." The case was later heard by the Supreme Court of the United States in Matal v. Tam, who ruled unanimously in the band's favor. Tam explained that while the First Amendment should protect the band's right to use the name regardless of their reasons, they had chosen the name in order "to undercut slurs about Asian-Americans that band members heard in childhood, not to promote them."

In 2019, Washington University in St. Louis published an extensive study on reclaiming identities based on the Slants' name and found that, "Reappropriation does seem to work in the sense of defusing insults, rendering them less disparaging and harmful". That same year, trademark law expert Elizabeth Squires wrote that, "Simon Tam's successful attempt to infuse meaning into a term by trademarking it was brilliant. He and other newly minted trademark holders have been unleashed to kick-start a new era of free speech and cultural reclamation, where we as market participants have a voice. Now, more than ever, what we have to say and what the market thinks matters. Society should take note from The Slants® and we should be sure to speak loud enough and proud enough for the lexicographers to hear."

Studies conducted after the court case have also affirmed that the Slants' efforts in reappropriation was helpful in neutralizing disparaging words. Researchers have noted that, "When a group is seen as taking control of a historically disparaging term, it can indeed neutralize the insulting content of the term...and it does so among the group that is the target of the insult, as well as among members of the majority group. Reappropriation does seem to work in the sense of defusing insults, rendering them less disparaging and harmful".

== Musical style ==
The Slants describe themselves as "Chinatown Dance Rock" and plays synth-pop music similar to groups such as CHVRCHES and I AM X while incorporating some rock sounds like Bleachers and The Killers. Their influences include 1980s groups such as Depeche Mode, The Cure, Duran Duran, and Joy Division.

The band has been grouped with various genres, including alternative rock, indie rock, new wave, synth-pop, and pop rock.

== History ==
=== 2006–2009: Slanted Eyes, Slanted Hearts ===
The Slants were founded in Portland, OR by Simon Tam in 2006. Within a few months of their first show, the band released their debut album, Slanted Eyes, Slanted Hearts. The album was listed in the top 5 Asian-American albums of 2007 by AsiaXpress and has won accolades such as "Album of the Year" from the Portland Music Awards, Willamette Week, RockWired, and others. The Slants were cited as the "Hardest Working Asian American Band" The Slants were named the world's first Asian American Fender Music spotlight artist.

In 2008, the Slants competed in Bodog Music Battle of the Bands for the opportunity to be featured on the Fuse TV reality show and win a $1 million recording contract. The band consistently placed first in every round of the competition. However, when they learned that they would be required to sign a 73-page non-negotiable contract in order to continue the competition, they dropped out. The band reasoned: "This was just not the right fit for our band at this time – or any band, really." This was one of several recording contracts that the band rejected. That same year, founder Simon Tam rejected a $4 million recording contract who wanted to replace the lead singer with someone who was white. The following year, the Slants were featured in a SXSW showcase and launched several more tours spanning North America.

During this time, the band shed several of its short-term members, including both on-stage keyboardists, and solidified its lineup with Tyler Chen (drums) joining original members Simon Tam (bass), Aron Moxley (vocals), and Jonathan Fontanilla (guitar). They also were becoming a fan-favorite due to frequent appearances at anime conventions, with NPR writing that, "The Slants' songs about Asian-American alienation don't seem to have hurt their appeal to white teenagers. If anything, they resonate with kids whose geeky adoration for anime makes them outsiders in their own way."

=== 2009: Slants! Slants! Revolution ===
In 2009, the band released a collection of Dance Dance Revolution-styled remixes of their debut album, Slanted Eyes, Slanted Hearts, called Slants! Slants! Revolution and donated 100% of the profits to cancer research for Asian women because they experience higher rates of cancer than any other ethnic group. The production of the remixes was led by former band member Michael "Gaijin" Pacheco and Justin Cooper (under the name Son of Rust).

=== 2010–2012: Pageantry ===
In 2010, the Slants released their third album, Pageantry. Pageantry featured a number of local icons including Cory Gray (The Decemberists), Krista Herring, Mic Crenshaw, and Gabe Kniffin (Silversafe). Thai Dao also joined the band as keyboardist and guitarist after the release of the album. From Pageantry, the band released two music videos, including "How the Wicked Live" and "You Make Me Alive." During this time, the band was also advised to register their name as a trademark. However, the application was rejected under Section 2A of the Lanham Act, under the claim that the band's name was disparaging to persons of Asian descent. The band appealed.

In 2011, the Slants were featured on the front page of the Oregonian for fighting the United States Patent and Trademark Office over the right to protect their name. Despite several appeals, the Trademark Office continued to refuse registration. That same year, The Slants was added to the Armed Forces Entertainment roster and invited to perform for active troops serving overseas.

The band's extensive touring led to them sharing the stage with acts such as apl.de.ap (of The Black Eyed Peas), Vampire Weekend, Girl Talk, Girugamesh, M.O.V.E and Boom Boom Satellites.

=== 2012–2014: The Yellow album ===
After returning their European tour, the Slants returned to the studio to write and record The Yellow Album (2012). The album was recorded and engineered by Simon Tam (House of the Rising Sun), Tyler Chen (Chen Mountain Studios), and Scott Craig (Ripcord Studios). It was mastered by Adam Gonsalves (Telegraph Mastering).

The Yellow Album featured several singles and the band greatly expanded their collection of music videos at this time. This included music videos for the songs "Love Letters From Andromeda" and "Misery" as a collaboration with films Tai Chi Zero and Tai Chi Hero, starring Tony Leung, angelababy, and action choreography by Sammo Hung. The band also debuted their video for "Just One Kiss" on Conan O'Brien's Team Coco, filmed at Otakon.

Following multiple national tours in support of The Yellow Album, longtime members Fontanilla (guitar) and Moxley (vocals) left the band. Will Moore of The Adarna stepped in as lead guitarist and occasional vocalist during this time.

=== 2014–2017: Something Slanted This Way Comes ===
Ken Shima joined the band as lead singer, replacing vocalist Aron Moxley, in 2014. Shortly after, Joe X. Jiang became the band's guitarist, with Dao and Moore stepping down from the role. The band quickly organized a national tour, called "Slantsgiving" to introduce Shima and Jiang to fans and to promote their upcoming album release and a new smartphone designed by Neoix. The band released Something Slanted This Way Comes, a compilation album of their previous hits re-recorded featuring the vocals of new lead singer Ken Shima. Power of Pop described it as "Parlaying a dynamic affinity for 80s synth-pop/new wave, the Slants combine danceable rhythms with catchy pop tunes that immediately grab the listener's attention. Lyrically, the band highlight their Asian roots and provide a rare insight that other bands might not be equipped for."

During this time, the band also continued appealing for their trademark registration and eventually argued in front of the United States Court of Appeals for the Federal Circuit with support from the American Civil Liberties Union. On December 22, 2015, the United States Court of Appeals for the Federal Circuit ruled in favor of the Slants, striking down a portion of Section 2A of the Lanham Act as unconstitutional. The United States Patent and Trademark Office appealed to the Supreme Court, which agreed to hear the case.

In 2016, the band worked with Rukus Avenue in collaboration with the White House Initiative on Asian Americans and Pacific Islanders to release a song in support the #ActToChange anti-bullying movement. The song, From the Heart, made headlines for speaking directly to the Trademark Office's oppressive actions that eventually led the band before the Supreme Court. During this time, longtime drummer Chen retired from the band to move to Seattle, WA. The band recruited Yuya Matsuda as a temporary replacement and began working on a new record.

=== 2017–2019: The Band Who Must Not Be Named EP ===
On 11 January 2017, the band released The Band Who Must Not Be Named, one week before their appearance at the Supreme Court. The title is a "jab at the Trademark Office" from "the anti-racist band that the government calls racist". For this release, the band worked with Track Town Records in Jiang's hometown of Eugene, Oregon. The EP's main single, a fully completed version of the song "From the Heart," was quoted in multiple stories about the band's legal journey.

After returning from Washington, DC, the band launched an ambitious national tour, with over 70 appearances in 60 days, which included multiple speaking engagements by Simon Tam, sharing legal insights from their case at law schools, bar associations, and advocacy organizations.

On 19 June 2017, the Supreme Court unanimously ruled in the Slants' favor.

The band continued touring nationally using fill-in drummers, including Randy Bemrose of Radiation City. In 2018, they collaborated with WNYC Studios for a single called "18 21" to be included in a More Perfect series, joining the likes of Dolly Parton and Devendra Banhart.

=== 2019: The Slants EP ===
In 2019, the Slants released a self-titled EP, the final album featuring Ken Shima as lead singer of the group. That same year, the band started a nonprofit organization, The Slants Foundation to fund and mentor artists-activists of color, and eventually expanded their philanthropic efforts. The band announced an indefinite hiatus from touring.

On 2 and 4 November 2019, the band performed their final shows in Seattle, Washington, and Portland, Oregon. The shows featured nearly every former member of the band, including longtime vocalist, Aron Moxley. Shortly after, the Portland Monthly published a piece on the legacy of the Slants, saying, "Yes, they're the Trademark Band (sorry, guys). And yes, they're Chinatown dance rock. But after the lights fade from the walls of the Doug Fir Lounge, they're the band that hangs back to say hi. They're the band that signs [things for longtime fans] 10 years later."

=== 2023: The Band Plays On ===
In 2022, the Slants announced they were writing songs for a new and final record that would highlight other voices across their community. Joe and Simon wrote and composed the music, but most of the playing/singing would feature other AAPI artists, new and classic. In March 2023, they announced the album's title, The Band Plays On. On July 24, 2023, they announced the new album would be released Oct. 10, with 3 reunion release shows featuring special guests Bao Vo, Edson Choi, Surrija, Darro, and Krost.

== Activism and philanthropy ==
Since its origins, the Slants have been involved with social justice organizations across the country to bring more attention to issues pertaining to marginalized communities. On a local level, the band worked with groups like the Asian Pacific American Network of Oregon (APANO) to build a new community center, revitalize a neighborhood through economic prosperity initiatives, and voter registration campaigns. Internationally, the band helped raise money to rescue North Korean refugees through Liberty in Korea.

In 2009, they released a special remix album where 100% of profits were donated to help fund research on the disparities faced by Asian women in cancer research.

In 2011–2012, the band toured military bases for troops serving overseas to highlight diverse experiences shortly after the high-profile suicide of Danny Chen. In addition, they were invited by the Oregon State Penitentiary's Asian Club to perform for inmates. In 2017, they were invited to participate in President Barack Obama's Act to Change campaign by the White House Initiative on Asian Americans and Pacific Islanders to aid in the campaign against bullying. The compilation album released as a result ironically included the band's single, From The Heart, which served as an "open letter to the Trademark Office", released one month before the band appeared before the Supreme Court.

In 2019, the band released the single "Anthem" as to highlight issues of police brutality. The band gave the song free to anyone willing to donate to an organization working on issues of racial justice. They have also produced other music videos to highlight issues around social justice and civic engagement.

The Slants started their own nonprofit organization, The Slants Foundation, to provide mentoring and scholarships to aspiring artist–activists of color. It is a volunteer-driven organization that is working to create a community that is "dedicated to providing unique perspectives to social issues – their own 'slant' on the world."

During the COVID-19 pandemic in 2020, The Slants Foundation responded to the rise in attacks on the Asian American community and impact on the artists by funding projects that sought to create meaningful connections rooted in empathy. The "Countering Hate with Art" campaign helped fund numerous works in music, poetry, and film.

In 2021, members of the band helped launch CPOC Music, the first U.S-based music business conference for and by artists of color. Today, several former band members serve as volunteers and members of the board of directors for The Slants Foundation.
