= Oscar Hammerstein Award =

American arts award

The Oscar Hammerstein Award for Outstanding Achievement in Musical Theatre is named in honor of American lyricist and librettist Oscar Hammerstein, who helped shape American theater music through his collaborations with a number of different composers and writers. The award was created in 1988 by Janet Hayes Walker, the Founding Artistic Director of The York Theatre Company, and is presented with the endorsement of the Rodgers & Hammerstein Organization and the Hammerstein family. The Oscar Hammerstein Award Gala is the major annual fundraising event of The York, a mainstay of the Off-Broadway scene for 50 years.

Past recipients include Stephen Sondheim, Angela Lansbury, Betty Comden & Adolph Green, Harold Prince, Cy Coleman, Charles Strouse, Arthur Laurents, Jerry Herman, Stephen Schwartz, Peter Stone, David Merrick, John Kander & Fred Ebb, Terrence McNally, Sir Cameron Mackintosh, Carol Channing, Tony Walton, Joseph Stein, Thomas Meehan, Jerry Bock and Sheldon Harnick, Barbara Cook, Paul Gemignani, Alan Menken, Lynn Ahrens & Stephen Flaherty.

In December 2016, the 25th Oscar Hammerstein Award was presented to Joel Grey in a star-studded tribute evening.

In 2017, the 26th Oscar Hammerstein Award was presented to Tom Jones and Harvey Schmidt.

In 2018, the 27th Oscar Hammerstein Award was presented to award-winning director and choreographer Susan Stroman.

Andre De Shields became the 28th recipient of the award at a gala dinner on Nov. 11, 2019.

Richard Maltby Jr. and David Shire became the 29th recipient of the award at The Edison Ballroom on November 1, 2021.

Leslie Uggams was honored as the 30th recipient of the award at The Edison Rooftop on November 14, 2022.

Patti LuPone was honored as the 31st recipient of the award in 2023.

Bernadette Peters was honored as the 32nd recipient of the award in 2024.

Jerry Zaks was honored as the 33rd recipient of the award in 2025.
