= Mrs. Gibbons' Boys =

Mrs. Gibbons' Boys is a play by Joseph Stein and Will Glickman. The comedy centers on the mother of three delinquent boys.

Produced and directed by George Abbott, the Broadway production opened at the Music Box Theatre on May 4, 1949 and closed after five performances. The cast included Ray Walston.

The Bucks County Playhouse in New Hope, Pennsylvania staged the play with Walter Matthau and William Windom as part of its Summer 1955 season.

== Film and play ==
In 1962, Peter Blackmore and Max Varnel adapted it for a feature film. Mrs. Gibbons' Boys was released by the British Lion Film Corporation. The cast, directed by Varnel, included Kathleen Harrison, Lionel Jeffries, Diana Dors, David Lodge, Eric Pohlmann, and Milo O'Shea.

On November 19, 1957, a production of the play opened at the Theatre Royal Windsor. It was directed by Hugh Goldie, with settings designed by Hal Henshaw. The cast was as follows: Mary Kerridge as Myra Hood, Avice Landone as Mrs Mary Gibbons, Vivian Matalon as Rudy Gibbons, Malcolm Russell as Mr Rausch, David Kelly as Coles, Eric House as Lester MacMichaels, David Lander as Woodrow W. Grupp, Frederick Jaeger as Rodla Gibbons, Lee Montague as Francis X. Gibbons, George Margo as Ernie "Horse" Wagner, Muriel Ridley as Pearl.
