= Simon Tam =

American musician (born 1981)

- Also known as: Simon Young
- Born: Simon Shiao Tam; 1981 (age 44–45); San Diego, California, U.S.
- Occupations: Musician, author, educator, speaker
- Instruments: Bass, guitar, keyboards, vocals
- Labels: The Slants, In Music We Trust Records, Pacifiction Records, SBG Records, Boot to Head Records
- Formerly of: The Slants, The Stivs, Last Stop Tokyo, Rockaway Teens
- Website: simontam.org

Chinese name
- Traditional Chinese: 譚仕文
- Simplified Chinese: 谭仕文
Transcriptions
Standard Mandarin
- Hanyu Pinyin: tán shì wén

Simon Tam (born 1981) is an American author, musician and activist. Tam was the successful plaintiff in Matal v. Tam, a 2017 U.S. Supreme Court case that ruled that the government could not reject trademark registrations that may disparage people, institutions, or beliefs. He is the founder of the Slants, an Asian American dance-rock band.

== Early life and career ==
Simon Shiao Tam was born in 1981 in San Diego, California. His father was from Guangdong and his mother was from Taiwan. He was the middle child of three. Tam's household spoke Mandarin, Taiwanese, and Cantonese. Tam's parents opened a restaurant. Tam learned to play multiple instruments and preferred the bass guitar.

Tam recalls feeling othered for being Chinese. His elementary school counselors told his parents not to speak or teach Chinese to Tam. Tam was physically and emotionally bullied in school for being Chinese and Asian.

Tam attended Grossmont College, Mt. San Jacinto College, and University of California, Riverside, where he double-majored in philosophy and religious studies. In 2004, a few months before graduating, Tam dropped out of college and moved to Portland, Oregon to join The Stivs, a punk band.

== Career ==
=== The Slants ===
In 2004, Tam began to recruit musicians for an all-Asian American rock band. He was inspired by the positive presentation of ethnically Asian actors in film Kill Bill and wanted to see more in popular American music. This band eventually became the Slants. Tam says the band's name was chosen "as a way of seizing control of a racial slur, turning it on its head and draining its venom. It was also a respectful nod to Asian-Americans who had been using the epithet for decades.".

Tam played bass guitar for the band starting from 2006. The band performed and also until the band announced their end in 2019. In 2023, Tam joined the band for a new album and tour.

Tam and other band members support Asian American activism through art through the Slants Foundation, which was founded in 2019.

==== Matal v. Tam ====
In 2010, Tam applied to register the band's trademark. The United States Patent and Trademark Office (USPTO) denied the trademark on the grounds that the band's name was disparaging to persons of Asian descent. The USPTO cited UrbanDictionary.com to support its claim. Tam appealed the USPTO decision on the grounds that the term as reappropriated was not offensive, including testimonies from dictionary experts, national surveys, and letters from Asian American community leaders, but the Trademark Office remained steadfast in their refusal. In 2011, Tam filed a second application which was also rejected. Tam appealed the decision to the Trademark Trial and Appeal Board, arguing that the term was not disparaging and that the law forbidding registration of disparaging trademarks violated the First Amendment.

After losing the appeal in 2013, Tam appealed subsequently to the United States Court of Appeals for the Federal Circuit. Initially, a panel of the Court of Appeals ruled against Tam in 2015, but the full court vacated the ruling and reheard the case en banc to discuss the constitutionality. In 2015, the court ruled in a 9-to-3 vote that the law used by the USPTO violated the First Amendment. The USPTO appealed the decision to the Supreme Court. In 2017, the Supreme Court of the United States agreed and ruled unanimously in Tam's favor in Matal v. Tam.

In 2019, Tam joined hip-hop artists in filing an amicus brief in Jamal Knox v. Commonwealth of Pennsylvania. He also filed an amicus brief at the Supreme Court on behalf of Erik Brunetti in Iancu v. Brunetti, often known as the sister case to Matal v. Tam, which struck down the "scandalous" and "immoral" provisions of the Lanham Act.

=== Other ===
In 2014, Tam was the marketing director at the Oregon Environmental Council. In 2016, Tam opened a restaurant with his sister.

In 2017, Tam moved to Nashville, Tennessee.

In 2023, Tam and fellow Slants member Joe X. Jiang premiered "Slanted: An American Rock Opera" at the Opera Theatre of Saint Louis.

== Bibliography ==
=== Books ===
- How to Get Sponsorships and Endorsements (2012, PACE Publishing)
- Music Business Hacks: The Daily Habits of the Self-Made Musician (2014, PACE Publishing, ISBN 978-0-615-98015-7)
- Slanted: How an Asian American Troublemaker Took on the Supreme Court (2019, Troublemaker Press, ISBN 978-1733629102)

=== Essays and journals ===
- 2012: "A Slanted View" (Where Are You From?: An Anthology of Asian American Writing (Volume 1))
- 2015: "Trademark Offense" (Oregon Humanities magazine)
- 2017: "The Power on Repurposing a Slur" (2015, The New York Times)
- 2018: "Day of Judgement" (Oregon Humanities magazine)
- 2018: "First Amendment, Trademarks, and the Slants: Our Journey to the Supreme Court" (Buffalo Intellectual Property Law Journal)
- 2020: "What The Slants’ First Amendment Case at the Supreme Court Actually Won" (The Oxford Handbook of Music Law and Policy)

== Works cited ==
- Tam, Simon (2019). Slanted: How An Asian American Troublemaker Took on the Supreme Court. Troublemaker Press. ISBN 978-1-7336291-0-2 – via Hoopla.
