= York Theatre =

Off-Broadway theater in New York City

The York Theatre Company
- Interactive map of The York Theatre Company
- Address: Theatre at St. Jeans, 150 E. 76th St. New York City; United States
- Capacity: 204 Seats
- Type: Off-Broadway

Construction
- Opened: 1969
- Years active: 57 years

Website
- yorktheatre.org

The York Theatre Company is an Off-Broadway theatre company based on the Upper East Side of Manhattan in New York City. Established in 1969, The York is the only theater in New York City, and one of the few in the world, whose two-fold mission is to produce new musical works and rediscover musical works from the past. The York’s producing style has become its trademark. Its productions have won critical acclaim, a host of honors and awards, and a loyal audience.The York provides an environment for new artists to hone their craft, and for some of the masters of the musical theater’s Golden Age to take fresh looks at their classic works. A special Drama Desk Award was presented to the company in 2006 for its "vital contributions to theater by developing and producing new musicals," as well as an Outer Critics Circle Special Achievement Award for “50 years of producing new and classic musicals."

Founded by Janet Hayes Walker in 1969, The York has presented more than 970 full-scale musical productions. From 1997 to 2024, under the guidance of former Producing Artistic Director James Morgan, The York focused exclusively on musical theater: newer musicals in its mainstage Series (most of them world, American or New York premieres) and revivals in its popular Musicals in Mufti series of staged concert presentations.

From 1993 to 2020, the company performed at St. Peter's Church in the Citigroup Center at 619 Lexington Avenue at the corner of East 54th Street in Midtown Manhattan.

The York Theatre moved to The Theatre at St. Jeans (150 East 76th Street & Lexington Avenue) in St. Jean Baptiste Roman Catholic Church after a January 2021 water main break flooded their home at Saint Peter's Church.

In October 2024, after a 50 year association with The York, James Morgan resigned as Producing Artistic Director, and his longtime associate, Joseph Hayward, assumed the position of Interim Artistic Director.

== The Oscar Hammerstein Award ==
The Oscar Hammerstein Award named in honor of American lyricist and librettist Oscar Hammerstein was created in 1988 by Janet Hayes Walker, the founding artistic director of the York Theatre Company, and is presented with the endorsement of the Rodgers & Hammerstein Organization and the Hammerstein family. The Oscar Hammerstein Award Gala is the major annual fundraising event of the York Theatre.

Past recipients include:

Stephen Sondheim, Betty Comden & Adolph Green, Harold Prince, Cy Coleman, Charles Strouse, Arthur Laurents, Jerry Herman, Stephen Schwartz, Peter Stone, David Merrick, John Kander & Fred Ebb, Terrence McNally, Cameron Mackintosh, Carol Channing, Tony Walton, Joseph Stein, George S. Irving, Jerry Bock & Sheldon Harnick, Thomas Meehan, Barbara Cook, Paul Gemignani, Alan Menken, Lynn Ahrens & Stephen Flaherty, Angela Lansbury, Joel Grey, Tom Jones & Harvey Schmidt, Susan Stroman, André De Shields, Richard Maltby, Jr. & David Shire, Leslie Uggams, Patti LuPone, and Bernadette Peters.

== The York Theatre Company Productions ==
Notable mainstage productions include:

- A Sign of the Times
- The Jerusalem Syndrome
- Vanities—The Musical
- Hoagy Carmichael's Stardust Road
- Cheek to Cheek: Irving Berlin in Hollywood
- Penelope, or How the Odyssey Was Really Written
- Forbidden Broadway: The Next Generation
- Anything Can Happen in the Theater: The Musical World of Maury Yeston
- Enter Laughing
- Christmas in Hell
- Midnight at the Never Get
- Lonesome Blues
- Unexpected Joy
- Desperate Measures
- Marry Harry
- A Taste of Things to Come
- You're a Good Man, Charlie Brown
- Plaid Tidings
- Rothschild & Sons
- Cagney, the Musical
- Harold and Maude
- Texas in Paris
- Inventing Mary Martin
- Love, Linda: The Life of Mrs. Cole Porter
- Storyville
- I'm a Stranger Here Myself
- Closer Than Ever
- Ionescopade
- Tomorrow Morning
- The Road to Qatar
- Falling for Eve
- Yank! A WWII Love Story
- Blind Lemon Blues
- My Vaudeville Man!
- That Time of the Year
- Asylum: The Strange Case of Mary Lincoln
- A Fine & Private Place
- Thrill Me: The Leopold & Loeb Story
- A Funny Thing Happened on the Way to the Forum
- Philemon
- Sweeney Todd: The Demon Barber of Fleet Street
- Moby Dick
- Cherokee County
