= Will Glickman =

American dramatist

Will Glickman (March 7, 1910 – March 11, 1983) was an American playwright who frequently collaborated with Joseph Stein.

Glickman made his Broadway debut in 1948 with sketches he and Stein wrote for the revue Lend an Ear. The two went on to collaborate on Mrs. Gibbons' Boys (1949), Alive and Kicking (1950), Mr. Wonderful (1956), The Body Beautiful (1958), and Plain and Fancy (1955), which proved to be their biggest success, garnering a Tony nomination for Best Musical.

Glickman's television credits include adaptations of The Desert Song and The Chocolate Soldier. He also wrote scripts for The DuPont Show of the Month and The United States Steel Hour, and collaborated with Fred Saidy and Neil Simon, among others, on Satins and Spurs, an original musical for Betty Hutton, which was broadcast by NBC in September 1954.

The Will Glickman Award, administered by the Will Glickman Foundation and Theatre Bay Area, has been bestowed since 1984. The annual award, presented to the author of the best play to make its world premiere in the San Francisco Bay Area, comes with a $4,000 check. Past winners include Denis Johnson and Tony Kushner Rajiv Joseph's The North Pool was the 2011 recipient.
