= 4th Wall Theatre, Inc. =

Coordinates: 40.801°N 74.189°W

4th Wall Theatre, Inc. (aka 4th Wall Musical Theatre) is a non-equity theatre company in residence at the Westminster Arts Center on the campus of Bloomfield College, in Bloomfield, New Jersey, approximately 10 miles from Manhattan. The group derived its name from the theatre term the fourth wall coined by Denis Diderot which describes it as “the imaginary wall at the front of the stage in a proscenium, through which the audience sees the action in the world of the play”.

== History ==
Friends, who all worked as performers or artistic staff members at the Montclair Operetta Club in Montclair, NJ, conceived the idea of the non-profit 4th Wall Musical Theatre in 1996. The original founding members included Mark Frawley and Deborah Martin (artistic directors) with original board members, Richard Colonna, Lisa Hughes, Kathi Iannacone, Ed Kamholz, Nancy Marino, Gwen Ricks-Spencer, along with Charles Alexander Hay and Beth Vecchio. The group wanted to do smaller, lesser known musicals which focused more on ensemble work, rather than serving as a “star” vehicle for a performer. The group was incorporated in 1997 and began work its first fundraising production Star Dust: A Tribute to the Music of the 1940s. This was followed by production of the group's first full-length show, the musical Working, based on Studs Terkels’ book of the same name with music by a variety of artists including Stephen Schwartz, James Taylor and Micki Grant to name a few. During 4th Wall's early years, the group continued to fine tune its mission and saw both audience growth and critical recognition for its presentations of musicals such as Pippin, Is there life after high school?, Godspell, Falsettos, Violet and A New Brain in addition to many others. The group produced at the Morristown-Beard School in Morristown, NJ.

In 2002, 4th Wall was asked by the Bickford Theatre, located in the Morris Museum, to begin producing in its state-of-the-art theatre space. 4th Wall moved and presented musicals such as Songs for a New World, Hair, Dames at Sea and La Cage aux Folles.

In the ensuing years, 4th Wall shifted its focus from ensemble pieces to producing lesser known and/or seldom produced musicals. Productions included Bat Boy: The Musical, Big River, Ain’t Misbehavin’, Kiss of the Spider Woman, and Assassins. In the winter of 2006, the group made its current move to be the theatre in residence at the Westminster Arts Center on the campus of Bloomfield. In 2007, 4th Wall began offering stipends to its actors.

The group is driven by executive staff members and the board of directors: Gwen Ricks-Spencer-Executive Director, Kate Swan-Artistic Director, Martha Thalheimer-Business Manager, Nik Marmo, Julie Galorenzo and Jasmine Pai. 4th Wall staff and performers come to the theatre with credits from Broadway, Off-Broadway, National and European tours, Regional Theatre and Television. Many aspiring performers have worked with the group and moved on to these arenas as well.

== M.I.D. (Musicals-in-Development) Stage Series ==
Since moving to Westminster, 4th Wall has expanded its mission and season. Under the leadership of former Artistic Director Gregory Allen, the group launched the M.I.D. Stage Series in 2006. The program is designed to present new musical theatre works from emerging composers and writers. The staff and the cast work with the writers throughout the production process (from auditions to production). The show is then mounted in a bare bones production and talk back sessions with the audience conclude each evening's performance. The goal is to create a forum where new and emerging artists can have their work presented in a supportive environment, outside the intense glare of New York as an important and critical development step for the work. The hope is that one day these works will become the main stage productions for other theatres.

== Off the Wall Stage Series ==
In 2007, 4th Wall rolled out its Off the Wall Series which is dedicated to taking 4th Wall's mission of producing lesser known works to a new level. Off the Wall showcases more avant-garde and lesser known musical works. In addition, the group has added plays to its schedule with this series.

== Educational programs ==
4th Wall has developed a partnership with the New Jersey School of Dramatic Arts (“NJSDA”) which serves as the educational wing of our theatre. NJSDA is a comprehensive theater arts training program for the beginning actor to the working professional. Classes are available at all levels for Adults, Teens, and Children and are taught by industry professionals from Theater, TV, and Film. NJSDA offers theater arts training designed in a step by step program which builds on the skills gained in previous levels. NJSDA emphasizes the development of a strong and proven technique. As a partner organization, NJSDA students have the opportunity to intern with 4th Wall and receive specially priced rush tickets to 4th Wall performances. In addition, students are encouraged to audition for 4th Wall.
