= 4th & Wall =

Studio album by West Indian Girl
- Released: October 23, 2007
- Genre: Dream pop, psychedelic rock
- Length: 53:46
- Label: Milan
- Producer: Illuminus & Richard James

West Indian Girl chronology
| West Indian Girl (2004) | 4th & Wall (2007) | Shangri La (2012) |

Professional ratings
Review scores
| Source | Rating |
|---|---|
| Allmusic | 4.5/5 stars |
| Pitchfork Media | (4.8/10) |

4th & Wall is the second studio album by the dream pop band West Indian Girl, released in October 2007 on Milan Records.

The album takes its name from the street corner in Los Angeles where the band's studio is located.

The first single from the album was "Blue Wave", which was released in advance of the album.

== Production ==
Prior to this release, West Indian Girl had been a duo, consisting of Robert James and Francis Ten. For this album, four new members were added to the band's lineup - Mariqueen Maandig on vocals, Mark Lewis on drums and Nathan Van Hala and Amy White on keyboards.

== Track listing ==
| No. | Title | Length |
|---|---|---|
| 1. | "To Die In L.A." | 4:09 |
| 2. | "Blue Wave" | 4:14 |
| 3. | "Sofia" | 5:59 |
| 4. | "All My Friends" | 4:36 |
| 5. | "Indian Ocean" | 5:00 |
| 6. | "Up The Coast" | 4:31 |
| 7. | "Solar Eyes" | 7:53 |
| 8. | "Lost Children" | 3:48 |
| 9. | "Back To You" | 4:22 |
| 10. | "Rise From The Dead" | 5:44 |
| 11. | "Get Up" | 3:37 |

== Personnel ==
- Robert James – vocals, guitar
- Francis Ten – bass
- Mariqueen Maandig – vocals, tambourine
- Mark Lewis – drums, backing vocals
- Nathan Van Hala – keyboards
- Amy White – keyboards, backing vocals
- Chris Arpad - guest Steel Pans
