= Joseph Stein =

American dramatist (1912–2010)

- Born: May 30, 1912; New York City, U.S.
- Died: October 24, 2010 (aged 98); New York City, U.S.
- Education: City College of New York (BS); Columbia University (MSW)
- Occupations: Author, playwright
- Spouses: Sadie Singer Stein (died 1974) Elisa Loti (m. 1976–2010)
- Children: 3, including Harry Stein
- Awards: Tony Award for Best Musical; 1965 Fiddler on the Roof; Tony Award for Best Author; 1965 Fiddler on the Roof

Joseph Stein (May 30, 1912 – October 24, 2010) was an American playwright best known for writing the books for such musicals as Fiddler on the Roof and Zorba.

== Biography ==
Born in New York City to Jewish parents, Charles and Emma (Rosenblum) Stein, who had immigrated from Poland, Joseph Stein grew up in the Bronx. He graduated in 1935 from CCNY, with a B.S. degree, then earned a Master of Social Work degree from Columbia University in 1937. He began his career as a psychiatric social worker from 1939 until 1945, while writing comedy on the side.

A chance encounter with Zero Mostel led him to start writing for radio personalities, including Henry Morgan, Hildegarde, Tallulah Bankhead, Phil Silvers, and Jackie Gleason. He later started working in television for Sid Caesar when he joined the writing team of Your Show of Shows that included Mel Brooks, Carl Reiner, and Neil Simon.

=== Theatre ===
Stein made his Broadway debut contributing sketches written with Will Glickman to the 1948 revue Lend an Ear. His first book musical came about when Richard Kollmar, husband of columnist Dorothy Kilgallen, asked him to write a musical about Pennsylvania that would promote the state as Rodgers and Hammerstein's Oklahoma! had its namesake. Stein and his writing partner Will Glickman were drawn to the Amish community of Lancaster County. They purchased a 50-cent tourist book filled with Pennsylvania Dutch slang and returned to New York to write Plain and Fancy, which opened on Broadway on January 27, 1955 and ran for 461 performances. It was an "old-fashioned, low-pressure alternative set among the Pennsylvania Dutch. It was pleasant and certainly suitable for the family trade." The musical has been playing at The Round Barn Theatre at Amish Acres in Nappanee, Indiana annually since 1986, and surpassed 3,000 performances as of 2010. Richard Pletcher, founder and producer, dedicated The Round Barn Theatre stage to Stein in 1997 during its production of The Baker's Wife. The theatre has produced eight of Stein's musicals since then.

His greatest success came from writing the book for the 1964 musical play Fiddler on the Roof, for which he won three major awards, including two Tonys. He later wrote the screenplay for the film adaptation.

Stein's additional Broadway credits include Alive and Kicking, Mr. Wonderful, The Body Beautiful, Juno, Take Me Along, Zorba, Irene, Carmelina, The Baker's Wife, Rags, Enter Laughing and its musical adaptation, So Long, 174th Street. He also wrote the plays Mrs. Gibbons' Boys and Before the Dawn. He co-wrote, with Carl Reiner, the screenplay for the film adaptation of Enter Laughing. The Baker's Wife, written with Stephen Schwartz, was directed by Trevor Nunn in London in 1989 where it was nominated for an Olivier Award for Musical of the Year.

Stein wrote the book for the musical All About Us, with a score by Kander and Ebb, based on The Skin of Our Teeth by Thornton Wilder. It premiered at the Westport Country Playhouse in April 2007.

York Theatre

The York Theatre featured Stein's Take Me Along, Carmelina, and Plain and Fancy as its 2006 "Musicals in Mufti" staged concert series. Stein revised Carmelina reducing it to a cast of seven from its original Broadway version for the York reading. Its 2007 series featured four additional Stein musicals, Zorba, Enter Laughing: The Musical (renamed from So Long, 174th Street), The Body Beautiful, and The Baker's Wife. The readings are presented in concert format in mufti, in street clothes without scenery or props.

The York Theatre, under Artistic Director James Morgan, went on to produce a critically acclaimed fully staged off-Broadway production of Enter Laughing: The Musical from September 3, 2008 through October 12, starring Jill Eikenberry and Michael Tucker. It was nominated for a 2009 Lucille Lortel Award for outstanding revival. A Broadway transfer has been announced.

Encores!

Victoria Clark starred the City Center Encores! production of Marc Blitzstein and Joseph Stein’s Juno. Directed by Garry Hynes, with guest music direction by Eric Stern and musical staging by Warren Carlyle, Juno played for five performances, from March 27 – 30, 2008 at New York City Center and was the first presentation since the original Broadway staging in 1959 to use the original orchestration by Blitzstein, Hershy Kay and Robert Russell Bennett.

Juno, with music and lyrics by Marc Blitzstein and book by Joseph Stein is based on the 1924 play Juno and the Paycock by Seán O'Casey. It originally opened on Broadway at the Winter Garden Theater on March 9, 1959, starring Shirley Booth and Melvyn Douglas and played a total of sixteen performances. Songs include "I Wish It So", "We’re Alive", and "One Kind Word".

== Personal life ==
Stein lived in Manhattan with his wife Elisa Loti, an Obie Award and Theatre World Award-winning actress who was featured on the cover of LIFE Magazine and who is now a psychotherapist practicing as Elisa Stein. He was a member of the Dramatists Guild Council from 1975 until his death. Joseph Stein died in 2010, aged 98, from complications of a fall.

His son Harry Stein, unlike his father, is a political conservative and a writer known for his satirical political commentary. He had two other sons, Daniel and Josh, from his first marriage to Sadie Singer Stein, who died in 1974. He also had a stepdaughter, Jenny Lyn Bader, and a stepson, John M. Bader, from his marriage to Elisa Loti.

== Honors ==
In January 2008, Joseph Stein was inducted into the Theater Hall of Fame. He was honored by The Dramatists Guild of America with a Lifetime Achievement Award in 2008 and by the York Theatre with the Oscar Hammerstein Award for Lifetime Achievement in Musical Theatre in 2007. Joseph Stein was awarded the prestigious York Theatre Company's Oscar Hammerstein Award for Lifetime Achievement in Theatre in 2007

Other organizations to honor Mr. Stein include Writers and Artists for Peace in the Middle East, which gave him a Distinguished Achievement Award; the Walnut Street Theatre, which gave him the Edwin Forrest Award for outstanding contributions to the theatre in 2001; the Alumni Association of City College, which awarded him the Townshend Harris Medal in 2004; and Encompass New Opera Theatre, which honored him with a Lifetime Achievement Award in 2009.

== Awards and nominations ==
Awards

- 1965 Tony Award for Best Musical – Fiddler on the Roof
- 1965 Tony Award for Best Author of a Musical – Fiddler on the Roof
- 1965 New York Drama Critics Circle Award for Best Musical – Fiddler on the Roof

Nominations

- 1960 Tony Award for Best Musical – Take Me Along
- 1969 New York Drama Critics Circle Award for Best Musical – Zorba
- 1969 Tony Award for Best Musical – Zorba
- 1971 Writers Guild of America Screen Writers' Annual Award for Best Comedy Adapted from Another Medium – Fiddler on the Roof
- 1987 Tony Award for Best Book of a Musical – Rags
