= West Indian Girl =

American rock band

- Origin: Los Angeles, California, U.S.
- Genres: Dream pop; neo-psychedelia; space rock
- Years active: 2004–present
- Label: Astralwerks
- Members: Robert James; Francis Ten; Nathan Van Hala; Laura Vall; Eva Zeva; Jesper Kristensen
- Past members: Chris Carter; Mariqueen Maandig; Mark Lewis; Amy White
- Website: westindiangirl.com

West Indian Girl is an American rock band from Los Angeles, California. The band's name comes from a type of lysergic acid (LSD) that was popular in the early 1960s. The initials are also a reference to Robert James' and Francis Ten's previous band, "WIG".

== History ==
The band released their self-titled debut album in August 2004 on Astralwerks.

West Indian Girl singer and guitarist Robert James and bassist Francis Ten first met in Detroit in the early 1990s. After Ten moved to Los Angeles, the pair continued their collaboration through the mail until James followed westward. Taking their name from a strain of early street LSD, James and Ten signed with EMI's imprint Astralwerks and formed a proper band for live gigs. After the 2004 release of their self-titled debut album, West Indian Girl released a more dance-oriented remix EP in 2006. Parting company with Astralwerks after their two releases failed to ignite much notice, West Indian Girl signed with the indie label Milan Records and announced the release of their second proper album, 4th and Wall, in October 2007.

In August 2007, the band signed a recording and wireless distribution deal with digital media and entertainment company Flycell. The first single, Blue Wave, was released on September 25, 2007. The band released "4th On the Floor Remixes, Vol. 2" on January 6, 2009, on Smash Hit Music Co.

== Band members ==
Current members

- Robert James - guitar, vocals
- Francis Ten - bass
- Nathan Van Hala - piano, keyboards
- Jesper Kristensen - drums
- Eva Zeva - vocals

Past members

- Chris Carter - keyboards 2004–2005
- Mariqueen Maandig - vocals 2004–2009
- Mark Lewis - drums 2004–2009
- Amy White - keyboards, vocals 2007–2010
- Laura Vall - vocals

== Discography ==
- West Indian Girl, August 24, 2004, Astralwerks ASW 78431
- Remix EP, August 15, 2006, Astralwerks ASW 70470
- 4th & Wall, October 23, 2007
- 4th On The Floor (Remixes, Vol. 2) January 6, 2009
- We Believe, July 7, 2009 (B-sides and rarities collection), Origami Records
- Shangri La, April, 2013
