= Carl Fallberg =

American cartoonist and artist (1915–1996)

- Born: Carl Robert Fallberg; September 11, 1915; Cleveland, Tennessee, U.S.
- Died: May 9, 1996 (aged 80); Glendale, California, U.S.
- Occupations: Writer, cartoonist
- Years active: 1935–1990
- Employer(s): Disney Studios, Hanna-Barbera
- Spouse(s): Bertha "Becky" Fallberg (née Dorner) (June 10, 1923 – October 9, 2007)
- Children: Carla Larissa Fallberg
- Parent(s): Carl Fallberg (Sr.); Gunhild Fallberg (née Sjöstedt)

Carl Robert Fallberg (September 11, 1915 – May 9, 1996) was a writer and cartoonist known for his work on animated feature films and TV cartoons for Disney Studios, Hanna-Barbera, and Warner Brothers. He also wrote comic books for Dell Comics, Western Publishing, and Gold Key Comics.

== Early life ==
Carl Robert Fallberg was born in Cleveland, Tennessee on September 11, 1915, to Carl Fallberg (Sr.) and Gunhild Fallberg (née Sjöstedt), who taught music at the Centenary College Conservatory in Cleveland, Tennessee from 1910 to 1917. Carl was the middle of three children, with an older sister, Lisa Lina "Dixie," and a younger sister, Elinor Faith. The family moved to Chicago, and in 1930, his mother died.

Carl attended Nicholas Senn High School in Chicago, Illinois. In 1934, he sent a letter with samples of his gag ideas and artwork to Walt Disney, seeking employment. On his third attempt, he was offered a job and began working for Walt Disney Studios in 1935 (then located at 2719 Hyperion Avenue in Hollywood, California).

Carl and his sister Elinor (1923-2014) lived in a rooming house at 3021 Angus Street, a few blocks from the Hyperion Studios. There, he met his future wife, Becky Dorner, the daughter of the family who owned the rooming house. During World War II, Elinor and Becky worked at Disney Studios while Carl served in the U.S. Marines at Quantico, Virginia as part of the Marine Corps film unit.

Becky and Carl married at the First Unitarian Church in Los Angeles, California, on July 14, 1945, and had one child, Carla Larissa Fallberg, born in 1955. Becky continued to work for Disney Studios, eventually becoming the Manager of the Ink and Paint Department, while Carl worked as a freelance writer and cartoonist for Disney, Hanna Barbera, and several other cartoon studios and comic book publishers companies.

== Professional cartoonist ==
=== Fiddletown & Copperopolis ===
Fallberg's love of narrow-gauge railroads in early mining communities was expressed through his cartoon drawings published in his Fiddletown & Copperopolis gag strip, which appeared in Railroad Magazine. A compilation of his Fiddletown and Copperopolis cartoons was first published as a book"Fiddletown and Copperopolis - The life and times of an uncommon carrier" in 1960 by Hungerford Press. Subsequent editions were published by Heimburger House in 1985, 1998, and 2003.

From his early days at Disney, Carl shared his enthusiasm for Colorado's narrow-gauge railroads with Ward Kimball and the Grizzly Flats Railroad, and incorporated the theme into some comic stories he wrote, such as the Mickey Mouse story "The Vanishing Railroad".

Carl Fallberg was a member of the Animation Guild I.A.T.S.E. Local 839.

=== Disney ===
Fallberg began working at Disney Studios in 1935. Early in his career, he worked as an assistant director and storyman on the Disney animated features Snow White and the Seven Dwarfs, Fantasia, and Bambi.

He transitioned to working on Disney comic books for Dell Publishing and was noted for scripting many of the Mickey Mouse serials illustrated by Paul Murry that appeared in Walt Disney's Comics and Stories from the early 1950s to 1962. During this time, Fallberg and Murry produced almost all of those serials in Walt Disney Comics and Stories. After 1962, Murry frequently worked with other writers, but collaborations between him and Fallberg would occasionally appear until 1973.

Besides his work with Murry, Fallberg also freelanced, writing and illustrating Disney comic books featuring Li'l Bad Wolf, Jiminy Cricket, Professor Ludwig Von Drake, Scrooge McDuck, Mickey Mouse, Donald Duck, Gyro Gearloose, Goofy, Chip 'n' Dale, and many others. From 1963 to 1989, Carl also wrote scripts for the Disney Studio Program, and from 1974 to 1985, he wrote scripts for the comic strips Walt Disney's Treasury of Classic Tales (Sunday) and the Disney Christmas Story daily strips that appeared each December. The last comic book story Carl wrote for Disney was "Goofy the Kid" in 1990.

Carl's "special" Disney projects included writing the promotional comics Adventure in Disneyland (1955) for Richfield Oil and Mickey and Goofy Explore Energy (1976) for Exxon, which he later redesigned to promote the Epcot Universe of Energy attraction. He wrote the Sears Winnie the Pooh Coloring Book in 1975, contributed to The Wonderful World of Disney (1969–70), a Gulf Oil giveaway magazine, and provided the text for two of Whitman's Big Little Books: Donald Duck and the Luck of the Ducks and Donald Duck and the Fabulous Diamond Fountain.

=== Hanna-Barbera ===
From 1972 through 1981, Carl worked as a storyman and story director on the Hanna-Barbera cartoon television shows: Josie and the Pussycats in Outer Space, Scooby-Doo, Butch Cassidy and the Sundance Kids, Wheelie and the Chopper Bunch, The All-New Popeye Hour, Laugh-a-Lympics, The Three Robonic Stooges and The Kwicky Koala Show. Carl also wrote for the Hanna-Barbera comic books of: The Flintstones, Yogi Bear, Huckleberry Hound, and The Jetsons.

=== Warner Bros. ===
From 1953 through the early 1970s, Carl wrote for the Warner Bros. Animation characters of Bugs Bunny, Daffy Duck, Mary Jane & Sniffles, and Speedy Gonzales, and was story director for Yosemite Sam, Daffy Duck, and Speedy Gonzales. During this time, Fallberg also worked on the Warner Bros. Speedy and Daffy Show.

=== Other cartoon comic books ===
His work for MGM comic books included The Addams Family, Tom & Jerry, Droopy, and Screwy Squirrel, as well as Mr. Magoo for UPA, and The Pink Panther and The Inspector for DePatie-Freleng. For Walter Lantz, Carl wrote Woody Woodpecker, Andy Panda, Chilly Willy, and Homer Pigeon comic books.

== Filmography ==
Feature films and television:

=== Feature films ===
- 1937, Snow White and the Seven Dwarfs (assistant director - uncredited)
- 1942, Bambi (story development)
- 1940 and 2000, Fantasia and Fantasia 2000 (story development for "The Sorcerer's Apprentice" segment)
- World War II, USMCR: Writer/cartoonist of training and propaganda films

=== Television ===
- 1971, The Pebbles and Bamm-Bamm Show (TV series) (story director - 1 episode)
- 1972, The New Scooby-Doo Movies (TV series) (story director - 16 episodes)
- 1972, Josie and the Pussy Cats in Outer Space (TV series) (story director - 16 episodes)
- 1972, The Flintstone Comedy Hour (TV series) (story director)
- 1972, The ABC Saturday Superstar Movie (TV series) (story director - 1 episode)
- 1973, The Roman Holidays (TV series) (story director - 2 episodes)
- 1973, The Addams Family (1973 TV series) (story director - 5 episodes)
- 1973, Butch Cassidy (TV series) (story director)
- 1974, Wheelie and the Chopper Bunch (TV series) (storyboard editor)
- 1977, The Skatebirds (TV series) (story director)
- 1978, Dinky Dog (TV series) (story director)
- 1978, Yogi's Space Race (TV series) (story director)
- 1978, Galaxy Goof-Ups (TV series) (story director)
- 1978-79, The All-New Popeye Hour (TV series) (story director)
- 1980, The Flintstone Comedy Show (TV series) (story director and writer - 1 episode)
- 1981, The Kwicky Koala Show (TV series) (story director and writer - 16 episodes)
- 1984, Flintstone Funnies (writer)

== Publications ==
Carl Robert Fallberg publications:

- 1949, Carl Fallberg. p. 108, "Fiddletown & Copperopolis Ry. (No. 5)," Railroad magazine, Vol. 47, no. 4. New York, Frank A. Munsey Co.
- 1950, Carl Fallberg. p. 114, "Fiddletown & Copperopolis Ry. (No. 20)," Railroad magazine, Vol. 51, no. 3. New York, Frank A. Munsey Co.
- 1950, Carl Fallberg. p. 116, "Fiddletown & Copperopolis Ry. (No. 27),".Railroad magazine, Vol. 53, no. 2. New York, Frank A. Munsey Co.
- 1952, Carl Fallberg. p. 94, "Fiddletown & Copperopolis (No. 42)," Railroad magazine, Vol. 57, no. 1. Kokomo, IN, Popular Publications.
- 1952, Carl Fallberg. p. 112, "Fiddletown & Copperopolis (No. 44)," Railroad magazine, Vol. 57, no. 3. Kokomo, IN, Popular Publications
- 1952, Carl Fallberg. p. 119, "Fiddletown & Copperopolis (No. 46)," Railroad magazine, Vol. 58, no. 1. Kokomo, IN, Popular Publications
- 1953, Carl Fallberg. p. 100, "Fiddletown & Copperopolis (No. 56)," Railroad magazine., Vol. 60, no. 3. Kokomo, IN, Popular Publications
- 1955, Carl Fallberg, Paul Murry. Mickey Mouse in Walkie Doggie, Dell/Western.
- 1956, Carl Fallberg, Paul Murry. Mickey Mouse in the Vanishing Railroad, Dell/Western.
- 1957, Carl Fallberg, Paul Murry. Mickey Mouse in The Legend of Loon Lake, Dell/Western.
- 1957, Carl Fallberg, Paul Murry. Mickey Mouse The Phantom Fires, Dell/Western.
- 1967, Carl Fallberg. Walt Disney's Donald Duck - The fabulous diamond fountain. Racine, WI,: Western Publishing Co.
- 1967, Carl Fallberg. Tom and Jerry meet Mr. Fingers. Racine, WI, Whitman Pub. Co.
- 1967, Carl Fallberg. Mickey Mouse the super sword. Racine, WI, Western Pub. Co., ISBN 0-307-61934-6, ISBN 978-0-307-61934-1
- 1968, Carl Fallberg. Beep beep the road runner - The super beep-catcher. Racine, WI, Western
- 1968, Carl Fallberg. Hanna-Barbera's Frankenstein, Jr. - The menace of the heartless monster. Racine, WI, Whitman Pub. Co.
- 1974, Carl Fallberg. Beep beep the Road Runner - The lost road runner mine. Racine, WI, Western Pub. Co.
- 1984, Carl Fallberg, Paul Murry. Mickey Mouse - The super sword, New York, Western Pub., ISBN 0-307-11934-3, ISBN 978-0-307-11934-6
- 1985, Carl Fallberg. Fiddletown & Copperopolis - The life and times of an uncommon carrier. Rev. 2nd ed. River Forest, IL, Heimburger House Pub. Co. ISBN 0-911581-04-9 (pbk.) ISBN 9780911581041 (pbk.)
- 1990, Carl Fallberg, Al Hubbard, Rudyard Kipling, Jane Werner Watson. Walt Disney's classic the Jungle book. Burbank, CA Walt Disney Publications, ISBN 1-56115-047-9, ISBN 978-1-56115-047-2
- 1991, Carl Fallberg. Walt Disney's classic 101 Dalmatians. Burbank, CA : W.D. Publications, ISBN 1-56115-140-8
- 2008, Carl Fallberg, Robert Klein, Pat McGreal, Carol McGreal. Walt Disney's Comics 691. Paw Prints, ISBN 978-1-4395-5747-1, ISBN 1-4395-5747-0
- 2010, Aaron Sparrow, Chris Meyer, Christopher Burns comic book editor, Jason Long comic book editor, Carl Fallberg ("Yesterday Ranch"), Paul Murry, Erika Terriquez, Floyd Gottfredson, Earl Duvall, Dick Moores, George Waiss, Bill Walsh, Manuel Gonzales. Walt Disney's Mickey Mouse classics - Mouse mayhem. Los Angeles, Boom! Kids, ISBN 978-1-60886-544-4.
