= Disney Christmas Story =

1960-1987 seasonal Disney comic strip

- Author(s): Frank Reilly, Carl Fallberg, Floyd Norman
- Illustrator(s): Manuel Gonzales, Chuck Fuson, John Ushler, Floyd Gottfredson, Guillermo Cardoso, Mike Arens, Cliff Nordberg, James Swain, Tom McKimson, Lorna Smith, Larry Mayer, Willie Ito, Tony Strobl, Mike Royer, Steve Steere, Bill Langley, Keith Moseley
- Current status/schedule: Concluded annual Christmas strip
- Launch date: November 28, 1960
- End date: December 24, 1987
- Syndicate(s): King Features Syndicate

Disney Christmas Story is an American Disney comic strip that appeared each year in the weeks before Christmas, beginning in 1960. The strip ran Monday to Saturday for the three to four weeks leading up to Christmas Eve, and often promoted the latest Disney release or re-release. The strips were usually not published on the newspaper's comics page; they appeared at the bottom of the page somewhere else in the paper, so that the reader would have to hunt for it, and not-coincidentally pass by some of the Christmas advertising. The strip appeared every year until 1987.

In 2017, the Christmas stories were collected in a hardback volume, Disney's Christmas Classics, published by IDW Publishing. The collection includes all of the Christmas stories except for 1986's story based on Song of the South.

== Development ==
Unlike most Disney comic strips, Disney Christmas Story actively mixed characters from different Disney films—for example, in 1962, Ludwig Von Drake saved Princess Aurora from Maleficent's spell, and in 1976, the Seven Dwarfs and Pinocchio helped Santa Claus foil an evil plot hatched by Captain Hook, the Big Bad Wolf and Honest John to steal his toys and hold them for ransom. The 1963 sequence was the only comic strip appearance of the popular Disney comics character Li'l Bad Wolf, and the 1971 story features a rare comic-strip appearance by the Beagle Boys.

The strip was written by Frank Reilly from its inception in 1960 until 1975, and then by Carl Fallberg from 1976 to 1984. Floyd Norman wrote the 1985 and 1986 sequences, and Fallberg wrote the last story in 1987.

When Norman was given the assignment to write the Christmas Story in 1985, he was bothered by the way that the stories mixed up characters from different films. He recalled in a 2013 blog post, "I couldn't help but find this approach somewhat bizarre. Mickey and Pluto didn't fit in the same world as Dumbo and the seven dwarfs certainly didn't mix well with Jaq and Gus Gus from Cinderella. I decided if I was going to write a holiday story the characters used would have to be consistent... No more of this wacky 'mix and match' approach to Disney storytelling." Norman's first story featured only characters from One Hundred and One Dalmatians, and his second characters from Song of the South.

In 1992, the strip returned as Disney Holiday Story, telling more straightforward tales starring the characters from the most recent Disney animated release. This strip lasted for six years, until 1997. All six storylines were written by Floyd Norman (with Karen Kreider on the first year), and illustrated by Richard Moore.

== Disney Christmas Story ==
Title	Dates	Characters	Writers	Artists	INDUCKS link
Peter Pan's Christmas Story	1960 (Nov 28-Dec 24)	Peter Pan, Captain Hook, Mr. Smee, Tinker Bell, the Seven Dwarfs	Frank Reilly	Manuel Gonzales	CS 1
Pinocchio's Christmas Story	1961 (Nov 27-Dec 23)	Pinocchio, Geppetto, Jiminy Cricket, Stromboli, Honest John, Gideon & the Blue Fairy	Frank Reilly	Chuck Fuson & Manuel Gonzales	CS 2
Sleeping Beauty's Christmas Story	1962 (Nov 26-Dec 24)	Princess Aurora, Prince Phillip, the Good Fairies, Maleficent & Ludwig Von Drake	Frank Reilly	John Ushler	CS 3
Three Little Pigs Christmas Story	1963 (Nov 25-Dec 24)	The Three Little Pigs, the Big Bad Wolf & Li'l Bad Wolf	Frank Reilly	Floyd Gottfredson	CS 4
Cinderella's Christmas Party	1964 (Nov 23-Dec 24)	Cinderella, Lady Tremaine, Anastasia, Drizella, Gus, Jaq, & the Fairy Godmother	Frank Reilly	Manuel Gonzales	CS 5
Bambi's Christmas Adventure	1965 (Nov 29-Dec 24)	Bambi, Flower & Mr. Stork	Frank Reilly	Floyd Gottfredson	CS 6
Snow White's Christmas Surprise	1966 (Nov 28-Dec 24)	Snow White, the Seven Dwarfs & the Evil Queen	Frank Reilly	Mike Arens	CS 7
Dumbo and the Christmas Mystery	1967 (Nov 27-Dec 23)	Dumbo, Timothy Q. Mouse, Mad Madam Mim, Maleficent & the Seven Dwarfs	Frank Reilly	Mike Arens	CS 8
Santa Claus in Neverland	1968 (Nov 25-Dec 24)	Peter Pan, Tinker Bell, Captain Hook, Mr. Smee, the Lost Boys, the Indian Girls, the Mermaids & the Pirates	Frank Reilly	Cliff Nordberg & Manuel Gonzales	CS 9
The Quest for Christmas	1969 (Dec 1-24)	The Seven Dwarfs, Who from Planet Galaxia, the Good Fairies	Frank Reilly	James Swain & Manuel Gonzales	CS 10
Santa's Christmas Crisis	1970 (Nov 30-Dec 24)	Maleficent, her raven & the Goon	Frank Reilly	John Ushler	CS 11
The Christmas Conspiracy	1971 (Dec 6-24)	The Beagle Boys, Gus, Jaq & Mr. Stork	Frank Reilly	Mike Arens	CS 12
The Magic Christmas Tree	1972 (Dec 4-23)	Merlin, Mad Madam Mim	Frank Reilly	John Ushler	CS 13
A Castle for Christmas	1973 (Dec 3-24)	Mr. Stork, Bambi & Thumper	Frank Reilly	John Ushler	CS 14
Santa's Crucial Christmas	1974 (Dec 2-24)	Timothy Q. Mouse, the Seven Dwarfs, Pinocchio, Jiminy Cricket, Robin Hood, Little John, the Three Little Pigs, Gus, Jaq, Merlin & the Big Bad Wolf	Frank Reilly	Tom McKimson	CS 15
Santa and the Pirates	1975 (Dec 1-24)	The Seven Dwarfs, Gus & Jaq	Frank Reilly	John Ushler	CS 16
Captain Hook's Christmas Caper	1976 (Nov 29-Dec 24)	The Three Little Pigs, Br'er Bear, Missus Bear, Honest John, the Big Bad Wolf, the Seven Dwarfs, Pinocchio & Archimedes	Carl Fallberg	Lorna Smith & Larry Mayer	CS 17
No Puppets for Christmas	1977 (Dec 5-24)	Peter Pan, Gepetto, Stromboli, Honest John & the Fairy Godmother	Carl Fallberg	Willie Ito & Larry Mayer	CS 18
The Day Christmas Was Banned	1978 (Dec 4-23)	Prince John, the Sheriff of Nottingham, Mr. Stork, Dumbo, Skippy & the Robin Hood Kids	Carl Fallberg	Tony Strobl & Larry Mayer	CS 19
Madam Mim's Christmas Grudge	1979 (Dec 3-24)	Mad Madam Mim, Merlin & Wart	Carl Fallberg	Tony Strobl & Mike Royer	CS 20
Santa's Magical Christmas Helpers	1980 (Dec 1-24)	Pinocchio, the Big Bad Wolf, Br'er Bear & the Good Fairies	Carl Fallberg	Tony Strobl & Mike Royer	CS 21
Cinderella's Christmas Crisis	1981 (Nov 30-Dec 24)	Cinderella, Lucifer, Anastasia, Drizella, Gus, Jaq & the Fairy Godmother	Carl Fallberg	Tony Strobl & Steve Steere	CS 22
The Mysterious Christmas Spell	1982 (Nov 29-Dec 24)	Merlin, Wart, the Seven Dwarfs & the Evil Queen	Carl Fallberg	Tony Strobl & Steve Steere	CS 23
Christmas Comes to Neverland	1983 (Nov 28-Dec 24)	Peter Pan, Wendy, the Lost Boys, Captain Hook, Mr. Smee, the Pirates & the Crocodile	Carl Fallberg	Willie Ito & Bill Langley	CS 24
A Christmas Present for Mister Toad	1984 (Dec 3-22)	Ratty, Mole, Honest John, Gideon & the Coachman	Carl Fallberg	Tony Strobl & Steve Steere	CS 25
Cruella's Very Furry Christmas	1985 (Dec 2-24)	Cruella De Vil, Pongo, Perdita, Jasper & Horace	Floyd Norman	Willie Ito & Mike Royer	CS 26
A Zip-A-Dee-Doo-Dah Christmas!	1986 (Dec 1-24)	Uncle Remus, Br'er Rabbit, Br'er Bear & Br'er Fox	Floyd Norman	Keith Moseley & Larry Mayer	CS 27
Snow White's Sinister Christmas Gift	1987 (Nov 30-Dec 24)	Snow White, the Seven Dwarfs, the Evil Queen & her raven	Carl Fallberg	Keith Moseley & Bill Langley	CS 28

== Disney Holiday Story ==
Disney Holiday Story
- Author(s): Floyd Norman, Karen Kreider
- Illustrator: Richard Moore
- Current status/schedule: Concluded annual Christmas strip
- Launch date: November 30, 1992
- End date: December 27, 1997
- Syndicate(s): King Features Syndicate

The tradition was revived in 1992 to publicize contemporary Disney feature animated films. All six storylines were written by Floyd Norman (with Karen Kreider on the first year), and illustrated by Richard Moore. These stories only included the cast of the featured movie; there were no special crossovers with other characters.

- 1992: Beauty and the Beast (Nov 30-Dec 25)
- 1993: Aladdin (Nov 29-Dec 24)
- 1994: The Lion King (Nov 28-Dec 24)
- 1995: Pocahontas (Nov 27-Dec 23)
- 1996: Hunchback of Notre Dame (Dec 2-28)
- 1997: The Little Mermaid (Dec 1-27, for the film's re-release)
