= Walk on Through: Confessions of a Museum Novice =

Musical by Gavin Creel

Walk on Through
- Confessions of a Museum Novice
- Music: Gavin Creel
- Lyrics: Gavin Creel
- Book: Gavin Creel
- Premiere: November 13, 2023: MCC Theater, New York City
- Productions: 2023 Off-Broadway

Walk on Through: Confessions of a Museum Novice (also known simply as Walk on Through) is a musical by Gavin Creel inspired by the Metropolitan Museum of Art's collections. It is based on a concept originally commissioned by The Met. The original production made its world premiere and Off-Broadway debut at the MCC Theater from November 13, 2023, to January 7, 2024.

== History and development ==
Creel received his commission from the Met in January 2019. The work had a premiere concert presentation in October 2021 at the Met; this performance was also filmed and uploaded on YouTube. In 2022, there were two workshops of the piece at the Eugene O'Neill Theater Center and Pershing Square Signature Center. Creel spoke at length about working on this piece before and during the COVID-19 pandemic.

According to the Companion Guide, referenced artworks are:

- Smashed Strokes Hope by Joan Snyder
- Wisconsin Landscape by John Steuart Curry
- America Today by Thomas Hart Benton
- Autumn Rhythm (Number 30) by Jackson Pollock
- The Organ Rehearsal by Henry Lerolle
- The Storm by Pierre Auguste Cot
- Vsevolod Mikhailovich Garshin (1855-1888) by Ilya Repin (portrait of Vsevolod Garshin)
- Untitled photo by Gregory Crewdson
- Untitled film still #48 by Cindy Sherman
- Soft Figure by Robert Heinecken
- Salvator Mundi by Albrecht Dürer
- Fragmentary Colossal Marble Head of Youth
- Annette by Alberto Giacometti
- The Weeders by Jules Breton
- Judith and the Head of Holofernes by Lucas Cranach the Elder
- From Williamsburg Bridge by Edward Hopper

Creatives have begun working on obtaining permission to licensing rights for there to be future theatrical productions after the Off-Broadway run, with the MET enthusiastically endorsing the project.

== Productions ==
=== Original Off-Broadway production ===
The world premiere was directed by Linda Goodrich and music directed by Madeline Benson. It made its Off-Broadway debut at the MCC Theater. It ran from November 13, 2023, to January 7, 2024. The cast starred Creel alongside Ryan Vasquez, Benson, Chris Peters, and Sasha Allen.

== Musical numbers ==
- "Where Am I?"
- "Walk On Through"
- "Color"
- "Hallelujah"
- "The Journey"
- "Scattered"
- "Sing"
- "What Is This?"
- "The Only One"
- "I Know You"
- "Hands On You"
- "High"
- "Alone Tonight"
- "Judith"
- "Daydreamer"
- "Unfinished World"

== Recordings ==
A live cast album of the show was released on September 30, 2025. It was produced by Madeline Benson, Chris Peters, and Sara Bareilles.

All songs are sung by Gavin Creel and played by the Walk On Through Band.

Walk On Through: Live At MMC track listing
No.	Title	Additional Singer(s)	Length
1.	"Where Am I?"	—	3:11
2.	"Walk On Through"	—	4:41
3.	"Color"	—	4:59
4.	"'Wisconsin Landscape'"	—	1:07
5.	"Hallelujah"	—	1:29
6.	"The Journey"	—	4:47
7.	"'Autumn Rhythm (Number 30)'"	—	1:14
8.	"Scattered"	Ryan Vasquez	4:30
9.	"Sing"	—	5:04
10.	"The Storm"	Ryan Vasquez	0:45
11.	"What Is This?"	Madeline Benson, Chris Peters	3:22
12.	"'Vsevolod Mikhailovich Garshin (1855-1888)' I"	Ryan Vasquez	2:05
13.	"The Only One"	Ryan Vasquez	4:10
14.	"'Vsevolod Mikhailovich Garshin (1855-1888)' II"	Ryan Vasquez	1:07
15.	"I Know You"	Madeline Benson, Chris Peters	6:04
16.	"'Salvator Mundi' I"	—	1:30
17.	"Hands On You"	Chris Peters	6:08
18.	"'Annette'"	—	1:06
19.	"High"	Ryan Vasquez	4:13
20.	"Alone Tonight"	Ryan Vasquez	4:18
21.	"Judith"	Sasha Allen	6:43
22.	"'From Williamsburg Bridge'"	Ryan Vasquez	1:16
23.	"Daydreamer"	Ryan Vasquez	7:19
24.	"'Salvator Mundi' II"	—	0:49
25.	"Unfinished World"	—	4:47
