= Lost & Found in Cleveland =

- Directed by: Marisa Guterman; Keith Gerchak
- Written by: Marisa Guterman; Keith Gerchak
- Produced by: Marisa Guterman; Keith Gerchak
- Starring: Martin Sheen; Dennis Haysbert; June Squibb; Stacy Keach; Loretta Devine; Jon Lovitz; Santino Fontana; Jeff Hiller; Dot-Marie Jones; Liza Weil; Rory O'Malley; Esther Povitsky; Benamin Steinhauser; Yvette Yates Redick; Mark L. Walberg
- Cinematography: Davon Slininger
- Edited by: Tricia Holmes
- Music by: Sven Faulconer
- Production company: Double G Films
- Release date: October 19, 2024 (NBFF)
- Country: United States
- Language: English

Lost & Found in Cleveland is a 2024 American comedy film written, produced, and directed by Marisa Guterman and Keith Gerchak, and starring Martin Sheen, Jeff Hiller, Dennis Haysbert, June Squibb, Stacy Keach, Santino Fontana, Loretta Devine, Jon Lovitz, Dot-Marie Jones, Liza Weil, Rory O'Malley, Esther Povitsky, Benamin Steinhauser, Yvette Yates Redick, and Mark L. Walberg. It is Guterman and Gerchak's feature directorial debut.

== Cast ==
- Martin Sheen as Dr. Austin Raybourne
- Dennis Haysbert as Marty Anderson
- June Squibb as Gladys Sokolowski
- Stacy Keach as Will Sokolowski
- Yvette Yates Redick as Maria Toddy
- Santino Fontana as Gary Lucarelli
- Dot-Marie Jones as Sharon Weymouth
- Loretta Devine as Joy Morris
- Liza Weil as Sophie Mathers
- Esther Povitsky as Sara Levine
- Rory O'Malley as Hugh Robinson
- Jeff Hiller as Graham Hargreaves
- Jon Lovitz as Mayor of Cleveland
- Mark L. Walberg as Host Tom L. Hanks
- Benjamin Steinhauser as Charlie Toddy
- Rob Mayes as Frank
- Vanessa Burghardt as Hannah Mathers

== Production ==
The film was in development since 2017.

Principal photography occurred and wrapped in Cleveland, Ohio, from January to February 2023.

== Release ==
The film's world premiere took place at the Newport Beach Film Festival on October 19, 2024. The film sold out its first screening and a second sold-out screening was added.

The film's Midwestern premiere took place at the Cleveland International Film Festival on March 30, 2025. It "set a record for the largest audience for a single screening in CIFF history and is also the biggest crowd to see a film at Playhouse Square since the Playhouse Square Foundation was established in 1973."
