= Broadway Impact =

Non-profit organization supporting marriage equality

Broadway Impact is an organization of theater industry professionals fighting for marriage equality in the United States. It was founded in December 2008 by Tony-winner Gavin Creel, Tony-nominated Rory O'Malley, and Jenny Kanelos. It is a 501(c)3 charity.

It is the only grassroots organization to mobilize the theater community nationwide in support of marriage equality. Their mission statement reads: "Whether you're gay, straight, or somewhere in between, we believe that you should be able to marry the person you love."

== Events and activism ==
It produced a 3,000-piece letter writing campaign in support of the Marriage Equality Act (New York).

In 2009, held a rally in midtown featuring speeches and/or performances from Cheyenne Jackson, Cynthia Nixon, Kristin Davis, Audra McDonald, David Hyde Pierce, then-Mayor Michael Bloomberg, New York State Senator Tom Duane, and State Assemblyman Daniel O'Donnell.

They also organized a free bus trip for 1,400 volunteers to go to the National Equality March.

In 2010, they threw a celebration when Proposition 8 was ruled unconstitutional that included Hunter Bell, Heidi Blickenstaff and Susan Blackwell from Title of Show, cast members from La Cage aux Folles and Memphis. The evening also included a Question & Answer section with Richard Socarides (Former Advisor to President Bill Clinton).

In 2011, Hair held a "Be-In" performance benefit, and additionally celebrated the recent victory for marriage equality in New York state - that as of July 24 at 9pm, gay couples could officially get married. Several same-sex couples from the Broadway community got married onstage at the St. James Theatre immediately following the performance.

In 2014, they held an "All Love Is Equal" recital.

== Founding ==
Rory O'Malley, Gavin Creel and Jenny Kanelos were at Westway Diner, talking as Proposition 8 was being passed. They said they wanted to do something, so they went to various LGBT organizations, asking them what would be the best thing they could do with a mobilized theater community. With organizations giving no clear direction, they started their own.

O'Malley explained, "We knew there was a rally against marriage equality happening in May of 2009... and we said, 'Well, we have to do something in response,' so we walked into [Broadway Cares/Equity Fights AIDS executive director] Tom Viola's office, and we told him this: 'We have to do something.' He said, 'Okay, well, we'll need a stage. We'll need this, this, this…' We [thought], 'Oh, God.'"
