= Gavin Creel =

American actor, singer and songwriter (1976–2024)

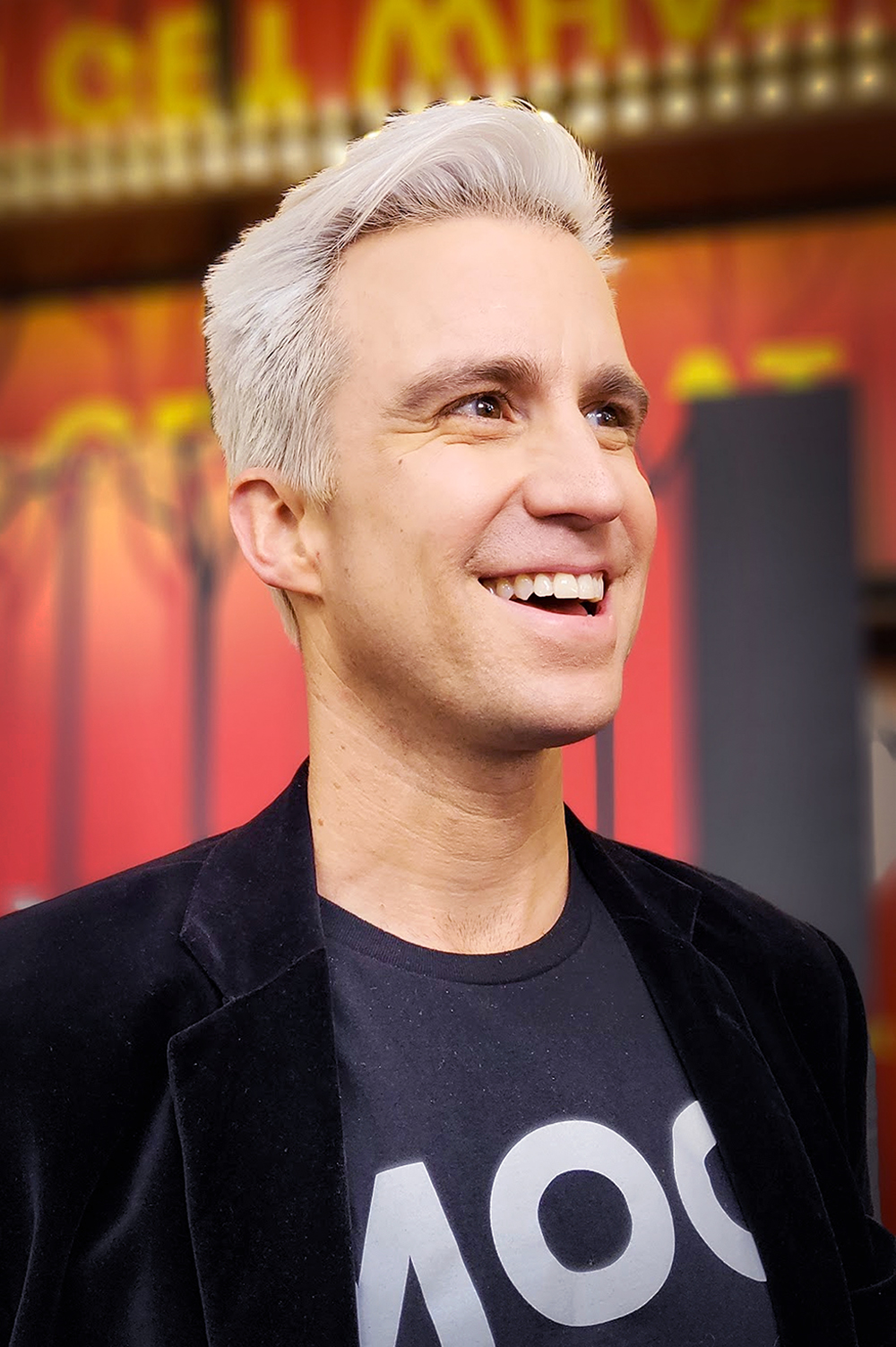
- Creel in 2022
- Born: Gavin James Creel; April 18, 1976; Findlay, Ohio, U.S.
- Died: September 30, 2024 (aged 48); New York City, U.S.
- Education: University of Michigan (BFA)
- Occupations: Actor; singer; songwriter; librettist; producer
- Years active: 1997–2024
- Musical career
- Genres: Pop; musical
- Instrument: Vocals
- Website: www.gavincreel.com

Gavin James Creel (April 18, 1976 – September 30, 2024) was an American actor, singer, and songwriter best known for his work in musical theater. Over his career he received a Grammy Award, a Tony Award, two Drama Desk Awards and a Laurence Olivier Award.

Creel made his Broadway debut in 2002 in the leading role of Jimmy in Thoroughly Modern Millie before starring as Claude in the 2009 Broadway revival of Hair, both Tony Award–nominated performances. From 2012 to 2015, he starred as Elder Price in The Book of Mormon; he received a Laurence Olivier Award for originating the role in the West End version of the musical and played the role in the U.S. National Tour and on Broadway. He received a Tony Award in 2017 for his performance as Cornelius Hackl in Hello, Dolly! on Broadway.

Creel's other stage credits include La Cage aux Folles (2004), She Loves Me (2016), Waitress (2019), and Into the Woods (2022) on Broadway; Mary Poppins (2006), Hair (2010) and Waitress (2020) in the West End; and the national tours of Fame (1998) and Into the Woods (2023). In 2023, Creel's self-written musical, Walk on Through: Confessions of a Museum Novice, had its world premiere Off-Broadway. Primarily a theater actor, his most notable screen acting role is as Bill in Eloise at the Plaza and its Christmas-themed sequel.

== Early life and education ==
Creel was born in Findlay, Ohio, on April 18, 1976. He was raised in a devoutly religious environment which he found highly alienating, and was drawn to theater as a way to escape it. He attended Findlay High School, graduating in 1994. He received his Bachelor of Fine Arts in musical theatre at the University of Michigan School of Music, Theatre & Dance in 1998.

== Career ==
=== 1997–2001: Early career ===
Creel began his professional career in regional theater. Some of his earliest credits are as part of the resident cast of Pittsburgh CLO, a repertory theater, for their 1997 and 1998 seasons; mostly ensemble roles, some of his eight productions there included Kiss Me Kate, La Cage aux Folles, and On the Town.

Following college graduation, Creel played Nick Piazza in the opening cast of 1998 national tour of Fame. In 1998–1999, the tour performed in cities including Toronto, Washington, D.C., and Chicago. Following the tour, he continued to perform in regional theater before moving to New York City in the early 2000s. In 2001, he was the swing in the original off-Broadway production of Bat Boy: The Musical. He also took part in the 2001 workshop of Spring Awakening.

=== 2002–2012: Broadway debut and breakthrough ===
In 2002, Creel made his Broadway debut in the original production of Thoroughly Modern Millie, originating the role of Jimmy Smith opposite Sutton Foster's Millie Dillmount. A breakthrough performance, he was nominated for the Tony Award for Best Performance by a Leading Actor in a Musical. In February 2003, Creel played Prince Eric in a workshop for Disney's stage adaptation of The Little Mermaid. After he departed Thoroughly Modern Millie in April 2003, he performed in the original Chicago production of Stephen Sondheim's Road Show, then titled Bounce, recorded the original cast album for Bright Lights, Big City, among other productions and workshops. Of note, he made his screen acting debut in the 2003 film Eloise at the Plaza and its follow-up Eloise at Christmastime as Bill.

He returned to Broadway in 2004 in the revival of La Cage aux Folles, playing Jean-Michel throughout the production. In 2006, he made his West End debut in Mary Poppins, replacing the original Bert in the production. Also in 2006, he released his debut studio album Goodtimenation. In 2008, Creel was set to star as Jesus alongside Joshua Henry as Judas/John the Baptist and Diana DeGarmo in a Broadway revival of Godspell at the Ethel Barrymore Theatre, but on August 19, it was announced that the show was postponed indefinitely due to the loss of an investor. He returned to Broadway in 2009 in the revival of Hair. For his starring role of Claude, he received his second Tony Award nomination for Best Actor in a Musical. He and the rest of the cast performed in London through 2010 when the production transferred to the West End. Following Hair, he starred in the world premiere of Prometheus Bound at the American Repertory Theater.

=== 2012–2022: Olivier and Tony Awards, continued success and theatre roles ===
From 2012 until 2015, Creel starred in a series of productions of The Book of Mormon. He first starred as Elder Price in the First National Tour of the show in 2012. He subsequently originated the role in the musical's original West End production; for this performance, he was awarded Best Actor in a Musical at the 2014 Laurence Olivier Awards, the most prestigious theatrical awards in the United Kingdom. Following his West End run, he returned to the touring production for a number of months before joining the Broadway cast in 2015. Creel played the suave salesman Steven Kodaly, opposite Jane Krakowski, in the 2016 Broadway revival of She Loves Me. The show was a critical success and the production became the first Broadway show ever to be live-streamed. Since then, the recording has been part of the PBS series Great Performances.

In 2017, he began playing Cornelius Hackl in the Broadway revival of Hello, Dolly! starring Bette Midler and David Hyde Pierce, and later Bernadette Peters and Victor Garber. Santino Fontana temporarily filled in for him while Creel recovered from back surgery from March to May 2018. For his role, Creel was awarded the 2017 Tony Award for Best Actor in a Featured Role in a Musical. In 2019, Creel assumed the role of Dr. Pomatter in the Broadway production of Waitress. He subsequently played the role in the West End production of the musical in 2020. He starred alongside the show's composer Sara Bareilles for both stints.

In 2021, Creel appeared in two episodes of American Horror Stories opposite Matt Bomer and Sierra McCormick on FX on Hulu. On August 29, 2021, Creel was featured in the Public Broadcasting Service (PBS) network's aired concert for the musical Wicked which was hosted by Kristin Chenoweth and Idina Menzel. Other featured artists were Rita Moreno, Cynthia Erivo, Ariana DeBose, Ali Stroker, Amber Riley, Mario Cantone, Jennifer Nettles, Stephanie Hsu, Alex Newell, Isaac Cole Powell, and Gabrielle Ruiz performing many of the musical's numbers.

In May 2022, Creel appeared as The Wolf and Cinderella's Prince in the New York City Center Encores! production and subsequent Broadway revival in June of Into the Woods. He left the production July 23 for two weeks and was filled in for by Cheyenne Jackson and understudy Jason Forbach. He came back for a month and then left again on September 4 for 10 days and was filled in for by Andy Karl, He returned to the production September 16 and stayed with the cast through its closing date January 8, 2023. During the Broadway run he would star opposite Bareilles, Karl, Joshua Henry, Phillipa Soo, Brian d'Arcy James, Patina Miller, Stephanie J. Block, Krysta Rodriguez, Denée Benton, Julia Lester, Sebastian Arcelus, Montego Glover, Diane Phelan, and Joaquina Kalukango. He reprised these roles in the 2023 national tour opposite Glover, Block, Arcelus, Forbach, Phelan, Rodriguez, and Karl.

=== 2023–2024: Walk on Through ===
The first time Creel performed a song from his self-written musical was at Elsie Fest in 2019, where he debuted the song "The Only One". In 2021, Creel performed two shows of a self-described 'concert-cal' called Walk on Through: Confessions of a Museum Novice, for which Creel was commissioned to write and perform the book, music, and lyrics by the Metropolitan Museum of Art. In December 2022, two industry readings of Walk on Through were held at Pershing Square Signature Theatre Center. Creel spoke at length about working on this piece before and during the COVID-19 pandemic.

The show had its world premiere Off-Broadway in November 2023, running from November 13 to January 7, 2024. The cast featured performers Ryan Vasquez, Madeline Benson, Chris Peters, and Sasha Allen. A live recorded cast album of the musical was released on September 30, 2025.

== Personal life ==
Creel divided his time between residences on the Upper West Side of Manhattan and in Carmel, New York.

=== Activism ===
Creel was gay and was heavily involved in gay rights activism. He was one of the founders, with Rory O'Malley and Jenny Kanelos, of Broadway Impact, an LGBT activist group that mobilized the New York theatre community in the pursuit of marriage equality. He was also a regular on the LGBT R FamilyVacations cruise with Rosie O'Donnell. From 2015 until his death, Creel was part of the board of trustees for Broadway Cares/Equity Fights AIDS.

=== Relationships ===
In 2009, Creel dated fellow actor Jonathan Groff. He also dated Broadway actor Henry Gottfried for several years, whom he mentioned in his Tony acceptance speech. At the time of his death, he was in a relationship with Alex Temple Ward.

== Illness and death ==
In July 2024, Creel was diagnosed with metastatic melanotic peripheral nerve sheath sarcoma, a rare form of cancer. He died from the disease under hospice care at his home in Manhattan on September 30, 2024, at the age of 48. Numerous actors who had worked with Creel publicly paid tribute to him.

Theaters in Toronto, the West End and on Broadway announced that they would dim their lights as a tribute to Creel. Initially, only one-third of Broadway's 41 theaters planned towards dimming their lights in honor of Creel, but after public outcry, the tribute was announced to be extended to all Broadway venues. In London, a candlelight vigil was held in Creel's memory at the Actors' Church in Covent Garden on October 6, 2024, with the lights dimming on the four West End theaters he performed in on December 3, 2024. The New York City public memorial service was held at the St. James Theatre on December 2, 2024, with contributions by Gavin's family, colleagues, and members of the Broadway community. This was followed by the dimming of the lights on December 3, 2024.

== Acting credits ==
=== Theatre ===
Adapted from About The Artists and Broadway World.

Year	Show	Role	Venue	Notes	Ref.
1997	Chess	Ensemble	Benedum Center		
1998	Camelot	Ensemble	Benedum Center		
1998	A Funny Thing Happened on the Way to the Forum	Hero	North Shore Music Theatre		
1998–1999	Fame	Nick Piazza	North American Tour		
2000	Honk!	Ugly	North Shore Music Theatre		
2000	Honk!	Ugly	Helen Hayes Performing Arts Center		
2000	A Funny Thing Happened on the Way to the Forum	Hero	California Musical Theatre		
2001	The Flood	Male Lead	Prospect Theatre Company		
2001	Hair	Principal / Father / Tribe	New York City Center, Off-Broadway	Encores! Concert	
2001	Bat Boy: The Musical	Rick / Dillon / Lorraine / Pan / Bud / Daisy	Union Square Theatre, Off-Broadway		
2001	Spring Awakening	Melchior Gabor	Roundabout Theatre Company	Workshop	
2002	Wicked	Boq	Unknown New York Venue	Workshop	
2002–2003	Thoroughly Modern Millie	Jimmy Smith	Marquis Theatre, Broadway	Original cast	
2003	The Little Mermaid	Prince Eric	Unknown New York Venue	Workshop	
2003	Bounce	Hollis Bessemer	Albert Ivar Goodman Theatre, Chicago		
2003	Bounce	Hollis Bessemer	Kennedy Center		
2003	Bright Lights, Big City	Michael	Peter Lewis Auditorium	Concert	
2004	A Tale of Two Cities	Charles Darnay	Unknown New York Venue	Workshop	
2004	The Mystery Plays	Joe Manning	Second Stage Theatre		
2004	The Mystery Plays	Joe Manning	Yale Repertory Theater		
2004	Illyria	Sebastian	Prospect Theatre		
2004	Hair	Performer	New Amsterdam Theatre	Actors' Fund Concert	
2004–2005	La Cage aux Folles	Jean-Michel	Marquis Theatre, Broadway	Original revival cast	
2006	Mary Poppins	Bert	Prince Edward Theatre, West End	Replacement cast	
2009–2010	Hair	Claude Hooper Bukowski	Al Hirschfeld Theatre, Broadway	Original revival cast	
2010	Hair	Claude Hooper Bukowski	Gielgud Theatre, West End	Original revival cast	
2011	Prometheus Bound	Prometheus	American Repertory Theater		
2011	She Loves Me	Steven Kodaly	Stephen Sondheim Theatre	Concert	
2012–2013	The Book of Mormon	Elder Kevin Price	U.S. National Tour	Original tour cast	
2013–2014	The Book of Mormon	Elder Kevin Price	Prince of Wales Theatre, West End	Original cast	
2014	The Book of Mormon	Elder Kevin Price	U.S. National Tour / Toronto		
2015–2016	The Book of Mormon	Elder Kevin Price	Eugene O'Neill Theatre, Broadway	Replacement cast	
2016	She Loves Me	Steven Kodaly	Studio 54, Broadway	Original revival cast	
2017–2018	Hello, Dolly!	Cornelius Hackl	Shubert Theatre, Broadway	Original revival cast	
2018	Thoroughly Modern Millie	Jimmy Smith	Minskoff Theatre, Broadway	Concert	
2018	My One and Only	Captain Billy Buck Chandler	Stephen Sondheim Theatre, Broadway	Concert	
2019	Waitress	Dr. Jim Pomatter	Brooks Atkinson Theatre, Broadway	Replacement cast	
2020	Waitress	Dr. Jim Pomatter	Adelphi Theatre, West End	Replacement cast	
2021	Walk on Through: Confessions of a Museum Novice	Performer/Himself	The Met Museum	Also creator, songwriter, and author	
2022	Walk on Through: Confessions of a Museum Novice	Performer/Himself	Eugene O'Neill Theater Center	Also creator, songwriter, and author	
2022	Walk on Through: Confessions of a Museum Novice	Performer/Himself	Pershing Square Signature Center	Also creator, songwriter, and author	
2022	Into the Woods	The Wolf / Cinderella's Prince	New York City Center, Off-Broadway	Encores!	
2022–2023	Into the Woods	The Wolf / Cinderella's Prince	St. James Theatre, Broadway	Original revival cast	
2023	Into the Woods	The Wolf / Cinderella's Prince	U.S. National Tour	Original tour cast	
2023–2024	Walk on Through: Confessions of a Museum Novice	Performer/Himself	MCC Theater, Off-Broadway	Also creator, songwriter, and author	

=== Television ===
Year	Title	Role	Notes
2003	Eloise at the Plaza	Bill	Television film
2003	Eloise at Christmastime	Bill	Television film
2016	She Loves Me	Steven Kodaly	Filmed Broadway show
2019	Rapunzel's Tangled Adventure	Matthews (voice)	4 episodes
2021	American Horror Stories	Troy	Miniseries; 2 episodes
2021	Central Park	Young Hank Zevansky (voice)	Episode: "The Shadow"
2021	Wicked in Concert	Performer	PBS special

=== Other works ===
- 2016: The Ceiling Fan (producer) • short film
- TBA: The Delicate Medium (associate producer) • short film (released posthumously)

== Discography ==
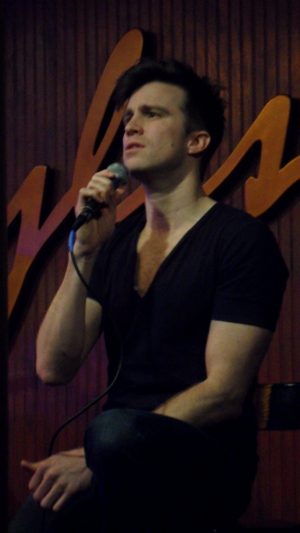
Performing at the Ryles Jazz Club in Boston, Massachusetts, in 2010

=== Solo discography ===
Albums

- 2006: Goodtimenation (Creel/Roth)
- 2012: Get Out (self-released)

EPs

- 2010: Quiet (self-released); No. 44 at the Billboard's Top Heatseekers

Singles

- 2011: "Noise (Equality Now)"
- 2012: "Whitney Houston"

Guest appearances

- 2002: "Lullaby of Broadway" with Marc Kudisch & David Nehls from Broadway Romances Manhattan
- 2005: "'Til Then" from ZEITGEIST by Dan Lipton
- 2007: "Young at Heart" from Over the Rainbow (Universal)
- 2010: "Greenwich Time" from Love on a Summer Afternoon: Songs of Sam Davis (PS Classics)
- 2017: "Christmas Broadway Bus Stop" with Laura Bell Bundy & Eden Espinosa
- 2019: "Do You Hear the Bells?" with The Laurie Berkner Band from Waiting for the Elevator
- 2020: "Witchcraft/I Put a Spell on You" from I Put a Spell on You (Broadway Records)
- 2020: "If It Be Your Will" with Shoshana Bean & Shayna Steele from Sing Your Hallelujah (Shotime Records)
- 2021: "Something Wonderful" from R&H Goes Pop!
- 2021: "A Moment Forever Ago" from Central Park Season Two, The Soundtrack
- 2025: "Take Me Or Leave Me - Live" with Aaron Tveit from MCC Theater's Miscast: The Studio Sessions (Joy Machine Records)

=== Cast recordings ===
- 2002: Thoroughly Modern Millie (RCA Victor)
- 2005: Hair (Actors Fund of America Benefit Recording) (Sh-K-Boom)
- 2005: Bright Lights, Big City (Original Cast Recording) (Sh-K-Boom)
- 2006: It's Only Life (A New Musical Revue) (PS Classics)
- 2009: Hair (New Broadway Cast Recording) (Sh-K-Boom)
- 2011: Fine and Dandy (World Premiere Recording) (PS Classics)
- 2012: Flashdance – The Musical (Roth Music Inc.)
- 2012: Fugitive Songs – A Song Cycle (Warner/Chappell)
- 2016: She Loves Me (2016 Broadway Cast Recording) (Ghostlight Records)
- 2017: Hello, Dolly! (New Broadway Cast Recording) (Masterworks Broadway)
- 2019: Three Points of Contact (Very Intense Records)
- 2019: The Man in the Ceiling (World Premiere Recording) (Ghostlight Records)
- 2022: Into the Woods (2022 Broadway Cast Recording) (Craft Recordings)
- 2025: Walk on Through: Confessions of a Museum Novice (Off-Broadway Live Cast Recording) (Hackl House Records)

== Awards and nominations ==
Year	Award	Category	Work	Result	Ref.
2002	Tony Award	Best Actor in a Musical	Thoroughly Modern Millie	Nominated	
2009	Tony Award	Best Actor in a Musical	Hair	Nominated	
2009	Drama League Award	Distinguished Performance	Hair	Nominated	
2010	GLAAD Media Award	Special Recognition Award (shared with cast)	Hair	Honoree	
2014	Laurence Olivier Award	Best Actor in a Musical	The Book of Mormon	Won	
2014	WhatsOnStage Award	Best Actor in a Musical	The Book of Mormon	Won	
2017	Tony Award	Best Featured Actor in a Musical	Hello, Dolly!	Won	
2017	Drama Desk Award	Outstanding Featured Actor in a Musical	Hello, Dolly!	Won	
2017	Outer Critics Circle Award	Outstanding Featured Actor in a Musical	Hello, Dolly!	Won	
2023	Grammy Awards	Best Musical Theater Album	Into the Woods	Won	
2023	Elliot Norton Awards	Outstanding Visiting Performance in a Musical	Into the Woods	Won	
2023	Broadway.com Audience Choice Awards	Favorite Featured Actor in a Musical	Into the Woods	Won	
2023	Broadway.com Audience Choice Awards	Favorite Onstage Pair (with Joshua Henry)	Into the Woods	Nominated	
2023	Broadway.com Audience Choice Awards	Favorite Funny Performance	Into the Woods	Nominated	
2025	Drama Desk Awards	Lifetime Achievement		Won	

== See also ==
- 2022 Hermitage Fellow at the Hermitage Artist Retreat
- LGBT culture in New York City
- List of LGBT people from New York City
