= Rory O'Malley =

American actor

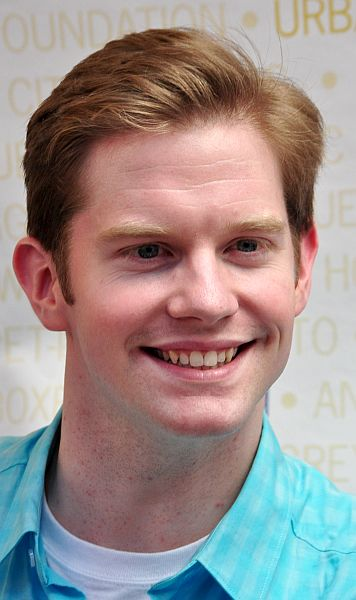
- O'Malley at 13th Annual Broadway Barks Benefit in 2011
- Born: December 23, 1980 (age 45); Cleveland, Ohio, U.S.
- Education: Carnegie Mellon University (BFA)
- Occupation: Actor
- Years active: 1996–present
- Known for: The Book of Mormon, Hamilton
- Spouse: Gerold Schroeder (m. 2014)
- Children: 1
- Website: roryomalley.com

Rory James O'Malley (born December 23, 1980) is an American actor, best known for his performance as Elder McKinley in The Book of Mormon, for which he was nominated for the Tony Award for Best Featured Actor in a Musical at the 65th Tony Awards in 2011. He is a co-founder of the gay rights activist group Broadway Impact.

== Early life ==
Rory O'Malley was born in Cleveland, Ohio; he grew up with his single mother, who is of Irish ancestry. They are Catholic. He graduated from Saint Ignatius High School in Cleveland. O'Malley is a 1997 YoungArts alumnus. In 2003, he received his Bachelors of Fine Arts in acting from Carnegie Mellon University. O'Malley became good friends with actors Josh Gad and Leslie Odom Jr. at Carnegie Mellon University.

== Career ==
=== Film and television ===
O'Malley had a small cameo appearance in On the Run in 2004. His best-known screen appearance was in the 2006 film adaptation of Dreamgirls. He also performed the song "Cadillac Car" on the soundtrack, Dreamgirls: Music from the Motion Picture.

In 2018, he became a series regular on Lifetime's American Princess.

=== Theatre ===
O'Malley starred as Charlie Brown in the 2004 Falcon Theatre production of Snoopy! The Musical, which ran from June 24 to July 18, 2004, in Los Angeles. He starred as Richie Cunningham in the 2006 Los Angeles premiere of Happy Days, as well as the 2007 Goodspeed Opera House production. In October 2008, he appeared alongside Colin Donnell and Laura Osnes in the then Broadway-bound musical Pride and Prejudice as Charles Bingley, at the Eastman Theatre in Rochester, New York.

O'Malley's first appearance on Broadway was in the musical The 25th Annual Putnam County Spelling Bee, replacing actors in the roles of Leaf Coneybear, William Barfee, and Douglas Panch. Regionally, he has appeared in Kiss of the Spider Woman as Valentín Arregui, a Marxist revolutionary; in Charley's Aunt as Charley Wykeham, and Santa Claus Is Coming to Motown as Kris Kringle. His first appearance Off-Broadway was the 2009 revival of Newsical, directed by Mark Waldrop.

He originated the role of Elder McKinley in the musical The Book of Mormon, which opened on Broadway on March 24, 2011. The New York Times reviewer wrote, "But allow me to single out my personal favorites. 'Turn It Off' is a hilarious chorus-line piece about repression, performed by the (all-male Mormon) missionaries and destined to make a star of its lead singer and dancer, Rory O'Malley (whose character is repressed in his own special way)." For this role, O'Malley was nominated for the 2011 Drama Desk Award for Outstanding Featured Actor in a Musical, and was also nominated for the Tony Award for Best Featured Actor in a Musical at the 65th Tony Awards. On July 18, 2011, O'Malley participated in a reading of George Bernard Shaw's play, Fanny's First Play, a satire of theater critics, at the Players Club in Manhattan, New York City. He appeared as Frank Hoover in Little Miss Sunshine at the Off-Broadway Second Stage Theatre from October 2013 to December 2013. O'Malley also participated in the Dustin Lance Black play 8, a chronicle reenactment of the federal case that overturned California's Proposition 8. He replaced Jonathan Groff in the role of King George III in the original Broadway production of Hamilton from April 11, 2016, through January 16, 2017, performing the role on the national tour following his nine-month stint on Broadway.

=== Podcasts ===
O'Malley is the creator and host of the podcast Living the Dream with Rory O'Malley, where he talks to fellow industry people about the reality of being an actor. He created it after joining the Hamilton cast; he realized that young fans of the show were seeing an unrealistic and cultivated depiction of the life of a Broadway actor. The podcast is currently on an indefinite hold, but O'Malley has expressed plans to resume making it.

O'Malley is the host of the Geffen Playhouse's Unscripted.

=== Charity work ===
O'Malley is an active supporter of gay rights, establishing the activism group Broadway Impact in 2009 with Gavin Creel and Jenny Kanelos. O'Malley said in late 2010: "Since its first year, Broadway Impact has held massive rallies for equality in New York City, made thousands of calls through phone banks and even organized 25 buses to Washington, D.C. so that 1,400 people could attend the National Equality March for free. This year we were honored to receive the 2010 Human Rights Campaign Community Award and even participated in the ING New York City Marathon as a charity team. Our team of 12 runners, including myself, raised $38,440 for Broadway Impact!"

On August 15, 2010, O'Malley performed in the benefit concert Sing for the Cure, at Don't Tell Mama in New York City. He was also featured in a Broadway Impact fundraiser on November 2, 2010, hosted by Gavin Creel. Another concert, also benefiting Broadway Impact was held on July 25, 2010. O'Malley participated in the Broadway Sings for Pride concert in June 2011. On July 9, 2011, he joined Mary Tyler Moore, Bernadette Peters and others in the 2011 Broadway Barks adopt-a-thon. In the same year, he was named a Givenik Ambassador. In 2012, he and his spouse Gerold Schroeder were featured in a GAP ad, cheek to cheek, with the caption "BE ONE."

In October 2020, O'Malley joined many other Broadway stars in a virtual voter education and letter-writing party sponsored by VoteRiders to raise awareness about voter ID requirements.

== Personal life ==
A gay man, O'Malley came out at the age of 19. On July 21, 2013, O'Malley announced his engagement to boyfriend Gerold Schroeder via Facebook, and they married on September 28, 2014. Gerold Schroeder is one of three sons of Peter Schroeder, a partner in the law firm Norris Choplin Schroeder in Indianapolis, Indiana. O'Malley announced on November 22, 2018, "after more than two years of paperwork, home studies, joy, heartache, and grace" he and Schroeder had adopted a newborn baby boy. Their son Jimmy O'Malley's adoption was finalized on September 7, 2019.

== Filmography ==
=== Theatre credits ===
Year	Title	Role	Theatre	Notes
2006–07	The 25th Annual Putnam County Spelling Bee	Swing	Circle in the Square Theatre	
2007	Happy Days	Richie Cunningham	Paper Mill Playhouse	
2009–10	Newsical	Performer	47th Street Theatre	
2011	She Loves Me	Arpad Laszlo	Stephen Sondheim Theatre	
2011–13	The Book of Mormon	Elder McKinley / Moroni	Eugene O'Neill Theatre	
2011	8	Ryan Kendall	Eugene O'Neill Theatre	
2013	Nobody Loves You	Chazz / Dominic / Evan	Second Stage Theatre	
2013	Little Miss Sunshine	Frank Ginsberg	Second Stage Theatre	
2016–17	Hamilton	King George III	Richard Rodgers Theatre	
2017–18	Hamilton	King George III	Angelica Company National Tour	
2021–22	Hamilton	King George III	Pantages Theatre	
2022–23	Hamilton	King George III	Philip Company North American Tour	
2023	Gutenberg! The Musical!	Producer	James Earl Jones Theatre	One night cameo
2024	Reefer Madness	Jack Stone/Jesus Christ	25th Anniversary Los Angeles Revival	
2026–27	The Book of Mormon	Elder McKinley / Moroni	Eugene O'Neill Theatre	

=== Film ===
Year	Title	Role	Notes
2006	Dreamgirls	Dave	
2007	Live!	Red Sox Hat Student	
2016	Mother's Day	Customer at Book Signing	
2023	Jess Plus None	Peter	
2024	Lost & Found in Cleveland	Hugh Robinson	

=== Television ===
Year	Title	Role	Notes
1996	Mad TV	Tommy	Episode #1.19
2012	Nurse Jackie	Dave Tyler	Episode: "Day of the Iguana"
2012	Law & Order: Special Victims Unit	Craig	Episode: "Twenty-Five Acts"
2013	1600 Penn	Tour Guide	Episode: "Skip the Tour"
2014	Partners	Michael	10 episodes
2014	The Good Wife	Ren Calder	Episode: "Old Spice"
2015	South Park	Steven Seagal's singing voice, Brian Boyant (voice)	2 episodes
2017	Crazy Ex-Girlfriend	Jarl	Episode: "Josh's Ex-Girlfriend Is Crazy."
2018–2021	Bob's Burgers	Various voices	3 episodes
2019	American Princess	Brian Dooley	Main cast, 10 episodes
2019–2020	Modern Family	Ptolemy	2 episodes
2019–2023	American Dad!	The Riddle Lord (voice)	5 episodes
2020	Grace and Frankie	Jordy	Episode: "The Short Rib"
2020–2022	Central Park	Elwood / Dog Seeker 2 (voice)	21 episodes
2021–2022	Chicago Party Aunt	Daniel Whiddington (voice)	16 episodes
2022	Family Guy	Police Detective No. 2 (voice)	Episode: "Lawyer Guy"
2023	Not Dead Yet	Ben	Episode: "Not Scattered Yet"
2025	High Potential	Brett Lewis	Episode: “Chutes and Murders”

== Awards and nominations ==
Year	Award	Category	Work	Result
2011	Tony Award	Best Featured Actor in a Musical	The Book of Mormon	Nominated
2011	Drama Desk Award	Outstanding Featured Actor in a Musical	The Book of Mormon	Nominated
2016	Broadway.com Audience Award	Favorite Replacement (Male)	Hamilton	Nominated

== See also ==
- LGBT culture in New York City
- List of LGBT people from New York City
- NYC Pride March
