= Bright Lights, Big City (musical) =

Rock musical by Paul Scott Goodman

Bright Lights, Big City is a rock musical with music, lyrics and book written by Scottish composer Paul Scott Goodman based on the 1984 novel by Jay McInerney. It follows a week in the life of Jamie, a successful young writer who loses himself in the chaos of 1980s New York City. The piece premiered Off-Broadway in New York City in 1999 and was revived in a small London production in 2010.

== Plot ==
Jamie, a twenty-four-year-old who came to New York City to fulfill his dream of being a writer, now finds himself in a frightfully boring job in the "factual verification department" of Gotham Magazine under tight-lipped boss Clara. Jamie soon discovers the party-scene of New York where he meets characters like Tad, who brings Jamie into a world of cocaine, sex and all-night partying at the Odeon club. Jamie indulges but eventually finds himself spinning out of control. His wife Amanda, a model, leaves him to follow her dream in Paris. He loses touch with his brother, Michael, who is left confused and alone since the death of their mother, and Jamie loses his job.

Drugs and partying get the better of Jamie, as he starts to be haunted by hallucinations, while Chuck Bean, the number one reporter in town, worms his way into Jamie's brain. Jamie spirals out of control as the hallucinations and reality start to crumble.

Tad introduces Jamie to his cousin, Vicky. It is meant to be nothing but a one-night engagement, but Jamie finds himself drawn to the rationality, innocence and philosophical tendencies of Vicky. He soon decides to turn his life around, forgetting about Amanda, deserting Tad, reconnecting with Michael, being with Vicky and finally restarting the novel he once gave up on.

== Productions ==
The show first opened at the New York Theatre Workshop on 24 February 1999. It was directed and musically staged by Michael Greif, with orchestrations and musical direction by Richard Barone. It starred Patrick Wilson as Jamie, Jerry Dixon as Tad, Napiera Daniele Groves as Amanda, Annmarie Milazzo as the Mother, John Link Graney as Michael and Natascia Diaz as Vicky. The show opened to mixed reviews, many of which compared it unfavorably with Rent, which was created at the same theatre with almost entirely the same creative team, minus Jonathan Larson.

On the concept cast recording, the cast included Patrick Wilson (Jamie), Christine Ebersole (Clara), Sherie Rene Scott (Vicky), Jesse L. Martin (Tad), Eden Espinosa (Druggie/Coma Baby), Celia Keenan-Bolger (Mary O'Brien Mchann), Sharon Leal (Amanda), Anne Marie Milazzo (Mother), and Gavin Creel (Michael).

The show had its professional UK premiere in November 2010 at Hoxton Hall, London, starring Paul Ayres (Jamie), Matthew Gent (Michael), Lori Haley Fox (Mother), Rachael Wooding (Amanda), Jodie Jacobs (Vicky), George Maguire (Tad), Rietta Austin (Coma Baby/Clara), Stuart Armfield (Alex), Oliver Roll (Chuck Bean) and Mary Cormack (Mary O'Brien McCann). It was produced by Sue Knox for This Stage Ltd, directed by Christopher Lane and choreographed by Fabian Aloise.

== Musical numbers ==
- 'Bright Lights, Big City' – Chuck Bean, Jamie, Drug Girl & Ensemble
- 'Back In The City' – Tad, Jamie & Ensemble
- 'Sunday Morning 6AM' – Jamie, Chuck Bean, Mary, Mother Amanda & Ensemble.
- 'Coma Baby' – Coma Baby, Chuck Bean, Jamie & Ensemble
- 'Fact & Fiction' – Clara, Jamie & Ensemble
- 'I Hate The French' – Jamie & Employee
- 'Brother' – Michael, Amanda & Jamie
- 'I Hate The French (Reprise)' – Jamie
- 'Odeon' – Jamie, Tad & Ensemble
- 'Happy Birthday Darling' – Mother
- 'Missing' – Coma Baby, Mary & Jamie
- 'To Model' – Amanda & Jamie
- 'So Many Little Things' – Jamie, Mother, Michael & Ensemble
- 'Back In The City 2' – Tad
- 'Kindness' – Vicky
- 'Perfect Feeling' – Jamie, Vicky & Ensemble
- 'Bright Lights, Big City 2' – Jamie
- 'You Couldn't Handle It Jamie' – Clara & Jamie
- 'How About Dinner At My Place?' -- Female Employee & Jamie (Omitted from Cast Recording but used in alternative productions)
- 'My Son' – Clara & Jamie (alternatively, Female Employee & Jamie)
- 'Wednesday' – Chuck, Tad & Jamie
- 'Camera Wall' – Amanda, Chuck Bean, Jamie, Mother, Michael, Mary, Coma Baby & Ensemble
- 'Heart And Soul' – Michael, Vicky & Mother
- 'Brother 2' – Michael & Jamie
- 'Mummies At The Met' – Mother, Jamie, Coma Baby, Mary & Ensemble
- 'Are You Still Holding My Hand?' – Mother
- 'Brother 3' Jamie & Michael
- 'Back In The City 3' – Tad & Ensemble
- 'Stay In My Life' – Jamie, Amanda, Vicky & Ensemble
- 'Bright Lights Big City 3 / Wordfall' – Jamie & Ensemble
