= Big Bad Wolf =

Fairy tale character

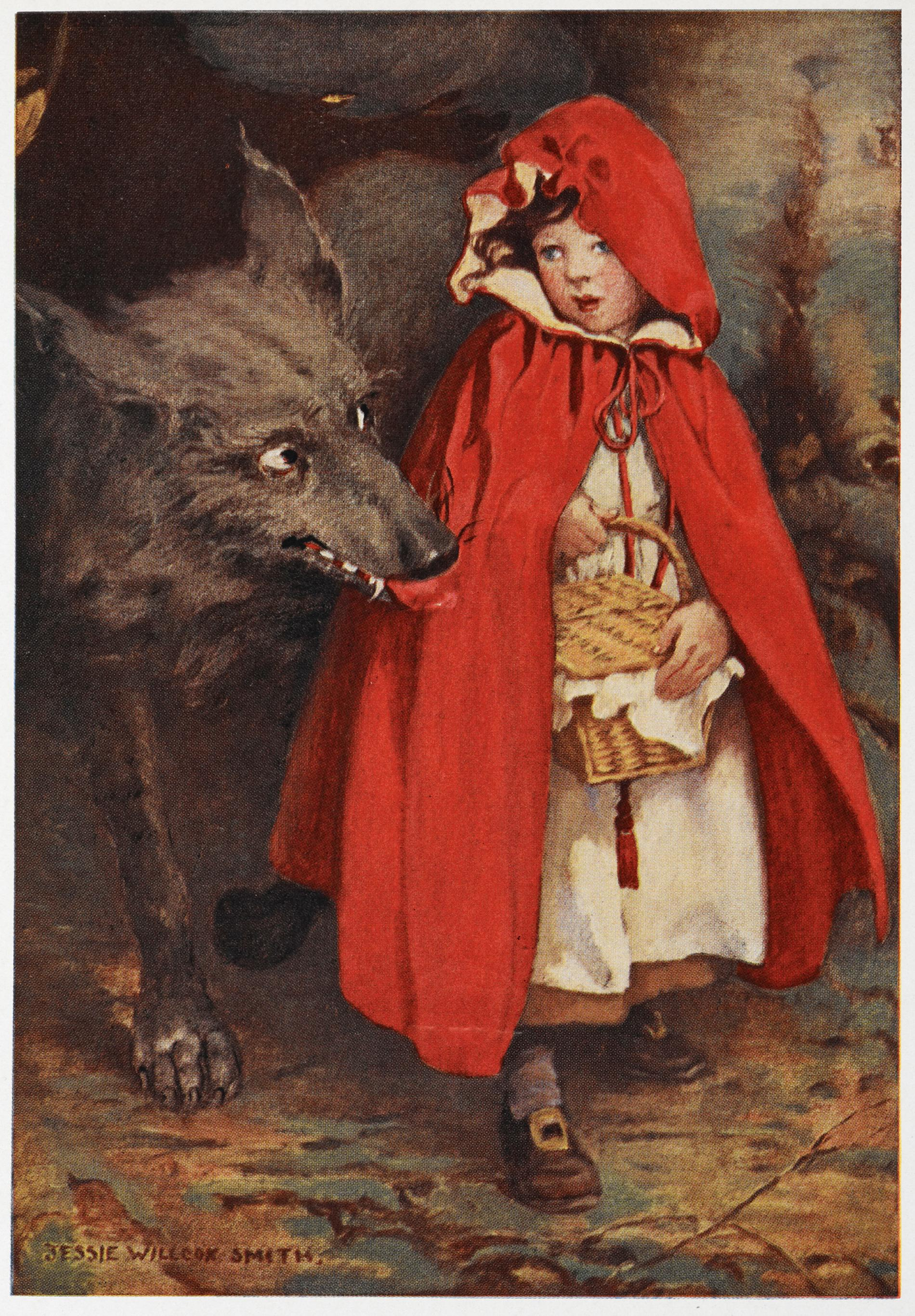
A depiction of the Big Bad Wolf with Little Red Riding Hood by Jessie Willcox Smith

The Big Bad Wolf is a fictional wolf appearing in several cautionary tales, including some of Grimms' Fairy Tales. Versions of this character have appeared in numerous works, and it has become a generic archetype of a menacing predatory antagonist.

== Interpretations ==
"Little Red Riding Hood", "The Three Little Pigs", "The Wolf and the Seven Young Goats", "The Boy Who Cried Wolf" and the Russian tale Peter and the Wolf, reflect the theme of the ravening wolf and of the creature released unharmed from its belly, but the general theme of restoration is very old.

The dialogue between the wolf and Little Red Riding Hood has its analogies to the Norse Þrymskviða from the Elder Edda; the giant Þrymr had stolen Mjölner, Thor's hammer, and demanded Freyja as his bride for its return. Instead, the gods dressed Thor as a bride and sent him. When the giants note Thor's unladylike eyes, eating, and drinking, Loki explains them as Freyja not having slept, or eaten, or drunk, out of longing for the wedding.

19th-century Folklorists and cultural anthropologists such as P. Saintyves and Edward Burnett Tylor saw Little Red Riding Hood in terms of solar myths and other naturally occurring cycles, stating that the wolf represents the night swallowing the sun, and the variations in which Little Red Riding Hood is cut out of the wolf's belly represent the dawn. In this interpretation, there is a connection between the wolf of this tale and Skoll or Fenrir, the wolf in Norse mythology that will swallow the sun at Ragnarök.

Ethologist Dr. Valerius Geist of the University of Calgary, Alberta wrote that the fable was likely based on genuine risk of wolf attacks at the time. He argues that wolves are in fact dangerous predators, and fables served as a valid warning not to enter forests where wolves were known to live, and to be on the look out for such. Both wolves and wilderness were treated as enemies of humanity in that region and time.

== Folkloric appearances ==
- "The Boy Who Cried Wolf" (Aesop)
- "Little Red Riding Hood" (Charles Perrault\Brothers Grimm)
- "The Wolf and the Seven Young Goats" (Brothers Grimm)
- "The Three Little Pigs" (Joseph Jacobs)
- "Peter and the Wolf" (Sergei Prokofiev)

== Modern standard adaptations ==
=== Disney version ===
Big Bad Wolf
- Disney's version of the Big Bad Wolf
- First appearance: Three Little Pigs (May 27, 1933)
- Created by: Walt Disney
- Voiced by: Billy Bletcher (1933–1941); Pinto Colvig (Three Little Pigs, as Jewish Peddler); Jimmy MacDonald (1948, 1958, 1961); Will Ryan (1981–1983); Tony Pope (1988); Jim Cummings (1988–2020); Gregg Berger (2002); Clancy Brown (2020–present)
- Developed by: Norman Ferguson; Art Babbitt; Fred Moore

In-universe information
- Full name: Zeke Midas Wolf (real name)
- Alias: Br'er Wolf
- Species: Florida Black wolf
- Gender: Male
- Significant other: Marie-Loup (1990s comics)
- Children: Three Little Wolves and Li'l Wolf (sons)
- Relatives: Izzy Wolf (nephew); Zeb (brother)

The Big Bad Wolf, also known as Zeke Midas Wolf or Br'er Wolf, is a fictional character from Walt Disney's cartoon short Three Little Pigs, directed by Burt Gillett and first released on May 27, 1933. The Wolf's voice was provided by Billy Bletcher. As in the folktale, he was a cunning and threatening menace. The short also introduced the Wolf's theme song, "Who's Afraid of the Big Bad Wolf?", written by Frank Churchill.

The Wolf is shown as wearing a top hat, red pants, green suspenders and white gloves. However, he does not wear a shirt or shoes. The Wolf has a taste for disguising himself, but both the audience and the Practical Pig can easily see through the Wolf's disguises. With each successive short, the Wolf exhibits a fondness for dressing in drag and, even "seduces" Fiddler and Fifer Pigs, who become increasingly clueless as to his disguises with each installment, with such disguises as "Goldilocks the Fairy Queen", Little Bo Peep and a mermaid.

In an interview with Melvyn Bragg in the early 1980s, the British actor Laurence Olivier said that Disney's Big Bad Wolf was supposedly based on a widely detested American theatre director and producer called Jed Harris. When Olivier produced a film version of Shakespeare's Richard III, he based some of his mannerisms on Harris, and his physical appearance on the wolf.

The short was so popular that Walt Disney produced several sequels, which also featured the Wolf as the villain. The first of them was named after him: The Big Bad Wolf, also directed by Burt Gillett and first released on April 14, 1934. In the next of the sequels, Three Little Wolves (1936), he was accompanied by three just-as-carnivorous sons. (These three sons were later reduced to just one who, in contrast to his father, was full of goodness and charm and a friend of the Three Little Pigs.) The fourth cartoon featuring the Three Little Pigs and the Wolf, The Practical Pig, was released in 1939. During World War II, a final, propaganda cartoon followed, produced by The National Film Board of Canada: The Thrifty Pig (1941).

At the end of each short, the Wolf is dealt with by the resourceful thinking and hard work of Practical Pig. In the original short, he falls into a boiling pot prepared by the pigs. In The Big Bad Wolf, Practical pours popcorn and hot coals down his pants. In the final two shorts, Practical invents an anti-Wolf contraption to deal with the Wolf, who is shown to be powerless against the marvels of modern technology. The "Wolf Pacifier" in Three Little Wolves entraps him, chases him with a buzz-saw, hits his head with rolling pins, kicks him in the butt with boots, punches his face with boxing gloves, and finally tars and feathers him before firing him out of a cannon, all accomplished automatically and in time to a version of "Who's Afraid of the Big Bad Wolf?". In The Practical Pig, the wolf falls into Practical Pig's trap and is subjected to the Lie Detector, which washes his mouth out with soap, whacks his hands with rulers, or pulls down his pants and spanks him when he tells a lie. The machine's punishment grows harsher and harsher the more he lies, until it is finally spinning him around, smacking his head and scrubbing his bottom. When he finally tells the truth, he is shot away by a rocket stuck up his shirt.

The Big Bad Wolf also made appearances in other Disney cartoons. In Toby Tortoise Returns, Practical and the Wolf made cameo appearances during the boxing match between Toby Tortoise and Max Hare. The Wolf also appeared in Mickey's Polo Team, as part of a game of Polo between four of Disney's animated characters (one of whom was the Wolf) and four animated caricatures of noted film actors.

He also appeared in Mickey's Christmas Carol, dressed as a streetcorner Santa Claus at the beginning of the featurette.

The Wolf made a couple of brief cameo appearances in Who Framed Roger Rabbit, first hiding behind a lamppost in Toontown, and later at the end of the film when all the toons are gathered, wearing a sheep costume and mask which he instantly stripped off to reveal his true wolfish features. He was voiced by Tony Pope in this one (who was perhaps well known for providing the voice of the original Furby).

The Wolf made a couple of brief cameo appearances in The Lion King 1½, first along with many silhouettes of Disney title characters coming into the theater in the original of the ending scene.

==== Comics ====
In 1936, Disney's Big Bad Wolf came to Sunday newspaper comics, which were reformatted and reprinted in the monthly Walt Disney's Comics and Stories in 1941. They were popular enough there that a demand for new Big Bad Wolf comics arose. From 1945, the original WDC&S series Li'l Bad Wolf nominally starred Big Bad Wolf's good little cub, but "Pop" repeatedly stole the spotlight. Carl Buettner, Gil Turner and Jack Bradbury were among the noted creators to work on the series in its early years, with Buettner giving Big Bad Wolf his proper name of Zeke (1946) and Turner supplying his middle name of Midas (1949).

In the comics, Big Bad Wolf generally wants his son to become a villain like himself; but, unlike the three little wolves who appeared in the shorts, the gentle Li'l Bad Wolf does not live up to his father's expectations. Indeed, Li'l Bad is friends with the Pigs, Thumper, and other forest characters whom the comics portray as Zeke's intended prey. A running gag in the comics typically comes when in trying to catch the Pigs, Zeke runs afoul of Br'er Bear, who ends up pounding "Br'er Wolf" for one offense or another. Another gag is that Br'er/Zeke Wolf never succeeds at anything such as camping or stealing farm products. Once he actually catches a duck for dinner but it ends up tasting awful; later he catches a whole pack of ducks, which turn out to be mud hens. In a different comic he catches chickens twice (once by accident) but still loses as usual. In Disney's comics his appearance is slightly different than original: he usually wears an all-blue clothing but white gloves; and his son follows the same pattern of his father clothes, but he uses red instead of blue.

===== Disney's Li'l Bad Wolf =====
Li'l Bad Wolf (or just Li'l Wolf as referred to by his friends) is Zeke "Big Bad" Wolf's son. In spite of his name, Li'l Bad Wolf wants to be a good little wolf; badness is really the domain of his father. Zeke wants his son to be just as bad as he is, but the kindhearted (or, at worst, naive) Li'l Wolf, despite wanting to please his father, cannot bring himself to do others harm. Even worse for Zeke, Li'l Wolf's best friends are the Three Little Pigs themselves, and he constantly saves them from his father's appetite. Despite disappointing his father, Zeke Wolf was shown to be very fond of his son, and Li'l Wolf of his father.

Li'l Wolf debuted in his own self-titled series, beginning in the comic book Walt Disney's Comics and Stories #52 (1945). The first story was written by Dorothy Strebe and illustrated by Carl Buettner. The feature ran regularly through 1957, when it temporarily moved to the back pages of Mickey Mouse. Li'l Wolf returned to Comics and Stories in 1961, after which he continued to appear there frequently through 2008. Li'l Wolf has in fact starred in more issues of Comics and Stories than any other character except for Mickey Mouse and Donald Duck.

Apart from Comics and Stories and Mickey Mouse, Li'l Wolf has also appeared in many different Disney anthology comic books, including a number of giant-size specials and a series of one-page text stories in Donald Duck.

Zeke and Li'l Bad Wolf were also frequently featured in the stories produced in Denmark and the Netherlands.

Li'l Bad Wolf's only comic strip appearance was in the Disney Christmas Story for 1963, "Three Little Pigs Christmas Story". This sequence was drawn by Floyd Gottfredson, who reinstated Li'l Wolf's sharp teeth.

From 2003 to 2008, reflecting a trend initiated in European Disney comics, Zeke Wolf increasingly often featured as the title character in new stories himself, although Li'l Wolf continued to play a minor role.

Li'l Wolf's first animated appearance was in the Raw Toonage short "The Porker's Court", with a physical appearance similar to his father. However, he later appeared, in a more traditional role, in a self-titled short on House of Mouse. The voice for the animated Li'l Wolf in House of Mouse was provided by Sam Gifaldi. Li'l Wolf is not to be confused with the Three Little Wolves, Big Bad Wolf's three mischievous sons who appeared in the cartoon shorts The Three Little Wolves and The Practical Pig, although he closely resembles them.

==== TV series appearances ====
Along with other Disney characters, the Big Bad Wolf appears in the animated opening of the television series The Mickey Mouse Club.

In the series Bonkers, the Big Bad Wolf appears in the episode "The 29th Page" at a prison line-up along with other Disney criminals, and in "CasaBonkers" where Katya tosses him out of his car so she can go after Bonkers.

The Big Bad Wolf has been a recurring character in House of Mouse, where he is voiced by Jim Cummings. His first appearance on this show featured him as a jazz artist called "Big Bad Wolf Daddy" (a parody of Big Bad Voodoo Daddy), performing a swing version of his song with the Pigs as his backup band (they are under a contract that states he will eat them if they do not play for him). In this episode, his tendency to destroy houses by exhaling is shown to be an allergy-like reaction to the sight of a door. Later appearances on House of Mouse, however, returned the Wolf to his more traditional role; one episode even featured a newly made short starring the character, based on the aforementioned Li'l Bad Wolf comic stories. Apart from the series appearances, Big Bad Wolf was one of the villains in the direct-to-video film Mickey's House of Villains.

In the TV short series Mickey Mouse, the Big Bad Wolf appears in the episode "Sock Burglar", as one of the villains suspected of stealing the town's socks, and in "The Perfect Dream" as a rogue biker. In the spinoff series The Wonderful World of Mickey Mouse, he is a central character in the episode "The Big Good Wolf" (voiced by Clancy Brown), where Mickey tries to reform him, but while characters are found that can help him be good, he ends up devouring them one by one, until Mickey manages to rescue them from his stomach.

==== Other appearances ====
As a walkaround costumed character, Big Bad Wolf appears at the Walt Disney Parks and Resorts for meet-and-greets, parades and shows.

In the video game Magical Tetris Challenge, Big Bad Wolf is one of Pete's henchmen, along with a Weasel and is the boss the player fights before Pete, the final boss. His levels theme seems to be a disco remix, with him wearing a purple top hat with a matching tailcoat, white dress shirt, red bow tie, purple trousers and brown Oxfords.

The Big Bad Wolf also appeared in the Kingdom Keepers series, in the fourth book, "Power Play", where he appeared non anthropomorphized. In the book, he attempted to eat Pluto and the main characters, Finn and Amanda. He ends up falling into the Rivers of America.

The Big Bad Wolf makes a cameo on an Old West Wanted poster in Disney Magical World 2.

The character has also appeared as a playable character in video games such as Disney Sorcerer's Arena and Disney Magic Kingdoms.

=== Nu Pogodi! ===
In the Soviet animated series Nu Pogodi, the wolf, commonly translated into English as Volk (Russian: Волк), is portrayed as a hooligan who eagerly turns to vandalism, abuses minors, breaks laws and is a heavy smoker. His adventures revolve around constant failures to capture a Hare. On the other hand, many of Wolf's attempts to catch Hare are often characterized by uncanny abilities on his part (including figure skating, ballet and waltzing) which demonstrate his more refined side. Wolf can also play the guitar very well and ride the powerful rocker motorbike, making his character more sophisticated than a normal hooligan.

In the first episode, while climbing a high building to catch Hare, Wolf whistles the popular mountaineer song, "Song of a Friend" (the signature song of Vladimir Vysotsky). In spite of these talents, most of Wolf's schemes eventually fail or turn against him. The character was originally voiced by Anatoli Papanov.

=== Revolting Rhymes ===
In the book Revolting Rhymes, by famous writer Roald Dahl, the Big Bad Wolves from "Little Red Riding Hood" and "Three Little Pigs" appear. In the book's version of "Little Red Riding Hood", the Big Bad Wolf devours grandma like the story and an unfooled Little Red Riding Hood uses her concealed pistol to shoot him dead. She managed to make a wolfskin coat from him.

In the book's version of "Three Little Pigs", the Big Bad Wolf devoured the two pigs after blowing down the house. Failing to blow down the third pig's brick house, the Wolf threatens to come back later with dynamite, intending to blow it up instead. The third pig enlists Little Red Riding Hood to deal with this wolf and she does so in the same way as she did the other wolf.

In the film adaption, a Wolf (voiced by Dominic West) serves as a storyteller to Little Red Riding Hood's children after incapacitating their intended babysitter Mrs. Hunt. He has two nephews named Rolf (voiced by Rob Brydon) and Rex (voiced by David Walliams). Rolf was the one who ate Little Red Riding Hood's grandmother following a falling out with his uncle and is killed by Little Red Riding Hood who later skinned him for a wolf-skin coat. Rex eats the Banker Pig's brothers and is killed by Little Red Riding Hood when he tries to use dynamite on his bank. Once Little Red Riding Hood's children are asleep after the story, the Wolf decides not to exact revenge for his dead nephews and leaves the house wishing Little Red Riding Hood a good night. After exiting the bus, the Wolf sheds Mrs. Hunt's clothes and runs into the woods.

=== Into the Woods ===
The Big Bad Wolf is a minor character in the 1987 Broadway musical Into the Woods by Stephen Sondheim and James Lapine. The Big Bad Wolf was portrayed by Robert Westenberg in the original Broadway cast and Chuck Wagner in the first national tour. The 2002 Broadway revival featured the Wolves from Little Red Riding Hood and The Three Little Pigs. They were portrayed by Gregg Edelman and Christopher Sieber, respectively. Gavin Creel portrayed the role in the original cast of the 2022 Broadway revival, Cheyenne Jackson and Andy Karl both replaced Creel in the role for limited runs.

The musical was adapted into a film by Walt Disney Pictures and directed by Rob Marshall, where Johnny Depp played the role of the Big Bad Wolf.

=== Happily N'Ever After ===
The film Happily N'Ever After featured three Big Bad Wolves. The Fat Wolf (voiced by Jon Polito) is the alpha of the Big Bad Wolves and based on the Big Bad Wolf from "The Wolf and the Seven Young Goats". The Tough Wolf (voiced by Tom Kenny) is the second-in-command, is based on the Big Bad Wolf from "Three Little Pigs", and is often competing with the Fat Wolf. The Crazy Wolf, based on the Big Bad Wolf from "Little Red Riding Hood", does not speak and is the runt of the litter.

=== Dimension 20 Neverafter ===
In the actual play show Dimension 20's 15th season, the Big Bad Wolf is the manifestation of Death in the world of the Neverafter, who, after meeting with a starving Little Red Riding Hood, allows her to kill him, and eat his flesh, turning her into a werewolf. When the wolf passes, Little Red is left to "take up the mantle of Death", turning into a full wolf.

== Modern positive adaptations ==
Several recent interpretations of the Big Bad Wolf show him as being a character with relatively good intentions, mostly considered "Bad" due to a misunderstanding or prejudice. Arguably, this practice started with the 1989 children's book The True Story of the 3 Little Pigs! However, the best-known "good" adaptations are from films, where it is mostly used for a comedic effect.

=== The True Story of the 3 Little Pigs! ===
The story as told by Alexander T. Wolf from The Three Little Pigs suggests that wolves may not necessarily have to be "Big" and "Bad", but are perhaps misunderstood because what they eat happens to be cute. It should be inferred, however, that the following story given by Alexander T. Wolf is merely a fiction made up to conceal his guilt. Alexander T. Wolf, portrayed as rather civil, had a cold. He was baking a cake for his grandmother's birthday and the wolf had to travel to the little pigs' houses to borrow a cup of sugar. Each time the pigs turned him away, Alexander T. Wolf's cold caused him to huff and puff and sneeze a great sneeze whereupon the wolf would accidentally destroy the pig's house. Finding the inhabitant deceased, Alexander T. Wolf decided to eat the body so as not to let good meat go to waste, since the pig was dead anyway. The final pig's house was not blown down and Alexander T. Wolf went into an excessive sneezing fit while the pig allegedly insulted his grandmother. The authorities came and dragged a furious and flustered wolf away and locked him up in prison. It is from prison where Alexander T. Wolf is now telling his (not entirely convincing) story as the news reports have found out about the two dead pigs he ate and jazzed up their story. Now labeled the "Big Bad Wolf", Alexander T. Wolf stated that he was framed. The story ended with a white-bearded Alexander T. Wolf quoting "But maybe you can loan me a cup of sugar".

=== Looney Tunes' Big Bad Wolf ===
The Looney Tunes series used the Big Bad Wolf as a stock character in several of its shorts, widely varying in its portrayal depending on the short's storyline. In the 1957 short Three Little Bops, the wolf (voiced by Stan Freberg) plays a trumpet rather badly while instrument playing pigs engage in club hopping using clubs made of straw, sticks, and bricks. There is also a version appearing mostly in Bugs Bunny cartoons such as Little Red Riding Rabbit, The Windblown Hare (in which he is voiced by Billy Bletcher and Jim Backus, respectively), and many more. This was a more humorous wolf, being somewhat stupid and prone to anger. In Pigs in a Polka, the wolf is portrayed as a master of disguise, dressing as a gypsy and a beggar to fool the Three Little Pigs. A typical gag in these stories would have a sign poke into the foreground, stating, "IT'S THE BIG, BAD WOLF", whereupon the wolf would angrily shove it away, saying, "Oh, all right, knock it off! They know who I am!" A different version of the Big Bad Wolf was a friend of Sylvester and antagonist of Tweety in the short Red Riding Hoodwinked.

=== Hanna-Barbera's Loopy de Loop ===
The only theatrical short subject cartoon series produced by Hanna-Barbera after they left MGM and formed their own studio, Loopy de Loop is cast as a tuque-topped, kind-hearted wolf who speaks with a bad French Canadian accent, and whose kind-hearted attempts to assist almost always ended up by being rejected by those he sought to help-or something slightly worse.

=== Hoodwinked! ===
The Weinstein Company's animated films Hoodwinked! and Hoodwinked Too! Hood vs. Evil features the Wolf as a misunderstood Fletch-type investigative journalist voiced by Patrick Warburton. The Wolf, whose full name is Wolf W. Wolf, works undercover assignments. His assistant and cameraman is a hyperactive squirrel named Twitchy and he writes a column for The Once Upon a Times. His reason for stalking Red Puckett is not to eat her, but rather to get information from her about a mysterious thief striking this part of the woods.

=== Shrek ===
The animated Shrek film series reversed many conventional roles found in fairy tales, including depicting the Big Bad Wolf (voiced by Aron Warner) from "Little Red Riding Hood" as a friendly, misunderstood cross-dresser (apparently still wearing the girl's Grandmother's clothes) and on good terms with the Three Little Pigs. This depiction, and Pinocchio's expansive nose, in Shrek 2 raised the ire of some groups who objected to the film's sexual content, in what is billed as a children's film.

In Puss in Boots: The Last Wish, a variation of the Big Bad Wolf (voiced by Wagner Moura) appears as one of the personification of death, who wishes to kill Puss in Boots and remove his last life, as he believes he has wasted the others.

In the fighting game Shrek SuperSlam, released in 2005, Big Bad Wolf is a playable character and appears as "Huff n Puff Wolf".

=== Sesame Street ===
The Big Bad Wolf has become a regularly recurring puppet character on Sesame Street, appearing usually in purple fur (although he originally had blue shaggy fur, as he was a variant of Herry Monster). Besides the purple and blue variants, there were also green and white versions of the Big Bad Wolf. He is generally performed by Jerry Nelson (particularly the blue version) and occasionally performed by Tyler Bunch, Kevin Clash, Joey Mazzarino, Martin P. Robinson, David Rudman, and Matt Vogel.

In episode 3001, the music number "Bad Wolf" showed the Big Bad Wolf (performed by David Rudman) with his family which consists of his mother Big Glad Wolf (performed by Louise Gold), his father Well-Clad Wolf (performed by Jerry Nelson), his brother Big Rad Wolf (performed by Joey Mazzarino), his sister Big Sad Wolf (performed by Camille Bonora), his aunt Big Grad Wolf (performed by Fran Brill), and his uncle Big Mad Wolf (performed by Martin P. Robinson).

In episode 4035, the Big Bad Wolf is shown to have a brother named Leonard Wolf (performed by Jerry Nelson), who tells Elmo and Rosita that not all wolves are the same.

In episode 4219, the Big Bad Wolf works in the hair-drying salon after telling Elmo and Telly Monster that he is no longer in the pig-chasing business.

In episode 4266, the Big Bad Wolf huffs and puffs Slimey the Worm when he is unable to catch the Three Little Pigs not realizing the harm he is doing to Slimey. When he does realize this thanks to Alan, Big Bird. Mr. Snuffleupagus, and Oscar the Grouch, the Big Bad Wolf apologizes to Slimey and starts a hobby of bubble blowing.

The puppet for the purple variant of the Big Bad Wolf appeared in The Furchester Hotel as different characters.

=== Fables ===
The comic book series Fables by Bill Willingham features a reformed Big Bad Wolf as a major character, commonly referred to as "Bigby". In order to pass for human, (the other animal fables want nothing to do with him), he has been infected with lycanthropy, making him, in essence, a werewolf. He acts as sheriff for the Fable community, going by the name of Bigby Wolf. He is often portrayed as a typical film-noir-style trenchcoat-wearing detective. In the context of the series, he earned the name "Big Bad" after his (much larger) siblings sarcastically noted his drive to be ferocious, particularly after his father, the incarnation of the North Wind, left his mother due to a wind's nature of having to move, else the wind would never reach other lands. Due to his unique parentage, his infamous "huff 'n puff" is a form of wind control that has been shown to be powerful enough to smash trees down, blow out an army of flaming animated puppetmen, and Bigby once conjectured that even a brick house would most likely be blown to bits by it. Bigby Wolf serves as the main protagonist and player character of the 2013 video game adaptation of Fables, The Wolf Among Us. He is shown to have four forms—fully human, still mostly human but with wolf eyes, fangs, claws, and higher strength, a humanoid wolf of still greater strength, and a towering four-legged wolf possessing immense power and speed.

=== The 10th Kingdom ===
In the 2000 eight-hour film (broadcast as a mini-series) The 10th Kingdom, Scott Cohen plays a character called Wolf, which is based on the Big Bad Wolf and there is some speculation to whether he may even be the Big Bad Wolf's descendant (mainly owed to the fact that most other characters in the mini-series are descendants of many well-known fairy tale characters). Wolf recognizes he has a sort of obsessive-compulsive disorder towards eating lamb meat, rabbit meat, or little-girl meat, which he tries to overcome when he falls in love with Virginia, the main character. (Note that her married name would be Virginia Wolf.)

=== BB Wolf and the Three LPs ===
A 2010 hardcover graphic novel published by Top Shelf Comics by J.D. Arnold and Rich Koslowski, sets the wolf as a sympathetic victim of class warfare in the rural south. Pigs and wolves serve as allegorical races in the story, with the wolves as disenfranchised farmers and the pigs as wealthy elitists. When the blues-playing wolf suffers numerous crimes at the hands of pigs, he swears revenge and rampages through the southern underworld. The hardcover is available with a CD of its songs as sung by BB Wolf.

=== Dust City ===
Dust City, a 2010 novel by Robert Paul Weston, circles around Henry Whelp, the son of the Big Bad Wolf. In it, Henry's father was framed by a league of those who transport fairy dust. Henry must discover the truth and help to release his father.

=== Holka Polka: A Fairytail Mystery ===
Holka Polka, a children's play features the character in a different light, as someone who is afraid of little girls and cannot scare them and is not menacing at all.

=== Goldie & Bear ===
The Big Bad Wolf appears in the Disney Junior preschool series Goldie & Bear voiced by Jim Cummings (who also voiced other Disney version of the character). In the show he is called Big Bad Wolf or Big Bad (his real name is Aloysius). He is a troublemaker that likes scaring people, stealing, and being rude. However, he is also depicted as having a conscience and at times being a nice guy.

== Gallery ==
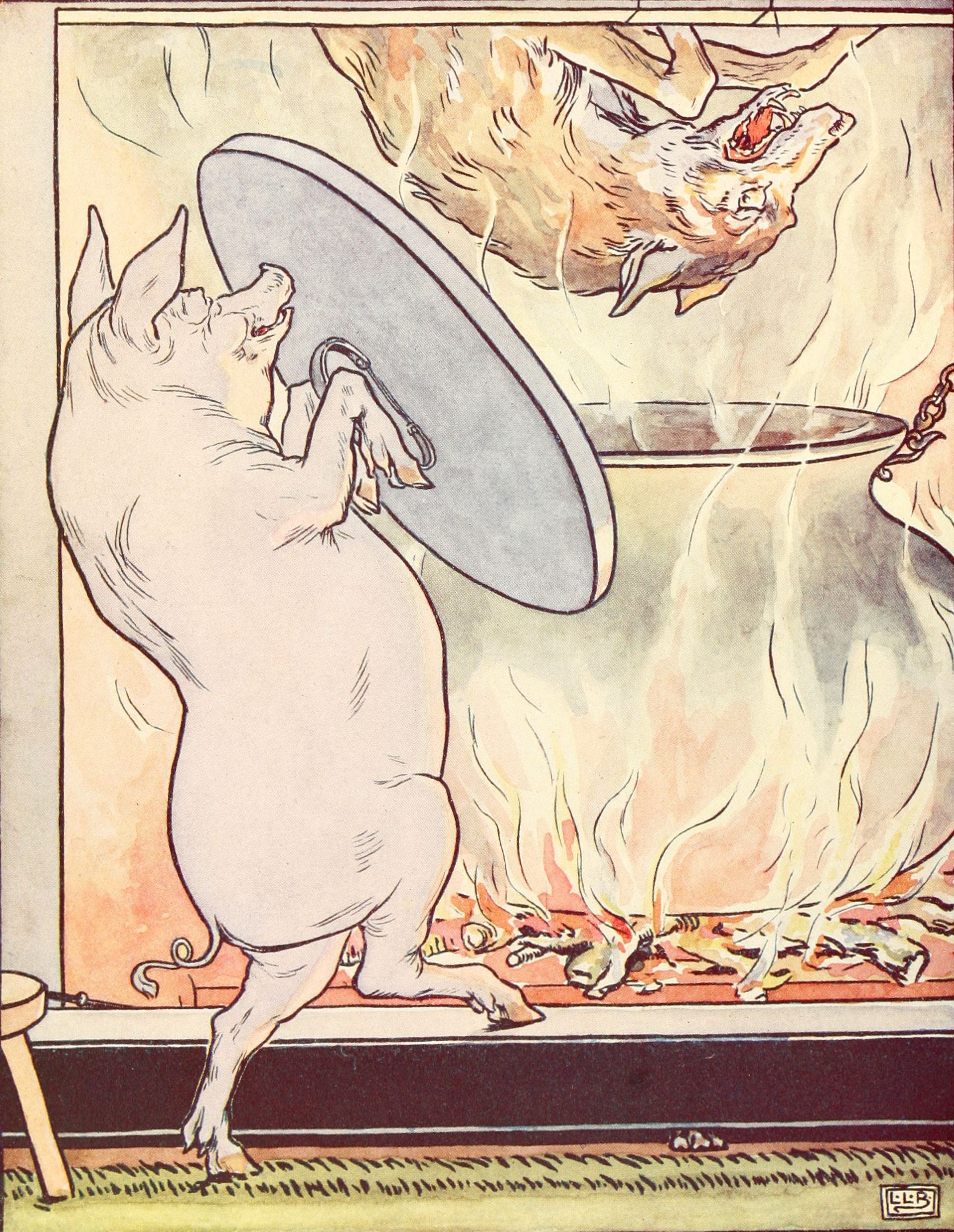
Illustration by L. Leslie Brooke, from The Golden Goose Book, Frederick Warne & Co., Ltd. 1905

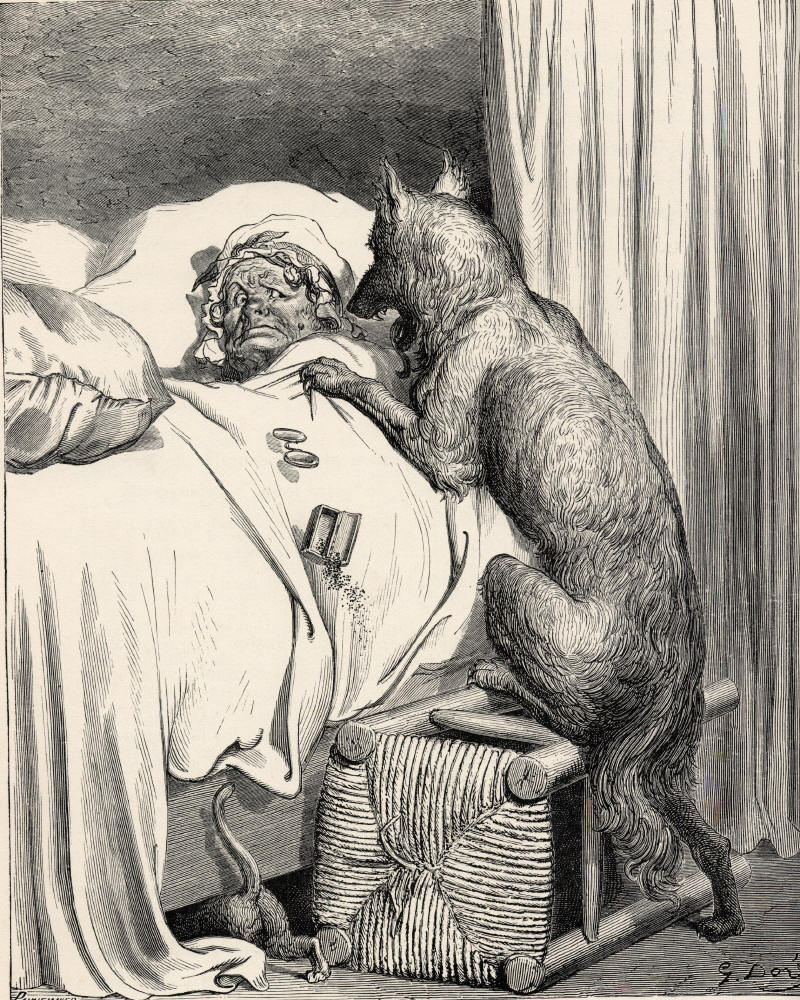
Illustration for Charles Perrault's Le Petit Chaperon Rouge from Histoires ou Contes du Temps passé: Les Contes de ma Mère l'Oye (1697). Gustave Doré's illustrations appear in an 1867 edition entitled Les Contes de Perrault. Second of three engravings

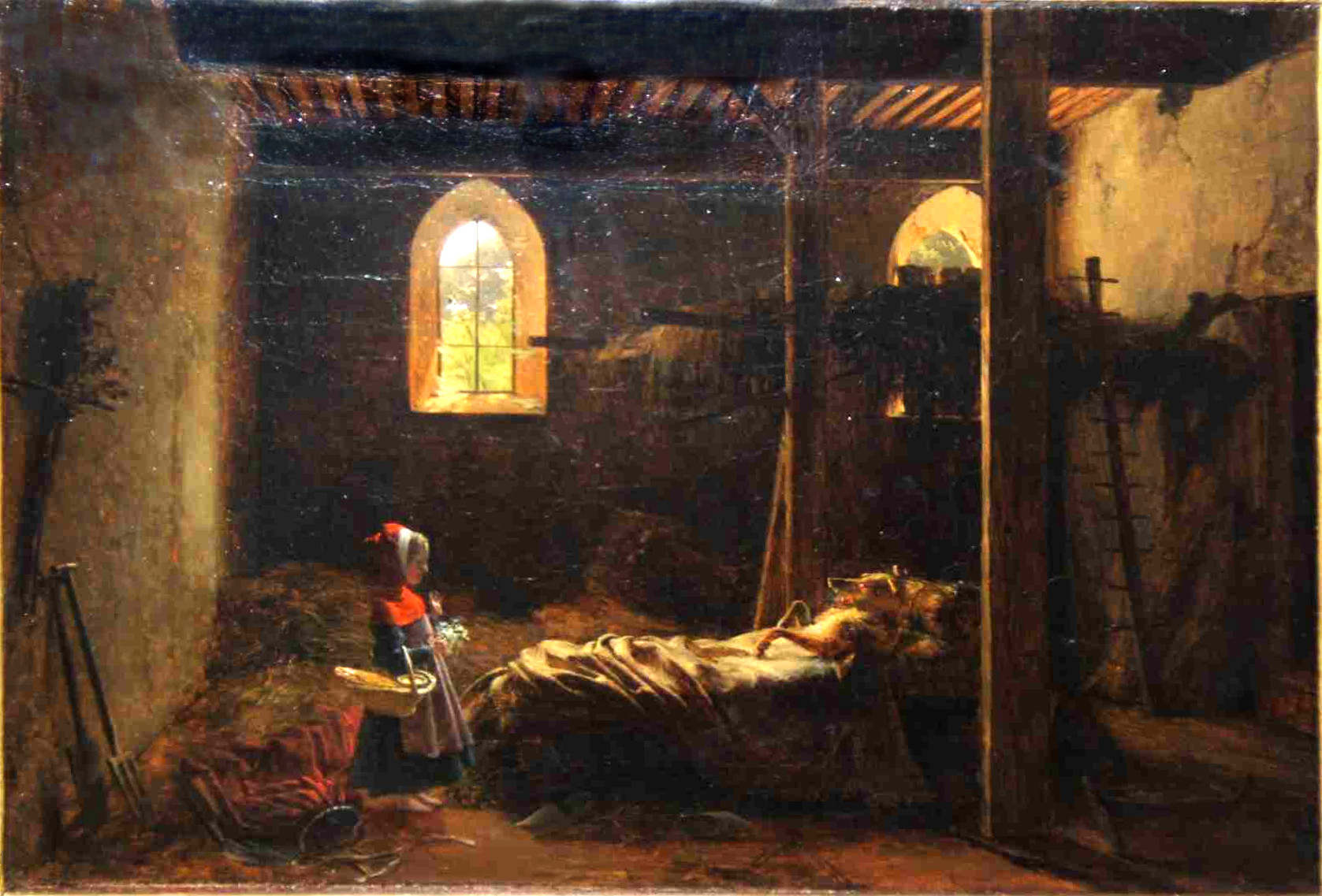
Little Red Riding Hood, 19th-century painting by Fleury-François Richard

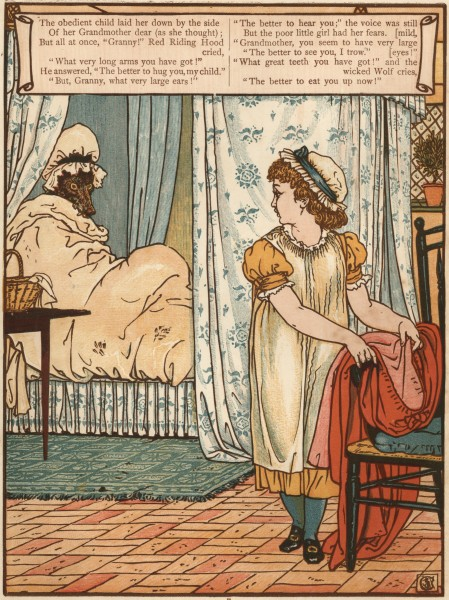
"The better to see you with": woodcut by Walter Crane

== See also ==
- List of fictional wolves
- List of wolves
