= Winnecke =

Winnecke is a surname. Notable people with the name include:

- Charles Winnecke (1857–1902), Australian explorer and botanist
- Friedrich August Theodor Winnecke (1835–1897), German astronomer
- Lloyd Winnecke (born 1960), American politician

== See also ==
- Winnecke 4, a double star in the constellation Ursa Major
- Winnecke Catalogue of Double Stars, an astronomical catalogue of double stars published by Friedrich August Theodor Winnecke
- 7P/Pons–Winnecke, a periodic Jupiter-family comet in the Solar System
- Winnecke Goldfield, a former goldfield in the Northern Territory of Australia
