= WNC =

WNC, or wnc, may refer to:

== In astronomy ==
- Winnecke Catalogue of Double Stars, catalogue of double stars published in 1869
  - Winnecke 4, also known as WNC 4, a double star in the constellation Ursa Major

== In education ==
- West Negros College, now STI West Negros University in the Philippines
- Western Nevada College, in the United States
- West Nottinghamshire College, the former name of Vision West Notts in Mansfield, United Kingdom

== In geography ==
- Western North Carolina, a region of North Carolina in the United States
  - WNC (magazine), a Western North Carolina regional bimonthly
- Washington National Cathedral, a cathedral of the Episcopal Church in the United States

== In transport ==
- WNC, the National Rail code for Windsor & Eton Central railway station in the county of Berkshire, UK

== In language ==
- wnc, the ISO 639-3 for the Wantoat language spoken in Papua New Guinea

== In organizations ==
- West Nordic Council, a cooperation forum between Greenland, the Faroe Islands and Iceland.
- West Northamptonshire Council
- Women's National Commission, a women's group based in the United Kingdom
- World News Connection
- Wrestling New Classic, Japanese professional wrestling promotion
- Wistron NeWeb Corporation, a wireless communication products manufacturing company in Taiwan
- WNC (Squat) from 1985 until 1990 in the former Wolters Noordhoff Complex in Groningen, the Netherlands.
