= Thomas Wolfe =

American novelist (1900–1938)

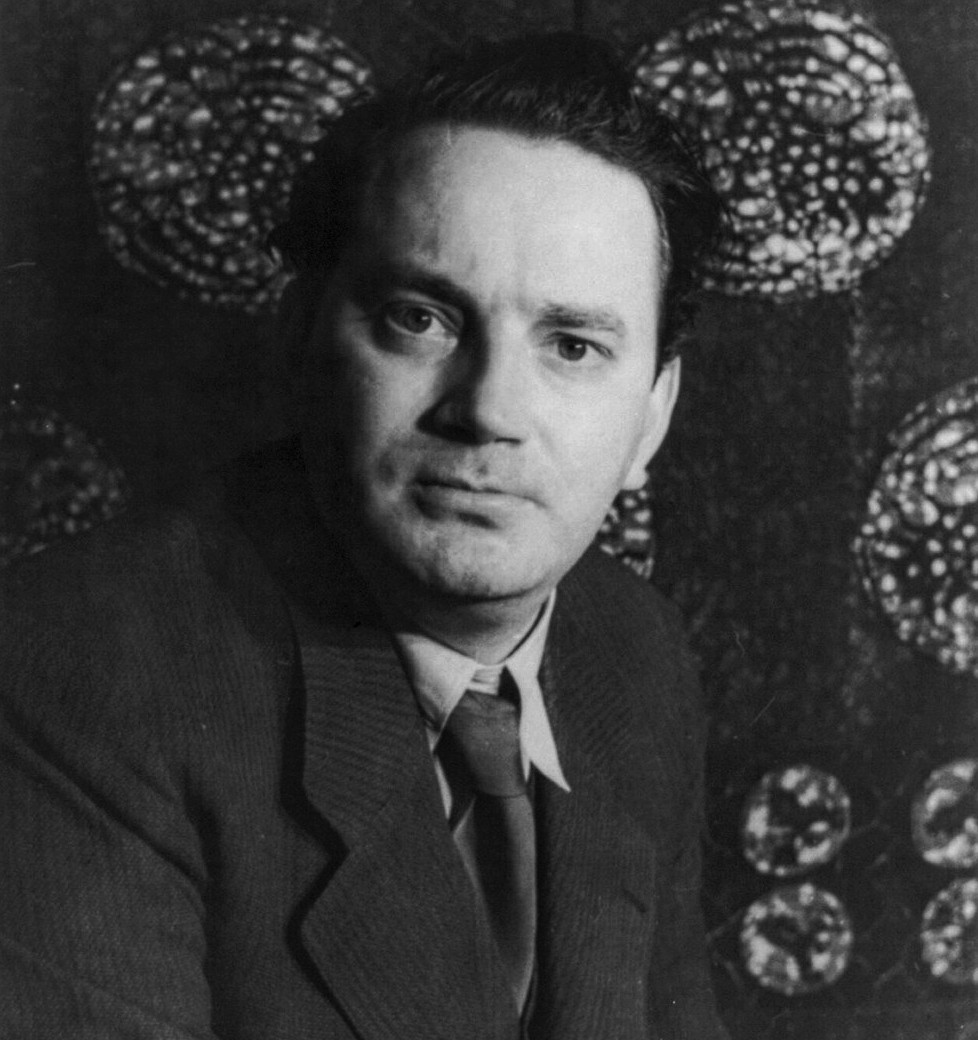
- Portrait by Carl Van Vechten, 1937
- Born: Thomas Clayton Wolfe; October 3, 1900; Asheville, North Carolina, U.S.
- Died: September 15, 1938 (aged 37); Baltimore, Maryland, U.S.
- Resting place: Riverside Cemetery, Asheville
- Education: University of North Carolina; Harvard University
- Occupation: Author
- Writing career
- Genres: Fiction; drama
- Notable works: Look Homeward, Angel (1929); Of Time and the River (1935); You Can't Go Home Again (1940, posthumous); The Web and the Rock (1939, posthumous)

Thomas Clayton Wolfe (October 3, 1900 – September 15, 1938) was an American novelist and short story writer. He is known largely for his first novel, Look Homeward, Angel (1929), and for the short fiction that appeared during the last years of his life. He was one of the pioneers of autobiographical fiction, and along with William Faulkner, he is considered one of the most important authors of the Southern Renaissance within the American literary canon. He has been dubbed "North Carolina's most famous writer."

Wolfe wrote four long novels as well as many short stories, dramatic works, and novellas. He is known for mixing highly original, poetic, rhapsodic, and impressionistic prose with autobiographical writing. His books, written and published from the 1920s to the 1940s, vividly reflect on the American culture and mores of that period, filtered through Wolfe's sensitive and uncomfortable perspective.

After Wolfe's death, Faulkner said that he might have been the greatest talent of their shared generation, and that he had aimed higher than any other writer. Faulkner's endorsement failed to win over mid- to late-20th century critics and Wolfe's place in the literary canon remained in question. However, 21st century academics have largely rejected this negative assessment, and a more positive and balanced assessment has emerged, combining renewed interest in his works, particularly his short fiction, with greater appreciation of his experimentation with literary forms, which has secured Wolfe a place in the literary canon.

Wolfe had great influence on Jack Kerouac, and his influence extended to other postwar authors, including Ray Bradbury and Philip Roth.

== Early life ==
Wolfe was born in Asheville, North Carolina, the youngest of eight children of William Oliver Wolfe (1851–1922) and Julia Elizabeth Westall (1860–1945). Six of the children lived to adulthood. His father, of Pennsylvania Dutch descent, was a successful stone carver and ran a gravestone business.

W. O. Wolfe's business used an angel statue in the window to attract customers. Thomas Wolfe "described the angel in great detail" in a short story and in Look Homeward, Angel. The angel was sold and, while there was controversy over which one was the actual angel, the location of the "Thomas Wolfe angel" was determined in 1949 to be Oakdale Cemetery in Hendersonville, North Carolina.

Wolfe's mother took in boarders and was active in acquiring real estate. In 1904, she opened a boarding house in St. Louis, Missouri, for the World's Fair. While the family was in St. Louis, Wolfe's 12-year-old brother, Grover, died of typhoid fever.

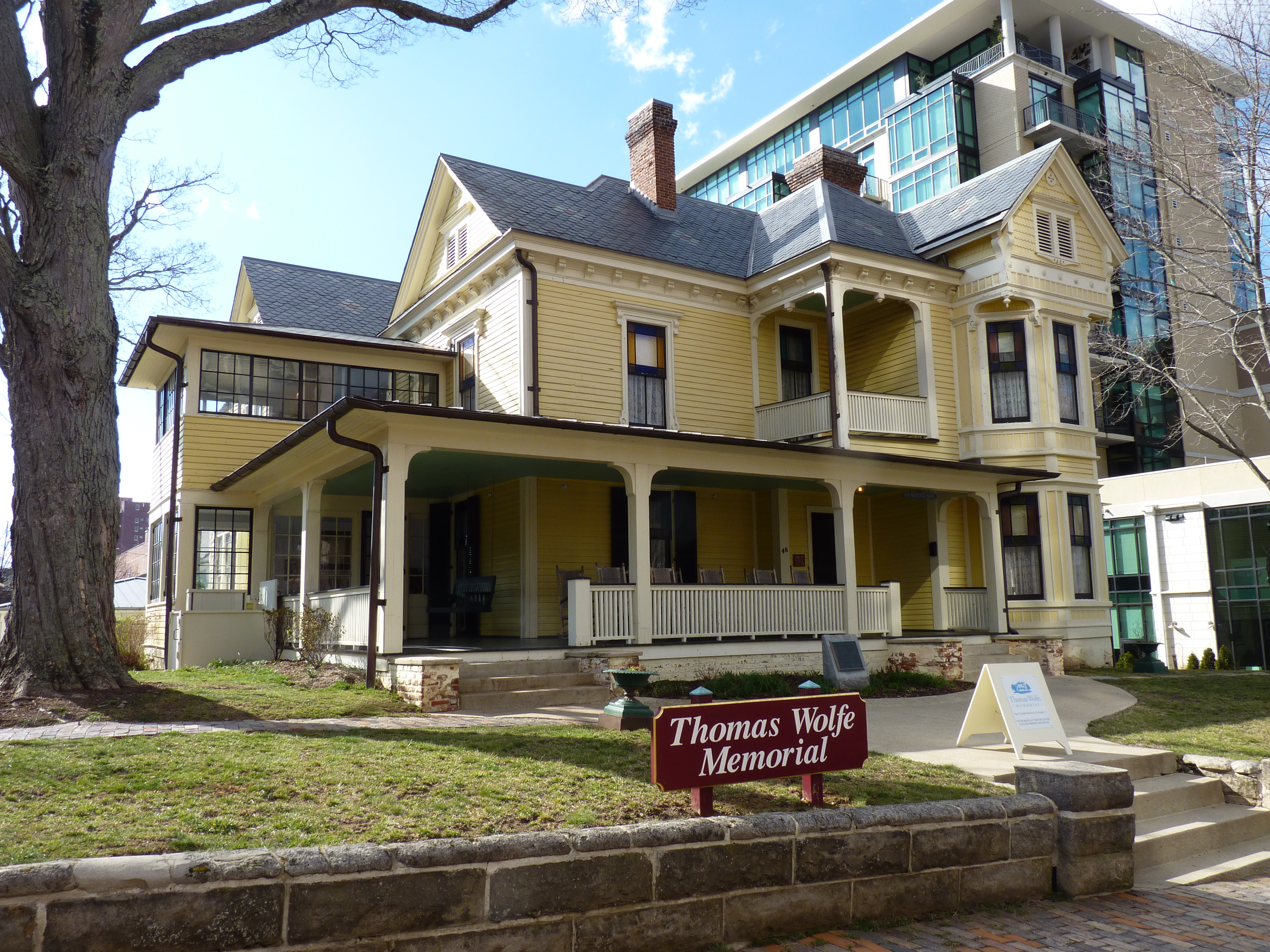
Thomas Wolfe House, 48 Spruce Street in Asheville

In 1906, Julia Wolfe bought a boarding house named "Old Kentucky Home" at nearby 48 Spruce Street in Asheville, taking up residence there with her youngest son while the rest of the family remained at the Woodfin Street residence. Wolfe lived in the boarding house on Spruce Street until he went to college in 1916. It is now the Thomas Wolfe Memorial. Wolfe was closest to his brother Ben, whose early death at age 26 is chronicled in Look Homeward, Angel. Julia Wolfe bought and sold many properties, eventually becoming a successful real estate speculator.

Wolfe began to study at the University of North Carolina at Chapel Hill (UNC) when he was 15 years old. A member of the Dialectic Society and Pi Kappa Phi fraternity, he predicted that his portrait would one day hang in New West near that of celebrated North Carolina governor Zebulon Vance, which it does today. Aspiring to be a playwright, in 1919 Wolfe enrolled in a playwriting course. His one-act play, The Return of Buck Gavin, was performed by the newly formed Carolina Playmakers, then composed of classmates in Frederick Koch's playwriting class, with Wolfe acting the title role. He edited UNC's student newspaper The Daily Tar Heel and won the Worth Prize for Philosophy for an essay titled "The Crisis in Industry". Another of his plays, The Third Night, was performed by the Playmakers in December 1919. Wolfe was inducted into the Golden Fleece honor society.

Wolfe graduated from UNC with a Bachelor of Arts degree in June 1920, and in September, entered Harvard University, where he studied playwriting under George Pierce Baker. Two versions of his play The Mountains were performed by Baker's 47 Workshop in 1921. While taking Baker's 47 Workshop course he befriended the playwright Kenneth Raisbeck who was Baker's graduate assistant. Wolfe later based the character of Francis Starwick in his semi-autobiographical novel Of Time and the River (1935) on Raisbeck.

In 1922, Wolfe received his master's degree from Harvard. His father died in Asheville in June of that year. Wolfe studied another year with Baker, and the 47 Workshop produced his 10-scene play Welcome to Our City in May 1923.

Wolfe visited New York City again in November 1923 and solicited funds for UNC, while trying to sell his plays to Broadway. In February 1924, he began teaching English as an instructor at New York University (NYU), a position he occupied periodically for almost seven years.

== Career ==
Wolfe was unable to sell any of his plays after three years because of their great length. The Theatre Guild came close to producing Welcome to Our City before ultimately rejecting it, and Wolfe found his writing style more suited to fiction than the stage. He sailed to Europe in October 1924 to continue writing. From England he traveled to France, Italy and Switzerland.

On his return voyage in 1925, he met Aline Bernstein (1880–1955), a scene designer for the Theatre Guild. Twenty years his senior, she was married to a successful stockbroker with whom she had two children. In October 1925, she and Wolfe became lovers and remained so for five years. Their affair was turbulent and sometimes combative, but she exerted a powerful influence, encouraging and funding his writing.

Wolfe returned to Europe in the summer of 1926 and began writing the first version of an autobiographical novel titled O Lost. The narrative, which evolved into Look Homeward, Angel, fictionalized his early experiences in Asheville, and chronicled family, friends, and the boarders at his mother's establishment on Spruce Street. In the book, he renamed the town Altamont and called the boarding house "Dixieland". His family's surname became Gant, and Wolfe called himself Eugene, his father Oliver, and his mother Eliza. The original manuscript of O Lost was over 1,100 pages (333,000 words) long, and considerably more experimental in style than the final version of Look Homeward, Angel. It was submitted to Scribner's, where the editing was done by Maxwell Perkins, the most prominent book editor of the time, who also worked with F. Scott Fitzgerald and Ernest Hemingway. He cut the book to focus more on the character of Eugene, a stand-in for Wolfe. Wolfe initially expressed gratitude to Perkins for his disciplined editing, but he had misgivings later. It has been said that Wolfe found a father figure in Perkins, and that Perkins, who had five daughters, found a sort of foster son in Wolfe.

The novel, which had been dedicated to Bernstein, was published 11 days before the stock market crash of 1929. Soon afterward, Wolfe returned to Europe and ended his affair with Bernstein. The novel caused a stir in Asheville, with its over 200 thinly disguised local characters. Wolfe chose to stay away from Asheville for eight years because of the uproar; he traveled to Europe for a year on a Guggenheim Fellowship. Look Homeward, Angel was a bestseller in the United Kingdom and Germany. Some members of Wolfe's family were upset with their portrayal in the book, but his sister Mabel wrote to him that she was sure he had the best of intentions.

After four more years writing in Brooklyn, the second novel Wolfe submitted to Scribner's was The October Fair, a multi-volume epic roughly the length of Marcel Proust's In Search of Lost Time. After considering the commercial possibilities of publishing the book in full, Perkins opted to cut it significantly and create a single volume. Titled Of Time and the River, it was more commercially successful than Look Homeward, Angel. In an ironic twist, the citizens of Asheville were more upset this time because they had not been included. The character of Esther Jack was based on Bernstein. In 1934, Maxim Lieber served as his literary agent.

Wolfe was persuaded by Edward Aswell to leave Scribner's and sign with Harper & Brothers. By some accounts, Perkins' severe editing of Wolfe's work is what prompted him to leave. Others describe his growing resentment that some people attributed his success to Perkins' work as editor. In 1936, Bernard DeVoto, reviewing The Story of a Novel for Saturday Review, wrote that Look Homeward, Angel was "hacked and shaped and compressed into something resembling a novel by Mr. Perkins and the assembly-line at Scribners".

Wolfe spent much time in Europe and was especially popular and at ease in Germany, where he made many friends. However, in 1936 he witnessed incidents of discrimination against Jews, which upset him and changed his mind about the political developments in the country. He returned to America and published a story based on his observations ("I Have a Thing to Tell You") in The New Republic. Following its publication, Wolfe's books were banned by the German government, and he was prohibited from traveling there.

In 1937, "Chickamauga", his short story set during the American Civil War battle of the same name, was published. Wolfe returned to Asheville in early 1937 for the first time since publication of his first book.

== Death ==
In 1938, after submitting over one million words of manuscript to his new editor, Edward Aswell, Wolfe left New York for a tour of the Western United States. On the way, he stopped at Purdue University and gave a lecture, "Writing and Living", and then spent two weeks traveling through 11 national parks in the West, the only part of the country he had never visited. Wolfe wrote to Aswell that while he had focused on his family in his previous writing, he would now take a more global perspective. In July, he became ill with pneumonia while visiting Seattle, spending three weeks in the hospital there. His sister Mabel closed her boarding house in Washington, D.C. and went to Seattle to care for him. Complications arose, and Wolfe was eventually diagnosed with miliary tuberculosis.

On September 6, he was sent to Baltimore's Johns Hopkins Hospital for treatment by Walter Dandy, the most famous neurosurgeon in the country, but an operation revealed that the disease had overrun the entire right side of his brain. Without regaining consciousness, he died 18 days before his 38th birthday.

On his deathbed and shortly before lapsing into a coma, Wolfe wrote a letter to Perkins. He acknowledged that Perkins had helped to realize his work and had made his labors possible. In closing he wrote:

I shall always think of you and feel about you the way it was that Fourth of July day three years ago when you met me at the boat, and we went out on the cafe on the river and had a drink and later went on top of the tall building, and all the strangeness and the glory and the power of life and of the city was below.

Wolfe was buried in Riverside Cemetery in Asheville, North Carolina, beside his parents and siblings.

After Wolfe's death, The New York Times wrote:

His was one of the most confident young voices in contemporary American literature, a vibrant, full-toned voice which it is hard to believe could be so suddenly stilled. The stamp of genius was upon him, though it was an undisciplined and unpredictable genius ... There was within him an unspent energy, an untiring force, an unappeasable hunger for life and for expression which might have carried him to the heights and might equally have torn him down.

Time wrote: "The death last week of Thomas Clayton Wolfe shocked critics with the realization that, of all American novelists of his generation, he was the one from whom most had been expected."

== Posthumous works ==
Wolfe saw less than half of his work published in his lifetime. Two novels, The Web and the Rock and You Can't Go Home Again, were edited posthumously by Edward Aswell of Harper & Brothers. The novels were "two of the longest one-volume novels ever written" (nearly 700 pages each). In these novels, Wolfe changed the name of his autobiographical character from Eugene Gant to George Webber.

O Lost, the original "author's cut" of Look Homeward, Angel, was reconstructed by F. Scott Fitzgerald scholar Matthew Bruccoli and published in 2000 on the centennial of Wolfe's birth. Bruccoli said that while Perkins was a talented editor, Look Homeward, Angel is inferior to the complete work of O Lost and that the publication of the complete novel "marks nothing less than the restoration of a masterpiece to the literary canon".

== Critical reception ==
Upon publication of Look Homeward, Angel, most reviewers responded favorably, including John Chamberlain, Carl Van Doren, and Stringfellow Barr. Margaret Wallace wrote in The New York Times Book Review that Wolfe had produced "as interesting and powerful a book as has ever been made out of the drab circumstances of provincial American life". An anonymous review published in Scribner's magazine compared Wolfe to Walt Whitman, and many other reviewers and scholars have found similarities in their works since.

When published in the UK in July 1930, the book received similar reviews. Richard Aldington wrote that the novel was "the product of an immense exuberance, organic in its form, kinetic, and drenched with the love of life...I rejoice over Mr. Wolfe". Both in his 1930 Nobel Prize for Literature acceptance speech and original press conference announcement, Sinclair Lewis, the first American to win the Nobel Prize for literature, said of Wolfe, "He may have a chance to be the greatest American writer...In fact I don't see why he should not be one of the greatest world writers."

Upon publication of his second novel, Of Time and the River, most reviewers and the public remained supportive, though some critics found shortcomings while still hailing it for moments or aspects of greatness. The book was well received by the public and became his only American bestseller. The publication was viewed as "the literary event of 1935"; by comparison, the earlier attention given to Look Homeward, Angel was modest. Both The New York Times and New York Herald Tribune published enthusiastic front-page reviews. Clifton Fadiman wrote in The New Yorker that while he was not sure what he thought of the book, "for decades we have not had eloquence like his in American writing". Malcolm Cowley of The New Republic thought the book would be twice as good if half as long, but stated Wolfe was "the only contemporary writer who can be mentioned in the same breath as Dickens and Dostoevsky". Robert Penn Warren thought Wolfe produced some brilliant fragments from which "several fine novels might be written". He went on to say: "And meanwhile it may be well to recollect that Shakespeare merely wrote Hamlet; he was not Hamlet." Warren also praised Wolfe in the same review, though, as did John Donald Wade in a separate review.

Though he was acclaimed during his lifetime as one of the most important American writers, comparable to F. Scott Fitzgerald, Ernest Hemingway, or William Faulkner, Wolfe's reputation as a writer was heavily criticized after his death. He was ridiculed by such prominent critics as Harold Bloom and James Wood. At one time he was left out of college courses and anthologies devoted to great writers. Faulkner and W.J. Cash listed Wolfe as the ablest writer of their generation, although Faulkner later qualified his praise. Despite his early admiration of Wolfe's work, Faulkner later decided that his novels were "like an elephant trying to do the hoochie-coochie". Ernest Hemingway's verdict was that Wolfe was "the over-bloated Li'l Abner of literature".

Twenty-first century scholars have largely rejected the overly negative criticism of Wolfe from the mid to late 20th century. This re-assessment of Wolfe began in the 1980s with writers like Leslie Fields whose entry on Wolfe in the Dictionary of Literary Biography (1981) was one of the earlier publications to provide a more thorough and positive assessment of Wolfe's short stories. From this point on, positive re-assessment began to grow and current assessment of Wolfe tends to be more balanced, with a greater appreciation of his experimentation with literary forms. The Complete Short Stories of Thomas Wolfe was published in 1987, and his short stories were later published in several anthologies, including American Classics (1989, Marshall Cavendish), The American Short Story: A Treasury of the Memorable and Familiar, by the Great American Writers from Washington Irving to Saul Bellow (1994, State Street Press), Short Stories from the Old North State (2012, University of North Carolina Press), and Writing Appalachia: An Anthology (2020, University Press of Kentucky) among others. Wolfe is now read more widely in high school and college literature courses then previously. Today, William Faulkner and Wolfe are considered the two most important authors of the Southern Renaissance within the American literary canon.

== Legacy ==
Southerner and Harvard historian David Herbert Donald's biography of Wolfe, Look Homeward, won the Pulitzer Prize for Biography in 1988.

Wolfe inspired the works of many other authors, including Betty Smith with A Tree Grows in Brooklyn, Robert Morgan, author of Gap Creek, and Prince of Tides author Pat Conroy, who has said "My writing career began the instant I finished Look Homeward, Angel." Jack Kerouac idolized Wolfe. Ray Bradbury was influenced by Wolfe, and included him as a character in his books. Earl Hamner, Jr., who created the popular television series The Waltons, idolized Wolfe in his youth.

Hunter S. Thompson credits Wolfe for his famous phrase "Fear and Loathing" (on page 62 of The Web and the Rock).

== Archives ==
Two universities hold the primary archival collections of Thomas Wolfe materials in the United States: the Thomas Clayton Wolfe Papers at Harvard University's Houghton Library, which includes all of Wolfe's manuscripts, and the Thomas Wolfe Collections in the North Carolina Collection at the University of North Carolina at Chapel Hill. Each October, at the time of Wolfe's birthday, UNC-Chapel Hill presents the annual Thomas Wolfe Prize and Lecture to a contemporary writer, with past recipients including Roy Blount, Jr., Robert Morgan, Pat Conroy, and, as the first recipient, Tom Wolfe.

== Tributes ==
Return of an Angel, a play by Sandra Mason, explores the reactions of Wolfe's family and the citizens of his hometown of Asheville to the publication of Look Homeward, Angel. The play was staged several times near the Thomas Wolfe Memorial, in the month of October, to commemorate his birthday. Pack Memorial Library in Asheville hosts the Thomas Wolfe Collection which "honors Asheville's favorite son". The Western North Carolina Historical Association has presented the Thomas Wolfe Memorial Literary Award yearly since 1955 for a literary achievement of the previous year. The Thomas Wolfe Society celebrates Wolfe's writings and publishes an annual review about Wolfe's work. The United States Postal Service honored Wolfe with a postage stamp on the occasion of what would have been Wolfe's 100th birthday in 2000.

== Historic landmarks ==
The "Old Kentucky Home" was donated by Wolfe's family as the Thomas Wolfe Memorial and has been open to visitors since the 1950s, owned by the state of North Carolina since 1976 and designated as a National Historic Landmark. Wolfe called it "Dixieland" in Look Homeward, Angel. In 1998, 200 of the house's 800 original artifacts and the house's dining room were destroyed by a fire set by an arsonist during the Bele Chere street festival. The perpetrator remains unknown. After a $2.4 million restoration, the house was re-opened in 2003.

A cabin built by Wolfe's friend Max Whitson in 1924 near Azalea Road was designated as a historic landmark by the Asheville City Council in 1982. Thomas Wolfe Cabin, as it is called, was where Wolfe spent the summer of 1937 in his last visit to the city. In a letter to F. Scott Fitzgerald, Wolfe wrote "I am going into the woods. I am going to try to do the best, the most important piece of work I have ever done", referring to October Fair, which became The Web and the Rock and You Can't Go Home Again. He also wrote "The Party at Jack's" while at the cabin in the Oteen community. The city bought the property, including a larger house, from John Moyer in 2001, and did some work fixing up the cabin. Restoring the cabin would cost $300,000 but as of 2021 there is no funding. Plans for the site would cost at least $3.5 million, and as much as $6.7 million.

== The Thomas Wolfe Society ==
The Thomas Wolfe Society, established in the late 1970s, issues an annual publication of Wolfe-related materials, and its journal, The Thomas Wolfe Review features scholarly articles, belles lettres, and reviews. The Society also awards prizes for literary scholarship on Wolfe.

== Adaptations ==
In 1958, Ketti Frings adapted Look Homeward, Angel into a play of the same name. It ran on Broadway for 564 performances at the Ethel Barrymore Theatre, received six Tony Award nominations, and won the 1958 Pulitzer Prize for Drama. Frings was named "Woman of the Year" by The Los Angeles Times in the same year. In 1972, it was presented as a television drama, as was Of Time and the River in a one-hour version. In 1978 a CBS television movie of "You Can't Go Home Again" starred Lee Grant and Chris Sarandon.

Wolfe's play Welcome to Our City was performed twice at Harvard during his graduate school years, in Zurich in Switzerland during the 1950s, and by the Mint Theater in New York City in 2000 in celebration of Wolfe's 100th birthday.[51]

The title character of Herman Wouk's 1962 bestselling novel Youngblood Hawke, and its subsequent film adaptation, was loosely based on Wolfe.

Wolfe's relationship with his editor Maxwell Perkins was the basis of a movie titled Genius in 2016 in which Jude Law and Colin Firth played the roles of Wolfe and Perkins respectively. Nicole Kidman played Aline Bernstein.

== Works ==
=== Novels ===
- Look Homeward, Angel (1929)
- Of Time and the River (1935)

Posthumous works:

- The Web and the Rock (1939; published posthumously)
- You Can't Go Home Again (1940; published posthumously)
- The Hills Beyond (1941; published posthumously)
- The Hound of Darkness (1986; published posthumously)
- The Good Child's River (1991; published posthumously)
- The Starwick Episodes (1994; deleted sections from Of Time and the River; published posthumously)
- O Lost: A Story of the Buried Life (2000)

=== Short fiction collections ===
- From Death to Morning (1935)
- Short Stories (1947) aka Only the Dead Know Brooklyn (1952)
- Short Novels of Thomas Wolfe (1961; published posthumously; collects A Portrait of Bascom Hawke, The Web of Earth, No Door, "I Have a Thing to Tell You", and The Party at Jack's)
- The Complete Short Stories of Thomas Wolfe (1987)

=== Plays ===
- Mannerhouse: A Play in a Prologue and Four Acts (1948; published posthumously)
- The Mountains: A Play in One Act; The Mountains: A Drama in Three Acts and a Prologue (1970; published posthumously)
- Welcome to Our City: A Play in Ten Scenes (Performed in 1923; published posthumously in 1983)

=== Nonfiction ===
- The Story of a Novel (1936)
- A Western Journal: A Daily Log of the Great Parks Trip, June 20–July 2, 1938 (1951; published posthumously)
- The Letters of Thomas Wolfe (1956; published posthumously)
- Beyond Love and Loyalty: The Letters of Thomas Wolfe and Elizabeth Nowell (1983; published posthumously)
- My Other Loneliness: Letters of Thomas Wolfe and Aline Bernstein (1983; Richard Kennedy, ed.)
- To Loot My Life Clean: The Thomas Wolfe–Maxwell Perkins Correspondence (2000; Matthew J. Bruccoli & Park Bucker, ed.)
- "God's Lonely Man" (undated essay)

=== Poetry ===
- A Stone, a Leaf, a Door (1945; a collection of Wolfe's prose which was selected and respaced as a series of poems)

Look Homeward, Angel and Of Time and the River were published in Armed Services Editions during World War II.

=== Short fiction ===
Title	Publication	Collected in
"An Angel on the Porch"	Scribner's (August 1929)	from Look Homeward, Angel
"A Portrait of Bascom Hawke"	Scribner's (April 1932)	from Of Time and the River
"The Web of Earth"	Scribner's (July 1932)	From Death to Morning
"The Train and the City"	Scribner's (May 1933)	from Of Time and the River
"Death the Proud Brother"	Scribner's (June 1933)	From Death to Morning
"No Door"	Scribner's (July 1933)	From Death to Morning
"The Four Lost Men"	Scribner's (February 1934)	From Death to Morning
"Boom Town"	The American Mercury (May 1934)	from You Can't Go Home Again
"The Sun and the Rain"	Scribner's (May 1934)	from Of Time and the River
"The House of the Far and Lost"	Scribner's (August 1934)	from Of Time and the River
"Dark in the Forest, Strange as Time"	Scribner's (November 1934)	From Death to Morning
"The Names of the Nation"	Modern Monthly (December 1934)	from Of Time and the River
"For Professional Appearance"	Modern Monthly (January 1935)	from Of Time and the River
"One of the Girls in Our Party"	Scribner's (January 1935)	From Death to Morning
"Circus at Dawn"	Modern Monthly (March 1935)	From Death to Morning
"His Father's Earth"	Modern Monthly (April 1935)	from The Web and the Rock
"Old Catawba"	Virginia Quarterly Review 11.2 (April 1935)	From Death to Morning
"Arnold Pentland" aka "A Kinsman of His Blood"	Esquire (June 1935)	The Hills Beyond
"In the Park"	Harper's Bazaar (June 1935)	From Death to Morning
"The Face of the War"	Modern Monthly (June 1935)	From Death to Morning
"Polyphemus"	North American Review 240.1 (June 1935)	From Death to Morning
"Gulliver, the Story of a Tall Man"	Scribner's (June 1935)	From Death to Morning
"Only the Dead Know Brooklyn"	The New Yorker (June 15, 1935)	From Death to Morning
"The Far and Near" aka "Cottage by the Tracks"	Cosmopolitan (July 1935)	From Death to Morning
"The Bums at Sunset"	Vanity Fair (October 1935)	From Death to Morning
"The Bell Remembered"	The American Mercury (August 1936)	The Hills Beyond
"Fame and the Poet"	The American Mercury (October 1936)	The Complete Short Stories
"I Have a Thing to Tell You"	The New Republic (March 10, 1937)	from You Can't Go Home Again
"Mr. Malone"	The New Yorker (May 29, 1937)	from The Web and the Rock
"Oktoberfest"	Scribner's (June 1937)	from The Web and the Rock
"'E, a Recollection"	The New Yorker (July 17, 1937)	from You Can't Go Home Again
"April, Late April"	The American Mercury (September 1937)	from The Web and the Rock
"The Child by Tiger"	The Saturday Evening Post (September 11, 1937)	from The Web and the Rock
"Katamoto"	Harper's Bazaar (October 1937)	from You Can't Go Home Again
"The Lost Boy"	Redbook (November 1937)	The Hills Beyond
"Chickamauga"	The Yale Review (Winter 1938)	The Hills Beyond
"The Company"	The New Masses (January 11, 1938)	from You Can't Go Home Again
"A Prologue to America"	Vogue (February 1, 1938)	from The Web and the Rock
"Portrait of a Literary Critic"	The American Mercury (April 1939)	The Hills Beyond
"The Party at Jack's"	Scribner's (May 1939)	from You Can't Go Home Again
"The Winter of Our Discontent"	The Atlantic (June 1939)	from The Web and the Rock
"The Birthday"	Harper's (June 1939)	from The Web and the Rock
"The Golden City"	Harper's Bazaar (June 1939)	from The Web and the Rock
"Three O'Clock"	North American Review 247.2 (Summer 1939)	from The Web and the Rock
"The Hollyhock Sowers"	The American Mercury (August 1940)	from You Can't Go Home Again
"The Dark Messiah"	Current History & Forum (August 1940)	from You Can't Go Home Again
"Nebraska Crane"	Harper's (August 1940)	from You Can't Go Home Again
"So This Is Man"	Town & Country (August 1940)	from You Can't Go Home Again
"The Promise of America"	Coronet (September 1940)	from You Can't Go Home Again
"The Hollow Men"	Esquire (October 1940)	from You Can't Go Home Again
"The Anatomy of Loneliness"	The American Mercury (October 1941)	The Hills Beyond
"The Lion at Morning"	Harper's Bazaar (October 1941)	The Hills Beyond
"The Plumed Knight"	Town & Country (October 1941)	The Hills Beyond
"The Newspaper" aka "Gentlemen of the Press"	The Hills Beyond (1941)	The Hills Beyond
"No Cure For It"	The Hills Beyond (1941)	The Hills Beyond
"On Leprechauns"	The Hills Beyond (1941)	The Hills Beyond
"The Return of the Prodigal"	The Hills Beyond (1941)	The Hills Beyond
"Old Man Rivers"	The Atlantic (December 1947)	The Complete Short Stories
"Justice Is Blind"	The Enigma of Thomas Wolfe (1953)	The Complete Short Stories
"No More Rivers"	Beyond Love and Loyalty (1983)	The Complete Short Stories
"The Spanish Letter"	The Complete Short Stories (1987)	The Complete Short Stories

== Bilingual works ==
- Those who know Brooklyn / Wer Brooklyn kennt. Calambac Publishing House, Germany 2024, bilingual edition: English/German, ISBN 978-3-943117-30-1.

== See also ==
- North Carolina literature
- University of North Carolina at Chapel Hill
- Dialectic and Philanthropic Societies
