= From Death to Morning =

Short story collection published by Thomas Wolfe published in 1935

Dust jacket of first edition

From Death to Morning is a collection of short stories by the 20th century American writer Thomas Wolfe. It was published by Scribner's in 1935 (the same year they also published Wolfe's novel Of Time and the River).

The book includes 14 stories: "No Door," "Death the Proud Brother," "The Face of the War," "Only the Dead Know Brooklyn," "Dark in the Forest, Strange as Time", "The Four Lost Men," "Gulliver", "The Bums at Sunset", "One of the Girls in our Party", "The Far and the Near", "In the Park", "The Men of Old Catawba", "Circus of Dawn", and "The Web of Earth". Some are but five or six pages long.

== Reception ==
Kirkus Reviews described the stories as not so much stories as impressions, lacking plots and scenarios, being more in the nature of "jottings and footnotes to journalistic episodes". Kirkus nevertheless praised the book highly, as a skillful and brilliant blended pattern, less uneven than his longer works. Bookseller Blind Horse Books characterized the collection as a whole as revolving around the passage of time, the inevitability of death, and the human experience of memory and loss, and how people struggle in approaching these aspects of existence.
