= The Good Child's River =

Novel by Thomas Wolfe

- Author: Thomas Wolfe
- Language: English
- Genre: Fiction
- Publication date: 1991
- Publication place: United States
- Media type: Print (hardcover)

The Good Child's River is a novel by Thomas Wolfe. A formerly lost novel, it was first published in 1991, 53 years after Wolfe's death.

The book was found, edited, and produced by Suzanne Stutman, a Wolfe scholar who also edited the 1983 book My Other Loneliness: Letters of Thomas Wolfe and Aline Bernstein. It has been described as a novel, but also as a "novel-length fragment", a "hastily... lashed together... welter of vignettes" making for "an unfinished novel", and "not so much a novel as it is a rich collection of reminiscences and tableaux"

Wolfe wrote it around 1930, as part of a huge epic series to be called "The October Fair". The Good Child's River was meant to be a part of Wolfe's 1935 novel Of Time and the River, but most of it was never typed from the three handwritten ledgers which Stutman found in the William B. Wisdom Thomas Wolfe Collection of Harvard's Houghton Library manuscript collection. What had been typed had been included in the posthumously edited and published 1939 novel, The Web and the Rock as well as in From Death to Morning and Of Time and the River.

Unlike Wolfe's major novels, The Good Child's River doesn't include either Eugene Gant or George Webber, Wolfe's fictional counterparts, but instead focuses on Webber's lover, Esther Jack (based on Aline Bernstein). Bernstein made many notes about her life for Wolfe, who fashioned the material into The Good Child's River (Bernstein also used some of the same material in her autobiography, An Actor's Daughter).

== Reviews ==
Frank Levering described the novel as "an exotic, unique experience for the reader... Esther Jack is a compelling character – a girl and young woman with an open mind and a clear-eyed passion for life as it comes. Through her eyes, aunts, cousins, schoolmates, her mother and friends of the family come alive vividly – a parade of flawed humanity on the streets of old New York." Publishers Weekly wrote that Wolfe's "storytelling genius, vital and chaotic, emerges" in the book and that "Reading these lyrical, effusive pages is to take an invigorating plunge in the swarming sea of Wolfe's imagination". Donald Newlove wrote that "The Good Child's River is not minor Wolfe. Readers who come fresh to it, never before having read Wolfe, may well be stunned by his power, and may start questioning the skinny little sentences and squeaks of feeling in today's writers. The rest of us will be replenished and exhilarated. Nobody writes for full orchestra any more." Kirkus Reviews said that "The novel is a meditation, in Wolfe's boldest style, on time as a dark, rich river" and that although "there are clinkers about the Jews, things Esther would never say or think, and some of his women are sticks... all is forgiven in the sheer magic of Wolfe unbound", the whole resulting in "An often stunningly disciplined first draft – by a genius."
