= Aline Bernstein =

American set and costume designer (1880–1955)

- Born: December 22, 1880; New York City
- Died: September 7, 1955 (aged 74); New York City
- Occupation: Costume designer
- Known for: Founder of Museum of Costume Art, muse of Thomas Wolfe
- Spouse: Theodore F. Bernstein (m. 1902)
- Children: 2
- Parent(s): Joseph Frankau, Rebecca Frankau

Aline Bernstein (December 22, 1880 – September 7, 1955) was an American set designer and costume designer. She and Irene Lewisohn founded the Museum of Costume Art. Bernstein was the lover, patron, and muse of novelist Thomas Wolfe.

== Early life ==
She was born in 1880 in New York City, the daughter of Rebecca (Goldsmith) and Joseph Frankau, an actor. Joseph was a cousin of London cigar importer Arthur Frankau and thus, by marriage, of novelist and art historian Frank Danby, whom Aline recalled visiting as a child when Joseph Frankau was performing in London. Her family was Jewish. By the time she was 17, both of her parents had died and she was raised by her aunt, Rachel Goldsmith. Goldsmith had a theatrical boarding house on West 44th Street in New York City.

== Career ==
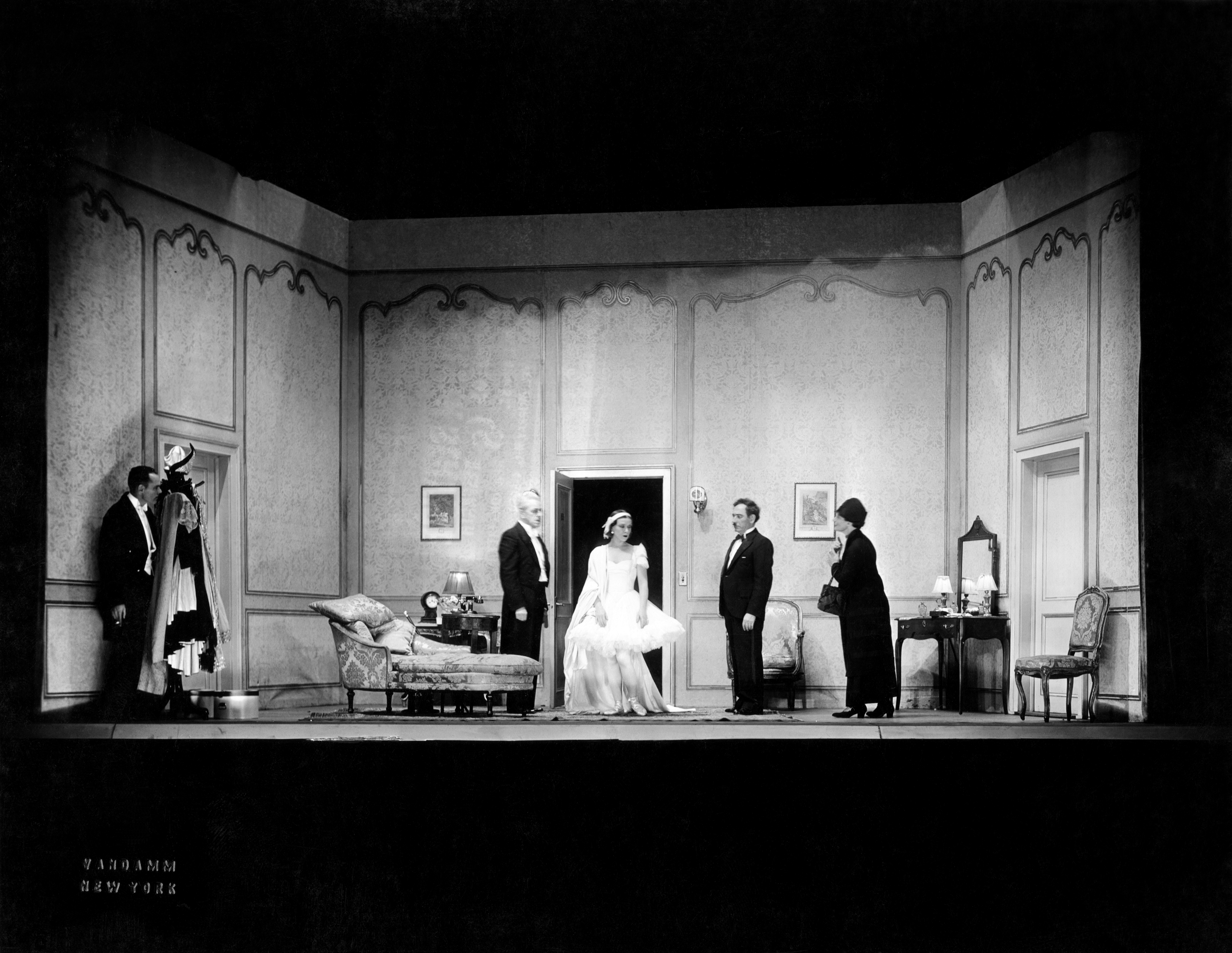
One of Bernstein's set designs for the original Broadway production of Grand Hotel (1930)

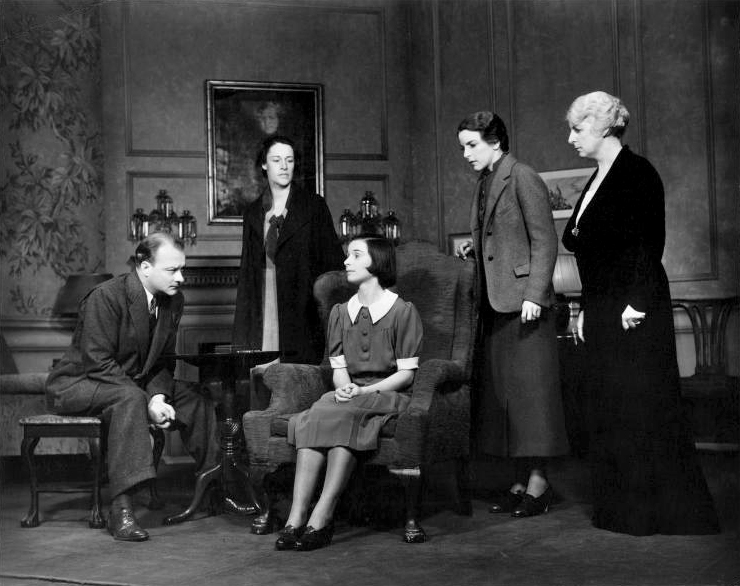
Bernstein's setting for the original Broadway production of The Children's Hour (1934)

Between 1916 and 1951, Bernstein would do set design, costuming, or both for 51 productions.

Bernstein was a theater set and costume designer for the Neighborhood Playhouse on the Lower East Side, volunteering her work to make her name.

In 1926 she struggled but prevailed in becoming the first female member of the designers union. This membership opened up opportunities for Broadway commissions. However, as a woman, she still found that it was much easier to find work as a costume designer than as a set designer. Her career ran in phases; early on, she focused largely on costume design. After about 14 years of work, in 1930, she was able to move into set design. For about a decade, she primarily did set design work, only to return to costume design again around 1940 for the final phase of her career.

In the 1930s she also began to write, with two books published by Knopf, a highly respected publisher at that time. She was personal friends with Alfred and Blanche Knopf.

Her first book, Three Blue Suits, helped to more firmly establish her as a designer in New York. The book included a series of three stories in which three very different men wear the same blue serge suit. The details of how each man wears — or drags (the jacket on the floor) — his suit, reveal aspects of each man's character in subtle ways. A common trope among costume designer is that costumes, if they are good, should ultimately not be noticed. In contrast, the blue suit stories reveal Bernstein's ability to discern how critical details of costume evoke, and interact with, a character, and ultimately her skill as a costume designer at making this happen effectively.

Some of her publications include:

- Three Blue Suits (collection of short stories), 1933
- The Journey Down (over her relationship with Wolfe), Knopf, 1938
- Miss Condon, Knopf, 1947
- An Actor's Daughter (memoir), 1940
- The Martha Washington Doll Book, 1945
- Masterpieces of Women's Costume of the 18th and 19th Centuries, 1959 (published posthumously)

In 1950, Aline Bernstein finally won some hard-earned recognition. In 1949 she had designed costumes for the opera Regina. The music and libretto were written by Marc Blitzstein but based on the play The Little Foxes by Lillian Hellman, a play for which Bernstein had previously designed costumes. Although that production of Regina (it would be regularly revived in the 20th century) ran for only a month and a half, Bernstein won a Tony for her costume design in 1950.

== Personal life ==
Aline married Theodore F. Bernstein, a Wall Street broker, on November 19, 1902. Bernstein and her husband had two children: Theodore Frankau Bernstein (1904–1949), and Edla Cusick (1906–1983). Her marriage remained intact throughout and despite her affair with Thomas Wolfe.

Bernstein died on September 7, 1955, in New York City, aged 74.

=== Relationship with Thomas Wolfe ===
I am deliberately writing [Look Homeward, Angel] for two or three people, first and chiefest, for you.

— Thomas Wolfe, My Other Loneliness: Letters of Thomas Wolfe and Aline Bernstein

Bernstein met Thomas Wolfe in 1925 aboard the RMS Olympic when Wolfe was 25 and Bernstein 44. (Note: Approximately. Some sources give Wolfe's age as 24, others as 25; some sources give Bernsteins age as 44, others as 45, at the time of this meeting.) Bernstein became Wolfe's lover and provided Wolfe with emotional, domestic, and financial support while he wrote his first novel, Look Homeward, Angel, which he dedicated to Bernstein.

Wolfe immortalized Bernstein as the character Esther Jack in his novels Of Time and the River, The Web and the Rock, You Can't Go Home Again, and The Good Child's River. Bernstein, in turn, centered her autobiographical novel The Journey Down around her affair with Wolfe. Bernstein's and Wolfe's affair ended after a few years, but their friendship continued. One of Wolfe's last phone calls, when he was dying of a brain tumor at age 37, was to tell Bernstein he loved her. At the time of Wolfe's death in 1938, Bernstein possessed some of Wolfe's unpublished manuscripts.

In the 2016 biographical drama film Genius, Bernstein was portrayed by Nicole Kidman, while Wolfe was portrayed by Jude Law.
