= Thomas Wolfe House =

Historic house in North Carolina, United States

- U.S. National Register of Historic Places
- U.S. National Historic Landmark
- U.S. Historic district – Contributing property
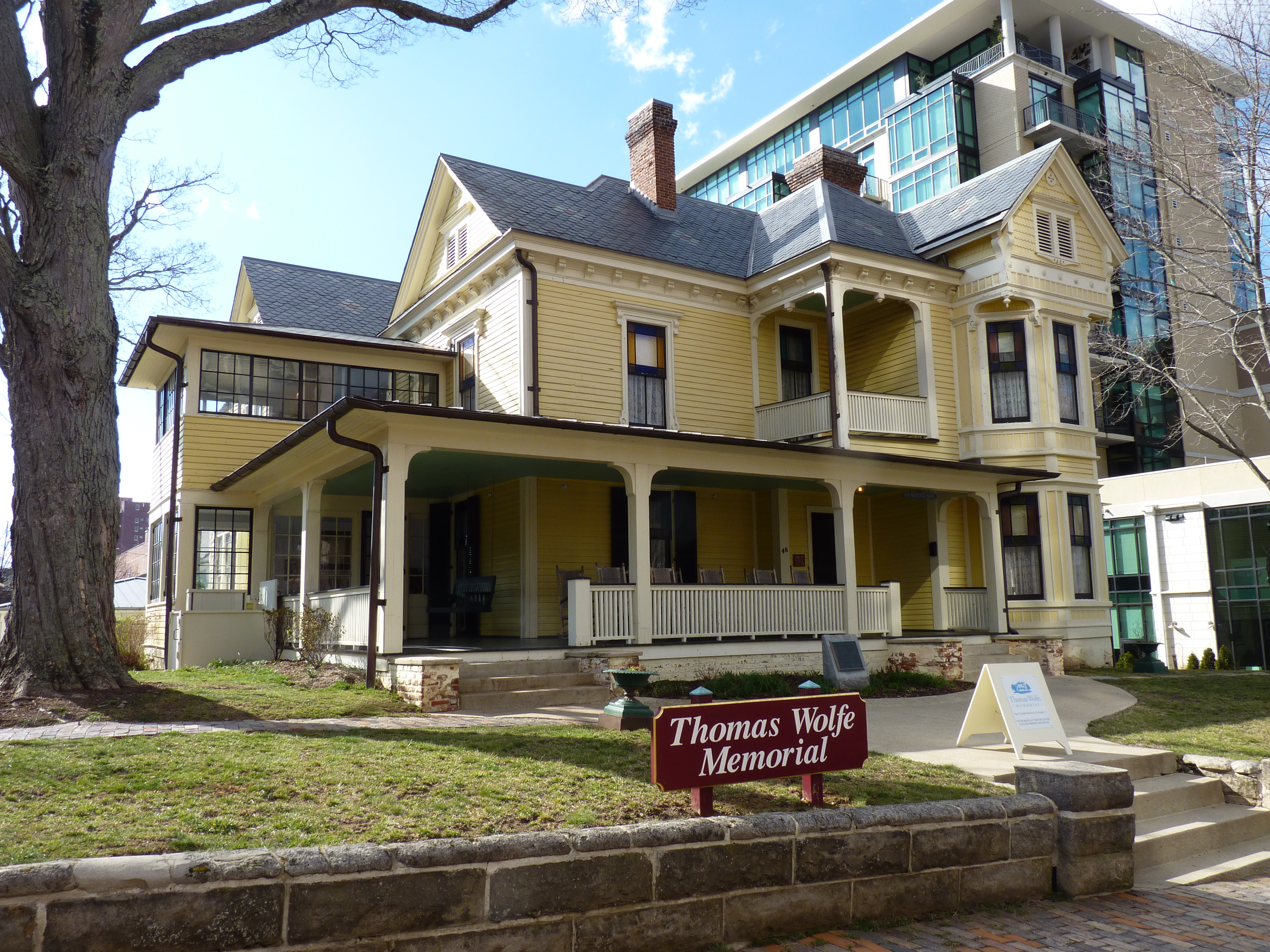

- Location within North Carolina Location within the United States
- Location: 52 North Market Street, Asheville, North Carolina
- Coordinates: 35°35′51″N 82°33′03″W
- Built: 1883
- Architectural style: Queen Anne
- Part of: Downtown Asheville Historic District (ID79001676)
- NRHP reference No.: 71000572

Significant dates
- Added to NRHP: November 11, 1971
- Designated NHL: November 11, 1971
- Designated CP: April 26, 1979

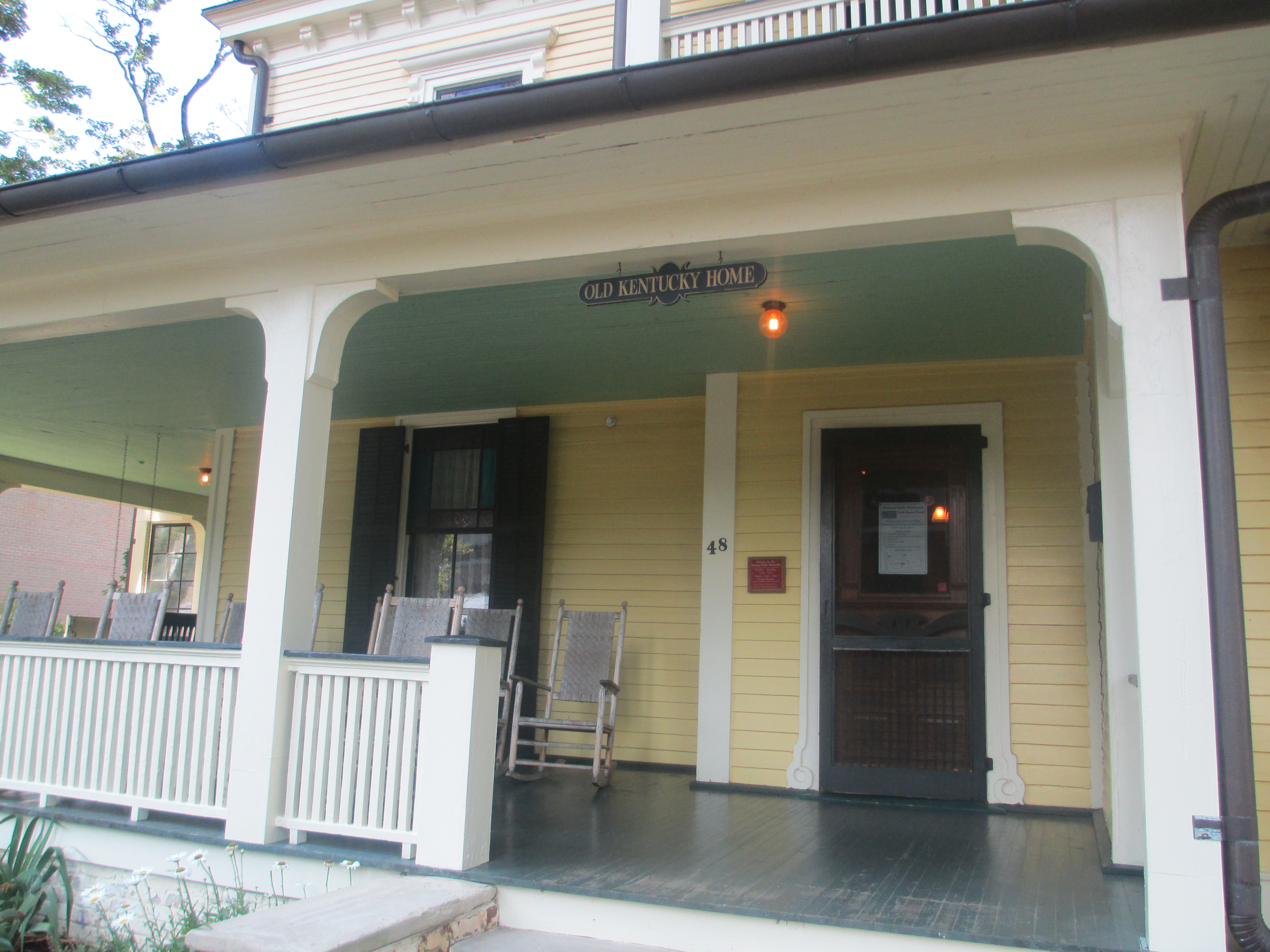
Front porch of Wolfe's "Old Kentucky Home"

The Thomas Wolfe House, also known as the Thomas Wolfe Memorial, is a state historic site, historic house and museum located at 52 North Market Street in downtown Asheville, North Carolina. The American author Thomas Wolfe (1900–1938) lived in the home during his boyhood. The house was designated a National Historic Landmark in 1971 for its association with Wolfe. It is located in the Downtown Asheville Historic District.

== History ==
The two-story frame house was built in 1883, influenced by Queen Anne style architecture in the United States. By 1906, when Wolfe's mother, Julia E. (Westall) Wolfe (1860–1945), bought the house, it was a boarding house named "Old Kentucky Home". She soon went to live at her business with Tom, while the other Wolfes remained at their Woodfin Street residence. Wolfe lived at the boarding house until he went to the University of North Carolina in 1916. Julia Wolfe enlarged the house in 1917 by adding five rooms.

Wolfe used the house as the setting for his first novel, Look Homeward, Angel (1929). Changing the name of his mother's boarding house to "Dixieland" in his autobiographical fiction, he incorporated his own experiences among family, friends and boarders into the book.

The house became a memorial to Wolfe after his mother's death (he having died relatively young of tuberculosis). It has been open to visitors since the 1950s, owned by the state of North Carolina Department of Natural and Cultural Resources since 1976 and designated as a National Historic Landmark. In 1998, 200 of the house's 800 original artifacts and the house's dining room were destroyed by a fire set by an arsonist during the Bele Chere street festival. The perpetrator remains unknown. After a $2.4 million restoration, the house reopened in 2003.

== See also ==
- List of National Historic Landmarks in North Carolina
- National Register of Historic Places listings in Buncombe County, North Carolina
- List of residences of American writers
