= Aswell =

Aswell is a surname. Notable people with the surname include:

- Edward Aswell (1900–1958), American editor
- James Benjamin Aswell (1869–1931), American educator and politician
