= Excavator (album) =

Studio album by stephaniesǐd
- Released: 9 June 2015
- Studio: Southern Tracks
- Genre: Indie pop
- Length: 44:26
- Label: Mint 400 Records
- Producer: Vic Stafford, Stephanie Morgan

Stephaniesǐd chronology
starfruit (2011)	Excavator (2015)

Excavator is the fifth studio album from the American pop band stephaniesǐd.

== Content ==
The eleven-track album was released with Mint 400 Records, on 9 June 2015. It was recorded by Vic Stafford at Southern Tracks in Atlanta, Georgia, and at Stephanie Morgan's home in Asheville, North Carolina. It was produced by Stafford and Morgan, and mastered by Johnny Horesco IV, at OneUp Mastering. Excavator features cello, saxophone, trumpet, trombone, violin, flugelhorn, upright bass, heavy drums, and sweeping, symphonic crescendos. The album is described pop-noir with operatic, soul and rhythmic directions, and it draws comparison to the music of Portishead, Fiona Apple, Tori Amos, and Florence and the Machine. Excavator delves into themes of hope, fear, aspiration, ambition, failure and acceptance, with Morgan noting the album "is called Excavator because it is an excavation of my true human spirit."

"Did You Say" and "Love is the New Black" were released as singles, and the music video for "Love is the New Black" was released on 2 November 2015. It contains footage of the band performing in the forest, interspersed with children playing and inhabiting the band members' while they are performing. In an interview with Blurt, Morgan explains that the song "Love is the New Black" is about "a person who struggles with love. She wants to be open and connective with other people, but she feels fear of being too vulnerable. Ultimately, this is a song about love winning over fear. No one is perfect at love, and that's the beauty! Humanness." The record release party for Excavator was held at Isis Music Hall in Asheville, North Carolina, on 2 May 2015, with Hudson K as the opening act.

== Reception ==
WNC calls Excavator "nothing short of a musical meditation[;] Morgan leaps out of a scratchy violin intro, quickly transforming a quiet monologue into an electrified incantation." Emily Patrick of Asheville Citizen-Timessays the album is "the three-piece group is at its best," adding that "during an era of dense, electronic production sounds, there's plenty of space on the tracks on Excavator [and] the jazz sensibilities blend so seamlessly into the pop tunes."

"Love is the New Black" is described as "a slow build showcasing the many facets of vocalist Stephanie Morgan's voice. And there's a studiousness to Tim Haney's percussion[,] the kind of focused fervor that could karate chop bricks just as well as propel an indie-pop song with shimmering precision and sinewy snare" by Mountain Xpress, who also notes the stand-out track "I Will Not Be Famous" is a "waltzing, uplifting meditation on the idea of doing great work in obscurity [with] lithe and moody piano."

== Track listing ==
No.	Title	Length
1.	"Shawshank"	3:59
2.	"Did You Say"	3:18
3.	"I Will Not Be Famous"	3:12
4.	"Love is the New Black"	4:21
5.	"Rock Baby"	3:49
6.	"Battery Room"	3:06
7.	"Still Asleep"	3:57
8.	"Baseball Player"	4:04
9.	"My Funny Valentine"	3:16
10.	"Are You Well?"	5:40
11.	"Coffee"	4:44
Total length:		44:26

== Personnel ==
- Tim Haney – drums
- Chuck Licthenberger – piano, keyboards
- Stephanie Morgan – lead vocals, synths and guitar on "Are You Well," "Battery Room," "Famous" and "Rock Baby"

=== Additional musicians ===
- Sarah Hurd – violin
- Pam Jones – vocals on "Coffee"
- Michael Libramento – guitar on "Did You Say," "Still Asleep," "Coffee," and "Baseball Player"
- Caleb McMahon – trombone
- Jonathan Pearlman – guitar on "My Funny Valentine"
- Justin Ray – trumpet and flugelhorn
- Jacob Rodriguez – saxophones
- Georgia Sinko – cello
- Craig Sandberg – upright bass
- Vic Stafford – key bass, synths and percussion on "Shawshank"
- Kristen Thornhill – vocals on "Coffee"
- Krista Tortora – vocals on "Coffee"
