= The Hills Beyond =

The Hills Beyond is a novel by Thomas Wolfe, published posthumously in 1941. Like his earlier novels The Web and the Rock and You Can't Go Home Again, it was extracted by Edward Aswell from a larger manuscript after Wolfe's death.

The Hills Beyond is usually considered an unfinished novel, but it has also been described as a collection of sketches, stories, and novellas. The Hills Beyond was created by Aswell mainly by taking a group of chapters cut from the beginning of Wolfe's original epic manuscript and attaching sketches from various other sources.

The book tells the story of the Joyner family in North Carolina from before the Civil War to the 1930s. The Joyners are the maternal ancestors and relatives of George Webber, the fictional character, based on Wolfe himself, who is the protagonist of his posthumously published novels The Web and the Rock and You Can't Go Home Again.

The New York Times Book Review wrote that The Hills Beyond "contains some of [Wolfe's] best, and certainly his most mature, work".
