= The Web and the Rock =

Novel by Thomas Wolfe

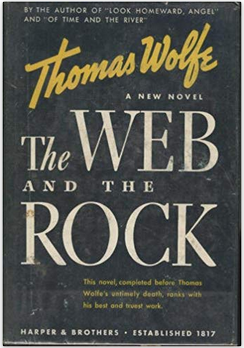
- Author: Thomas Wolfe
- Language: English
- Genre: Bildungsroman
- Set in: North Carolina, New York City, Europe
- Publisher: Harper & Sons
- Publication date: 1939
- Publication place: United States
- Pages: 695
- OCLC: 588795334
- Followed by: You Can't Go Home Again
- Text: The Web and the Rock at Internet Archive

The Web and the Rock is an American bildungsroman novel by Thomas Wolfe, published posthumously in 1939. Like its sequel, You Can't Go Home Again (and also The Hills Beyond) it was extracted by Edward Aswell from a larger manuscript after Wolfe's death.

== Description ==
The novel's protagonist is George "Monk" Webber, a novelist from North Carolina who is clearly based on Wolfe himself and is reminiscent of Eugene Gant, the protagonist of Wolfe's earlier novels Look Homeward, Angel and Of Time and the River, also based by Wolfe on himself.

Wolfe believed that the book represented an artistic evolution for him, which is why he changed the name of the protagonist from Eugene Gant to George Webber, who was also more mature and aware than Gant. The book, which like all of Wolfe's major works mirrors Wolfe's own life experience, takes Webber from a Southern small-town boyhood to college (with its escape from the "web" of family ties), to New York City where he seeks the meaning of life and attempts to establish himself as a novelist, engages in a stormy affair with the sophisticated married woman Esther Jack (based on Wolfe's real-life affair with Aline Bernstein). Although Esther is very supportive of Monk and even tries to help him get his lengthy novel published, their relations are tempestuous; resenting his dependence on her, he storms off to Europe. During his travels in Europe, he is torn between what he calls the desires of his Mind and his Body and finally becomes conflicted with the inspiration of foreign lands and the recollections of his youth. He dreams of returning to his hometown, but realizes that he can't recapture the past: the book's ending words are the title of his next novel – "you can't go home again."

'That is the good time because it is the time the sunlight came and went upon the porch, and when there was a sound of people coming home at noon, earth loaming, grass spermatic, a fume of rope-sperm in the nostrils and the dewlaps of the throat, torpid, thick, and undelightful, the humid commonness of housewives turbaned with a dish-clout, the small dreariness of As-They-Are mixed in with humid turnip greens, and houses aired to morning, the turned mattress and the beaten rug, the warm and common mucus of the earth-nasturtium smells, the thought of parlors and the good stale smell, the sudden, brooding stretch of absence of the street car after it had gone, and a feeling touched with desolation hoping noon would come. ... That was a good time then.' 'Yes,' said Body. 'But – you can't go home again.'

— Thomas Wolfe, The Web and the Rock

== Creation ==
In May 1938, Wolfe gave his manuscript to his new editor, Edward Aswell. According to John Halberstadt, "It was not a finished product in any sense. It was a collection of materials that [Wolfe's previous editor], Maxwell Perkins had cut from earlier novels, previously published sketches or even short novels, chapters in variant versions, fragments, new writing — only the 'enormous skeleton' of a novel... perhaps one and a quarter million words, some five thousand pages, over two hundred chapters." Wolfe then left New York City and died later that year.

Thus, The Web and the Rock was very heavily edited by Aswell. According to Halberstadt, Wolfe's later books (including The Web and the Rock) were "not really written by Wolfe in the usual sense but were predominantly the work of... Aswell." Aswell removed the entire first section (covering Webber's ancestors) and later published this as a separate work, The Hills Beyond. Aswell then crafted a new opening, cut fifty chapters, and recast other chapters by combining sections of various chapters and writing connective material himself. Unused parts of the manuscript would later be published as You Can't Go Home Again.

Wolfe's biographer David Herbert Donald complained that Aswell's work was butchery and went well beyond the proper remit of an editor: "From standardizing the names and the tenses of Wolfe's manuscript, Aswell moved on to modifying the rhythm of his prose, to altering his characterizations, and to cutting and shaping his chapters. Greatly exceeding the professional responsibility of an editor, Aswell took impermissible liberties with Wolfe's manuscript, and his interference seriously eroded the integrity of Wolfe's text. Far from deserving commendation, Aswell's editorial interference was, both from the standpoint of literature and of ethics, unacceptable"

Harold Bloom, however, praised Aswell's work: "Wolfe's Byronic blank verse (very blank) masking as prose, left pretty much unaltered by Maxwell Perkins, is less tiresomely obtrusive after being worked over by Aswell."

Leo Gurko, in his book Thomas Wolfe: Beyond the Romantic Ego, wrote of the book "Read, as it should be, as an intensely articulated mural, first of the provincial and then, climatically, of the urban landscape, it not only does not suffer by comparison with its famous predecessor, but is not to be compared [with anything else]". Kirkus Reviews described The Web and the Rock as a further example of Wolfe's "utter inability to select and discard, his obsession with himself and his actions and motives and emotional turmoils" coupled with his "queer streak of genius", resulting in a "turgid outpouring of his own emotional life, put into fictional form" which demonstrates "the same weaknesses, even more sharply emphasized, and the same sense of power that made his earlier work memorable".
