= Kenneth Raisbeck =

American playwright and screenwriter (1899–1931)

Kenneth Raisbeck (January 5, 1899 – September 30, 1931) was an American playwright and screenwriter. He co-authored the screenplays for Knockout Reilly and The Gay Defender, both released by Paramount Pictures in 1927. Two of his three plays were briefly performed on Broadway: Torches and Rock Me, Julie. He is best remembered today for his close association with the novelist Thomas Wolfe whom he befriended while they were both students at Harvard University. Wolfe based the character of Francis Starwick in his semi-autobiographical novel Of Time and the River (1935) on Raisbeck.

The circumstances surrounding Raisbeck's death at the age of 32 have been the source of controversy. While the police deemed his death a murder by strangulation, a medical examiner initially determined that his death was the result of a brain infection that led to acute meningitis. This dispute among officials was widely reported in the press at the time of Raisbeck's death. Ultimately, the medical examiner retracted his original opinion and supported the death by strangulation finding, and Raisbeck's death was officially ruled a murder at an inquest. A formal investigation into his death was made following that ruling, but his killer was never found. Some 21st-century scholars have speculated that Raisbeck, who was openly gay, may have been the victim of a hate crime.

== Life and career ==
Born Kenneth Romaver-Ron Raisbeck in Odell, Illinois, on January 5, 1899, Raisbeck was the youngest of nine children. He graduated from Bloomington High School in 1916, and entered Harvard University as a freshman in August of that year. At Harvard he studied playwriting with George Pierce Baker, and after his graduation with a Bachelor of Arts degree in 1921 he worked as Baker's graduate assistant from 1921 to 1924 in his "47 Workshop" playwriting course. He maintained a friendship with Baker after this period and spent time visiting Baker at his home in New Hampshire during the summers.

At Harvard, Raisbeck was openly gay. In 1920 he befriended the writer Thomas Wolfe who was also studying at the university. The two maintained a close friendship for the next several years, and in 1926 (Note: The abstract to Raisbeck's personal papers held in the Harvard Library indicate this event occurred in 1926. However other published sources have claimed this event occurred in 1924 and in 1925.) they toured Paris together along with Marjorie Crocker Fairbanks and Helen Harding. At some point during this trip the two men had an argument and the friendship ceased. Wolfe's 1935 semi-autobiographical novel Of Time and the River, written four years after Raisbeck's death, based one of its main characters, Francis Starwick, on Raisbeck.

While an undergraduate student at Harvard, Raisbeck's first play, the one-act work Torches, premiered at the Morosco Theatre in New York City on April 18, 1921, as part of a series of public performances featuring plays created by the students in Baker's "47 Workshop" course. This play was later performed on Broadway at the Nora Bayes Theatre on May 10, 1923, in a production directed by Clara Low as part of the "Little Theatre Tournament" in which 20 different plays by promising American playwrights were given their Broadway debuts under the auspices of the New York Drama League.

Raisbeck's second play, Rock Me, Julie premiered at Broadway's Royale Theatre on February 3, 1931, in a production directed by James Light. The play starred Paul Muni and Jean Adair and was produced by Morris Green and Lewis E. Gensler. It ran for just seven performances. His third play, The Lady of Spain, remained unfinished at the time of Raisbeck's death at the age of 32.

Raisbeck spent some time working as a screenwriter in Hollywood. He co-authored the scripts to two films released by Paramount Pictures in 1927: Knockout Reilly and The Gay Defender.

== Death ==
Kenneth Raisbeck died on September 30, 1931, in Westport, Connecticut. His body was found in Christ Church Cemetery in Westport. The circumstances surrounding his death were disputed at the time, and have remained controversial. The Westport, Connecticut Police department ruled that Raisbeck was murdered and pointed to physical evidence of strangulation on Raisbeck's neck. However, a medical examiner initially ruled that Raisbeck died from a bacterial infection in the brain. Various scholars on Raisbeck have supported both claims, and opinions are divided. However, most sources support the claim of strangulation because the medical examiner later overturned his initial finding of death due to acute meningitis in favor of death by strangulation, and an official inquest ruled his death a murder. A subsequent investigation by detectives failed to catch Raisbeck's murderer. Some 21st-century scholars have speculated that due to Raisbeck's sexuality he may have been the victim of a hate crime.
