= Genius (2016 film) =

2016 British-American biographical drama film by Michael Grandage

- Theatrical release poster
- Directed by: Michael Grandage
- Screenplay by: John Logan
- Based on: Max Perkins: Editor of Genius by A. Scott Berg
- Produced by: James Bierman; Michael Grandage; John Logan; Tracey Seaward
- Starring: Colin Firth; Jude Law; Nicole Kidman; Laura Linney; Guy Pearce; Dominic West
- Cinematography: Ben Davis
- Edited by: Chris Dickens
- Music by: Adam Cork
- Production companies: Summit Entertainment; Desert Wolf Productions; Michael Grandage Company
- Distributed by: Lionsgate; Roadside Attractions
- Release dates: February 16, 2016 (Berlin); June 10, 2016 (United States)
- Running time: 104 minutes
- Countries: United Kingdom; United States
- Language: English
- Budget: $17 million
- Box office: $5.7 million

Genius is a 2016 biographical drama film directed by Michael Grandage and written by John Logan, based on the 1978 National Book Award-winner Max Perkins: Editor of Genius by A. Scott Berg. The film stars Colin Firth, Jude Law, Nicole Kidman, Laura Linney, Dominic West, and Guy Pearce. It was selected to compete for the Golden Bear at the 66th Berlin International Film Festival.

== Plot ==
In 1929, in New York City, Maxwell Perkins is a successful editor at Scribner's and discoverer of great authors such as F. Scott Fitzgerald and Ernest Hemingway. He lives in a "cottage"—actually, a mansion—just outside the city with his wife and five daughters.

One day, in his office, he reads the drafts of O Lost, a novel by Thomas Wolfe. Struck by the content, Perkins decides to publish it and begins to collaborate with the author. It is eventually published as Look Homeward, Angel and proves to be a commercial success: 15 thousand copies sold in a month.

Perkins and Wolfe become best friends, while Wolfe's relationship with Aline Bernstein, a married woman 20 years his senior, is severely tested after the novel's publication. Max manages to publish Wolfe's successful second novel, Of Time and the River, after several years of exhausting revision.

Wolfe is in Paris where he follows the events remotely, thanks to news received from Perkins. On his return to New York, he immediately goes to work, writing his new book. His turbulent character leads him to quarrel with Perkins, destroying the relationship between them, resulting in Wolfe turning to another editor.

Aline finally leaves Wolfe, because she feels he needs to experience how to be truly alone. After Perkins has reconciled himself with Wolfe's absence, a phone call comes from Wolfe's mother: he has contracted miliary tuberculosis. Despite surgery, Wolfe shows no signs of improving. After a few weeks he dies but before dying he writes a letter to Max, expressing his immense affection for him.

== Cast ==
- Colin Firth as Maxwell Perkins
- Jude Law as Thomas Wolfe
- Nicole Kidman as Aline Bernstein
- Dominic West as Ernest Hemingway
- Guy Pearce as F. Scott Fitzgerald
- Laura Linney as Louise Perkins
- Vanessa Kirby as Zelda Fitzgerald
- Makenna McBrierty as Nancy Perkins

== Production ==
=== Filming ===
Principal photography began on October 19, 2014, in Manchester, and ended on December 12, 2014. Filming also took place on Water Street, Liverpool.

== Release ==
The film was released on June 10, 2016. It had its premiere at the 66th Berlin International Film Festival on February 16, 2016.

=== Critical response ===
On Rotten Tomatoes, the film has a rating of 52% based on 111 reviews and an average rating of 5.90/10. The site's critical consensus reads, "Genius seeks to honor worthy subjects, yet never gets close enough to the titular quality to make watching worth the effort". On Metacritic, the film has a weighted average score of 56 out of 100, based on 23 critics, indicating "mixed or average" reviews.

Among the British reviews of the film, The Guardian wrote, "Michael Grandage's debut film, on Thomas Wolfe and his literary editor Maxwell Perkins, is hammily acted, overstylised and lacking in subtlety", while The Independent wrote, "The acting, along with John Logan's script, belongs to the theatre". The Daily Telegraph, meanwhile, had this to say about the film: "All the blaring trumpets and martinis the director can fling us as jazzy background don't save the film from being very unappealingly lit indeed—full of drab, grey interiors, it's halfway to monochrome."

Among the American reviews, meanwhile, Variety opined, "Though Michael Grandage's dull, dun-colored Genius makes every effort to credit the editor's role in shaping the century's great novels, it's nobody's idea of interesting to watch someone wield his red pencil over the pile of pages that would become Thomas Wolfe's Look Homeward, Angel, even if the editor in question is the great Maxwell Perkins. While the talent involved should draw smarthouse crowds, the result has all the life of a flower pressed between Angel's pages 87 years ago." The Hollywood Reporter was similarly unimpressed, writing, "The insurmountable problem, however, is that the story engages only late in the game, once Tom has betrayed his father figure by revising his previous acknowledgment of the role Max played in molding his genius. But perhaps due to the anesthetizing effect of most of what's come before, the central relationship lacks spark and the pathos remains muted. Even scenes that should burst with excitement, such as Tom loosening up sober Max in a Harlem jazz club, are like CPR on a lifeless body." The New York Times also found the film unsatisfactory, writing, "Genius is a dress-up box full of second- and third-hand notions. Set mainly in a picturesquely brown and smoky Manhattan in the 1930s, it gives the buddy-movie treatment to that wild-man novelist Thomas Wolfe and his buttoned-up red-penciler Maxwell Perkins." Rolling Stone had the same impression, writing, "You know the drill: Strong source material, in the form of A. Scott Berg's National Book Award-winning biography on Perkins, a top-notch screenwriter (John Logan) and a to-die-for A-list cast. Having all the right ingredients doesn't mean you can't royally screw up the recipe, however, and the missteps start coming fast and furious even before Law's manic-hillbilly act wears out its welcome."
