= Stephaniesǐd =

American indie pop band

stephaniesǐd
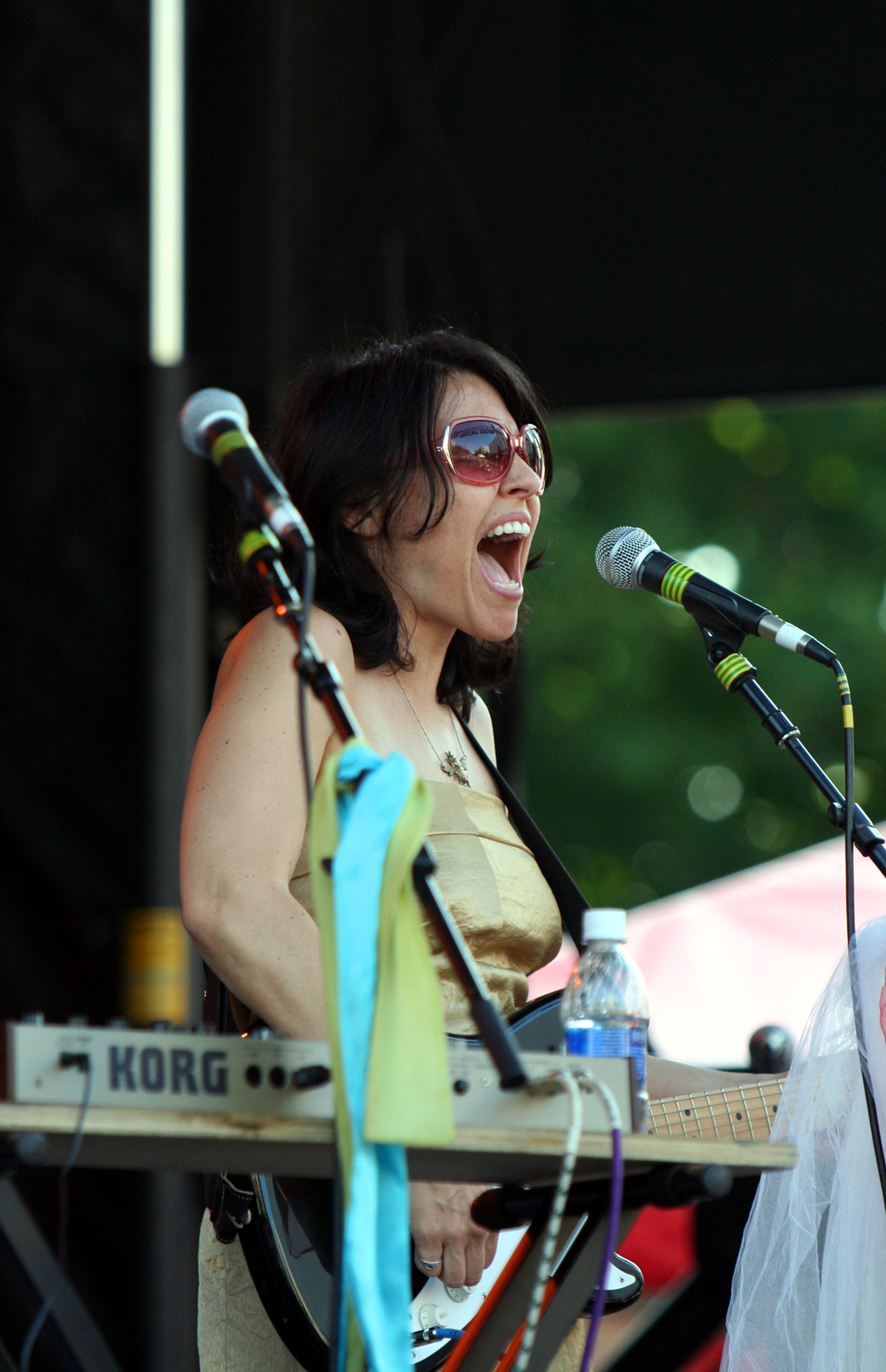
- Morgan performing with stephaniesǐd at the 2009 Bele Chere festival.

Background information
- Also known as: Stephanie's Id, stephanie's Äd, stephaniesÄd
- Origin: Asheville, North Carolina, U.S.
- Genres: Indie pop
- Years active: 2001–2016
- Labels: Sid Music, Nine Mile Records, Mint 400 Records
- Members: Stephanie Morgan
- Website: stephaniemorgan.com

stephaniesǐd was an American indie pop band from North Carolina. Band member Stephanie Morgan now performs as the solo artist Pink Mercury.

== History ==
stephaniesǐd was an indie pop band from Asheville, North Carolina, which formed in 2001, that performed predominately as a duo of vocalist and keyboardist Stephanie Morgan (now frontperson for Pink Mercury), and keyboardist and vocalist Chuck Lichtenberger (now frontperson for My Magnificent Nemesis). Morgan notes that nearly thirty people have played with the band over its entire history. stephaniesǐd describe themselves as "indie pop" or "pop-noir," and Morgan cites musical influence from the Bee Gees, the Beatles, British pop music, and bands on the 4AD record label. Their style is called "alt pop-rock noir" and "soulful dream-pop," and NPR says their music is a "beguiling mix of sounds with unexpected sonic turns, as hushed, serene songs erupt suddenly into dark, explosive jams." The band incorporates trombone, trumpet, melodica, horns and vibraphones into its music.

Morgan explains the "ǐd" in the band name in an interview with Blurt, saying "the 'id' allusion is of course to the Freudian/Jungian seat of all impulses and desires, which I frame as mine or anyone else's 'guts' or proverbial 'little light.'" The name changed to "Stephanie's Id" after pronunciation issues, however, the band encountered problems with the name being mistaken for identification, as in "Stephanie's ID," so, remembering a book from her childhood that used "sound spellings," it was changed again to "stephanie's īd" and "stephaniesīd."

=== Early years ===
Initially, Morgan assembled a group of jazz players to play pop compositions. After taking a break, she met classically trained jazz pianist Chuck Lichtenberger. Morgan needed a substitute pianist for a jazz standards group with which she was performing, and she asked Lichtenberger to perform with her. They started out playing shows with only the two of them, but later brought on drummer Vic Stafford, who later produced three of stephaniesǐd's albums. stephaniesǐd's debut album, Spiral In, was released on 15 April 2004 on their label, Sid Music. It was included in the Top 100 National Releases, by public radio station WNCW. The Asheville Ballet choreographed a ballet entitled ANNA! A Rock Ballet to music of the album. Jane featured the single "Popsicles" on their 2005 Jane Magazine Reader CD.

In July 2006, stephaniesǐd premiered at Bele Chere, a music and arts street festival in North Carolina. The band also started the POPAsheville festival, an indie pop and indie rock music festival which took place annually for several years, until 2009. This EP is Money was released in 2006, on Sid Music. The song "White Guys Selling Cars" won third prize in the Unisong International Song Contest's social/political category. The single "Unmistakably Love" has appeared on two national compilations, as well as compilations released by CMJ and Paste.

=== Nine Mile Records ===
In 2007, stephaniesǐd signed with the Austin, Texas-based record label Nine Mile Records. They released the album Grus Americanus, on 15 September 2007. It is described as a "mix [of] gentle pop rhythms with simple piano, guitar, some strings and subtle synth flourishes [that] creates a hazy backdrop for singer Stephanie Morgan's seductive voice." stephaniesǐd performed at the 2008 Bonnaroo Music Festival, on the Cafe Acts stage. On 15 May 2009, they released Warm People, which NPR compares to the music of Björk, and Rilo Kiley. Morgan describes the album as "warm, and also orchestral in places, and kind of tells the story of the power of the connection between people." A review by Billboard notes that the "sound is anchored by the synths and keyboards of Morgan and her husband, co-songwriter Chuck Lichtenberger, and driven by Morgan's one-of-a-kind voice." The review closes with saying Warm People is "difficult to classify, but easy to love." Their fourth full-length album, starfruit, was released on 18 October 2011.

=== Mint 400 Records ===
stephaniesǐd signed with Mint 400 Records in 2015. The label reissued the albums Grus Americanus, Warm People and starfruit, and the live single "they won't know what to do with us." The eleven-track album, Excavator, was released on 9 June 2015, and is described as a "pop-noir offering [that] unearth[s] the depths and idiosyncracies of the emotions contained within a human." Emily Patrick of Asheville Citizen-Times notes that "during an era of dense, electronic production sounds, there's plenty of space on the tracks on Excavator, yet they're very intentionally arranged." They performed an acoustic rendition of the song "Love is the New Black" for the 2015 compilation, In a Mellow Tone.

== Band members (most recent incarnation) ==
- Stephanie Morgan – vocals, guitar, keyboard
- Chuck Lichtenberger - keyboard and key bass, backing vocals
- Timothy Haney - drums

=== Past members ===
- Vic Stafford – drums
- Matthew Richmond - vibraphone, drums
- Kari Richmond - drums, vibraphone
- Michael Libramento – guitar
- Kevin Rumley - drums
- Rob Geisler - bass
- Cameron Juroff - drums

== Discography ==
=== Albums ===
- Spiral In (2004)
- Grus Americanus (2007)
- Warm People (2009)
- starfruit (2011)
- Excavator (2015)

=== EPs ===
- This EP Is Money (2006)

=== Singles ===
- "they won't know what to do with us" (2013)

=== Appearing on ===
- The Paste Magazine CD Sampler (2007), issue No. 37
- In a Mellow Tone (2015)
