= 207 Hedda =

Main-belt asteroid

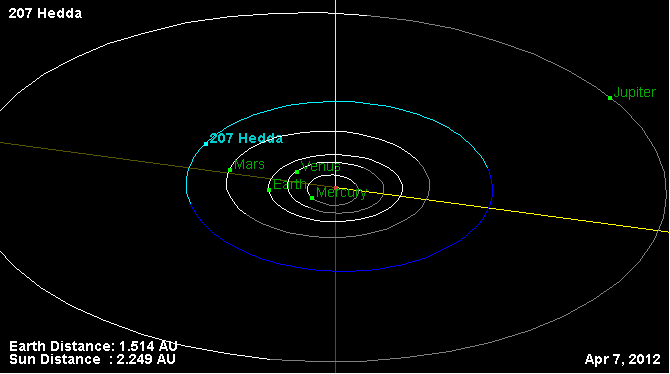
- Orbital diagram

Discovery
- Discovered by: Johann Palisa
- Discovery date: 17 October 1879

Designations
- Pronunciation: German: [ˈhɛdaː]
- Named after: Hedwig Winnecke
- Alternative designations: A879 UA, 1932 CL_{1} 1934 XJ, 1953 BF
- Minor planet category: Main belt

Orbital characteristics
- Epoch 31 July 2016 (JD 2457600.5)
- Uncertainty parameter 0
- Observation arc: 133.61 yr (48801 d)
- Aphelion: 2.3497 AU (351.51 Gm)
- Perihelion: 2.2177 AU (331.76 Gm)
- Semi-major axis: 2.2837 AU (341.64 Gm)
- Eccentricity: 0.028894
- Orbital period (sidereal): 3.45 yr (1260.5 d)
- Average orbital speed: 19.71 km/s
- Mean anomaly: 34.9926°
- Mean motion: 0° 17^{m} 8.124^{s} / day
- Inclination: 3.8036°
- Longitude of ascending node: 29.212°
- Time of perihelion: 2023-Feb-21
- Argument of perihelion: 192.936°

Physical characteristics
- Dimensions: 58.70±1.3 km
- Mass: (4.0±1.2)×10^{17} kg (Note: Calculated from its standard gravitational parameter GM = 0.027±0.008 km^{3}/s^{2}.)
- Mean density: 4.04 g/cm^{3} (Note: Assuming a diameter of 57.9 km.)
- Synodic rotation period: 30.098 h (1.2541 d); 19.489 h
- Geometric albedo: 0.0552±0.003
- Spectral type: C
- Absolute magnitude (H): 9.92

207 Hedda is a sizeable Main belt asteroid. It is a C-type asteroid, meaning it is primitive in composition and dark in colour. This asteroid was discovered by Johann Palisa on October 17, 1879, in Pola and was named after Hedwig Winnecke (née Dell), wife of astronomer Friedrich A. T. Winnecke.

Attempts to determine the rotation period for this asteroid have led to conflicting results. A study published in 2010 using photometric observations from Organ Mesa Observatory showed a rotation period of 19.489 ± 0.002 hours and a brightness variation of 0.18 ± 0.02 in magnitude.
