= The Gay Defender =

1927 film by Gregory La Cava

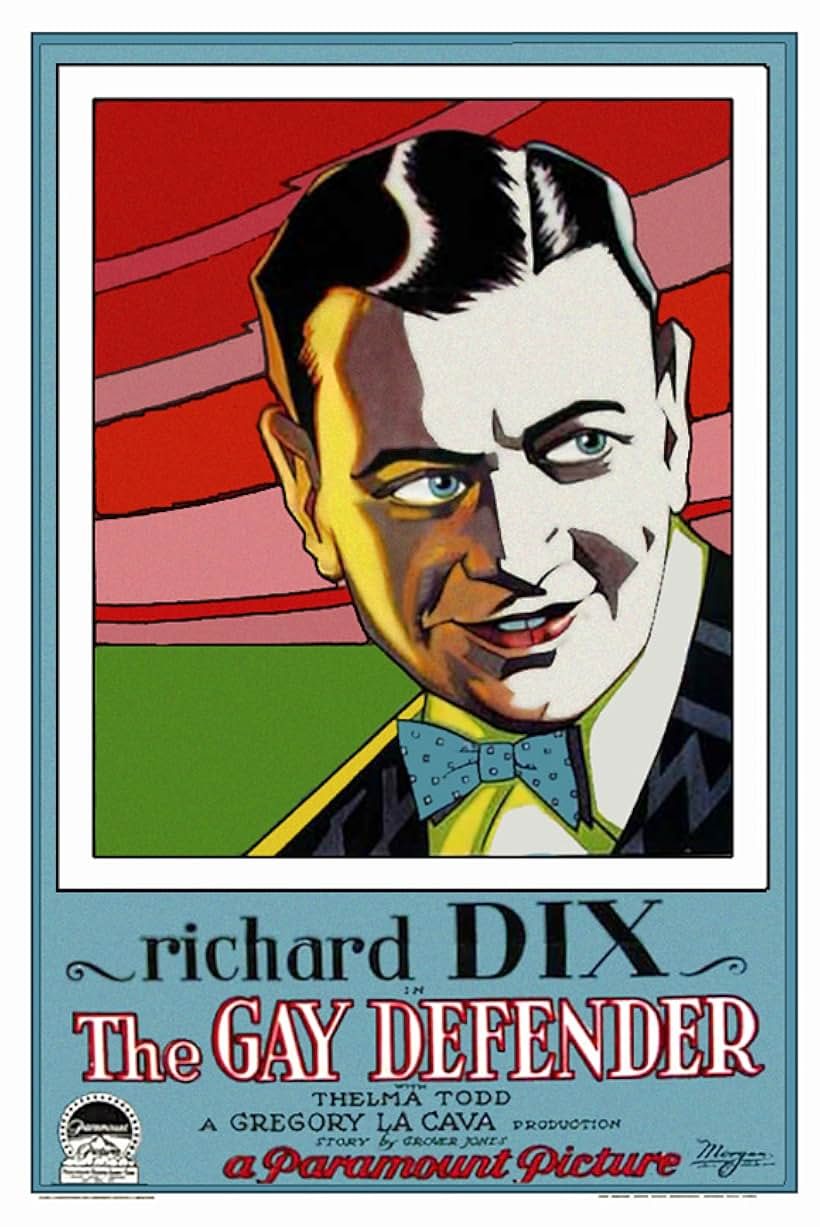
- Theatrical release poster
- Directed by: Gregory La Cava
- Screenplay by: Ray Harris; Grover Jones; Herman J. Mankiewicz; George Marion Jr. Sam Mintz; Kenneth Raisbeck
- Produced by: Jesse L. Lasky; Adolph Zukor
- Starring: Richard Dix; Thelma Todd; Fred Kohler; Jerry Mandy
- Cinematography: Edward Cronjager
- Production company: Famous Players–Lasky Corporation
- Distributed by: Paramount Pictures
- Release date: December 10, 1927
- Running time: 70 minutes
- Country: United States
- Language: Silent (English intertitles)

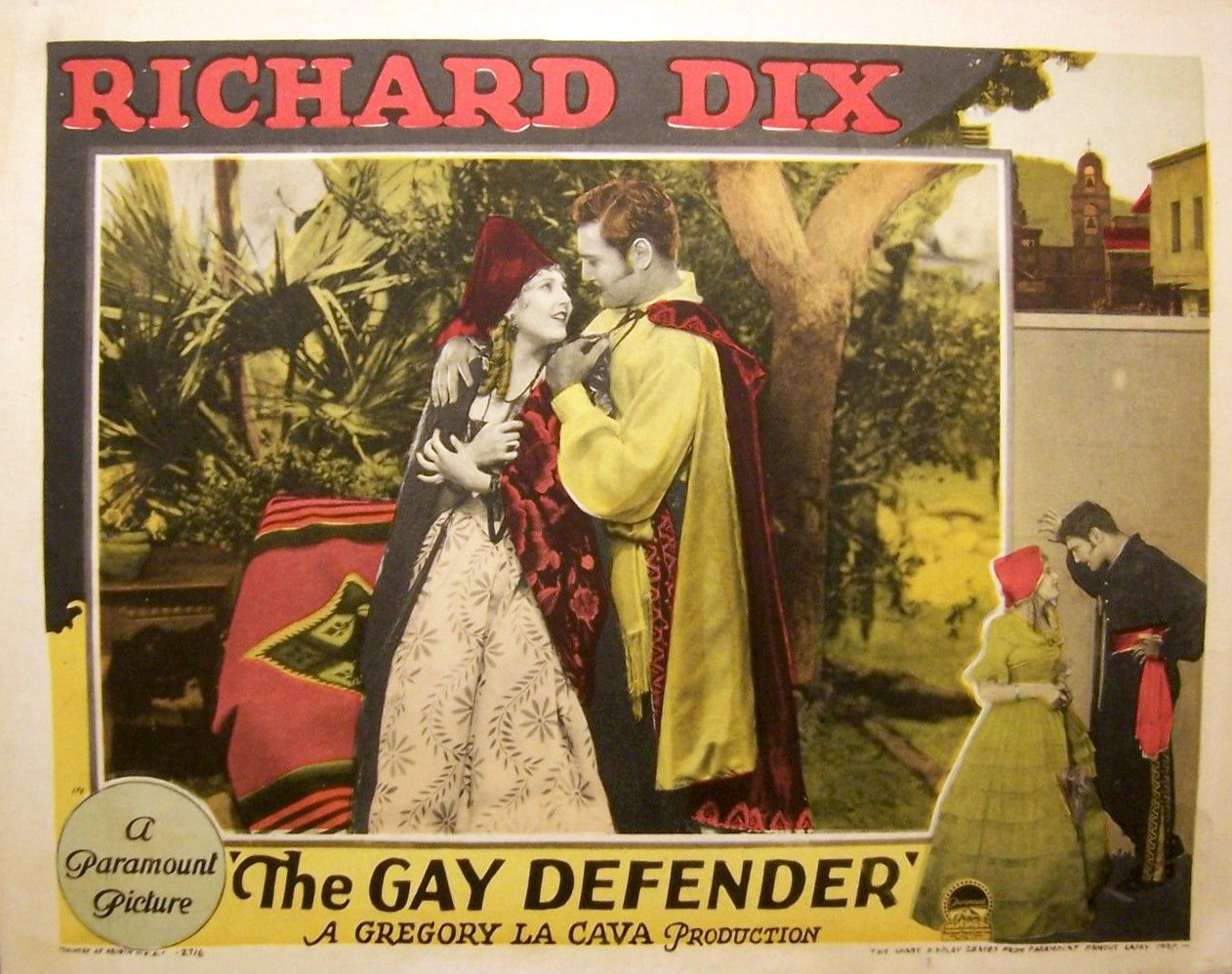
Lobby card for The Gay Defender

The Gay Defender is a lost 1927 American silent drama film directed by Gregory La Cava and written by Ray Harris, Grover Jones, Herman J. Mankiewicz, George Marion Jr., Sam Mintz, and Kenneth Raisbeck. The film stars Richard Dix, Thelma Todd, Fred Kohler, Jerry Mandy, Robert Brower, Harry Holden, and Fred Esmelton. The film was released on December 10, 1927, by Paramount Pictures.

== Cast ==
- Richard Dix as Joaquin Murrieta
- Thelma Todd as Ruth Ainsworth
- Fred Kohler as Jake Hamby
- Jerry Mandy as Chombo
- Robert Brower as Ferdinand Murrieta
- Harry Holden as Padre Sebastian
- Fred Esmelton as Commissioner Ainsworth
- Frances Raymond as Aunt Emily
- Ernie Adams as Bart Hamby
- Augustina López as Extra (uncredited)
