= Knockout Reilly =

1927 film

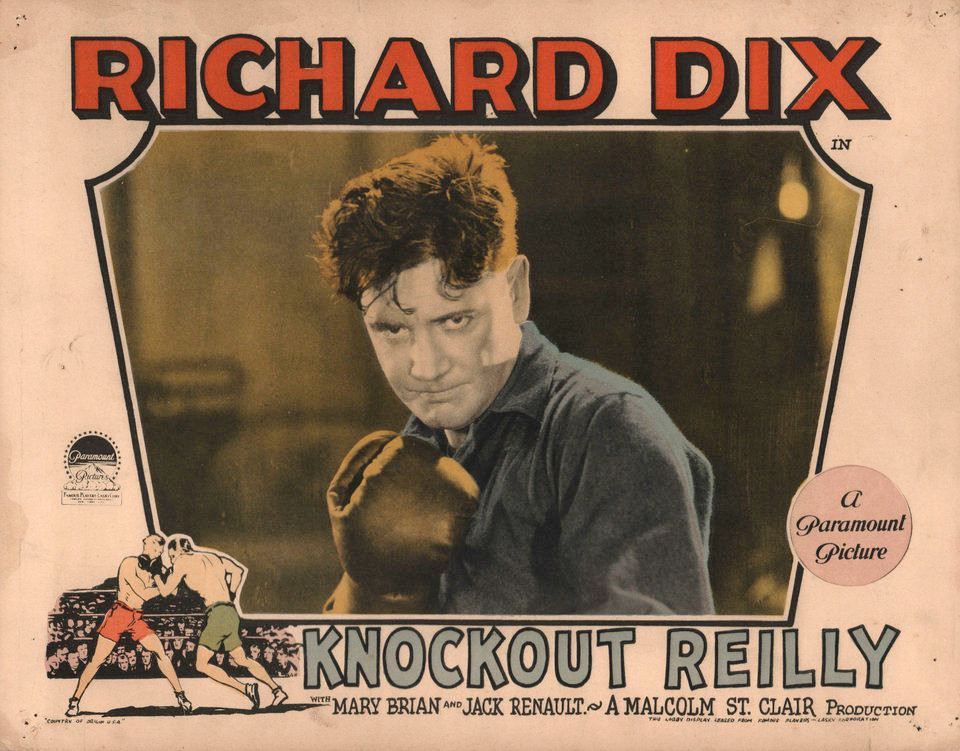
- lobby card
- Directed by: Malcolm St. Clair
- Screenplay by: Pierre Collings; John W. Conway; Kenneth Raisbeck
- Based on: "The Hunch" by Albert Payson Terhune
- Produced by: William LeBaron; Malcolm St. Clair; Jesse L. Lasky; Adolph Zukor
- Starring: Richard Dix; Mary Brian; Jack Renault; Harry Gribbon
- Cinematography: Edward Cronjager
- Production company: Famous Players–Lasky Corporation
- Distributed by: Paramount Pictures
- Release date: April 16, 1927
- Running time: 70 minutes
- Country: United States
- Language: Silent (English intertitles)

Knockout Reilly is a lost 1927 American silent drama film directed by Malcolm St. Clair and written by Pierre Collings, John W. Conway, and Kenneth Raisbeck based upon a story by Albert Payson Terhune. The film stars Richard Dix, Mary Brian, Jack Renault, Harry Gribbon, Osgood Perkins, and Lucia Backus Seger. The film was released on April 16, 1927, by Paramount Pictures.

== Plot ==
When a successful prizefighter known as "Killer" Agerra causes trouble in a nightclub, a New Jersey mill worker, Dundee Reilly, knocks him out. This impresses both Pat Malone, an ex-boxer, and Pat's attractive sister Mary, who takes a liking to Reilly. Reilly becomes a boxer under Pat's tutelage, but is framed for a crime and ends up serving nearly a year behind bars at hard labor. While incarcerated, he keeps up his training.When he gets out, Agerra's opponent in an upcoming fight drops out, so Pat Malone arranges for "Knockout" Reilly to be his replacement in the ring. Agerra is much too good for him. Reilly is on the verge of being knocked out when Mary Malone visits his corner and tells him it was Agerra who framed him and caused him to go to jail. A newly motivated Reilly knocks his foe flat.

== Cast ==
- Richard Dix as Dundee 'Knockout' Reilly
- Mary Brian as Mary Malone
- Jack Renault as Killer Agerra
- Harry Gribbon as Pat Malone
- Osgood Perkins as Spider Cross
- Lucia Backus Seger as Mrs. Reilly
- Larry McGrath as Kewpie Dugan
- John Merton as Buck Lennard (credited as Myrtland La Varre)
- Scotty Devlin as Reilly's Chauffeur
- John Dipse as Fighter in Preliminary Bout
- Eddie Garvey (unidentified role)
- Sailor Gibbs as Fighter at Training Camp
- Patsy Haley as Referee
- Joe Humphries as Ring Announcer
- Ted "Kid" Lewis as Fighter at Training Camp (credited as Kid Lewis)
- Tommy McFadden (unidentified role)
- Graham McNamee as Radio Reporter
- Kid McPartland as Timekeeper
- Jack Perry as Fighter at Training Camp
- Billy Vidabeck as Fighter at Training camp
- George Ward as Fighter in Preliminary Bout
- John Burdette as Minor role

== Production ==
Film historian Ruth Anne Dwyer notes that the movie sequences dealing with training were filmed on location at the Lake Placid, New York, the traditional venue for professional training camps. Actual boxing rings were built on which to film the bouts. Dwyer adds “St. Clair paid great attention to details of costuming and the sets in an effort to impart as much authentic detail as possible.” Due to his keen interest in boxing, as well as the freedom Paramount provided him in casting Knockout Reilly, St. Clair assembled numerous figures from professional boxing to appear in cameo roles.

Among these are Graham MacNamee, who covered the 1927 broadcast of Dempsey-Tunney heavyweight match, announcer Joe Humphreys appears as himself covering the staged fight between Dix and Renault, Patsy Haley as referee, trainer Jimmy DeForrest (who trained Jack Dempsey), boxer Kid McPartland, as timekeeper, former featherweight Larry McGrath, bantam-weight champ Ted "Kid" Lewis, light heavyweights Billy Vidabeck and Jack Perry, and prizefighter Scotty Devlin, who plays Dix’s chauffeur in the film.

== See also ==
- List of boxing films
