= Starfruit (album) =

Studio album by stephaniesǐd
- Released: October 18, 2011
- Genre: Indie pop
- Length: 53:20
- Label: Nine Mile
- Producer: Stephanie Morgan

Stephaniesǐd chronology
Warm People (2009)	Starfruit (2011)	Excavator (2015)

starfruit is the fourth studio album from the American pop group stephaniesǐd.

== Content ==
The fourteen-track album was released digitally and on compact disc with Nine Mile Records, on October 18, 2011. It was produced and engineered by Stephanie Morgan in her basement studio, mixed by Jeff Knor at Collapseable Studios in Asheville, North Carolina, and mastered by Seva at Soundcurrent Studios in Knoxville, Tennessee. The cover art is by Jenny Greer at Sound Mind Media. Five or six of the songs of starfruit arose from an art project assignment she shared with friends. Morgan explains that "we gave each other assignments every week[,] writing a song in a particular tempo or rhythm, or one inspired by a movie. And it made us do things we might not normally do." Conceptually, Morgan describes the album as a "universe [that] leapt out of the grayness", adding "track by track, a mouthwatering other-world materialized, hovering a few feet above some cheap microphones, a laptop and the pit of the stormy sea."

The album is described as "lush, sophisticated pop, hip-hop [with] jazzy atmospherics." It draws comparison to the music of Massive Attack, Tune-Yards, and Janet Jackson. The CD release party for starfruit was held at the Lexington Avenue Arts & Fun Festival, on September 3, 2011, where they performed on the Arts2People electric stage. The album was digitally reissued with Mint 400 Records, in 2015.

== Reception ==
A review by Ryan Snyder in Yes! Weekly says the album is "both a tribute to and a product of the most impulsive part of the psychic apparatus, a romantic notion in theory, but rarely consonant in praxis." He commends their rendition of Dream Academy's "Life in a Northern Town", saying that it is an "infectious and uplifting recitation of the once carefree middle-class lifestyle, and it's a rarity in pop music where tasteful jazz drums can push a song from good to great", however notes the "overdubbed vocal tracks and misplaced outbursts obscure and complicate Morgan's dynamic range and the band's driving rhythm on "Life of Pi.""

A The Daily Times reviewer says, "with vocals as smoky and sultry as a glass of red wine[,] starfruit drips with a complex weave of layers and studio bells and whistles that give the album a lush, expansive sound." San Antonio Express-News says starfruit "takes Morgan's precious confessional talents and mashes them with a ghostly, childlike quality, amplified by toy pianos and bell-like interludes that would feel at home at a rave, alt-rock club or mix-tape party."

== Track listing ==
No.	Title	Length
1.	"closer"	3:46
2.	"life of pi"	2:57
3.	"cadiz"	3:03
4.	"i like it"	4:40
5.	"cinematic"	3:15
6.	"doggy song"	5:17
7.	"life in a northern town"	4:59
8.	"starf***er"	3:01
9.	"shlamiel"	2:56
10.	"i like it too"	3:39
11.	"house of many colors"	4:20
12.	"multiply"	3:19
13.	"so low"	6:14
14.	"a hope"	1:55
Total length:		53:20

== Personnel ==
- Stephanie Morgan – vocals, guitar and synths
- Chuck Lichtenberger – piano, rhodes, synths and backing vocals on "so low"
- Tim Haney – drums

Additional musicians

- Susanne Hackett – additional vocals on "cinematic"
- Sarah Hurd – violin orchestra
- Jonathan Pearlman – guitar
- Justin Ray – flugelhorn and trumpet
- Jon Reid – marimba, rhodes, melodica, ukulele and bass on "house of many colors"
- Matthew Richmond – vibraphone, bells and percussion
- Jacob Rodriguez – baritone and tenor sax, bass clarinet and hand claps
