= You Can't Go Home Again =

1940 novel by Thomas Wolfe

- First edition cover
- Editor: Edward Aswell (edited and compiled work from writings of Wolfe, published posthumously)
- Author: Thomas Wolfe
- Genre: Autobiographical fiction, Romance
- Published: September 18, 1940 (Harper & Row)
- Pages: 743
- OCLC: 964311

You Can't Go Home Again is a novel by Thomas Wolfe, published posthumously on September 18, 1940. The novel was extracted by Edward Aswell, Wolfe's editor, from the contents of his vast unpublished manuscript The October Fair. It is a sequel to The Web and the Rock, which, along with the collection The Hills Beyond, was extracted from the same manuscript.

The novel tells the story of George Webber, a fledgling author, who writes a book that makes frequent references to his home town of Libya Hill which was actually Asheville, North Carolina. The book is a national success but residents of the town, being unhappy with what they view as Webber's distorted depiction of them, send the author menacing letters and death threats.

Wolfe, as in many of his other novels, explores the changing American society of the 1920s/30s, including the stock market crash, the illusion of prosperity, and the unfair passing of time which prevents Webber ever being able to return "home again". In parallel to Wolfe's relationship with the United States, the novel details his disillusionment with Germany during the rise of Nazism. Wolfe scholar Jon Dawson argues that the two themes are connected most firmly by Wolfe's critique of capitalism and comparison between the rise of capitalist enterprise in the United States in the 1920s and the rise of fascism in Germany during the same period.

The artist Alexander Calder appears, fictionalized as "Piggy Logan".

== Plot summary ==
George Webber has written a successful novel about his family and hometown. When he returns to that town, he is shaken by the force of outrage and hatred that greets him. Family and lifelong friends feel naked and exposed by what they have seen in his books, and their fury drives him from his home.

An outcast, George Webber begins a search for his own identity. It takes him to New York and a hectic social whirl; to Paris with an uninhibited group of expatriates; to Berlin, lying cold and sinister under Hitler's shadow. The journey comes full circle when Webber returns to America and rediscovers it with love, sorrow, and hope.

== Title ==
Wolfe took the title from a conversation with the writer Ella Winter, who remarked to Wolfe: "Don't you know you can't go home again?" Wolfe then asked Winter for permission to use the phrase as the title of his book.

The title is reinforced in the denouement of the novel in which Webber realizes: "You can't go back home to your family, back home to your childhood ... back home to a young man's dreams of glory and of fame ... back home to places in the country, back home to the old forms and systems of things which once seemed everlasting, but which are changing all the time – back home to the escapes of Time and Memory." (Ellipses in original)
