= Edward Aswell =

American editor

Aswell in 1926

Edward Campbell Aswell (October 9, 1900 – November 5, 1958) was a 20th-century American editor. He was Thomas Wolfe's last editor and edited Wolfe's three posthumous books. This required considerable editorial work as the manuscripts were not in publishable form at Wolfe's death, but how much credit for the resulting three books devolves to Wolfe, and how much to Aswell, remains a subject of dispute.

Aswell was graduated from Harvard University in 1926 and worked as an assistant editor for The Atlantic Monthly and then Harper & Brothers Publishers, where he eventually became editor-in-chief. Aswell persuaded the novelist Thomas Wolfe to sign with Harper & Brothers, and Wolfe turned over his manuscripts to the publisher.

After Wolfe’s death in September 1938, Aswell began editing the manuscripts. The initial development of this was Wolfe's first posthumous novel, The Web and the Rock, published a year later. Two years later You Can't Go Home Again and the short story collection The Hills Beyond were published, also edited by Aswell.

Aswell later moved to McGraw-Hill and then to Doubleday & Company, becoming a senior editor. In 1947 Aswell gained significant control over the Thomas Wolfe estate, succeeding Maxwell Perkins. The estate's collection of documents included Wolfe's correspondence. Aswell curated this correspondence and contributed "An Introduction to Thomas Wolfe" for the abridged Look Homeward, Angel published by the New American Library.

Aswell's correspondence with Elizabeth Nowell, Thomas Wolfe's literary agent, was collected in the 1988 book In the Shadow of the Giant.

Aswell appears briefly as a character called "the Weasel" in Sophie's Choice, a novel by William Styron, who worked for McGraw-Hill during Aswell's tenure there and wrote about his experiences in the novel.
