= Robert Morgan (writer) =

American writer

- Born: 1944 (age 81–82)
- Education: North Carolina State University; University of North Carolina at Chapel Hill; University of North Carolina Greensboro (MFA)
- Occupations: Short story writer; poet; novelist
- Website: www.robert-morgan.com

Robert Morgan (born 1944) is an American poet, short story writer, and novelist.

== Life ==
He studied at North Carolina State University as an engineering and mathematics major, transferred to the University of North Carolina at Chapel Hill as an English major, graduating in 1965, and completed an MFA degree at the University of North Carolina Greensboro in 1968.

He has taught at Cornell University since 1971, and was appointed Professor of English in 1984.

== Awards ==
- Academy Award in Literature by the American Academy of Arts and Letters
- 2008 Thomas Wolfe Prize
- 2012 SIBA Book Award (nonfiction) for Lions of the West.
- 2013 William "Singing Billy" Walker Award for Lifetime Achievement in Southern Letters.

== Works ==
=== Collections ===
- Zirconia Poems. Northwood Narrows, New Hampshire: Lillabulero Press, 1969.
- The Voice in the Crosshairs. Ithaca, New York: Angelfish Press. 1971.
- Red Owl. New York: Norton, 1972.
- Land Diving. Baton Rouge: Louisiana State University Press. 1976. ISBN 978-0-8071-0199-5.
- Trunk & Thicket. Fort Collins, Colorado: L’Epervier Press, 1978.
- Groundwork. Frankfort, Kentucky: Gnomon Press, 1979.
- Bronze Age. Emory, Virginia: Iron Mountain Press, 1981.
- At the Edge of the Orchard Country. Middletown, Connecticut: Wesleyan University Press, 1987.
- Sigodlin. Middletown, Connecticut: Wesleyan University Press. 1990.
- Saints on islands: poems. Indigo. 1991. ISBN 978-0-9513614-3-6.
- Green River: New and Selected Poems. Hanover, New Hampshire: University Press of New England, 1991.
- Wild Peavines: New Poems. Frankfort, Kentucky: Gnomon Press, 1996.
- Topsoil Road: Poems. Baton Rouge: Louisiana State University Press. 2000. ISBN 978-0-8071-2613-4.
- Morgan, Robert (2004). The Strange Attractor: New and Selected Poems. Baton Rouge: Louisiana State University Press. ISBN 978-0-8071-2951-7.
- Terroir. New York: Penguin Books. 2011. ISBN 978-0-14-312019-3.
- Dark Energy. New York: Penguin Books. 2015. ISBN 978-0-14-312806-9.

=== Individual poems ===
- ""OPTION", The Atlantic, October 1997
- ""Wind From a Waterfall", The Atlantic, September 1999
- ""Girdling", The Atlantic, December 1997
- ""Holy Cussing", Southern Poetry Review, Vol. 43, No. 1, 2004
- "Fern glade", The Atlantic, December 2009

=== Short fiction ===
==== Collections ====
- The Blue Valleys: A Collection of Stories. Atlanta, Georgia: Peachtree Publishers. 1989. ISBN 978-0-7432-0422-4.
- The Mountains Won’t Remember Us and Other Stories. Atlanta, Georgia: Peachtree Publishers, 1992.
- The Hinterlands: A Mountain Tale in Three Parts. Chapel Hill, North Carolina: Algonquin. 1994. ISBN 978-0-89587-178-7.
- The Balm of Gilead Tree and Other Stories. Frankfort, Kentucky: Gnomon Press. 1999. ISBN 978-0-917788-73-4.

==== Stories ====
"The Distant Blue Hills", The Southern Review

=== Novels ===
- The Truest Pleasure. Chapel Hill, North Carolina: Algonquin Books. 1995. ISBN 978-1-56512-105-8.
- Gap Creek. Chapel Hill, North Carolina: Algonquin Books. 1999. ISBN 978-0-7432-0363-0.
- This Rock. Chapel Hill, North Carolina: Algonquin Books. 2001. ISBN 978-1-56512-303-8.
- Brave Enemies: A Novel of the American Revolution. Chapel Hill, North Carolina: Algonquin Books. 2003. ISBN 978-1-56512-356-4.
- The Road from Gap Creek. Chapel Hill, North Carolina: Algonquin Books. 2013. ISBN 978-1-61620-161-6.
- Chasing the North Star. Chapel Hill, North Carolina: Algonquin Books. 2016. ISBN 978-1-56512-627-5.

=== Non-fiction ===
- Good Measure: Essays, Interviews and Notes on Poetry. Baton Rouge: Louisiana State University Press, 1993.
- Boone: A Biography, Algonquin Books of Chapel Hill, 2007, ISBN 978-1-56512-615-2
- Lions of the West - Heroes and Villains of the Westward Expansion, Shannon Ravenel Books, 2011, ISBN 978-1-56512-626-8
