= 44 Cygni =

Star and surrounding nebula

- Location of 44 Cygni (circled)

Observation data Epoch 2000.0 Equinox 2000.0
| Constellation | Cygnus |
- A
| Right ascension | 20^{h} 30^{m} 59.23^{s} |
| Declination | +36° 56′ 09.0″ |
- Apparent magnitude (V): 6.22
- B
| Right ascension | 20^{h} 30^{m} 59.30^{s} |
| Declination | +36° 56′ 07.0″ |
- Apparent magnitude (V): 10.07

Characteristics
- Spectral type: F5Ib

Astrometry
| Radial velocity (R_{v}) | −19.91±0.14 km/s |
| Proper motion (μ) | RA: −0.623 mas/yr Dec.: −3.894 mas/yr |
| Parallax (π) | 0.7690±0.0215 mas |
| Distance | 4,200 ± 100 ly (1,300 ± 40 pc) |
| Absolute magnitude (M_{V}) | −6.51 |

Details

A
| Mass | 11.2 M_{☉} |
| Radius | 74 R_{☉} |
| Luminosity | 9,151 L_{☉} |
| Surface gravity (log g) | 1.44 cgs |
| Temperature | 6,554 K |
| Rotational velocity (v sin i) | 6.5 km/s |
| Age | 18 Myr |

B
| Mass | 1.6 M_{☉} |
| Surface gravity (log g) | 1.05 cgs |
| Temperature | 4,019 K |

Other designations
- 44 Cyg, HD 195593, HIP 101214, WDS J20310+3656
- A: HR 7847, IRAS 20290+3646, 2MASS J20305922+3656091, WISE J203059.22+365609.1
- B: TYC 2697-1634-2

Database references
| SIMBAD | data |
- B

44 Cygni is a supergiant star in the constellation Cygnus. It is surrounded by the reflection nebula vdB 133. The nebula Sh 2-106 is found less than a degree to the northwest.

44 Cygni is the primary component of the double star AC 18. Its companion, AC 18 B, has a magnitude of 9.59 compared with 44 Cygni's magnitude of 6.2. They are visually separated by 2", making it challenging, but not impossible, to view optically.

== vdB 133 ==
vdB 133 (LBN 218) is the reflection nebula surrounding 44 Cygni. It is notable for being a much more white color than the blue of most reflection nebulae. The nebula has an apparent size of 12'. It is possible the reflection nebula is located on the far side of 44 Cygni as viewed from Earth, since the white light seen from the star differs from the more blue color expected from the scattering of light through a nebula.
