= Gap Creek =

1999 American novel

- Author: Robert Morgan
- Language: English
- Genre: Fiction
- Publisher: Algonquin Books of Chapel Hill
- Publication date: 1999 (1st edition)
- Publication place: United States
- Media type: Print (hardcover)
- Pages: 326 pp (hardcover edition)
- ISBN: 1-56512-242-9
- Dewey Decimal: 813/.54 21
- LC Class: PS3563.O87147 G36 1999
- Preceded by: 41488832

Gap Creek (1999, ISBN 1-56512-242-9) is a novel by American writer Robert Morgan, that was chosen as an Oprah's Book Club selection in January 2000. Gap Creek is a sequel to Morgan's previous novel, The Truest Pleasure. Gap Creek is a story about a strong young woman trying to make sense of the events in her life; death, marriage and parenthood don't dampen her spirits.

The novel has been translated into French, Turkish, and German.

== Plot summary ==
Gap Creek's main character is a young girl, Julie, who does everything she possibly can to help her family and her new husband, Hank. Julie works hard to help her family when they need it, some even say she works as "hard as a man." Her family depends on her to milk the cows, slaughter the hogs, and nurse the dying. As a teenager, Julie witness her young little brother die in her arms from a seizure, a year later he father dies from chest consumption. After the death of the two men her life, 17-year-old Julie marries Hank Richards and moves to Gap Creek in South Carolina where they meet Mr. Pendergast and set up an arrangement so they can live there. Julie has to do the laundry and the housekeeping while Hank works outside of the house. Towards the end of the 19th century, the couple experiences the most complicated scenarios they could have ever imagined through floods, fires, drunks and busybodies who wander around their house and neighborhood. While pregnant, Julie finally sees the true side of Hank, having lost his job, she saw how immature he was and how hot-tempered he was. When the couple was going through a tough time, being short on money and all, Julie goes into labor early giving birth to a premature baby girl who she named Delia. A couple of days later, Delia passes away, leaving Julie depressed and lonely. The couple pulls through towards the end with the help of the church and their religion.

== Reception ==
Gap Creek was #4 in the best selling Fiction Books list in the New York Times. It took Morgan four months to write the first draft of Gap Creek, he wanted to make sure he grasped the voice of Julie Harmon and make it seem like the type of character she is, after completing the first draft, it took a year for it to be published. Gap Creek sold over 2 million copies, with numerous of books selling in other countries. In August 2013, Morgan plans to finish the sequel with "The Road From Gap Creek" but instead of it being told through Julie, it will be told by Annie, Julie's daughter.

Gap Creek has been praised by several publications including the American Way Magazine, The New York Times, The Orlando Sentinel, The Raleigh News and Observer, People Magazine, Publishers Weekly, and many more. Wilmington (NC) Star News says that Gap Creek had an "unforgettable voice." "The narrative immerses the reader in a time, early in this century, and place when five dollars was a fortune, home-made jam a lifesaving gift and the simple act of going to church a step toward survival." says Publishers Weekly. Reviews say that critics are comparing Gap Creek to Charles Frasiers "Cold Mountain" while, Gap creek is a chambers work and Cold Mountain is epic.
