= Winnecke Catalogue of Double Stars =

Catalogue of double stars published in 1869

Winnecke Catalogue of Double Stars is a list of seven "new" double stars published by German astronomer August Winnecke in Astronomische Nachrichten in 1869. Winnecke later noted that three of the double stars he catalogued had been discovered earlier (30 Eridani, Messier 40, and 44 Cygni). The stars are sometimes given Winnecke designations (e.g. Winnecke 4), and sometimes abbreviated to WNC.

WNC #	Other Names	Constellation	Component Magnitudes	Spectral Types	Right Ascension	Declination
1		Pisces	9.9 / 10.4	G5 / ?	00^{h} 58^{m} 01^{s}	+09° 16.7′
2	30 Eridani	Eridanus	5.4 / 10.6	B8V / F4V	03^{h} 52^{m} 42^{s}	−05° 21.7′
3		Orion	6.6 / 8.0 / 8.1	F7V / F8V / F8V	05^{h} 23^{m} 51^{s}	00° 52.0′
4	M40	Ursa Major	9.6 / 10.1	G0 / F8	12^{h} 22^{m} 16^{s}	58° 5.0′
5		Virgo	9.6	G0	13^{h} 45^{m} 33^{s}	−03° 1.0′
6	44 Cygni	Cygnus	6.2	F5Iab	20^{h} 31^{m} 00^{s}	36° 56.2′
7		Pegasus	8.6	F8	23^{h} 32^{m} 33^{s}	31° 26.8′
