= Winnecke 4 =

Optical double star in the constellation Ursa Major

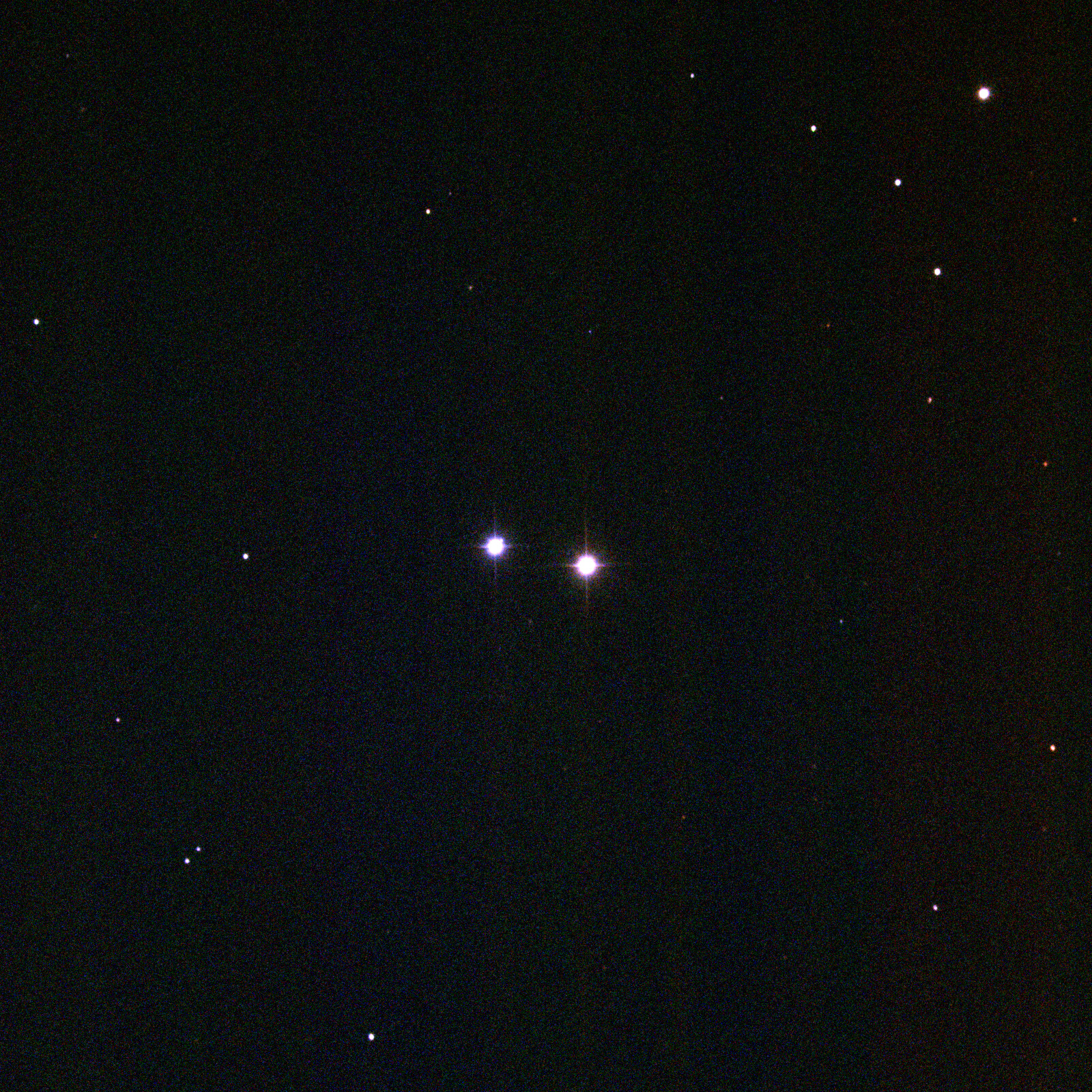
- Winnecke 4 double star

Observation data Epoch J2000.0 Equinox ICRS
- Constellation: Ursa Major
- A
- Right ascension: 12^{h} 22^{m} 12.5272^{s}
- Declination: +58° 4′ 58.549″
- Apparent magnitude (V): 9.64
- B
- Right ascension: 12^{h} 22^{m} 18.9992^{s}
- Declination: +58° 5′ 10.366″
- Apparent magnitude (V): 10.11

Characteristics

A
- Evolutionary stage: red giant branch
- Spectral type: K0 III

B
- Evolutionary stage: main sequence
- Spectral type: G0 V

Astrometry

A
Parallax (π)	3.2191±0.0118 mas
Distance	1,013 ± 4 ly (311 ± 1 pc)
Absolute magnitude (M_{V})	+0.88

B
Parallax (π)	6.9328±0.0155 mas
Distance	470 ± 1 ly (144.2 ± 0.3 pc)
Absolute magnitude (M_{V})	+4.0

Details

A
Mass	1.15 M_{☉}
Radius	4.48 R_{☉}
Luminosity	13 L_{☉}
Surface gravity (log g)	3.16 cgs
Temperature	4,957 K
Metallicity [Fe/H]	−0.164 dex
Age	4.1 Gyr

B
Mass	1.00 M_{☉}
Radius	1.1 R_{☉}
Luminosity	1.56 L_{☉}
Surface gravity (log g)	4.36 cgs
Temperature	6,146 K
Metallicity [Fe/H]	−0.26 dex

Other designations
- M40, WNC 4, BD+56 1372, CCDM 12223+5805, WDS J12222+5805
- A: HD 238107, SAO 28353
- B: HD 238108, SAO 28355

Database references
SIMBAD	data
- A
- B

Winnecke 4 (also known as Messier 40 or WNC 4) is an optical double star consisting of two unrelated stars in a northerly zone of the sky, Ursa Major.

The pair were discovered by Charles Messier in 1764 while he was searching for a nebula that had been reported in the area by Johannes Hevelius. Not seeing any nebulae, Messier catalogued this apparent pair instead. In reality, Hevelius (who had made naked eye observations of the sky) had spotted 74 and 75 Ursae Majoris, an unrelated pair of 5th-6th magnitude stars separated by 22 arcminutes, a degree to the East of Winnecke 4, and whose faintness and close separation makes them potentially appear as a single nebulous star to the unaided eye. It is unclear why Messier determined this would correspond to a pair of 9-10th magnitude stars, as Winnecke 4 is far fainter than the naked eye can see even in ideal conditions, although he may have been attempting to catalog it for the sake of pointing out Hevelius's error. The pair were rediscovered by Friedrich August Theodor Winnecke in 1863, and included in the Winnecke Catalogue of Double Stars as number 4. Burnham calls M40 "one of the few real mistakes in the Messier catalog," faulting Messier for including it when all he saw was a double star, not a nebula of any sort.

In 1991 the separation between the components was measured at 51.7″, an increase since 1764. Data gathered by astronomers Brian Skiff (2001) and Richard L. Nugent (2002) strongly suggested the subject was merely an optical double star rather than a physically connected (binary) system. The A star that seems the brighter is over twice as far as B. Parallax measurements from the Gaia satellite show the two stars, HD 238107 and HD 238108, are at distances of 311 ± 1 parsec (1,013 ± 4 light-years) and 144.2 ± 0.3 parsecs (470 ± 1 light-year) respectively. HD 238108 is itself a genuine binary star, with an 18th magnitude white dwarf companion 5 arcseconds away and a parallax distance of 146.8 ± 2.3 parsecs (479 ± 8 light-years).

== See also ==
- List of Messier objects
