= Of Time and the River =

1935 novel by Thomas Wolfe

- First edition of Of Time and the River
- Author: Thomas Wolfe
- Language: English
- Genre: Bildungsroman, Southern Gothic
- Publisher: Charles Scribner's Sons
- Publication date: 1935
- Publication place: United States
- Media type: Print (hardcover)

Of Time and the River (subtitled A Legend of Man's Hunger in his Youth) is a 1935 novel by American author Thomas Wolfe. It is a fictionalized autobiography, using the name Eugene Gant for Wolfe's, detailing the protagonist's early and mid-20s, during which time the character attends Harvard University, moves to New York City, where he teaches English at a university, and travels overseas with the character Francis Starwick. Francis Starwick was based on Wolfe's friend, playwright Kenneth Raisbeck. The novel was published by Scribners and edited by Maxwell Perkins. According to Publishers Weekly, it was the third-best selling work of fiction in 1935.

The Good Child's River was meant to be part of Of Time and the River but most of it was never typed up from the three handwritten ledgers which Suzanne Stutman uncovered in the William B. Wisdom Thomas Wolfe Collection of Harvard's Houghton Library manuscript collection. Unlike Wolfe's major novels, The Good Child's River includes neither Eugene Gant nor George Webber, Wolfe's fictional counterparts, but instead focuses on Webber's lover, Esther Jack (based on Aline Bernstein). Bernstein made many notes about her life for Wolfe, who fashioned the material into The Good Child's River.

A Howard Rodman adaptation of this story was presented in the Hallmark Hall of Fame on 4 October 1953, starring Thomas Mitchell as William Oliver Gant. The English composer John McCabe's Fourth Symphony is subtitled Of Time and the River.

A fictionalised process of editing the original manuscript Of Time and the River was featured in the 2016 film Genius that starred Jude Law as Thomas Wolfe.

== Excerpt ==
"At that instant he saw, in one blaze of light, an image of unutterable conviction, the reason why the artist works and lives and has his being—the reward he seeks—the only reward he really cares about, without which there is nothing. It is to snare the spirits of mankind in nets of magic, to make his life prevail through his creation, to wreak the vision of his life, the rude and painful substance of his own experience, into the congruence of blazing and enchanted images that are themselves the core of life, the essential pattern whence all other things proceed, the kernel of eternity."
