= WNC (magazine) =

WNC magazine
- Editor: Allison Sherman
- Categories: Culture and lifestyle
- Frequency: Four times a year
- Founded: 2007
- Company: Gulfstream Communications
- Country: USA
- Based in: Western North Carolina
- Language: English
- Website: www.wncmagazine.com

WNC magazine is a regional lifestyle magazine published by Gulfstream Communications in Western North Carolina from which it takes its name. The magazine debuted in 2007 and is a four times-a-year publication.

Most issues offer articles on arts, crafts, architecture, history and foodways of Western North Carolina. Each issue includes features on current topics facing residents and profiles on intriguing locals with regular departments on homes, weekend escapes, a calendar of regional events and a comprehensive dining guide.

WNC is unique to the region in that it covers all twenty-three counties normally associated with Western North Carolina. There is also a cover-price as opposed to the many free publications available in the region.
