= Bele Chere =

Festival in North Carolina, US (1979–2013)

- Genre: Music and arts street festival
- Dates: Last weekend in July
- Location: Asheville, North Carolina
- Years active: 1979–2013
- Founders: City of Asheville
- Attendance: 350,000+
- Website: (archived)

Bele Chere was an annual music and arts street festival held in downtown Asheville, North Carolina. The festival was previously held annually on the last weekend in July beginning in 1979. It was the largest free festival in the Southeastern United States, attracting over 350,000 people.

The festival consisted of six stages scattered on various street corners in Asheville. A designated area called Arts Park typically featured several dozen regional artists and their work. Displayed art covered a variety of media types including painting, photography, pottery and jewelry. A variety of music genres were represented at the festival, including country, blues, folk, mountain, rock and jazz with both local and nationally known musicians represented.

== Gallery ==
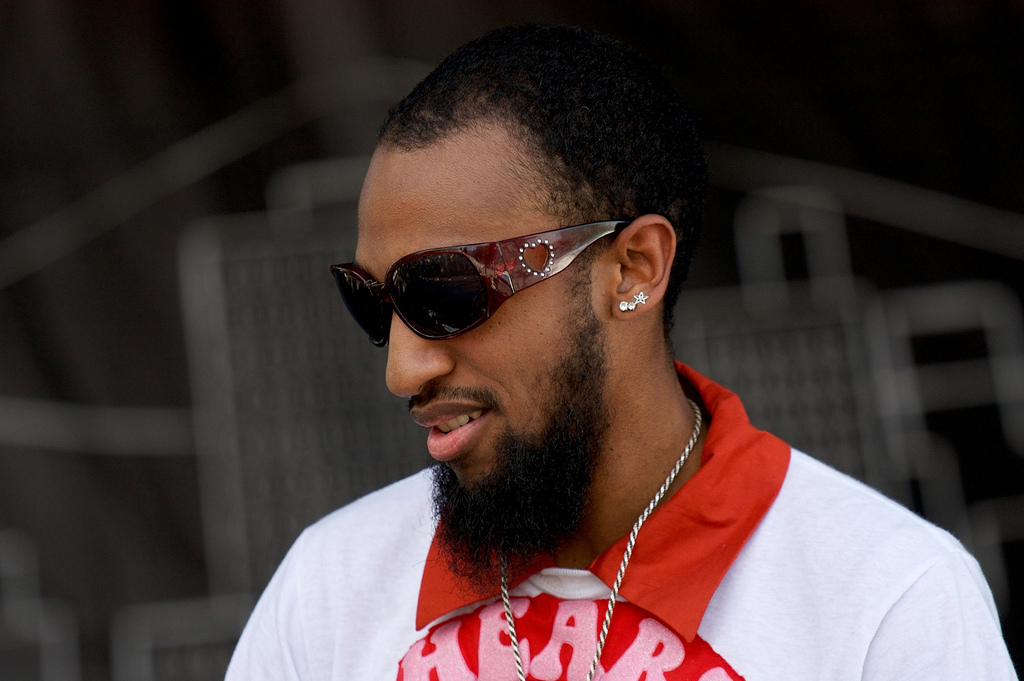
Jonathan Scales at Béle Chére on July 23, 2010

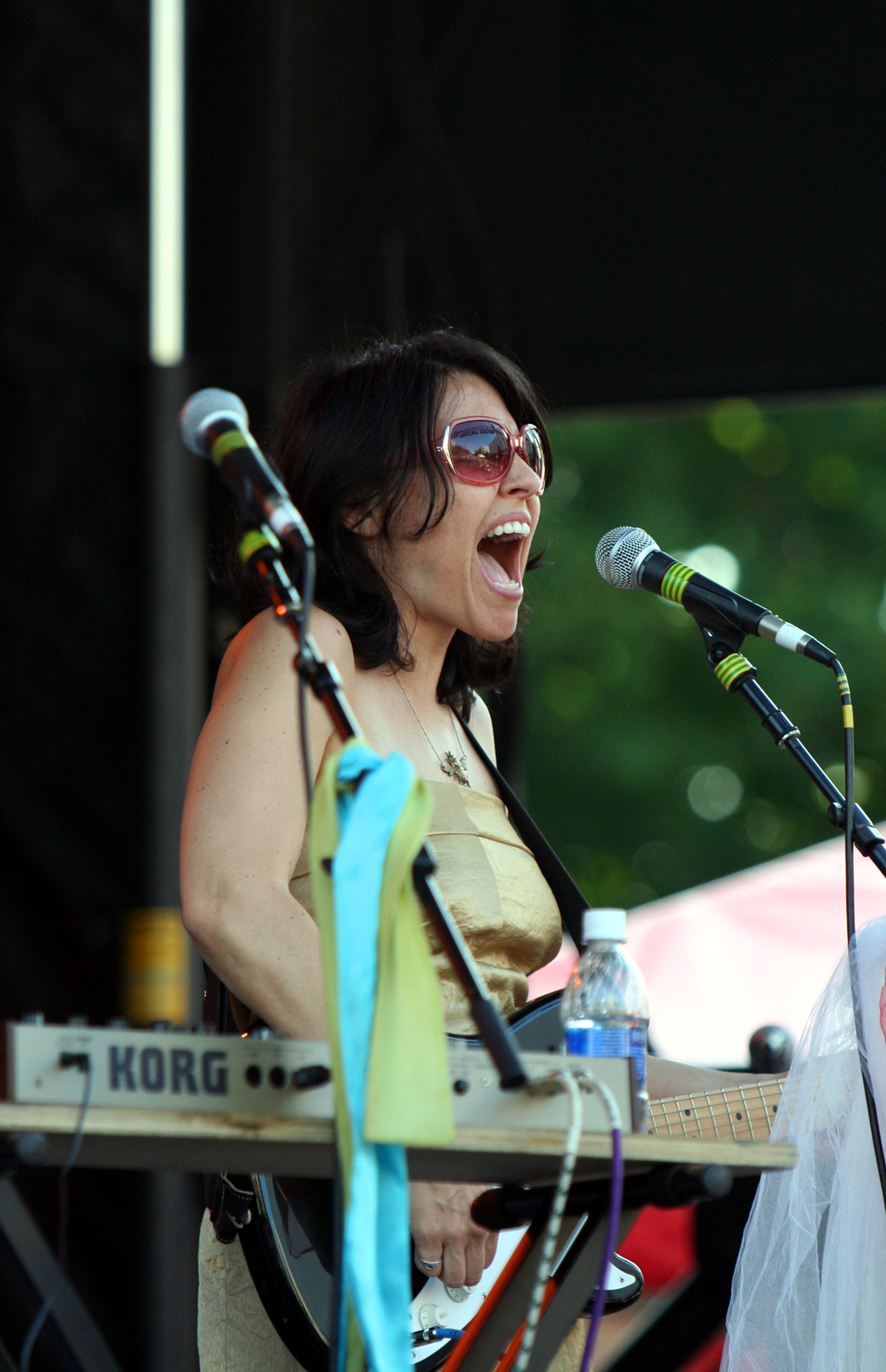
Stephanie Morgan at Bele Chere 2009

== Economic impact ==
In 1979, the festival was sponsored by the Asheville Revitalization Commission Bele Chere, pronounced "bell share", is a Scottish adaptation of a French phrase meaning "beautiful living". The festival was created to address a severe decline in tourism, a decline in shopping downtown, a general feeling of hard economic times. By 2007, the festival's 28th year, it had become one of the Southeast's top summer events.

In later years, the area had recovered and businesses in the festival's downtown area began to see negative financial impacts from the event. A 2007 survey of businesses in downtown Asheville indicated that for more than 80% of respondents, the festival was bad for business, resulting in significant revenue declines during the days on which it was held. Two factors contributing to this were the large number of non-local vendors arriving for the event and the rise in vandalism during the festival. Despite these impacts, more than half of respondents felt that if the festival were to continue after 2007, it should remain in the same location. The event was revenue neutral for the local government.

On March 12, 2013, City Council discussed ending the festival. Lauren Bradley, the city's director of finance and management services, told Council that holding Bele Chere in 2013 but ending financial support in 2014 would save the city $200,000 the following fiscal year.

The 2013 festival was Bele Chere's 35th and last edition. With the city facing budget shortfalls, City Council decided to end funding Bele Chere.

== See also ==
- List of festivals in the United States
- List of historic rock festivals
- Arts festival
- Free festival
