= Friedrich August Theodor Winnecke =

German astronomer (1835–1897)

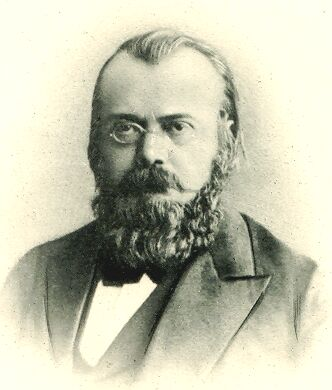
Friedrich August Theodor Winnecke

Friedrich August Theodor Winnecke (5 February 1835 in Groß-Heere, near Hannover – 3 December 1897 in Bonn) was a German astronomer.

Winnecke worked at Pulkovo Observatory near Saint Petersburg from 1858 to 1865, but returned to Germany and served as professor of astronomy in Strasbourg from 1872 to 1881.

He discovered or co-discovered a large number of comets, including the periodic comet 7P/Pons-Winnecke and the comet once known as "Pons-Coggia-Winnecke-Forbes" but later renamed to 27P/Crommelin after Andrew Crommelin, who computed its orbit.

Winnecke also compiled a list of double stars, the Winnecke Catalogue of Double Stars, in 1869. He also found a number of nebulae.

The asteroid 207 Hedda, discovered by Johann Palisa in 1879, was named after Winnecke's wife Hedwig. In 2010 an asteroid discovered on 2002 Apr. 4 by M. Meyer (215423) Winnecke was named after Winnecke himself.
