= Spirit of Atlanta Drum and Bugle Corps =

Junior drum and bugle corps based in Atlanta, Georgia

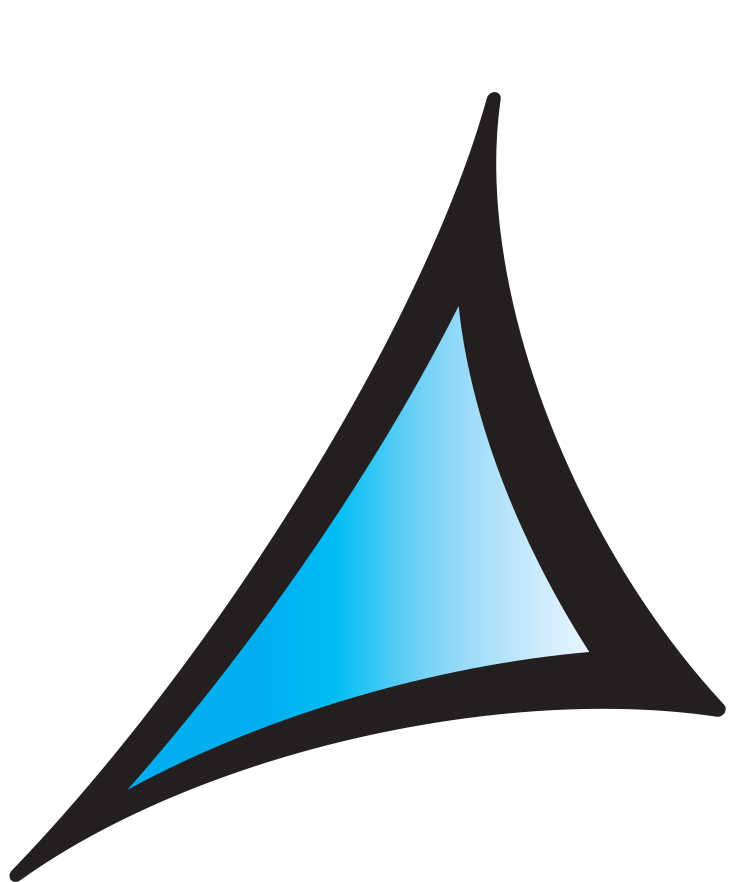
- Location: Atlanta, Georgia
- Division: World Class
- Founded: 1976
- Director: Chris Moore
- Website: spiritofatlanta.org

Spirit of Atlanta Drum and Bugle Corps is a World Class competitive junior drum and bugle corps. Based in Atlanta, Georgia, Spirit of Atlanta is a member corps of Drum Corps International (DCI).

== History ==
=== 1970s ===
Spirit of Atlanta was founded by corps director Freddy Martin, then Director of Bands at South Cobb High School. Initially, a program with no particular musical style was worked up, and Spirit of Atlanta was introduced to the drum corps public at contests in at least nine states in the South and Midwest. At the 1977 DCI World Championships in Denver, Spirit finished twenty-third of forty-five corps.

After finishing twenty-third, two new caption heads were hired: brass head Jim Ott and percussion head Tom Float. With these two hires,(along With Dave Bandy writing the drill, Russell Stanton teaching marching technique and cleaning, Patty Williams teaching flags and Margaret Ott teaching rifles) the core instructional group was in place. Adopting a style that has been referred to as "Southern Jazz", Spirit stunned the drum corps world in 1978, vaulting into eighth place at DCI Prelims in Denver; then at Finals, the corps rose even higher, finishing in sixth place and losing the High Brass title to the Phantom Regiment by half of a tenth of a point. Spirit moved up into a fourth-place finish at DCI in Birmingham, Alabama, in 1979, featuring the song that would become the corps' trademark tune, "Georgia on my Mind."

=== 1980s ===
While the corps was on tour in 1980, one of their vans was in a traffic accident on Interstate 55 near Grenada, Mississippi. This led to the death of brass arranger and caption head Jim Ott. The high brass trophy awarded at the end of each Drum Corps International season is named in his honor.

Prior to the 1981 season, the corps lost its corporate sponsorship from WXIA. Financial adjustments were made and the corps continued on. Following the loss of Jim Ott in the 1980 season new staff members were needed to fill the vacancies. For the summer of 1981, the drill designer was Steve Moore; horn caption heads included Gary Markham and Joel Schultz. Visual Designers were Freddy Martin and John Armstrong. The guard instructors brought in the varied talents of Julie Gilbert of the Crossmen, Cindy Anderson of the Guardsmen, and Robert S. Robinson of Jacksonville State University and Chapter V Winter Guard. Tom Float remained percussion caption head and Mike Back, who was a percussion instructor in 1980 returned to the staff. Spirit of Atlanta repeated the musical program of the 1980 season in 1981, with the exception of the concert number, hoping for higher levels of competitive success. This was not to be the case, as the corps finished in ninth place in 1981. The percussion was the highest scoring caption for the year, but Tom Float departed at the end of the 1981 season. At the end of 1982, the corps finished 12th place with the guard ranked 11th in their caption at DCI finals.

In 1983, the corps rallied to a seventh-place finish behind the new visual staff of Sal Salas, Scott Chandler and Tam Easterwood along with longtime marching instructor Brad Carraway.

The 1985 corps saw Tam Easterwood and Scott Chandler's colorguard win the guard trophy, a feat they would repeat in 1987.

In 1986, the tenth competitive season of the corps, the "throwback" show of Southern blues, jazz and gospel earned them a sixth-place finish and an all-time high score for Spirit of Atlanta of 94.1 at the DCI Championships.

In 1988, a decision was made to turn away from jazz and blues to the classical idiom. Although the corps' competitive placement improved from tenth to ninth place and scored in the 92's just weeks prior to finals, the classical show based on Stravinsky's "Petrushka" was panned by drum corps fans used to the high-powered brass and exciting shows for which Spirit had become known.

In 1989, Spirit dropped from finals for the first time since 1978.

=== 1990s ===
In 1990, Spirit of Atlanta regained Finalist status, From 1991 to 1993, the corps maintained semi-finalist status. After the 1993 season, Bill Duquette took over from Freddy Martin due to significant organizational and financial challenges, and the corps went inactive in 1994.

The corps returned to the field in 1995, and began rebuilding. In the following seasons, the corps reached 23rd place in 1996, 17th place in 1997, 14th place in 1998, and 16th place in 1999. In 1997, the corps changed uniforms to a navy blue top with cream pants.

=== 2000s ===
In 2000, while the corps was rehearsing at JSU just prior to the start of tour, the corps director, Bill Duquette, attempted to fold the drum corps. Due to a very strong response by corps parents, alumni, staff and other members of the drum corps community, Spirit of Atlanta finished in 15th place at DCI Finals in College Park, Maryland. Following the 2000 season, Spirit of Atlanta re-organized in preparation for the summer of 2001. It officially relocated to Jacksonville, Alabama, and officially became known as "Spirit, from Jacksonville State University". This relationship with the university provided a foundation of stability the corps had not experienced for more than a decade. In 2001, the corps finished in 13th place while wearing baby blue uniforms again. In 2002, Spirit regained finalist status for the first time since 1990 finishing 10th overall. Spirit from JSU would make DCI Finals again in 2003 and '05-07. Going into the 2008 season the association with Jacksonville State University was essentially dissolved, resulting in a simplification of the corps' name to "Spirit Drum and Bugle Corps from Jacksonville, AL". The corps continued to operate out of Jacksonville, AL for the 2009 season.

=== 2010s and Return to Atlanta ===
In 2010, the corps surprised the drum corps community by announcing its return to Atlanta. After the 2010 season, it was announced by the corps' Board of Directors that for the 2011 season, the corps would once again be known as "Spirit of Atlanta Drum and Bugle Corps." Spirit of Atlanta surged back into finals again in 2011, jumping from 16th place the preceding season to 12th at DCI Finals.

=== 2020s ===
Spirit of Atlanta did not participate in the 2020 season due to the COVID-19 pandemic. They returned in 2021 alongside many other corps in a non-competitive "DCI celebration tour". On January 9, 2022, the corps was placed on a 24-month probation for misconduct. On January 16, 2022, the corps released a joint statement with DCI stating they would not be fielding a corps in 2022 in order to reorganize and would return the following year. During the 2022 season, Spirit of Atlanta's board of directors worked alongside industry experts in youth safety, risk mitigation and management, and with other youth activity leaders to create a safety program called SpiritSAFE. This multipurpose awareness and training program looks to go beyond current programs such as SafeSport by giving in-depth education and training to adults and student performers, providing specific reporting policies, and new human resources and risk management policies.

In 2026, Spirit of Atlanta returned to DCI World Championship Finals for the first time since 2013 with their program, "Golden Summer".

== Show summary (1977–2026) ==
Key
Pale green background indicates DCI World Class Semifinalist (Note: From 1977-1991, Spirit of Atlanta competed in Open Class; from 1992-2007 in Division I, and since 2008 in World Class. These are the same tier, just renamed.)
Pale blue background indicates DCI World Class Finalist

Year	Repertoire	World Championships	
Year	Repertoire	Score	Placement
1977	Carnival Overture by Antonín Dvořák / Music by John Miles / Woman In the Moon by Kenny Ascher & Paul Williams / Love the Feeling by Chuck Mangione	76.350	23rd Place; Open Class
1978	Walk Him Up the Stairs (from Purlie) by Gary Geld & Peter Udell / (Your Love Keeps Lifting Me) Higher and Higher by Gary Jackson, Raynard Miner & Carl Smith / Geodesic Dances by Wendy Carlos / "Let It Be Me" by Gilbert Bécaud, Mann Curtis & Pierre Delanoë	86.500	6th Place; Open Class; Finalist
1979	Georgia on My Mind by Hoagy Carmichael & Stuart Gorrell / Nutville by Horace Silver / Geodesic Dances by Wendy Carlos / Sweet Georgia Brown by Ben Bernie, Maceo Pinkard & Kenneth Casey / "Let It Be Me" by Gilbert Bécaud, Mann Curtis & Pierre Delanoë	89.900	4th Place; Open Class; Finalist
1980	Georgia on My Mind by Hoagy Carmichael & Stuart Gorrell / Ol' Man River (from Show Boat) by Jerome Kern & Oscar Hammerstein II / The Devil Went Down to Georgia by Vassar Clements, Tom Crain, Charlie Daniels, "Taz" DiGregorio, Fred Edwards, Charles Hayward & James W. Marshall / Sweet Georgia Brown by Ben Bernie, Maceo Pinkard & Kenneth Casey / "Let It Be Me" by Gilbert Bécaud, Mann Curtis & Pierre Delanoë	89.800	4th Place; Open Class; Finalist
1981	Georgia on My Mind by Hoagy Carmichael & Stuart Gorrell / Ol' Man River (from Show Boat) by Jerome Kern & Oscar Hammerstein II / The Devil Went Down to Georgia by Vassar Clements, Tom Crain, Charlie Daniels, "Taz" DiGregorio, Fred Edwards, Charles Hayward & James W. Marshall / You Are the Sunshine of My Life by Stevie Wonder / "Let It Be Me" by Gilbert Bécaud, Mann Curtis & Pierre Delanoë	83.850	9th Place; Open Class; Finalist
1982	You are My Sunshine by Jimmie Davis & Charles Mitchell / Oh Happy Day (from Li'l Abner) by Gene De Paul & Johnny Mercer / You Are the Sunshine of My Life by Stevie Wonder / Blue Rondo à la Turk by Dave Brubeck / We Are the Reason by David Meece	81.650	12th Place; Open Class; Finalist
1983	Los Hermanos De Bop by Mark Taylor / Blues in the Night by Harold Arlen & Johnny Mercer / No One Together by Kerry Livgren / We Are the Reason by David Meece	83.600	7th Place; Open Class; Finalist
1984	Porgy and Bess Overture; There's a Boat Dat's Leavin' Soon for New York & It Ain't Necessarily So (from Porgy and Bess) by George Gershwin / Blues in the Night by Harold Arlen & Johnny Mercer / No One Together by Kerry Livgren / I Loves You Porgy & Bess, You Is My Woman Now (from Porgy and Bess) by George Gershwin	93.100	6th Place; Open Class; Finalist
1985	Piano Concerto in F by George Gershwin	91.000	7th Place; Open Class; Finalist
1986	Dixie by Daniel Decatur Emmett / That Cat is High by J. Mayo Williams / Sweet Georgia Brown by Ben Bernie, Maceo Pinkard & Kenneth Casey / High on a Hill by Kerry Livgren / Precious Lord, Take My Hand by George Nelson Allen & Thomas A. Dorsey / Maybe God Is Tryin' To Tell You Somethin' (from The Color Purple) by Andraé Crouch & Quincy Jones	94.100	6th Place; Open Class; Finalist
1987	Are You From Dixie by George L. Cobb & Jack Yellen / Southern Medley by Daniel Decatur Emmett / Old Folks at Home by Stephen Foster / When the Saints Go Marching In by Virgil Oliver Stamps & Luther G. Presley / Basin Street Blues by Spencer Williams / Amazing Grace by William Walker & John Newton	87.600	10th Place; Open Class; Finalist
1988	Petrouchka; Petrouchka by Igor Stravinsky	89.300	9th Place; Open Class; Finalist
1989	Interstellar Suite by Amin Bhatia	82.200	14th Place; Open Class; Semifinalist
1990	Selections from Gone with the Wind by Max Steiner / Motherless Child Blues by Robert "Barbecue Bob" Hicks / African Drum Solo (from The Color Purple) by Quincy Jones / Precious Lord, Take My Hand by George Nelson Allen & Thomas A. Dorsey / Maybe God Is Tryin' to Tell You Somethin' (from The Color Purple) by Andraé Crouch & Quincy Jones	83.400	11th Place; Open Class; Finalist
1991	Call to Arms (from Glory) by James Horner / Variations on Dixie by Morton Gould / Antietam & Glory (from Glory) by James Horner / American Salute by Morton Gould / Closing Credits (from Glory) by James Horner	82.500	15th Place; Open Class; Semifinalist
1992	Songs of the New South; Ol' Man River & Can't Help Lovin' Dat Man (from Show Boat) by Jerome Kern & Oscar Hammerstein II / Miss Otis Regrets by Cole Porter / For the Beauty of the Earth by Folliott Sandford Pierpoint	78.800	16th Place; Division I Semifinalist
1993	A Soulful Celebration; Why do the Nations so Furiously Rage? by George Frederick Handel / David and Goliath (Traditional) / Do Not Pass Me By by William H. Doane & Frances J. Crosby / So Much 2 Say by Cedric Dent and Mervyn Warren / Let the Words (Traditional) / Better Watch Your Behavior by Gary Hines	77.900	17th Place; Division I Semifinalist
1994	Corps inactive		
1995	All On a Southern Afternoon; Ghost Train & XMas in Hooverville (from Fried Green Tomatoes) by Thomas Newman / Didn't it Rain? (Traditional) / Georgia on My Mind by Hoagy Carmichael & Stuart Gorrell	72.100	20th Place; Division I
1996	By George... It's Gershwin; Rhapsody in Blue by George Gershwin	68.000	23rd Place; Division I
1997	Southern Jazz: Spirit Style; Georgia on My Mind by Hoagy Carmichael & Stuart Gorrell / Ol' Man River (from Show Boat) by Jerome Kern & Oscar Hammerstein II / Amazing Grace by William Walker & John Newton / Walk Him Up the Stairs (from Purlie) by Gary Geld & Peter Udell / "Let It Be Me" by Gilbert Bécaud, Mann Curtis & Pierre Delanoë	76.500	17th Place; Division I Semifinalist
1998	My Friend (from The Life) by Cy Coleman & Ira Gasman / Swanee River by Stephen Collins Foster / Precious Lord, Take My Hand by George Nelson Allen & Thomas A. Dorsey / Sweet Georgia Brown by Ben Bernie, Maceo Pinkard & Kenneth Casey / Maybe God Is Tryin' to Tell You Somethin' (from The Color Purple) by Andraé Crouch & Quincy Jones	83.100	14th Place; Division I Semifinalist
1999	Jump, Jive, Jazz and Wail; Since I Don't Have You by Jackie Taylor, James Beaumont, Janet Vogel, Joseph Rock, Joe Verscharen, Lennie Martin & Wally Lester / Nutville by Horace Silver / Hollywood Nocturne by Brian Setzer / Jump, Jive an' Wail by Louie Prima	76.900	16th Place; Division I Semifinalist
2000	Southern Harmonies... Music For the New South; Jubilee & Movement 5 (from Spiritual) by Morton Gould / Wonderous Love (from Southern Harmony) by Donald Grantham / The Glory and The Grandeur by Russell Peck	80.650	15th Place; Division I Semifinalist
2001	Ghost Train; The Ride, At the Station & The Motive Revolution (The Ghost Train Triptych) by Eric Whitacre	84.050	13th Place; Division I Semifinalist
2002	Darkness Into Light; Symphonia Resurrectus (from Easter Symphony) by David Holsinger	85.450	10th Place; Division I Finalist
2003	TIME; Time After Time by Sammy Cahn & Jule Styne / Time in a Bottle by Jim Croce / Auld Lang Syne by Robert Burns / Somewhere in Time by John Barry / Whirr, Whirr, Whirr by Ralph Hultgren / October by Eric Whitacre / "Let It Be Me" by Gilbert Bécaud, Mann Curtis & Pierre Delanoë / Nutville by Horace Silver / No Jive by Bob Mintzer / Appalachian Morning by Paul Halley	84.400	12th Place; Division I Finalist
2004	The Architecture of Life; Mindscape by Richard Saucedo / Dreamscape: Sonoran Desert Holiday by Ron Nelson / Soundscape (Original) / Urbanscape: On the Town by Leonard Bernstein / Urbanscape: Bizarro by Michael Daugherty	86.300	13th Place; Division I Semifinalist
2005	The Spirit of Broadway; Give My Regards to Broadway (from Yankee Doodle Dandy) by George M. Cohan / New York, New York (from On the Town) by Leonard Bernstein / On Broadway by Barry Mann, Cynthia Weil, Jerry Leiber & Mike Stoller / They're Playing Our Song by Marvin Hamlisch & Carole Bayer Sager / Entre Act & Not While I'm Around (from Sweeney Todd) by Stephen Sondheim / Pie Jesu (from Requiem) by Andrew Lloyd Webber / Luck Be a Lady (from Guys and Dolls) by Frank Loesser / No One Mourns the Wicked & Defying Gravity (from Wicked) by Stephen Schwartz	86.075	12th Place; Division I Finalist
2006	Old, New, Borrowed, and Blue; Old Man River (from Show Boat) by Jerome Kern & Oscar Hammerstein II / That Old Black Magic by Harold Arlen & Johnny Mercer / The Notebook by Aaron Zigman / Waltz of the Mushroom Hunters by Greg Hopkins / Blues in the Night by Harold Arlen & Johnny Mercer / Blue Shades by Frank Ticheli	84.825	12th Place; Division I Finalist
2007	Genesis; Fluttering Maple Leaves by Jun Nagao / Hide and Seek by Imogen Heap / New Century Dawn by David Gillingham	84.500	12th Place; Division I Finalist
2008	Per-if-4-ry; Equus by Eric Whitacre / Corynorhinus & Myotis (from Batman Begins) by James Newton Howard & Hans Zimmer / The Sacrifice & The Heart Asks Pleasure First (from The Piano) by Michael Nyman	83.175	15th Place; World Class; Semifinalist
2009	Live... In Concert! Song for America, Carry On Wayward Son & Dust In The Wind by Kerry Livgren / Journey from Mariabronn by Kerry Livgren & Steve Walsh	80.450	17th Place; World Class; Semifinalist
2010	Forging an Icon; Piano Concerto No. 1 by Keith Emerson / Symphony No. 5 in B-Flat Major by Sergei Prokofiev / Prelude (from Psycho) by Bernard Herrmann / Brooklyn Bridge by Michael Daugherty / Serenada Schizophrana by Danny Elfman	81.450	16th Place; World Class; Semifinalist
2011	ATL Confidential: A Tribute to Film Noir; Death at the Olympic (from The Black Dahlia) by Mark Isham / Love Theme (from Chinatown) by Jerry Goldsmith / Harlem Nocturne by Earle Hagen and Dick Rogers / Prelude (from On Dangerous Ground) by Bernard Herrmann	85.350	12th Place; World Class; Finalist
2012	Sin City; Music from Bullitt by Lalo Schifrin / Luck Be A Lady (from Guys and Dolls) by Frank Loesser / Harvest Concerto for Trombone by John Mackey / Poker Face by Stefani Germanotta (Lady Gaga) & Nadir Khayat / Music from Mr. & Mrs. Smith by John Powell	84.400	11th Place; World Class; Finalist
2013	Speakeasy; Concerto in F by George Gershwin / Crazy World by Henry Mancini / Overture (from Chicago) by John Kander / Solace by Scott Joplin / Songs for Simon by John Psathas / Sweet Georgia Brown by Ben Bernie, Maceo Pinkard & Kenneth Casey / Symphony No. 1 by Paul Creston	86.400	11th Place; World Class; Finalist
2014	Magnolia; Down to the River to Pray (Traditional) / Promised Land (from Porgy and Bess) by George Gershwin / Willow Weep for Me by Ann Ronell / Jubal Step (from All Rise) by Wynton Marsalis / I Need Thee Every Hour by Annie S. Hawks & Robert Lowry	81.550	17th Place; World Class; Semifinalist
2015	Out of the Ashes; Tara's Theme (from Gone with the Wind) by Max Steiner / Southern Harmony by Donald Grantham / Full Pull & Cage Match (from Music from the Redneck Songbook II) by Scott McAllister / Wild Nights (from Harmonium) by John Adams / Original Music by William Pitts, Ben Pyles & Greg Tsalikis	78.125	18th Place; World Class; Semifinalist
2016	Georgia; Rusty Air in Carolina by Mason Bates / Georgia by Thomas Calloway (Cee Lo Green) & Brian Burton (Danger Mouse) / Can't Help Falling in Love by Hugo Peretti, Luigi Creatore & George David Weiss / Sweet Georgia Brown by Ben Bernie, Maceo Pinkard & Kenneth Casey / Georgia on My Mind by Hoagy Carmichael & Stuart Gorrell	76.675	21st Place; World Class; Semifinalist
2017	Crossroads: We Are Here; Where Am I Going? by Gino Vannelli / Wine–Dark Sea (Mvt. I – Hubris) by John Mackey / Eric's Song by Vienna Teng / Liquid Dance by A.R. Rahman / Shofukan (We Like It Here) by Michael League (Snarky Puppy)	80.075	18th Place; World Class; Semifinalist
2018	Knock; LIT by Timothy Henson, Scott LePage, Clay Gober & Clay Aeschliman (Polyphia) & Nick Sampson / Freak Flag by Casanova Harry, Eddie Francis & O.G. Spezzano (Here Come the Mummies) / Hurt by Trent Reznor / Rattletrap by Bill Evans / Break on Through (To the Other Side) by Jim Morrison, Ray Manzarek, John Densmore & Robby Krieger (The Doors)	85.588	13th Place; World Class; Semifinalist
2019	Neon Underground; Intro by Matt Filosa, John Cypert, & Chris Moore / Krump by Scott McAllister / You and Me by Howard Lawrence, Guy Lawrence (Disclosure), James Napier & Eliza Caird (Eliza Doolittle) / Attraction by Emmanuel Séjourné / Color Wheel by Joey Izzo, Adam Rafowitz, Adam Bentley, Joe Calderone & Richie Martinez (Arch Echo)	85.587	13th Place; World Class; Semifinalist
2020	Season cancelled due to the COVID-19 pandemic		
2021	Bottle Tree; Proverb by Steve Reich / Lilac Wine by Jeff Buckley / Mother Earth by David Maslanka / Djinn by John Psathas / Selections from WALL-E / Remember Me by Thomas Bergersen	No scored competitions	
2022	Corps inactive		
2023	Up Down and All Around; Route 12 by Thomas Newman / What Goes Up by Alan Parsons / Metroliner by Eric Andrew Hirsch / Stuff We Did by Randy Newman / My Human Heart by Coldplay & Jacob Collier / Promise by Thomas Bergersen	83.625	15th Place; World Class; Semifinalist
2024	Creatures; Reborn (from Hereditary) by Colin Stetson / Smoke on the Water by Ritchie Blackmore, Ian Gillan, Roger Glover, Jon Lord & Ian Paice / Frolic (from Rabbit and Rogue) by Danny Elfman / Feste Romane by Ottorino Respighi / A Close Friend (from Fantastic Beasts and Where to Find Them) by James Newton Howard / Night Creature by Duke Ellington / What Could Have Been (from Arcane: League of Legends) by Alexander Miller & Alexander Seaver	83.675	16th Place; World Class; Semifinalist
2025	Rocket; Leonardo Dreams of His Flying Machine by Eric Whitacre / Rocket by Def Leppard / Hyperjump (from WALL-E) by Thomas Newman / I Am the Antichrist to You by Kishi Bashi / Whatcha Want by Lawrence / Intoxicated by Martin Solveig / Rocket Man by Elton John / Also sprach Zarathustra by Richard Strauss	86.800	13th Place; World Class; Semifinalist
2026	Golden Summer; Georgia on My Mind by Hoagy Carmichael / School's Out by Alice Cooper / Rotten Tulip, P.O.G. & Through Thick and Thin by No Soap, Radio / Summer, Mvt. III by Antonio Vivaldi / A Midsummer Night's Dream, Mvt. I (Scherzo) by Felix Mendelssohn / Race with Devil on Spanish Highway by Al Di Meola / Open Up Wide by Bill Chase / Golden Slumbers by Lennon–McCartney / Robert Henry by The Westerlies / Summertime by George Gershwin "Let It Be Me" by Gilbert Bécaud, Mann Curtis & Pierre Delanoë	88.588	10th Place; World Class; Finalist

== Caption awards ==
At the annual World Championship Finals, Drum Corps International presents awards to the corps with the high average scores from prelims, semifinals, and finals in five captions. Prior to 2000 and the adoption of the current scoring format, Spirit of Atlanta won these captions:

High Color Guard Award

- 1985, 1987
