= Roger Robinson (actor) =

American actor (1940–2018)

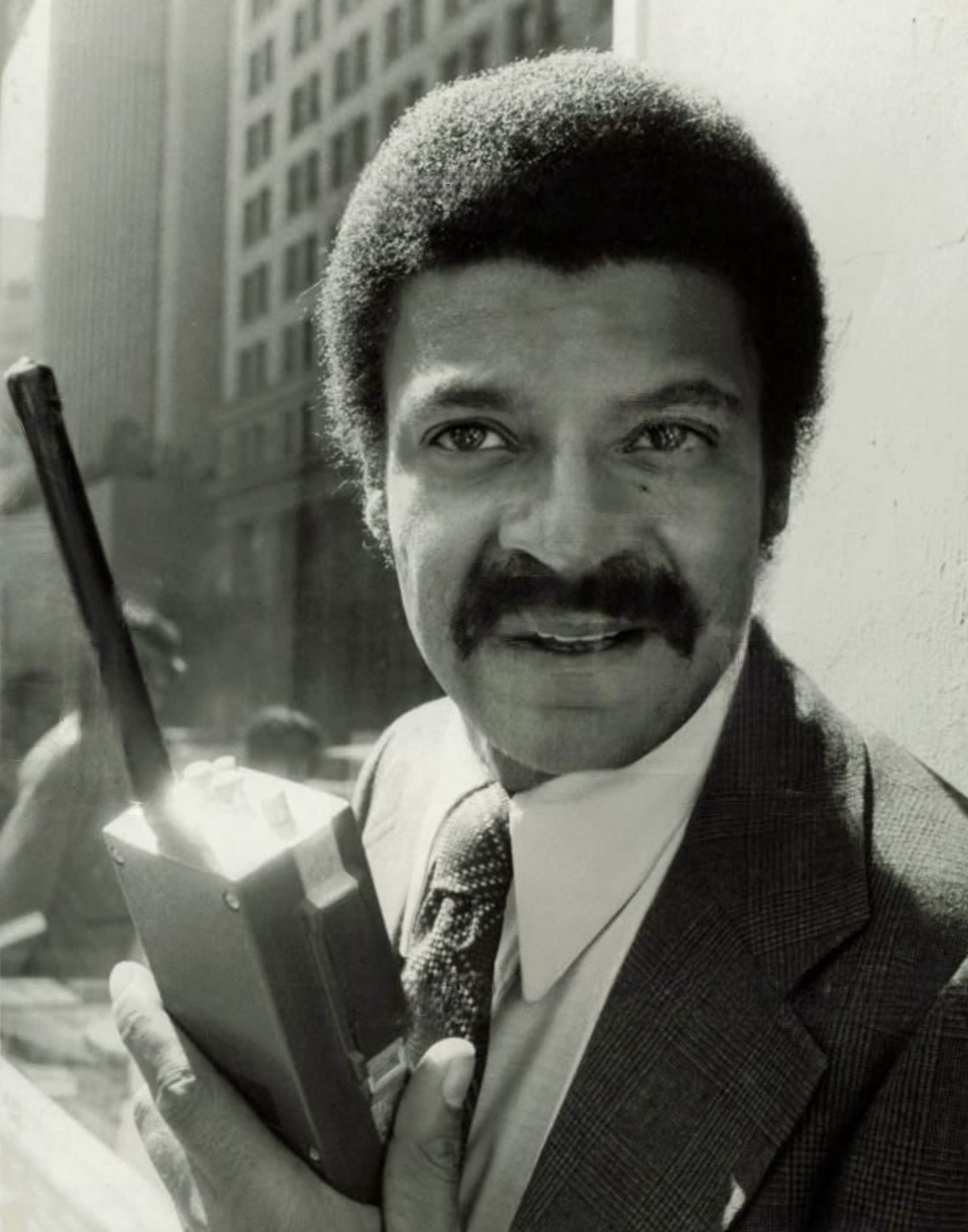
- Robinson in Kojak, 1975
- Born: May 2, 1940; Seattle, Washington, U.S.
- Died: September 26, 2018 (aged 78); Escondido, California, U.S.
- Occupation: Actor
- Years active: 1969–2018

Roger Robinson (May 2, 1940 – September 26, 2018) was an American actor. He was probably best known for playing Detective Gil Weaver in the American crime drama television series Kojak. Robinson received the Tony Award for Best Performance by a Featured Actor in a Play for the 2009 revival of Joe Turner's Come and Gone by August Wilson.

== Life and career ==
Born in Seattle, Washington, Robinson made his Broadway debut in 1969 in Does a Tiger Wear a Necktie? opposite Al Pacino. Additional theatre credits include Amen Corner, The Iceman Cometh, and Seven Guitars, which garnered him his first Tony nomination.

Robinson appeared in six of August Wilson's ten plays chronicling African-American life in the 20th century. He felt the playwright's "use of language is second to none, except Eugene O'Neill and perhaps Tennessee Williams." Robinson was the first African American to receive the Richard Seff Award, presented annually by the Actors' Equity Foundation to an actor fifty years of age or older for his performance in a supporting role in a Broadway or off-Broadway production.

Robinson's film credits include Believe in Me (1971), Willie Dynamite (1974), Newman's Law (1974), Meteor (1979), It's My Turn (1980), The Lonely Guy (1984), Who's the Man? (1993), Wedding Daze (2006), and Brother to Brother (2004). The latter won him the LA Outfest Grand Jury Award Outstanding Actor in a Feature Film and a nomination for the Independent Spirit Award for Best Supporting Male.

Robinson's television credits include the television miniseries King, TV-movie The Marcus-Nelson Murders, which led to a recurring role as Detective Gil Weaver on Kojak, a regular role on the short-lived Mary Stuart Masterson series Kate Brasher, and guest appearances on Ironside, Starsky and Hutch, The Jeffersons, A Man Called Hawk, Law & Order, New York Undercover, Homicide: Life on the Street, ER, Kojak, and NYPD Blue. On ABC's How to Get Away With Murder, he played Mac Harkness, the father of Viola Davis' Annalise Keating. He also wrote material for Martin Lawrence Presents: 1st Amendment Stand-Up.

== Filmography ==
=== Film ===
Roger Robinson film credits
Year	Title	Role	Notes
1971	Believe in Me	Angel	
1974	Willie Dynamite	Bell	
1974	Newman's Law	Garry	
1979	Meteor	Bill Hunter	
1980	It's My Turn	Flicker	
1984	The Lonely Guy	Greeting Card Supervisor	
1992	Flodder in Amerika	Zwerver	
1993	Who's the Man?	Charlie	
1995	Burnzy's Last Call	Russell	
2004	Brother to Brother	Bruce	
2005	On the One	Butter	
2006	Wedding Daze	Dr. Favreau	
2011	Smoking Nonsmoking	Jeffries	
2014	Foreclosure		
2014	H.	Harold	
2016	Custody	Martha's Father	
2016	Vineland	Father Gordon	

=== Television ===
Roger Robinson television credits
Year	Title	Role	Notes
1973	The Marcus-Nelson Murders	Bobbie Martin	TV movie
1973	Ironside	Shuggle	Episode: "The Last Payment"
1973–1976	Kojak	Gil Weaver	12 episodes
1974	The F.B.I.	Floyd Carter	Episode: "Selkirk's War"
1974	Get Christie Love!	Casey Hunter	Episode: "The Longest Fall"
1974	This Is the West That Was		TV movie
1975	Starsky and Hutch	Dewey Hughes	Episode: "Kill Huggy Bear"
1975	The Family Holvak	Lonnie Beckworth	Episode: "The Tribute"
1976	Mallory: Circumstantial Evidence	Cliff Wilson	TV movie
1976	Captains and the Kings	Cpl. Lincoln Douglas	Episode: "Chapter VII"
1976-1977	Baretta	El Dorado, David	2 episodes
1978	King	Reverend Free Shuttlesworth	TV miniseries
1978	Quincy, M.E.	Dr. Eric Taylor	Episode: "Death by Good Intentions"
1979	Friends	Warren Summerfield	5 episodes
1979	The Runaways	Chuck Bishop	Episode: "Wrong Way Street"
1979	Eischied	Detective Chasin	2 episodes
1979	The Jeffersons	Mark Randolph	Episode: "Baby Love"
1980	The Righteous Apples	Charles	Episode: "Convictions"
1980	The Incredible Hulk	Capt. Welsh	Episode: "Prometheus: Part 1"
1981	The Dukes of Hazzard	Roy Landry	Episode: "Mrs. Daisy Hogg"
1981	The Two of Us	Dr. Matthews	Episode: "A Family Counseled"
1982	A House Divided: Denmark Vesey's Rebellion	George Wilson	TV movie
1982	Cassie & Co.	Joe Princess	Episode: "A Ring Ain't Always a Circle"
1983	Voyagers!	Seth	Episode: "All Fall Down"
1986	The Equalizer	Mr. Selby	Episode: "Joyride"
1989	A Man Called Hawk	Cy Ferris	Episode: "Poison"
1989	Money, Power, Murder	Willie B	TV movie
1991	Law & Order	Dr. Ames	Episode: "Sonata for Solo Organ"
1992	The Cosby Show	Mitch Lawson	Episode: “You Can't Stop the Music”
1997	New York Undercover	Major Harold Williams	Episode: “The Promised Land”
1997	Homicide: Life on the Street	Burundi Robinson	Episode: “Narcissus”
1998	Vig	Phil	TV movie
1998	ER	Mr. Wass	Episode: “A Hole in the Heart”
2001	Kate Brasher	Earl	6 episodes
2001	ER	Carl Ferris	2 episodes
2002	The Education of Max Bickford	Carl	Episode: “The Pursuit of Happiness”
2002	NYPD Blue	Al Simons	Episode: “One in the Nuts”
2010	Rubicon	Ed Bancroft	6 episodes
2013	Elementary	Bruce Kushner	Episode: “The Deductionist”
2015	American Masters	Bynum	Episode: “August Wilson: The Ground on Which I Stand”
2016–2018	How to Get Away With Murder	Mac Harkness	4 episodes
2017	The Immortal Life of Henrietta Lacks	Day Lacks	TV movie

=== Stage ===
Year	Title	Role	Notes
1969	Does a Tiger Wear a Necktie?	Conrad	Belasco Theatre, Broadway
1969	The Miser	La Fleche	Vivian Beaumont Theater, Broadway
1983	Amen Corner	Luke	Nederlander Theatre, Broadway
1985	The Iceman Cometh	Joe Mott	Lunt-Fontanne Theatre, Broadway
1987	Of Mice and Men	Crooks	Roundabout Theatre Company, Off-Broadway
1996	Seven Guitars	Hedley	Walter Kerr Theatre, Broadway
1998	St. Louis Woman	Ragsdale	New York City Center, Off-Broadway
1998	Elaborate Lives: The Legend of Aida	Amonasro	Alliance Theatre
2000	The Cherry Orchard	Firs	McCarter Theatre
2001	Jitney	Becker	Royal National Theatre
2004	Drowning Crow	Eugene Dawn	Biltmore Theatre, Broadway
2009	Joe Turner's Come and Gone	Bynum	Belasco Theatre, Broadway
2018	Some Old Black Man	Donald	59E59 Theater, Broadway
