= Brian Hyland =

American pop and country singer (born 1943)

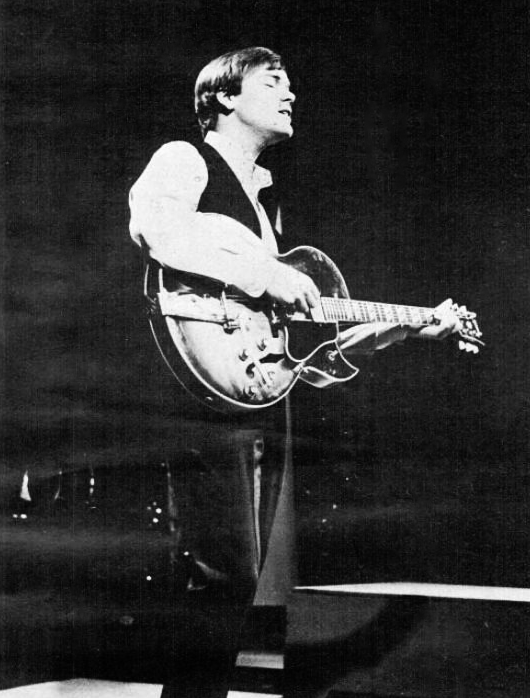
- Hyland performing in 1967

Background information
- Born: November 12, 1943 (age 82); Queens, New York City, U.S.
- Genres: Bubblegum, pop, country
- Occupation: Singer
- Instruments: Vocals; guitar; clarinet; harmonica
- Years active: 1959–present
- Labels: Kapp Records; Leader Records; ABC-Paramount Records; Philips Records; Dot Records; Uni Records
- Website: brianhyland.com

Brian Hyland (born November 12, 1943) is an American pop singer and instrumentalist who was particularly successful during the early 1960s. He had a No. 1 hit on the Billboard Hot 100 with "Itsy Bitsy Teenie Weenie Yellow Polkadot Bikini" in 1960. Other hits include "Sealed with a Kiss" and "Gypsy Woman", which both reached No. 3. Hyland continued recording into the 1970s. AllMusic journalist Jason Ankeny said: "Hyland's puppy-love pop virtually defined the sound and sensibility of bubblegum during the pre-Beatles era." Although his status as a teen idol faded, he went on to release several country-influenced albums and had additional chart hits later in his career.

== Biography ==
Hyland was born in Woodhaven, Queens, New York City. He studied guitar and clarinet as a child and sang in his church choir. At 14, he co-founded the harmony group the Del-Fi's, which recorded a demo but failed to secure a recording contract. Hyland was eventually signed by Kapp Records as a solo artist and released his debut single, "Rosemary", in late 1959. The label employed the Brill Building songwriting duo of Lee Pockriss and Paul Vance to work with Hyland on the follow-up, "Four Little Heels (The Clickety Clack Song)", which was a minor hit, and the songwriting duo continued to work with Hyland.

In August 1960, at the age of 16, Hyland scored his first and biggest hit single, "Itsy Bitsy Teenie Weenie Yellow Polka Dot Bikini", written by Vance and Pockriss. It was a novelty song that reached No. 1 on the Billboard Hot 100 chart (No. 8 in the UK) and sold almost a million copies in the first two months of its release and over two million copies in total.

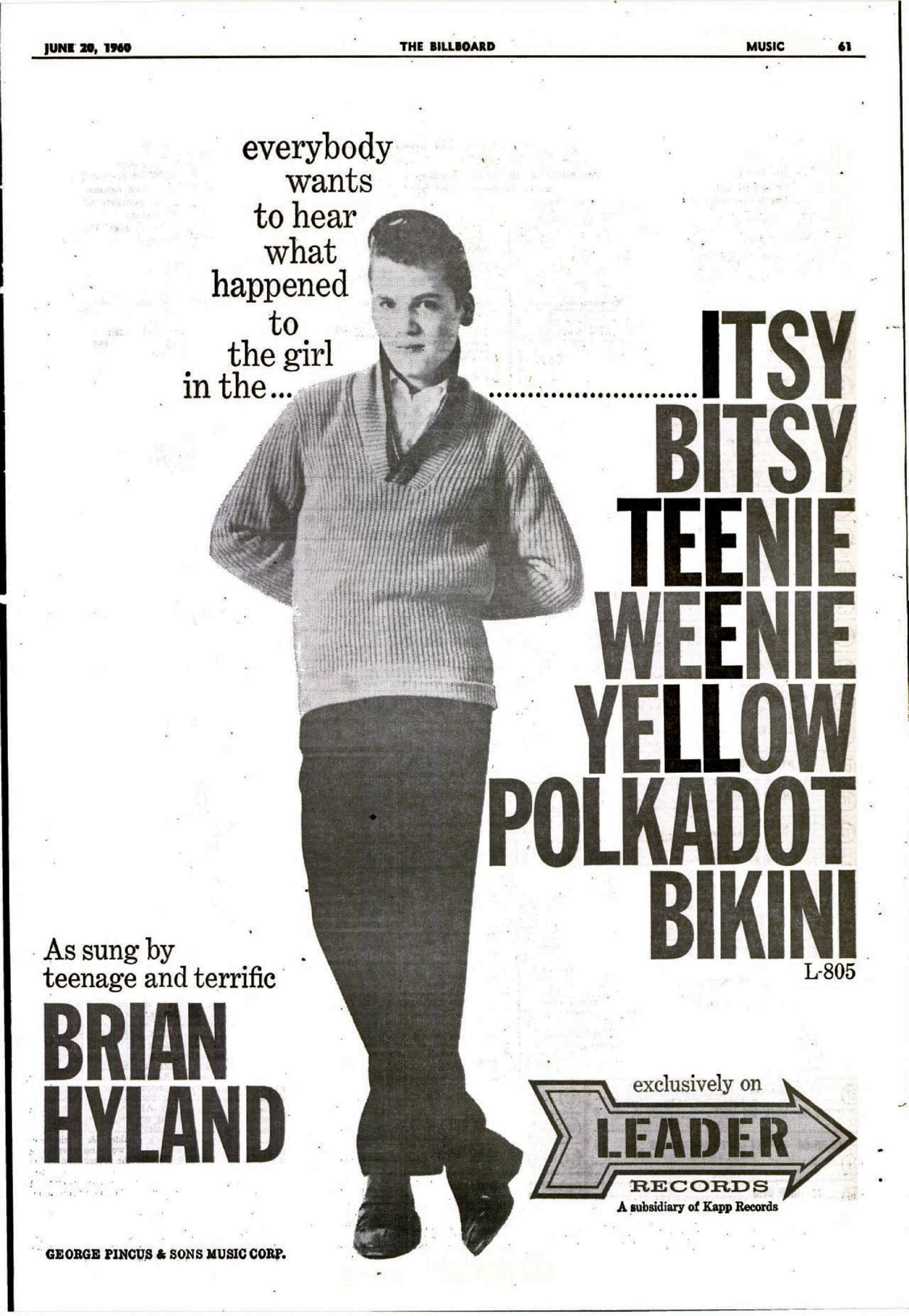
Billboard advertisement, June 20, 1960

Hyland moved on to ABC-Paramount Records, where he began working with the songwriting and production team of Gary Geld and Peter Udell, and further hits followed with "Let Me Belong to You" and "I'll Never Stop Wanting You". In 1961, aged 17, he appeared as himself on the March 6 episode of the game show To Tell the Truth. He received three votes.

His other major hit during this period was 1962's "Sealed with a Kiss", which reached No. 3 in 1962 on both the American and UK Singles Chart. Another 1962 hit was "Ginny Come Lately", which reached No. 21 on the U.S. chart and No. 5 in the UK. Hyland's 1962 Top 30 hit "Warmed-Over Kisses (Leftover Love)" incorporated elements of country music; he continued in that crossover vein with singles including "I May Not Live to See Tomorrow" and "I'm Afraid to Go Home" and on the 1964 album Country Meets Folk. This approach was out of step with the changes in the pop music market brought about by British Invasion bands. Hyland's commercial success declined, but he had further hits with "The Joker Went Wild" and "Run, Run, Look and See", working with producer Snuff Garrett and session musicians including J. J. Cale and Leon Russell.

Hyland appeared on national television programs such as American Bandstand and The Jackie Gleason Show and toured both internationally and around America with Dick Clark in the Caravan of Stars. The caravan was in Dallas, Texas, on the day of the assassination of President Kennedy in 1963. In response to the event, Hyland wrote the song "Mail Order Gun", which he recorded and eventually released on his 1970 eponymous album.

From 1963 through 1969, Hyland scored several minor hits, but none reached higher on the U.S. pop chart than No. 20 ("The Joker Went Wild"). An album released in 1964 featured numbers that hearkened back to the 1950s, including such hits as "Pledging My Love" and "Moments to Remember"—at a time when The Beatles and other British Invasion acts were drowning out American artists. Hyland afterward shifted into a phase of recording country and folk rock styles. Songs such as "I'm Afraid to Go Home" and "Two Brothers" had an American Civil War theme. Hyland played the harmonica on a few numbers.

Hyland attempted several departures from the norm, including the psychedelic single "Get the Message" (No. 91 on the U.S. pop chart) and "Holiday for Clowns" (No. 94), but despite their more contemporary arrangements, they failed to receive much airplay. He went on to chart just two more top 40 hits, both cover versions: "Gypsy Woman", a 1961 hit for the Impressions written by Curtis Mayfield, and "Lonely Teardrops", a 1959 hit for Jackie Wilson. Hyland recorded both in 1970, and Del Shannon produced the tracks. "Gypsy Woman" reached No. 3 on the 1970 U.S. pop chart, making it the second-biggest hit of his career, selling over one million copies and being certified gold by the RIAA in January 1971. Two of his previous hits, "Itsy Bitsy Teenie Weenie Yellow Polkadot Bikini" and "Sealed with a Kiss", were also awarded gold discs.

In 1975, "Sealed With A Kiss" became a hit again in the UK (No. 7) and Hyland performed the song on Top of the Pops on July 31 of the same year. By 1977, he and his family had settled in New Orleans, and in 1979 the In a State of Bayou album, on which he had worked with Allen Toussaint, was issued by the Private Stock label.

In June 1988, Dutch singer Albert West asked Hyland to record with him some duets of Hyland's hits: "Itsy Bitsy Teenie Weenie Yellow Polkadot Bikini", "Sealed With A Kiss", and "Ginny Come Lately". West had covered the last of these in 1973, scoring a huge European hit, his biggest. Their duet of "Itsy Bitsy ..." was released as a single and reached No. 43 on the Dutch singles chart. Hyland and West performed on TV shows in Germany and Belgium and a Dutch TV special in Aruba.

Sixty years after the release of "Sealed with a Kiss", Hyland reunited with Peter Udell, who invited him to record "A Little Bit of Christmas Time". It was released on Solar Music in late 2023.

== Personal life ==
In 2021 Hyland married Kathalynn Turner Davis, an actress, writer, and psychotherapist. In a 2025 Goldmine interview, Hyland clarified that previous reports claiming his former wife had co-written music with him were inaccurate and stated that he was the sole writer of the songs attributed to him. He noted that she occasionally appeared onstage playing tambourine, but was not a songwriter; their son, Bodi, was their drummer.

Hyland's cousin Mabel Haney was the wife of Larry Fine of The Three Stooges.

== Catalog consolidation ==
From 1960 to 1977, Hyland recorded a total of eleven albums for several different record companies. A twelfth album, Young Years, was a reissue. They included Leader Records, ABC-Paramount Records, Philips Records, Dot Records and Uni Records. Over the years, these record labels were consolidated and the recordings are now controlled by Universal Music. Universal has yet to release a CD compilation that includes all of Hyland's charted singles, invariably omitting a handful of minor singles that made the Billboard Top 100 (or the Bubbling Under chart).

- 1967 – Leader Records ("Itsy Bitsy ...") owner Kapp Records sold to MCA, Inc. and becomes co-owned with Uni Records ("Gypsy Woman").
- 1974 – Dot Records ("Tragedy") sold to ABC Records ("Sealed with a Kiss")
- 1979 – MCA Records buys ABC Records
- 1998 – MCA parent Universal Music buys Philips Records ("The Joker Went Wild") owner PolyGram completing the catalog consolidation

== Discography ==
=== Albums ===
Year	Album	Billboard 200	Record Label
1960	The Bashful Blond	—	Kapp
1961	Let Me Belong to You	—	ABC-Paramount
1962	Sealed with a Kiss	—	ABC-Paramount
1964	Country Meets Folk	—	ABC-Paramount
1964	Here's to Our Love	—	Philips
1965	Rockin' Folk	—	Philips
1966	The Joker Went Wild Run Run Look and See	—	Philips
1969	Stay and Love Me All Summer	—	Dot
1969	Tragedy - A Million To One	160	Dot
1970	Brian Hyland	171	Uni
1977	In a State of Bayou	—	Private Stock
"—" denotes releases that did not chart.

=== Singles ===
Year	Title (Songwriters)	Peak chart positions			
Year	Title (Songwriters)	US	UK	AUS	NED
1960	"Itsy Bitsy Teenie Weenie Yellow Polkadot Bikini" (Lee Pockriss/Paul Vance)	1	8	2	3
1960	"Four Little Heels (The Clickety Clack Song)" (Lee Pockriss/Paul Vance)	73	29	29	—
1960	"That's How Much" (Jack Keller/Artie Kaplan/Brooks Arthur)	74	—	—	—
1960	"Lop-Sided, Over-Loaded (And It Wiggled When We Rode It)" (Larry Kusik/E.J. Anton)	105	—	—	—
1961	"I Gotta Go ('Cause I Love You)" (John D. Loudermilk)	101	—	—	—
1961	"Let Me Belong to You" (Gary Geld/Peter Udell)	20	—	—	—
1961	"I'll Never Stop Wanting You" (Gary Geld/Peter Udell)	83	—	—	—
1961	"She's My All American Girl" (Gary Geld/Peter Udell)	—	—	—	—
1962	"Ginny Come Lately" (Gary Geld/Peter Udell)	21	5	19	4
1962	"Sealed with a Kiss" (Gary Geld/Peter Udell)	3	3	22	6
1962	"Warmed Over Kisses (Left Over Love)" (Gary Geld/Peter Udell)	25	28	42	—
1963	"I May Not Live to See Tomorrow" (Gary Geld/Peter Udell)	69	—	—	—
1963	"If Mary's There" (Gary Geld/Peter Udell)	88	—	—	—
1963	"I'm Afraid to Go Home" b/w "Save Your Heart for Me" (Gary Geld/Peter Udell)	63	—	—	—
1963	"Let Us Make Our Own Mistakes" (Gary Geld/Peter Udell)	123	—	—	—
1964	"Here's to Our Love" (Peter Udell)	129	—	—	—
1966	"3000 Miles" (Artie Wayne)	99	—	—	—
1966	"The Joker Went Wild" (Bobby Russell)	20	—	23	—
1966	"Run, Run, Look and See" (M.H. Cooper/Ray Whitley)	25	—	38	—
1967	"Hung Up in Your Eyes" (Sonny Curtis/Glen D. Hardin)	58	—	—	—
1967	"Holiday for Clowns" (Sonny Curtis/Glen D. Hardin)	94	—	—	—
1967	"Get the Message" (Michael Z. Gordon/J. A. Griffin)	91	—	—	—
1969	"Tragedy" (Gerald H. Nelson/Fred B. Burch)	56	—	—	—
1969	"A Million to One" (Phil Medley)	90	—	—	—
1969	"Stay and Love Me All Summer" (Joel Hirschhorn/Al Kasha)	82	—	—	—
1970	"Dreamy Eyes" (Johnny Tillotson)	—	—	—	—
1970	"Gypsy Woman" (Curtis Mayfield)	3	42	9	19
1971	"Lonely Teardrops" (Tyran Carlo/Gwen Fuqua/Berry Gordy Jr.)	54	—	75	—
1971	"So Long, Marianne" (Leonard Cohen)	120	—	—	—
1972	"I Love Every Little Thing About You" (Stevie Wonder)	—	—	—	—
1972	"Only Wanna Make You Happy" (Bobby Hart/Wes Farrell)	—	—	—	—
1975	"Sealed with a Kiss" (re-issue) (Gary Geld/Peter Udell)	—	7	—	—
1988	"Itsy Bitsy Teenie Weenie Yellow Polkadot Bikini" (with Albert West) (Lee Pockriss/Paul Vance)	—	—	—	43
"—" denotes releases that did not chart or were not released in that territory.

== See also ==
- List of artists who reached number one in the United States
- List of artists who reached number one on the Australian singles chart
- List of acts who appeared on American Bandstand
