= Let Me Belong to You =

Single by Brian Hyland

from the album Let Me Belong to You
- B-side: "Let It Die!"
- Released: July 25, 1961
- Recorded: 1961
- Genre: Pop
- Length: 3:04
- Label: ABC Paramount
- Songwriters: Peter Udell, Gary Geld
- Producer: Pogo Productions

Brian Hyland singles chronology
"I Gotta Go" (1961)	"Let Me Belong to You" (1961)	"I'll Never Stop Wanting You" (1961)

Let Me Belong to You is a song written and recorded in 1961 by Canadian singer Peter Udell and Gary Geld and performed by American singer Brian Hyland. It peaked at number 20 on the Billboard Hot 100 in 1961.
