= George Nelson Allen =

American composer and geologist

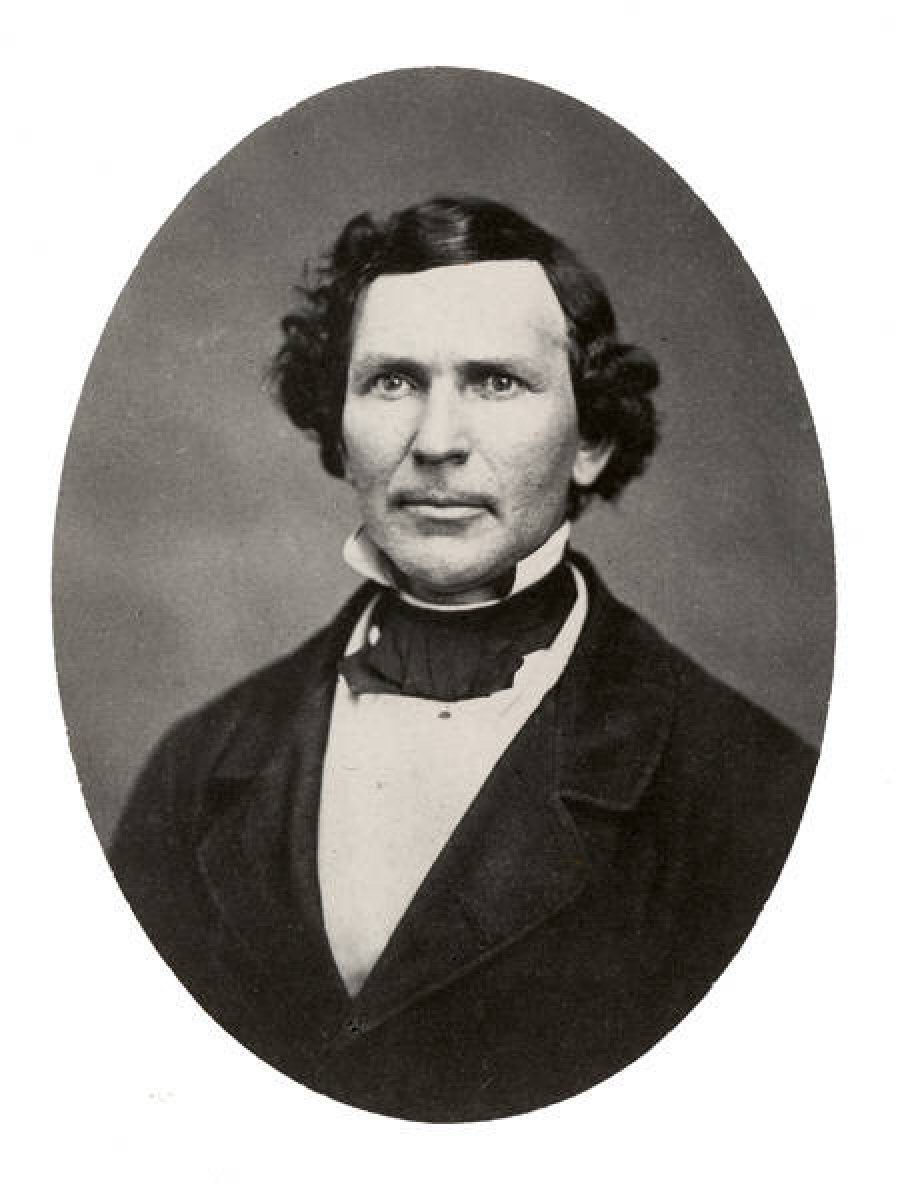
George Nelson Allen

George Nelson Allen (September 7, 1812 – December 9, 1877) was an American composer and geologist who was associated with Oberlin College, where he taught for 34 years. He is primarily known today for writing the melody to the hymn Precious Lord, Take My Hand. He also served on the first geological survey of Yellowstone National Park, under Ferdinand Vandeveer Hayden.

== Early years ==
George Nelson Allen was born in Mansfield, Massachusetts, to Otis Allen and Susanna Allen. He had four siblings; his mother was a teacher. While living near Boston he studied music under Music Education pioneer Lowell Mason.

== Oberlin ==
When George turned 20 he tried to go to Lyman Beecher, an important figure in the Second Great Awakening, in Cincinnati, Ohio, where he was running a seminary. George fell ill along the way and never made it, instead studying at Adelbert College. In 1835 he transferred to Oberlin College, and in 1837 while still a student was named the school's instructor of music, replacing Elihu Parsons Ingersoll, who had a few years prior become the first college Music professor in the United States. In 1841, he married Caroline Mary Rudd, a classmate at Oberlin. George and Caroline had five children.

In 1844 Oberlin published Allen's Social and Sabbath Hymn Book, a collection of hymns. One of the hymn melodies in this book, entitled Maitland, was used as the setting for Must Jesus Bear the Cross Alone, whose words were originally written by Thomas Shepherd in 1693. Many years later Thomas A. Dorsey would use the melody as the setting to his own hymn, Precious Lord, Take My Hand, which became popular through its association with Martin Luther King Jr. and the Civil Rights Movement.

== Geology ==
In 1847 George Allen was appointed Professor of Geology and Natural History, in addition to his music position. In his position he sought to harmonize religion and the Genesis account of creation with modern science, particularly Darwinism. As part of his duties he went on trips to Jamaica in 1864, and Yellowstone in 1871, to collect geological and botanical specimens. Ferdinand Vandeveer Hayden, who led the Yellowstone expedition, was one of his former geology students.

== Retirement and death ==
In 1864, due to poor health, he resigned his music position; in 1871 he retired from teaching. In 1874, he moved to Cincinnati to be near his son; he died there in 1877, and was buried in Oberlin.
