= Shenandoah (musical) =

1974 Broadway musical

- Original Cast Recording
- Music: Gary Geld
- Lyrics: Peter Udell
- Book: Peter Udell; Philip Rose; James Lee Barrett
- Basis: 1965 film Shenandoah
- Productions: 1974 Goodspeed Opera House; 1975 Broadway; 1977 First National Tour; 1989 Broadway revival
- Awards: Tony Award for Best Book in a Musical; Tony Award for Best Actor in a Musical (John Cullum)

Shenandoah is a 1974 musical with music by Gary Geld, lyrics by Peter Udell, and book by Udell, Philip Rose, and James Lee Barrett. It is based on Barrett's original screenplay for the 1965 film Shenandoah.

== Synopsis ==
Charlie Anderson, a widower, lives with his large family in the Shenandoah Valley in Virginia, during the American Civil War. Anderson does not wish to be involved with the war because he doesn't consider it "his" war, but he is forced to take action when his youngest son Robert is taken prisoner by Union soldiers. In the course of searching for Robert, Charlie, his daughter Jenny, and some of his sons rescue Sam (Jenny's newlywed Confederate soldier husband) from a Yankee POW train. After enduring the tragedy of losing his eldest son Jacob (to a sniper) and his second eldest son James and James' wife Anne (to deserters), Charlie and the rest of the family return home, defeated. In his despair, Charlie is reminded to return to church, where he, at long last, is reunited with Robert once more.

== Original cast and characters ==
Character	Broadway (1975)	First National Tour (1977)	First Broadway Revival (1989)
Charlie Anderson	John Cullum	John Raitt	John Cullum
Ann Anderson	Donna Theodore	Jana Schneider	Camilla Scott
Jenny Anderson	Penelope Milford	Suzy Brabeau	Tracey Moore
James Anderson	Joel Higgins	Paul Myrvold	Christopher Martin
Jacob Anderson	Ted Agress	Dean Russell	Burke Lawrence
Sam	Gordon Halliday	Gordon Halliday	Tom Cavanagh
Gabriel	Chip Ford	Cal Boney	Roy McKay
Robert (The Boy)	Joseph Shapiro	Steve Grober	Jason Zimbler
Henry Anderson	Robert Rosen	Martin Meredith	Robin Blake
John Anderson	David Russell	David Russell	Stephen McIntyre
Nathan Anderson	Jordan Suffin	Robert Quigley	Nigel Hamer

== Musical numbers ==
Act I

- Raise the Flag of Dixie (Prologue) - Ensemble
- I've Heard it All Before - Charlie
- Pass the Cross to Me - Ensemble
- Why Am I Me? - The Boy and Gabriel
- Next to Lovin' (I Like Fightin') - Jacob, James, Nathan, John and Henry
- Over the Hill - Jenny
- The Pickers are Coming - Charlie
- Next to Lovin' (I Like Fightin') (Reprise) - Jacob, James, Nathan, John, Henry and Jenny
- Meditation - Charlie
- We Make a Beautiful Pair - Anne and Jenny
- Violets and Silverbells - Jenny, Sam and Ensemble
- It's a Boy! - Charlie, Jacob, James, Nathan, John and Henry

Act II

- Entr'acte - Orchestra
- Freedom - Anne and Gabriel
- Violets and Silverbells (reprise) - James and Anne
- Papa's Gonna Make it Alright - Charlie
- The Only Home I Know - Corporal and Ensemble
- The Only Home I Know (Reprise) - Corporal
- Papa's Gonna Make it Alright (Reprise) - Jenny
- Meditation II - Charlie
- Pass the Cross to Me (Finale) - Ensemble
- Freedom (curtain call) - Ensemble

== Productions ==
The play was first performed at the Goodspeed Opera House in East Haddam, Connecticut, during 1974. It then moved to the Colonial Theater in Boston for a pre-Broadway run from November 25, 1974 - December 14, 1974. It then transferred to the Alvin Theatre on Broadway beginning on January 7, 1975. where it played for a total of 1,050 performances, ending August 7, 1977, at the Mark Hellinger Theatre, which it transferred to beginning March 30, 1977, after closing on March 27, 1977, at the Alvin, to make room for Annie.

The production was directed by Philip Rose, with scenery by Chuck Murawski, lighting by Thomas R. Skelton, costumes by Pearl Somner and Winn Morton, choreography by Robert Tucker, dance arrangements by Russell Warner, musical direction by Lynn Crigler, and orchestrations by Don Walker. Michael P. Price was executive director of the Goodspeed Opera House.

The production was nominated for six Tony Awards, including Best Musical, and won two: one for Best Actor in a Musical (John Cullum) and the other for Best Book of a Musical.

Shenandoah was revived at the Virginia Theatre on Broadway, again with Cullum in the main role, on August 8, 1989, and ended September 2, 1989. It returned to the Goodspeed Opera House during 1994, featuring Marc Kudisch. A new production began on March 22, 2006, at Ford's Theatre in Washington, D.C., featuring Scott Bakula. A positive critical response and strong sales resulted in the run being extended through May 21, although Bakula left the production April 30.

Shenandoah was staged by The Serenbe Playhouse in Serenbe, Georgia in spring 2019. It featured Taylor Hicks and Rachel Potter in the cast. It received positive reviews.
