= Goodspeed Musicals =

Theatre in East Haddam, Connecticut, United States

Goodspeed Opera House
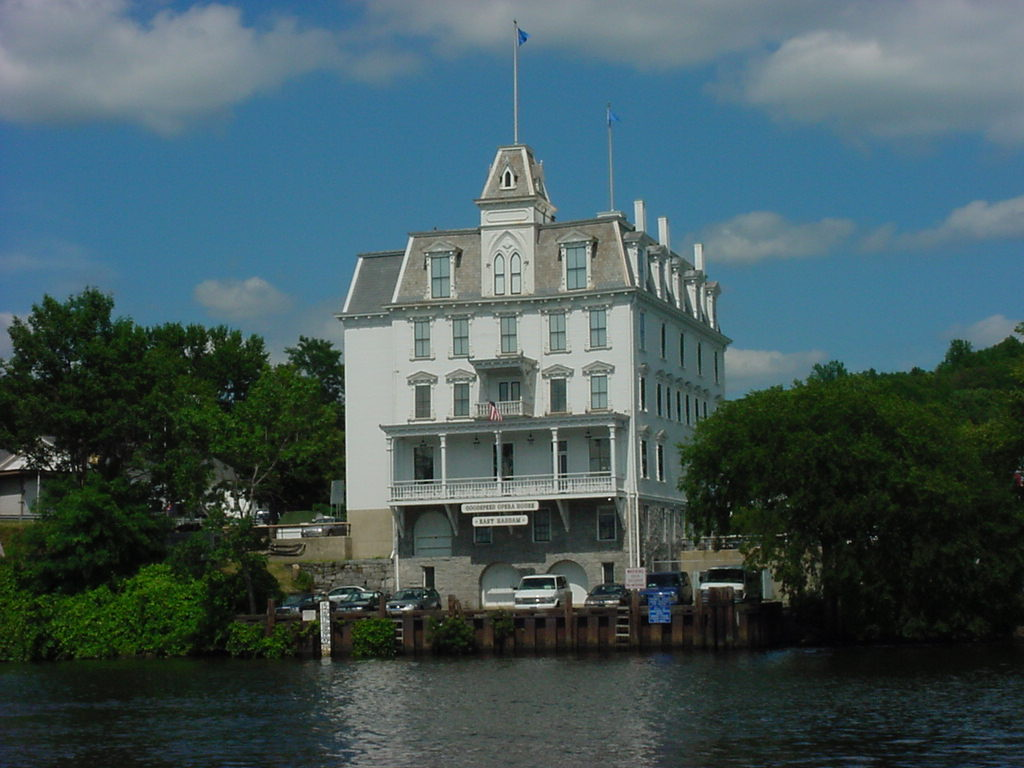
- The Goodspeed Opera House from the Connecticut River
- Interactive map of Goodspeed Opera House
- Address: 6 Main Street; East Haddam, Connecticut; United States
- Owner: Goodspeed Musicals
- Type: Regional theatre

Construction
- Opened: October 24, 1877
- Reopened: June 8, 1963

Website
- www.goodspeed.org
- Goodspeed Opera House
- U.S. National Register of Historic Places
- U.S. Historic district – Contributing property
- Coordinates: 41°27′6.33″N 72°27′45.06″W
- Built: 1876-77
- Architect: Jabez Comstock
- Part of: East Haddam Historic District (ID83001273)
- NRHP reference No.: 71000901

Significant dates
- Added to NRHP: July 30, 1971
- Designated CP: April 29, 1983

Goodspeed Musicals is a non-profit organization dedicated to the preservation and advancement of musical theater and the creation of new works, located in East Haddam, Connecticut. Its landmark Goodspeed Opera House is a distinctive feature of the view from the Connecticut River and is the birthplace of some of the world's most famous musicals, including Annie, Man of La Mancha, The Story of My Life, and Shenandoah.

Goodspeed Musicals includes the Norma Terris Theatre in Chester, as well as several writing and performing seminars. Goodspeed Musicals is considered one of the foremost regional theaters in the United States to date producing 250 musicals, over 70 world premieres, and sending 21 productions to Broadway. It is the first regional theatre organization in America to earn two special Tony Awards, one in 1980 for outstanding contributions to the American musical and a second in 1995 for distinguished achievement for a regional theatre.

== Goodspeed Opera House ==
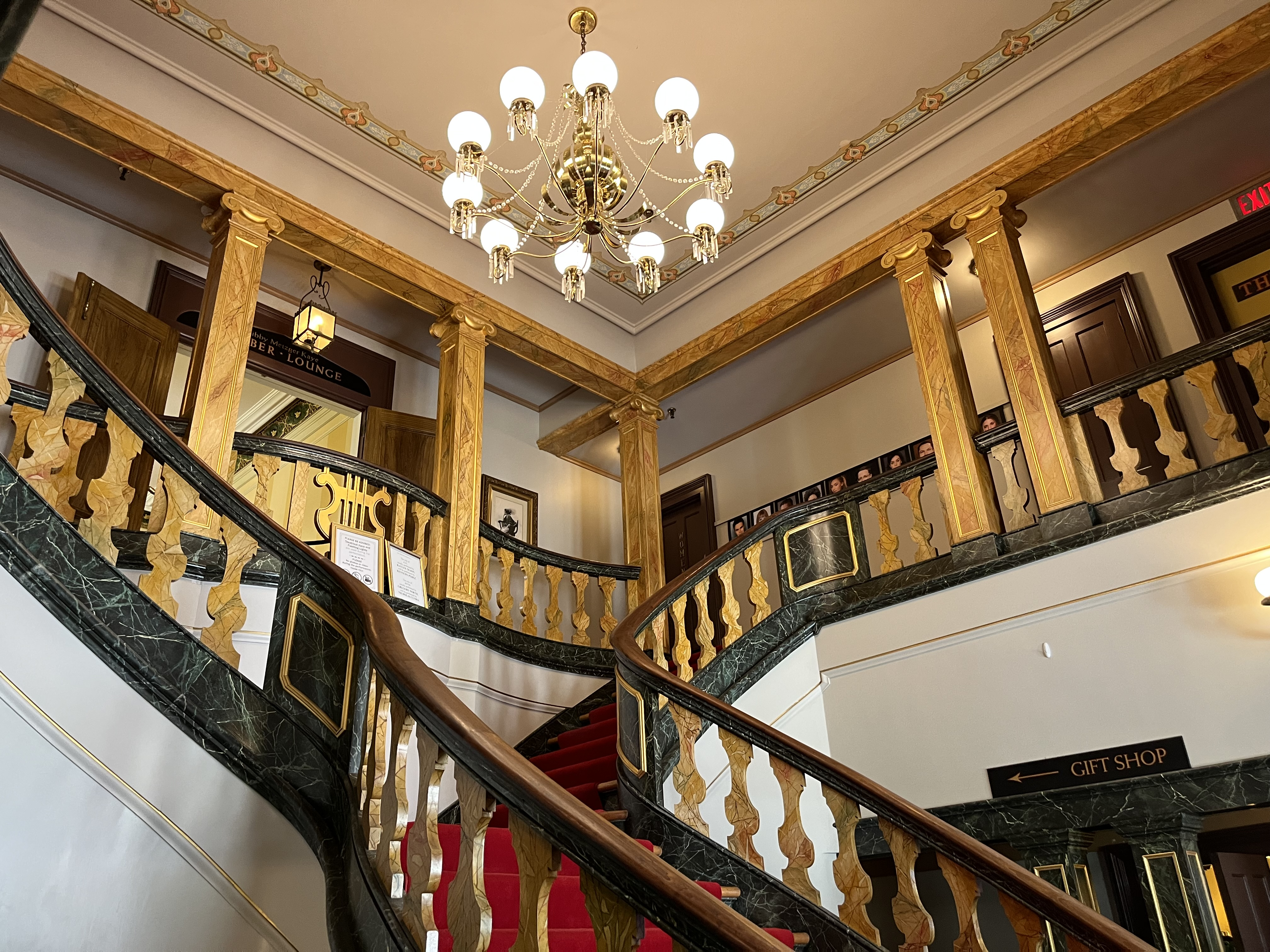
Goodspeed Opera House staircase

The Opera House was originally built by a local merchant and banker, William Henry Goodspeed. Construction began in 1876 and finished in 1877. Despite the name, it was not in fact an opera house, but rather a venue for presenting plays. Its first play, Charles II, opened on October 24, 1877. After William Goodspeed's death in 1882, the opera house fell into disrepair, facing a series of less glamorous uses—from a militia base during World War I to a general store and a Department of Transportation storage facility.

The building is unique for a theater. The theater itself is actually located on the top two floors of the building, making for interesting and sometimes difficult scenery and show load-ins. Scenery is loaded in from the dock area up a vacant shaft outfitted with a winch system to haul the scenery up to the stage level. One story told around Goodspeed is that while loading in the scenery for Annie's original world premiere, a strong gust of wind took a large piece of scenery out of the hands of the loaders and blew it into the Connecticut River.

== Goodspeed Musicals ==
Goodspeed Musicals was formed in 1959 by a group of concerned citizens after the state of Connecticut had condemned the building. The state agreed to sell the building to the group for one dollar, provided they acquire enough funding to restore and maintain it. The restoration project took nearly four years, and the Goodspeed Opera House was rededicated on June 8, 1963. In 1968, under the direction of Michael P. Price, the first performance in the new opera house was Oh, Lady! Lady! Since then, Goodspeed Musicals hassent 19 productions to Broadway. Goodspeed productions have won more than a dozen Tony Awards, while Goodspeed Musicals itself has won two special Tonys, one for outstanding contributions to American Musicals and the other for outstanding achievement by a regional theatre.

Michael P. Price served as artistic director from 1968 to 2014 and was replaced by Michael Gennaro from 2014 to 2020. In 2019, the Goodspeed announced that musical director of over 28 years, Michael O'Flaherty would be replaced by Adam Souza. In January 2021, Goodspeed Musicals announced Donna Lynn Hilton as its new artistic director and David Byrd as its new managing director. In May 2025, Goodspeed Musicals announced Vanessa Logan as its new managing director.

Goodspeed Musicals also pursues its mission through the Max Showalter Center for Education in Musical Theatre, which offers internships and new writers' residency programs. Their Arts Education Collaboration provides art-education programs for underserved Connecticut youth. Goodspeed's annual Festival of New Musicals features students from the Hartt School and the Boston Conservatory performing staged readings of new musicals, seminars, a symposium and cabaret performances. Each winter, Goodspeed also hosts the Johnny Mercer Foundation Writers Grove, a retreat for theater writers. Critic fellows from the Eugene O'Neill Theater Center in Waterford, Connecticut travel to the Goodspeed each summer to practice reviewing full productions.

Goodspeed Musicals is also home to the Scherer Library of Musical Theatre, which houses the largest musical theatre research facility in the United States. They have also built state-of-the-art production facilities including scenery shops, costume shops and a large costume storage facility. Goodspeed Costume Rentals houses the premier costume collection on the East Coast. More than 500,000 items are available to rent for professional and amateur productions, featuring costumes from Tony-winning Broadway designers such as William Ivey Long, Gregg Barnes, Catherine Zuber, Willa Kim, Florence Klotz, Linda Cho, and Anthony Powell.

Tours of many of the Goodspeed facilities can be scheduled in advance for a small fee. Tickets to the opera house or theatre productions should be ordered in advance as most performances in the relatively small theater sell-out quickly.

== Norma Terris Theatre ==
In 1984, Goodspeed Musicals added a second performance venue, the Norma Terris Theatre, in nearby Chester, Connecticut, occasionally referred to as the Goodspeed-At-Chester. While the main stage presents a mixture of revivals and new musicals as part of its four-production season, the Norma Terris presents exclusively new musicals each season. Several original musicals debuted there or at the opera house before going on to Broadway and winning Tony Awards.

== See also ==
- National Register of Historic Places listings in Middlesex County, Connecticut
