= The Joker Went Wild =

Single by Brian Hyland

from the album The Joker Went Wild Run Run Look and See
- B-side: "I Can Hear the Rain"
- Released: June 1966
- Genre: Pop
- Length: 2:39
- Label: Philips; 40377
- Songwriter: Bobby Russell
- Producers: Snuff Garrett, Leon Russell

Brian Hyland singles chronology
| "3000 Miles" (February 1966) | "The Joker Went Wild" (1966) | "Run, Run, Look and See" (October 1966) |

"The Joker Went Wild" is a song written by Bobby Russell and performed by Brian Hyland. In 1966, the track reached #20 on the Billboard Hot 100.

It was featured on his 1966 album, The Joker Went Wild Run Run Look and See.
