= Take My Hand, Precious Lord =

Song written and composed by Thomas A. Dorsey

"Take My Hand, Precious Lord" (a.k.a. "Precious Lord, Take My Hand") is a gospel song with lyrics by Thomas A. Dorsey. The music to the song was adapted by Dorsey from George N. Allen's hymn tune "Maitland". Dorsey's familiarity with this tune was through the Protestant hymn "Must Jesus Bear the Cross Alone" which used a 1693 text by Thomas Shepherd. This text was set to the tune of "Maitland" by Allen in 1844.

== History ==
Dorsey wrote the lyrics to "Take My Hand, Precious Lord" in response to his inconsolable bereavement at the deaths of his wife, Nettie Harper, and his infant son in August 1932. Nettie died while giving birth to their child. Their son died two days after being born. The protestant hymn "Must Jesus Bear the Cross Alone" became Dorsey's inspiration for the music to the song. This hymn used a 1693 text by Thomas Shepherd but with an 1844 musical setting composed by George Nelson Allen known separately as "Maitland". Dorsey's account of the creation of "Precious Lord" was filmed for the 1982 gospel music documentary Say Amen, Somebody.

An early recording of "Take My Hand, Precious Lord" was made on February 16, 1937, by the Heavenly Gospel Singers (Bluebird B6846). "Take My Hand, Precious Lord" was first published in 1938. "Take My Hand, Precious Lord" is published in more than 40 languages.

== Performances ==
It was Martin Luther King Jr.'s favorite song, and he often invited gospel singer Mahalia Jackson to sing it at civil rights rallies to inspire crowds; at his request she sang it at his funeral in April 1968. King's last words before his assassination was a request for musician Ben Branch to play it at a service he was due to attend that night. King's exact last words were "Ben, make sure you play 'Take My Hand, Precious Lord' in the meeting tonight. Play it real pretty." Opera singer Leontyne Price sang it at the state funeral of President Lyndon B. Johnson in January 1973, and Aretha Franklin sang it at Mahalia Jackson's funeral in 1972. Franklin also recorded a live version of the song for her album Amazing Grace (1972) as a medley with "You've Got a Friend". It was sung by Nina Simone at the Westbury Music Fair on April 7, 1968, three days after King's assassination. That evening was dedicated to him and recorded on the album 'Nuff Said!. It was also performed by Ledisi in the movie and soundtrack for Selma in which Ledisi portrays Mahalia Jackson. It was also performed by Beyoncé at the 57th Annual Grammy Awards on February 8, 2015. Dave Grohl recited the lyrics of the song at a remembrance service for his friend, Lemmy from Motörhead, in January 2016.

== Recordings ==
Many notable musicians have recorded "Take My Hand, Precious Lord". It was recorded by Mahalia Jackson on Tuesday March 27, 1956, on the album Bless This House (Columbia Records CL 899) with The Fall-Jones Ensemble: Mildred Falls (piano), Ralph Jones (organ).

- 1938: Selah Jubilee Singers (Decca 7598)
- 1939: The Soul Stirrers (Down Beat 103)
- 1941: Sister Rosetta Tharpe (Decca 8610)
- 1954: The Blind Boys Of Alabama on Oh Lord, Stand By Me (Speciality)
- 1954: Little Jimmy Dickens on Old Country Church (Columbia)
- 1956: Mahalia Jackson on Bless This House (Columbia)
- 1956: Aretha Franklin on Songs of Faith
- 1957: Elvis Presley on Elvis' Christmas Album (RCA Victor)
- 1961: Blind Connie Williams
- 1962: Jim Reeves on We Thank Thee (RCA Victor)
- 1963: Ralph Carmichael on Hymns at Sunset (Capitol, re-released in 1972 on Light Records)
- 1982: Al Green on Precious Lord (Grammy winner)
- 1984: Denny Correll on Golden Hymns (DC Records)
- 1973 Link Wray on Beans and Fatback (Virgin)
- 2014: Ledisi from Selma
- 2017: Dee Dee Bridgewater on Memphis... Yes, I'm Ready
- 2019: Kimbra on Offering, 2019 charity album
- 2023: Kristin Hayter on Saved!

== Accolades ==
"Take My Hand, Precious Lord" was inducted into the Christian Music Hall of Fame in 2007. It was also included in the list of Songs of the Century, by the Recording Industry Association of America and the National Endowment for the Arts. In 2012, Mahalia Jackson's recording of "Precious Lord, Take My Hand" was honored with the Grammy Hall of Fame Award.

In June 2026, CBS News included the song in its list of the 250 essential American songs of the past 250 years.
