= Norma Terris Theatre =

Connecticut Theatre

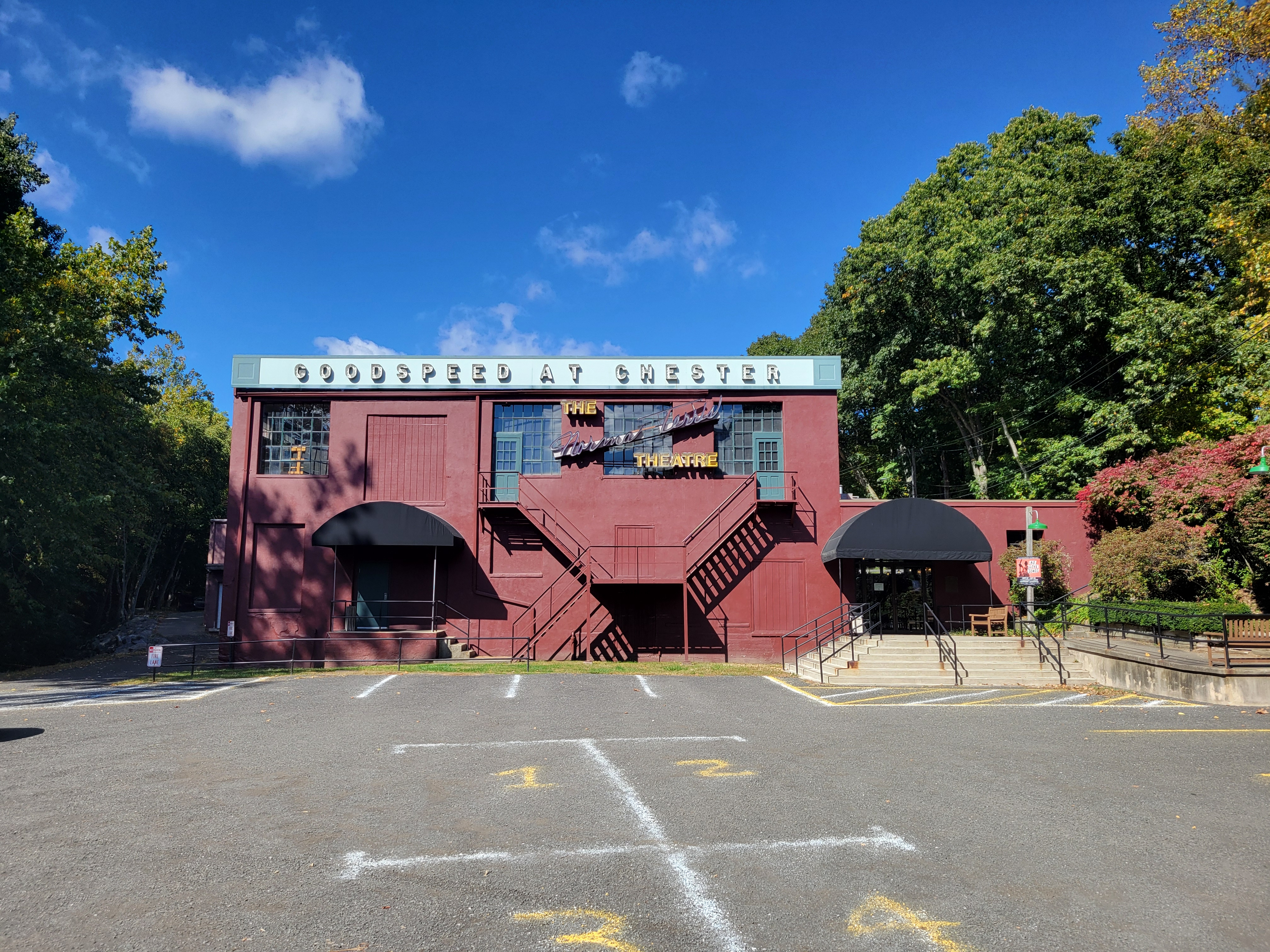
- Norma Terris Theatre
- Interactive map of Norma Terris Theatre
- Address: 33 North Main Street; Chester, Connecticut; United States
- Coordinates: 41.4054°N 72.4533°W
- Owner: Goodspeed Musicals
- Type: Regional theatre

Construction
- Opened: 1984

Website
- www.goodspeed.org

The Norma Terris Theatre is a theatre in Chester, Connecticut, and the second stage of Goodspeed Musicals. The theatre is dedicated to developing and presenting new musicals.

Dedicated in 1984, the theatre is named in honor of the actress Norma Terris, star of Jerome Kern’s Show Boat and a patron and trustee of the Goodspeed Opera House during her later years. She presided over the dedication of the Norma Terris Theatre, and in 1987 she established The Norma Terris Fund to develop the careers of new actors and to promote musical theatre.

The Norma Terris Theatre was built as a knitting needle factory in the early 1900s for Susan Bates, Inc. In 1982, after locating to a larger facility, Susan Bates, Inc. donated its abandoned factory in Chester, Connecticut to Goodspeed Musicals. A 200-seat performing space, it opened on July 10, 1984 with the new musical Harrigan ’N Hart.
