= Philip Rose (theatrical producer) =

American theatrical producer (1921–2011)

- Born: Philip Rosenberg; July 4, 1921; New York City, U.S.
- Died: May 31, 2011 (aged 89); Englewood, New Jersey, U.S.
- Occupation: Producer
- Spouse: Doris Belack (m. 1946)

Philip Rose (July 4, 1921 – May 31, 2011) was a Broadway theatrical producer of such productions as A Raisin in the Sun, The Owl and the Pussycat, Does a Tiger Wear a Necktie?, Purlie, and Shenandoah. His work was particularly notable for its social insight and distinctive social conscience.

== Art and social justice ==
Philip Rose was born Philip Rosenberg on the Lower East Side of Manhattan, to Russian Jewish parents. As a young man, he earned money singing at weddings and funerals and later worked briefly as a bill collector. His family moved to Washington, D.C. during the Great Depression and he began working at 16 for many of the local stores in the area.

While working in mostly black neighborhoods, he ended up going into people's homes and was accepted by some of the families forming personal friendships. It was there that he learned about Gospel music and Jazz. Washington, D.C., at the time, was a segregated city, but he found ways to spend time with friends he made there. He attributed this experience with segregation as having changed his life. His father, Max Rosenberg, always expressed himself differently on racial matters than the people in the neighborhood. He was very critical of racism and this made a lasting impression on the young Rose.

In 1945, after arriving in New York City, Philip Rose toured with an opera company. He was in a Gilbert & Sullivan company in Greenwich Village where he met his wife, actress Doris Belack. Shortly afterward, he began touring for a whole season doing musicals. Rose went to Harlem and began to sing jazz. He became instantly involved in the Civil Rights Movement. While in Harlem, he got to know struggling black artists including William Marshall, who was one of the few black actors to have a career. Marshall was among the artists who Rose invited to his apartment for a meeting concerning the Mississippi lynching of Emmett Till. When he decided to produce A Raisin in the Sun for Broadway, the first person he called was Sidney Poitier, not just because he wanted him to play the lead, but also because he had no idea where to begin in the casting process. Poitier got an attorney for him, and assisted him in the whole process. The two remained good friends until Rose's death.

== Struggle against racism ==
Philip Rose, in his work and his life, struggled against racism and discrimination in all its multifarious forms and disguises. He observed that though racism has been extant in numerous contexts, it began in America as a business proposition: Slavery. The social consciousness of the work he has produced reflects his own perceptive, empathic consciousness.

In two anecdotes relating to Raisin in the Sun, he pointed out that in 1959, the year the play was first produced, there was a man seated in the best seat in the house (fourth row center). This man asked at intermission to change his seat. There did not appear to be a problem with the seat and the house was completely sold out. The man was permitted to stand in the back of the theater. Rose went to the man's seat and noticed that there was a black couple on either side of the seat he had occupied. This man preferred to stand at the back of the theater for the entire performance rather than in the best seat in the house situated between two black couples, an interesting commentary on the irrationality of prejudice.

Also, while Raisin in the Sun was touring Washington D.C. Near the end of the play, Walter Lee Younger says:

"We have decided to move into our house because my father — my father — he earned it for us brick by brick.".

== Innovation and diversity on Broadway ==
Philip Rose was honored in 1995 with the Actors' Equity Rosetta Lenoire Award for "being an innovator in the theater" and for showcasing "a vast and rich array of actors and playwrights and for exposing Broadway audiences to a world of diversity." In Ossie Davis' Purlie Victorious and the musical Purlie, the issue was racism; In Shenandoah, the issue was war; in Sun Flower, the issue was women's rights; and in My Old Friends, the issue was old age.

Rose was an innovator in non-traditional casting too. In 1964, he cast the black actress Diana Sands opposite Alan Alda in the two-character comedy/love story The Owl and the Pussycat. When fellow producer Alexander Cohen requested that the script be rewritten for Diana Sands, Rose stated, "She's doing it exactly as it is written — a woman who falls in love." After the opening, Cohen acknowledged, "I was all wrong." The Owl and the Pussycat became a Broadway hit, running for 428 performances.

== Death ==
Philip Rose died in Englewood, New Jersey on May 31, 2011, aged 89. His wife, actress Doris Belack died later that year, on October 4, 2011.

== Theatrical credits ==
=== Productions ===
- The Cemetery Club [Original, Play, Comedy]

Produced by Philip Rose; Executive Producer: Philip Rose May 15, 1990 - Jul 1, 1990

- Truly Blessed [Original, Musical]

Produced by Philip Rose; Executive Producer: Philip Rose April 22, 1990 - May 20, 1990

- Shenandoah [Revival, Musical]

Directed by Philip Rose; Book by Philip Rose August 8, 1989 - September 2, 1989

- Checkmates [Original, Play, Comedy]

Produced by Philip Rose August 4, 1988 - December 31, 1988

- Late Nite Comic [Original, Musical]

Directed by Philip Rose October 15, 1987 - October 17, 1987

- Amen Corner [Original, Musical]

Directed by Philip Rose; Associate Produced by Philip Rose; Book by Philip Rose November 10, 1983 - December 4, 1983

- Comin' Uptown [Original, Musical]

Directed by Philip Rose; Book by Philip Rose Dec 20, 1979 - Jan 27, 1980

- My Old Friends [Original, Musical]

Directed by Philip Rose Apr 12, 1979 - May 27, 1979

- Angel [Original, Musical]

Directed by Philip Rose; Produced by Philip Rose May 10, 1978 - May 13, 1978

- The Trip Back Down [Original, Play]

Produced by Philip Rose Jan 4, 1977 - Mar 5, 1977

- Kings [Original, Special, Dance, Drama]

Produced by Philip Rose Sep 27, 1976 - Oct 18, 1976

- Shenandoah [Original, Musical]

Directed by Philip Rose; Produced by Philip Rose; Book by Philip Rose Jan 7, 1975 - Aug 7, 1977

- Purlie [Revival, Musical, Comedy]

Directed by Philip Rose; Produced by Philip Rose; Book by Philip Rose Dec 27, 1972 - Jan 7, 1973

- Purlie [Original, Musical, Comedy]

Directed by Philip Rose; Produced by Philip Rose; Book by Philip Rose March 15, 1970 - November 6, 1971

- Does a Tiger Wear a Necktie? [Original, Play]

Produced by Philip Rose Feb 25, 1969 - Mar 29, 1969

- The Ninety Day Mistress [Original, Play]

Directed by Philip Rose; Produced by Philip Rose Nov 6, 1967 - Nov 25, 1967

- Nathan Weinstein, Mystic, Connecticut [Original, Play, Comedy]

Produced by Philip Rose Feb 25, 1966 - Feb 26, 1966

- The Owl and the Pussycat [Original, Play, Comedy]

Produced by Philip Rose Nov 18, 1964 - Nov 27, 1965

- Cafe Crown [Original, Musical, Comedy]

Produced by Philip Rose Apr 17, 1964 - Apr 18, 1964

- Nobody Loves an Albatross [Original, Play, Comedy]

Produced by Philip Rose Dec 19, 1963 - Jun 20, 1964

- The Heroine [Original, Play]

Produced by Philip Rose Feb 19, 1963 - Mar 9, 1963

- Bravo Giovanni [Original, Musical]

Produced by Philip Rose May 19, 1962 - Sep 15, 1962

- Purlie Victorious [Original, Play, Comedy]

Produced by Philip Rose Sep 28, 1961 - May 12, 1962

- Semi-Detached [Original, Play]

Produced by Philip Rose Mar 10, 1960 - Mar 12, 1960

- A Raisin in the Sun [Original, Play, Drama]

Produced by Philip Rose Mar 11, 1959 - Jun 25, 1960

== Filmography ==
=== Producer, miscellaneous crew, actor, writer, self producer ===
- 1980s
  - A Raisin in the Sun (1961) (producer/stage production)
- 1960s
  - Purlie (1981) (TV) (producer)

=== Miscellaneous crew ===
- 1970s
  - The Owl and the Pussycat (1970) (presenter: stage production)
- 1960s
  - Gone Are the Days! (1963) (producer: original stage production) ... aka Purlie Victorious ... aka The Man from C.O.T.T.O.N. (USA: reissue title)

=== Actor ===
- White Hunter . ... McKimba (1 episode, "The Squire of the Serengeti", 1957)
- Across the Bridge (1957) (uncredited)

=== Writer ===
- Purlie (1981) (TV) (play Purlie Victorious)

=== Self ===
- American Masters . ... Himself - Producer A Raisin in the Sun (1 episode, 2000)
- Sidney Poitier: "One Bright Light" (2000) TV Episode . ... Himself - Producer A Raisin in the Sun
