= Newman's Law =

1974 film by Richard T. Heffron

- 1986 VHS cover
- Directed by: Richard T. Heffron (as Richard Heffron)
- Written by: Anthony Wilson
- Produced by: Richard Irving
- Starring: George Peppard
- Cinematography: Vilis Lapenieks
- Edited by: John J. Dumas (as John Dumas)
- Music by: Robert Prince
- Color process: Technicolor
- Production company: Universal Pictures
- Distributed by: Universal Pictures
- Release date: August 21, 1974
- Running time: 98 minutes
- Country: United States
- Language: English

Newman's Law is a 1974 American crime film directed by Richard T. Heffron and starring George Peppard.

== Plot ==
Vince Newman (George Peppard), a hard-nosed Los Angeles cop, is loyal to his partner Garry (Roger Robinson), devoted to his family and far too principled to take a bribe. So when he gets booted from duty after being falsely accused of extortion, he decides to go rogue and keep investigating an organized crime case he was working on. As he digs deeper, he stumbles upon a conspiracy that might extend beyond the local mob scene, perhaps even to the highest reaches of his own department.

== Cast ==
- George Peppard as Vince Newman
- Roger Robinson as Garry
- Eugene Roche as Reardon
- Gordon Pinsent as Jack Eastman
- Abe Vigoda as John Dellanzia
- Louis Zorich as Frank Lo Falcone
- Michael Lerner as Frank Acker
- Victor Campos as Pete Jimenez
- Mel Stewart as Quist
- Jack Murdoch as Beutel
- David Spielberg as Hinney
- Teddy Wilson as Jaycee (as Theodore Wilson)
- Pat Anderson as Sharon
- Regis Cordic as Clement (as Regis J. Cordic)
- Marlene Clark as Edie
- Kip Niven as Assistant Coroner
- Richard Bull as Immigration Man
- Howard Platt as Spink
- Dick Balduzzi as Conrad
- Penelope Gillette as Matron
- Kirk Mee as First Assistant
- Don Hanmer as Real Estate Agent
- Antony Carbone as Policeman Gino
- Jude Farese as Cop #1
- Stack Pierce as Baines
- Jac Emel as Dashiki
- Don Newsome as Ginger (as Donald Newsome)
- Titos Vandis as Grainie
- Wilbert Gowdy as Black Boy
- Louis J. DiFonzo as Pants
- Dea St. Lamont as Hooker
