= Michael P. Price =

American theatre producer

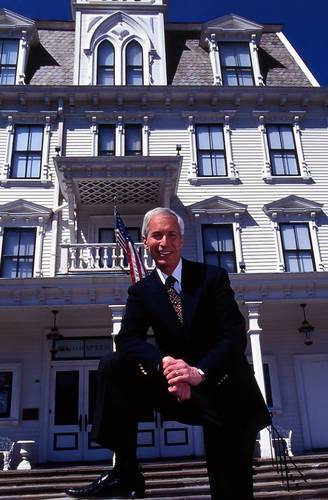
- Price in front of the Goodspeed Opera House in 2014
- Born: Michael Paul Price; August 5, 1938 (age 87); Chicago, Illinois, U.S.
- Education: Michigan State University (BA); University of Minnesota, Twin Cities (MA); Yale University (MFA)
- Occupation(s): Theatre Producer; Artistic Director
- Years active: 1960–present
- Spouse: Jo-Ann Nevas Price (m. 1971)
- Children: 2

Michael P. Price (born August 5, 1938) is the longest serving artistic director of a professional theatre in the United States. As the Executive Director of Goodspeed Musicals from 1968 to 2014, he produced more than 235 musicals, including 75 world premiers and transferred 19 productions to Broadway, including the world premieres of Shenandoah, Man of La Mancha and Annie. His productions have won 13 Tony Awards and 33 nominations. He has also accepted two special Tony Awards on Goodspeed's behalf. In 2019, he was inducted into the Theater Hall of Fame. In 2025, he received a Tony Honor for Excellence in Theatre, awarded to those who have demonstrated extraordinary achievement in theatre, but are not eligible to compete in any of the established Tony Award categories.

== Early life ==
Price was born on August 5, 1938, in Chicago, Illinois. He is the son of William and Sylvia Price, both of whom were Jewish. He was raised in a Jewish home in Chicago. He continues to strongly identify as a Jew and is active with a wide range of Jewish organizations. Price's first introduction to the theatre came from visiting family members who worked as actors. As a child, he acted in television commercials, including live commercials. He also learned from his uncle, a theatre manager in Chicago.

== Education ==
Price received a B.A. from Michigan State University. He also received an M.A. from the University of Minnesota and a Master of Fine Arts (MFA) from the Yale School of Drama.

== Early career in musical theatre ==
Early in his career, Price was a stagehand and electrician at the Shubert Theater in New Haven, Connecticut. He also served as Executive Producer of the 3,500-seat Valley Music Hall in Salt Lake City, Utah, the original stage manager for Richard Rodgers' Music Theater of Lincoln Center, and the production stage manager for Andy Williams, Henry Mancini and the Osmonds. As a lighting designer, he was responsible for the lighting at President Lyndon B. Johnson's Inaugural Gala, for Josephine Baker on Broadway and for the premiere American tour of the Hungarian National Ballet.

== Goodspeed Musicals ==
Price first joined Goodspeed Musicals for the company's first season in 1963, but left after a year. In 1968, Price returned to Goodspeed as the theatre's Executive Director—a role he held until 2014—with the goal of saving the then-struggling organization.

Over his 45 years as Executive Director at Goodspeed, Price produced more than 235 musicals, including 75 world premieres, and 19 Broadway productions. Price grew Goodspeed from a fledgling organization with only three full-time employees, a two-month season and a budget of less than $500,000 in his first season to a "musical-theater empire" with 65 year-round employees, a $12.5 million budget and a season lasting from April to December.

Under Price's leadership, Goodspeed became the only theatre ever to receive two special Tony Awards for outstanding achievement. Price accepted the first special award on Goodspeed's behalf in 1980. He accepted the second—the Regional Theatre Tony Award—in 1995. Goodspeed productions produced by Price have earned 13 Tony Awards and 33 Tony nominations.

A masthead editorial published in The Hartford Courant on January 13, 2014, credited Price's "inspired leadership" of Goodspeed for saving the institution and "making the Goodspeed a major center of musical theater."

Price's Broadway credits include:

- Man of La Mancha (1965–1971)
- Shenandoah (1975–1977)
- Very Good Eddie (1975–1976)
- Something's Afoot (1976)
- Going Up (1976)
- Annie (1977–1983)
- Whoopee! (1979)
- The Five O'Clock Girl (1981)
- Little Johnny Jones (1982)
- Harrigan 'n Hart (1985)
- Take Me Along (1985)
- Oh, Kay! (1990–1991)
- The Most Happy Fella (1992)
- Gentlemen Prefer Blondes (1985)
- Swinging on a Star (1995–1996)
- By Jeeves (2001)
- All Shook Up (2005)
- 13 (2008)
- The Story of My Life (2009)

== Government ==
Price has served as Chairman of the Connecticut Commission on the Arts and its successor, the State of Connecticut Department of Economic and Community Development's Culture and Tourism Advisory Committee since 1992 under both Democratic and Republican Governors.

== Awards ==
In addition to Tony Awards, Price has received:

- Tony Honor for Excellence in Theatre
- Honorary Doctorate in Fine Arts, honoris causa, Connecticut College
- Honorary Doctorate in Fine Arts, honoris causa, University of Hartford
- Honorary Doctorate, honoris causa, Wesleyan University
- Michigan State University College of Arts and Letters 50 Anniversary Distinguished Alumni Award
- State of Connecticut Arts Award for Service to the Arts
- Theater Hall of Fame

== Other notable positions ==
- Founder, League of Historic American Theatres
- Founding Member and Past President – National Alliance for Musical Theatre
- Treasurer, The American Theatre Wing
- Member, Tony Awards Management Committee
- Board Member, The Johnny Mercer Foundation
- Executive Committee, The Union for Reform Judaism
- Board Member Connecticut Public Television
- Board Member American Academy of Dramatic Art

== Personal life ==
Price is married to Jo-Ann Nevas Price. They have two children, Daniel and Rebecca.
