= The Four Voices =

Barbershop quartet from New York (1955–1960)

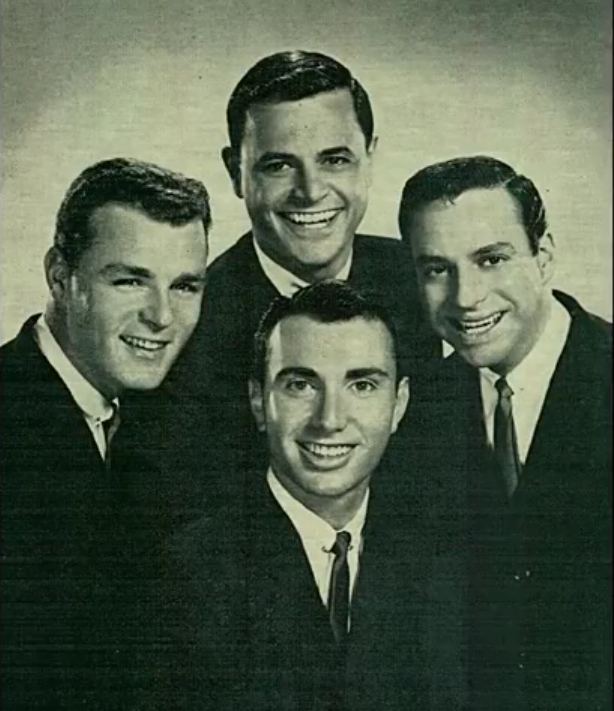

Background information
- Origin: New York
- Genres: Pop
- Years active: 1955–1960
- Label: Columbia
- Past members: Allan Chase; Sal Mayo; Bill McBride; Frank Fosta

The Four Voices were a 1950s vocal harmony quartet based in New York that issued a succession of singles on Columbia Records.

The Four Voices were Allan Chase (tenor), Sal Mayo (tenor), Bill McBride (baritone) and Frank Fosta (bass baritone). The group appeared on the Arthur Godfrey television programme, and in ice-shows and revues.

== Discography ==
- "Honest, Darling (Believe Me)" B: "Hey! Honey (Kissin' Is Free)", May 1955
- "Darling, Thanks To You", B: "The Big Eye", Oct 1955
- "Lovely One", B-side "Geronimo" Feb 1956
- "Let's Write Our Own Love Story", B: "Bim Bam Baby", May 1956
- "I'm Dreaming Of Wedding Bells", B: "The Ties That Bind", Aug 1956
- "I Love You Still", B: "Sentimental" Feb 1957
- "Such A Shame", B:Angel of Love", May 1957
- "Kingdom Of Love", B: "Sidewalk Bop", Aug 1957
- "Dancing With My Shadow", B:"Bon Bon" Dec 1957
- "Ev'ry Hour, Ev'ry Day Of My Life", B:"You Know I Do", Apr 1958
- "Tell Me You Love Me, Tell Me You're Mine", B: "Tight Spot", Aug 1958
- "Each Time You Kiss Me", B:"The Box", Nov 1958
- "Who Knows Why", B:*Who, Who, Who", Jun 1959
- "The Little White Cloud That Cried", B:"The Wang Wang Blues", Nov 1959
- "Good, Good Thing", B: "Stay With Me", Apr 1960
- "Sealed with a Kiss", B: "You're All There Is", May 1960 - possibly the final single from Columbia Records
