= Sealed with a Kiss =

1960 song written by Peter Udell and Gary Geld

Single by The Four Voices
- B-side: "You're All There Is"
- Released: May 30, 1960
- Genre: Pop
- Length: 2:03
- Label: Columbia
- Songwriters: Peter Udell, Gary Geld

The Four Voices singles chronology
"Good, Good Thing" (1960)	"Sealed with a Kiss" (1960)

"Sealed with a Kiss" is a song written and composed by Peter Udell and Gary Geld. The original recording of "Sealed with a Kiss" was by the Four Voices which was released as a single in May 1960 without becoming a hit. It first became a hit in 1962 for Brian Hyland and later Jason Donovan had an international number one hit with the song in 1989.

The lyrics are from the point of view of one of two young lovers who have had to part ways over the summer, with narrator promising to send his love and dreams in daily letters "sealed with a kiss". They also bind each other to a pledge, under seal of a kiss, that they will reunite in September.

== Brian Hyland version ==
"Sealed with a Kiss"

Single by Brian Hyland

from the album Sealed with a Kiss
- B-side: "Summer Job"; "Ginny Come Lately"
- Released: May 26, 1962
- Genre: Pop
- Length: 2:38
- Label: ABC - Paramount
- Songwriters: Peter Udell, Gary Geld

Brian Hyland singles chronology
"Ginny Come Lately" (1962)	"Sealed with a Kiss" (1962)	"Warmed Kisses (Left Over Love)" (1962)

In 1962, Brian Hyland, who often performed Udell's and Geld's material, recorded the song. Hyland recalls Geld saying the song was "based on, but not totally based on, a Bach finger exercise." (See five-finger exercise.) Hyland's single began its run on June 9, 1962, and became a top 3 hit, reaching No. 3 on both the Billboard Hot 100 and the UK Singles Chart. The personnel on the original Brian Hyland recording included Mundell Lowe, Al Caiola on guitar, Gary Geld on piano, George Duvivier on bass, Blackie Shackner on harmonica, Gary Chester on drums, and Sticks Evans and Al Rogers on percussion.

When re-released in 1975, Hyland's recording charted in the UK at No. 7. Hyland also recorded a version in German.

=== Charts ===
Chart (1962)	Peak position
UK Singles (Official Charts)	3
US Billboard Hot 100	3

Chart (1975)	Peak position
UK Singles (Official Charts)	7
Ireland (IRMA)	13

== Gary Lewis and the Playboys version ==
"Sealed with a Kiss"

Single by Gary Lewis and the Playboys

from the album Gary Lewis Now!
- B-side: "Sara Jane"
- Released: May 18, 1968
- Genre: Pop
- Length: 2:22
- Label: Liberty
- Songwriters: Peter Udell, Gary Geld
- Producer: Snuff Garrett

Gary Lewis and the Playboys singles chronology
"Has She Got the Nicest Eyes" (1967)	"Sealed with a Kiss" (1968)	"Main Street" (1968)

Gary Lewis & the Playboys covered the song in 1967 on the album Gary Lewis Now!. Their cover version of the single was a Billboard Hot 100 No. 19 hit.

=== Charts ===
Chart (1968)	Peak position
Australia	74
Canada Top Singles (RPM)	7
US Billboard Hot 100	19

== Bobby Vinton version ==
"Sealed with a Kiss"
- German 7" vinyl single

Single by Bobby Vinton

from the album Sealed with a Kiss
- B-side: "All My Life"
- Released: May 10, 1972
- Genre: Pop
- Length: 2:48
- Label: Epic
- Songwriters: Peter Udell, Gary Geld

Bobby Vinton singles chronology
"Ev'ry Day of My Life" (1972)	"Sealed with a Kiss" (1972)	"But I Do" (1972)

A third top 40 Hot 100 version came in 1972, when Bobby Vinton released his interpretation as a single. It reached No. 19 on the Billboard singles chart. This version also placed high on the Billboard Adult Contemporary chart (No. 2). Vinton arranged the song himself, with a modern sound including a unique bongo opening that made the song stand out from the other recordings. The success of the single led to Vinton releasing an album, also titled Sealed with a Kiss, that charted as a best seller. This single, which was a follow-up to "Every Day of My Life", marked a Vinton comeback in 1972, with the artist appearing on American Bandstand and other television shows on the strength of the single. Billboard ranked it as the No. 87 song for 1972.

Vinton's recording was used in both the trailer and the end credits of the 2007 horror film All the Boys Love Mandy Lane.

=== Charts ===
Chart (1972)	Peak position
Australia (Kent Music Report)	9
US Billboard Hot 100	19

== Jason Donovan version ==
"Sealed with a Kiss"

Single by Jason Donovan

from the album Ten Good Reasons
- B-side: "Just Call Me Up"
- Released: May 29, 1989
- Recorded: 1989, PWL Studios (London)
- Genre: Pop
- Length: 2:38
- Label: PWL
- Songwriters: Peter Udell, Gary Geld
- Producer: Stock Aitken Waterman

Jason Donovan singles chronology
"Too Many Broken Hearts" (1989)	"Sealed with a Kiss" (1989)	"Every Day (I Love You More)" (1989)

Music video
- "Sealed with a Kiss" on YouTube

On May 29, 1989, Australian singer and actor Jason Donovan released a cover version of "Sealed with a Kiss" as the fourth single from his debut album, Ten Good Reasons (1989). Keen to diversify his sound away from the teen pop/dance material that had been his staple, Donovan told producer Pete Waterman that he wanted to record a cover with cross-generational appeal. The track was selected by Waterman and PWL promotions executive Tilly Rutherford, with Donovan admitting he was unaware of prior versions. His version went straight into the UK Singles Chart at No. 1 and stayed there for two weeks, while also reaching the top in Finland and Ireland.

=== Critical reception ===
Bill Coleman from Billboard wrote, "Dreamy rendition of the Bobby Vinton oldie has the potential to provide Aussie-bred, U.K.-based pop star with a long-awaited stateside hit." Tom Doyle from Smash Hits said, "It actually does sound like a record made in the '60s and not at all like any of the other records in the charts, which should help it get played a lot on the radio. "A future number one!" as Bruno Brookes would chirrup cheerfully."

=== Charts ===
==== Weekly charts ====
Chart (1989–1990)	Peak position
Australia (ARIA)	8
Austria (Ö3 Austria Top 40)	5
Belgium (Ultratop 50 Flanders)	2
Denmark (IFPI)	11
Europe (Eurochart Hot 100)	5
Finland (Suomen virallinen lista)	2
France (SNEP)	12
Ireland (IRMA)	1
Netherlands (Dutch Top 40)	11
Netherlands (Single Top 100)	11
New Zealand (Recorded Music NZ)	13
Portugal (AFP)	3
Sweden (Sverigetopplistan)	8
Switzerland (Schweizer Hitparade)	7
UK Singles (Official Charts)	1
Uruguay (UPI)	7
West Germany (GfK)	4

==== Year-end charts ====
Chart (1989)	Position
Australia (ARIA)	100
Belgium (Ultratop)	17
Europe (Eurochart Hot 100)	30
Netherlands (Single Top 100)	91
UK Singles (OCC)	29
West Germany (Media Control)	40

== Other notable versions ==
- In 1962, Yugoslav rock band Bijele Strijele included a Serbo-Croatian cover of the song on their EP Svi trče oko Sue, which was the first record released by a Yugoslav rock band.
- Swedish rock band the Hounds covered the song in 1967, in a version which reached number 4 on Kvällstoppen and number 2 on Tio i Topp.
- American R&B all-girl trio the Toys covered it in 1968, on the Musicor label, where it reached No. 43 on the U.S. R&B chart.
- American pop punk band Surf Punks covered the song on their 1982 album Locals Only.
