= Ginny Come Lately =

- US 7" vinyl single cover

Single by Brian Hyland

from the album Sealed with a Kiss
- B-side: "I Should Be Gettin' Better"
- Released: February 1962
- Genre: Pop
- Length: 2:45
- Label: ABC-Paramount; 10294
- Songwriters: Peter Udell, Gary Geld
- Producer: Pogo Productions

Brian Hyland singles chronology
"She's My All American Girl" (October 1961)	"Ginny Come Lately" (1962)	"Sealed with a Kiss" (May 1962)

"Ginny Come Lately" is a song written by Peter Udell and Gary Geld and performed by Brian Hyland. In 1962, the track reached #5 on the UK Singles Chart and #21 on the Billboard Hot 100.

It was featured on his 1962 album, Sealed with a Kiss.

== Other versions ==
- Adam Faith released a version of the song on his 1963 album, For You.
- The Tremeloes released a version of the song on their 1963 album, Big Big Hits of '62.
- Freddie Starr released a version of the song as a single in 1974.
