= Amen Corner (musical) =

- Music: Garry Sherman
- Lyrics: Peter Udell
- Book: Philip Rose; Peter Udell
- Basis: The Amen Corner by James Baldwin
- Productions: 1983 Broadway

Amen Corner is a musical with a book by Philip Rose and Peter Udell, lyrics by Udell, music by Garry Sherman, orchestration by Garry Sherman & Dunn Pearson and dance arrangements by Dunn Pearson & George Butcher, based on the 1954 play of the same title by James Baldwin. The score consists of mostly gospel-inspired music.

== Synopsis ==
Margaret Alexander, the pastor of a storefront church in Harlem in the early 1960s loses some of her sheen of righteousness in the eyes of her poor but devout, congregation, when her wayward jazz-trombonist husband Luke returns after many years, now ill. Luke had always been trouble, and Sister Margaret had tried to keep him out of the life of her son, David, who she wants to become pastor some day. Now David wants to see his father, and Luke claims to have changed. Meanwhile, members of the church have seen David sneaking out to bars at night. Some argue that Margaret should step down as pastor.

Margaret struggles with her feelings for her husband, who says he still loves her, and her teenaged son, David, who has lost his faith and threatens to leave home. She finally reconciles with her dying husband, which purges her of her bitterness, and finds the strength to continue her religious mission.

== Original cast and characters ==
Character	Broadway (1983)
Margaret Alexander	Rhetta Hughes
Sister Moore	Jean Cheek
Odessa	Ruth Brown
David Alexander	Keith Lorenzo Amos
Sister Boxer	Helena Joyce-Wright
Brother Boxer	Chuck Cooper
Luke Alexander	Roger Robinson

== Song list ==
Act I

- "The Amen Corner"
- "It Ain't No Fault Of His"
- "That Woman Can't Play No Piano"
- "In the Real World"
- "You Ain't Gonna Pick Up Where You Left Off"
- "In the Real World (Reprise)"
- "We Got a Good Thing Goin'"
- "Heat Sensation"
- "Everytime We Call It Quits"

Act II

- "Somewhere Close By"
- "Leanin' on the Lord"
- "I'm Already Gone"
- "Love Dies Hard"
- "Rise Up and Stand Again"

== Production history ==
After 12 previews, the Broadway production, directed by Rose and choreographed by Al Perryman, opened on November 10, 1983, at the Nederlander Theatre, where it ran for 28 performances. The cast included Rhetta Hughes as Margaret, Keith Lorenzo Amos as David, Roger Robinson as Luke, Ruth Brown as Odessa, Helena-Joyce Wright as Sister Boxer, Jean Cheek as Sister Moore, and Chuck Cooper as Brother Boxer. Hughes was nominated for the Tony Award for Best Actress in a Musical. The production received poor reviews.

The musical was produced in Philadelphia by the Philadelphia Drama Guild in 1986 and has been produced a number of times since.
