= The Amen Corner =

Three-act play by James Baldwin

- First edition cover
- Author: James Baldwin
- Language: English
- Genre: Play
- Publisher: The Dial Press
- Publication date: 1954
- Publication place: United States
- Pages: 144

The Amen Corner is a three-act play by James Baldwin. It was Baldwin's first work for the stage following the success of his novel Go Tell It on the Mountain. The drama was first published in 1954, and inspired a short-lived 1983 Broadway musical adaptation with the slightly truncated title, Amen Corner. In the UK, Anton Philips's production of the play at the Tricycle Theatre in 1987 was the first black-produced and directed play to transfer to the West End of London, staged at the Lyric Theatre in Shaftesbury Avenue (12 March – 30 May 1987). Phillips directed a revival of the play, again at The Tricycle, in 1999. The play was revived at the National Theatre in London in the summer of 2013.

Actress Juanita Moore was a friend of both Marlon Brando and Baldwin. She asked Brando to lend Baldwin $75 to write The Amen Corner. The Original Cambridge Players took a Los Angeles premiere of James Baldwin's The Amen Corner to Broadway at the Ethel Barrymore Theater in April 1965. Produced by Maria Cole, the production was directed by Frank Silvera, with Scenic Design by Vantile Whitfield.

Internet Broadway Database(IBDB) Broadway Cast: Art Evans, Gertude Jeanette, Amentha Dymally, Whitman Mayo, Beah Richards, Juanita Moore, Isabel Sanford, Frank Silvera and C. P. Walker. Tony Award Nominations for the production were as follows:

Beah Richards was nominated in the Best Performance by a Leading Actress in a Play category of the 1965 Tony Awards for her performance as Sister Margaret Alexander.

== Plot ==
The play addresses themes of the role of a church in an African-American family and the effect of a poverty born of racial prejudice on an African-American community.

The Amen Corner takes place in two settings: a "corner" church in Harlem and the apartment dwelling of Margaret Alexander, the church pastor, and of her son, David, and sister Odessa. After giving a fiery Sunday morning sermon, Margaret is confronted by the unexpected arrival of her long-estranged husband, Luke, who collapses from illness shortly thereafter. Their son, David, along with several elders of the congregation, learn from Luke that, while Margaret had led everyone to believe that he had abandoned her with their son years ago, it was in fact Margaret who had left a dysfunctional Luke and pursued a religious life. This information precipitates confrontations between Margaret and her son, her congregation, and her estranged husband, regarding what they perceive as the hypocritical nature of her religious convictions, and the breakup of her family.

After an important conversation with his dying father, David informs Margaret that he is leaving home to pursue his calling as a jazz musician. On his deathbed, Luke declares to Margaret that he has always loved her, and that she should not have left him. Finally, Margaret’s congregation decides to oust her, based on their perception that she unjustly ruined her own family in the name of religion. Only after losing her son, her husband, and her congregation, does Margaret finally realize that she should not have used religion as an excuse to escape the struggles of life and love, but that "To love the Lord is to love all His children—all of them, everyone!—and suffer with them and rejoice with them and never count the cost!"
