= Scott McAllister =

- Occupations: Composer, professor, musician
- Instrument: Clarinet

Scott McAllister (born 1969) is an American composer and clarinetist.

Born in Vero Beach, Florida, McAllister received a DMA from Rice University. He is particularly noted for his pieces featuring clarinet, including Black Dog (based on hard rock, particularly the music of Led Zeppelin), X Concerto, and Freebirds. McAllister currently teaches at Baylor University in Waco, Texas.
