= Elihu Parsons Ingersoll =

American pastor (1804–1887)

Elihu Parsons Ingersoll (September 20, 1804 – March 29, 1887) was an American pastor. His year-long tenure as Professor of Sacred Music at Oberlin College was the first-ever appointment of a professor of music at an American college.

Ingersoll was born in Lee, Mass., September 20, 1804. His father was David Ingersoll, and his mother was Sarah Parsons, a granddaughter of theologian Jonathan Edwards.

He graduated from Yale College in 1832. He studied for one year in the Auburn Theological Seminary, and for somewhat over a year in the Yale Divinity School, and was ordained as pastor of the Congregational Church in Woonsocket, Rhode Island, December 22, 1834. He left this charge in November, 1835, to accept a call to Oberlin College, where he spent nearly five years, in part engaged as professor of sacred music. In 1840 he removed to Michigan, with the purpose of founding there an institution similar to Oberlin; but the effects of the financial crisis of 1837 prevented the realization of his plan, and after thirteen years spent in home missionary work (chiefly at his own expense) in Michigan, he became pastor in May, 1853, of the Congregational Church in Bloomington, Illinois. In April, 1857, he resigned this position to go to Kansas in aid of the anti-slavery cause in the Kansas Territory. There he labored at his own charge in the work of the ministry, chiefly in the neighborhood of Burlingame, until 1861, when he returned to Illinois, supplying for a year the church in Elmwood, and then for five years the Congregational Church in Malden, which he left on account of health in the spring of 1868. He then returned to Kansas, to be near his children, and settled in Rosevale, now Springfield, Clay County, where he died March 29, 1887, in his 83rd year.

He married April 29, 1835, Louisa, elder daughter of Frederick Perry, of Stockbridge, Mass., who died August 29, 1836, leaving an infant son. He next married, in August, 1838, Cathaiine, daughter of the Rev. Moses Gillett, of Rome, N. Y, by whom he had eight children.

He published in 1886 Lost Israel Found (84 pp., 12mo. )

This article incorporates public domain material from the 1887 Yale Obituary Record.
