= Purlie =

Broadway musical based on play by Ossie Davis

- Music: Gary Geld
- Lyrics: Peter Udell
- Book: Ossie Davis; Philip Rose; Peter Udell
- Basis: Ossie Davis's play Purlie Victorious
- Productions: 1970 Broadway; 1971 U.S. tour 1972 Broadway revival 1975 2nd U.S. tour 1981 U.S. Television; 2004 London fringe festival 2005 Encores!

Purlie is a musical with a book by Ossie Davis, Philip Rose, and Peter Udell, lyrics by Udell and music by Gary Geld. It is based on Davis's 1961 play Purlie Victorious.

== Plot ==
Purlie is set in an era when Jim Crow laws still were in effect in the American South. Its focus is on the dynamic traveling preacher Purlie Victorious Judson, who returns to his small Georgia town hoping to save Big Bethel, the community's church, and emancipate the cotton pickers who work on oppressive Ol' Cap'n Cotchipee's plantation. With the assistance of Lutiebelle Gussie Mae Jenkins, Purlie hopes to pry loose from Cotchipee an inheritance due his long-lost cousin and use the money to achieve his goals. Also playing a part in Purlie's plans is Cotchipee's son Charlie, who ultimately proves to be far more fair-minded than his Simon Legree–like father and who saves the church from destruction with an act of defiance that has dire consequences for the tyrannical Cap'n.

== Production notes ==
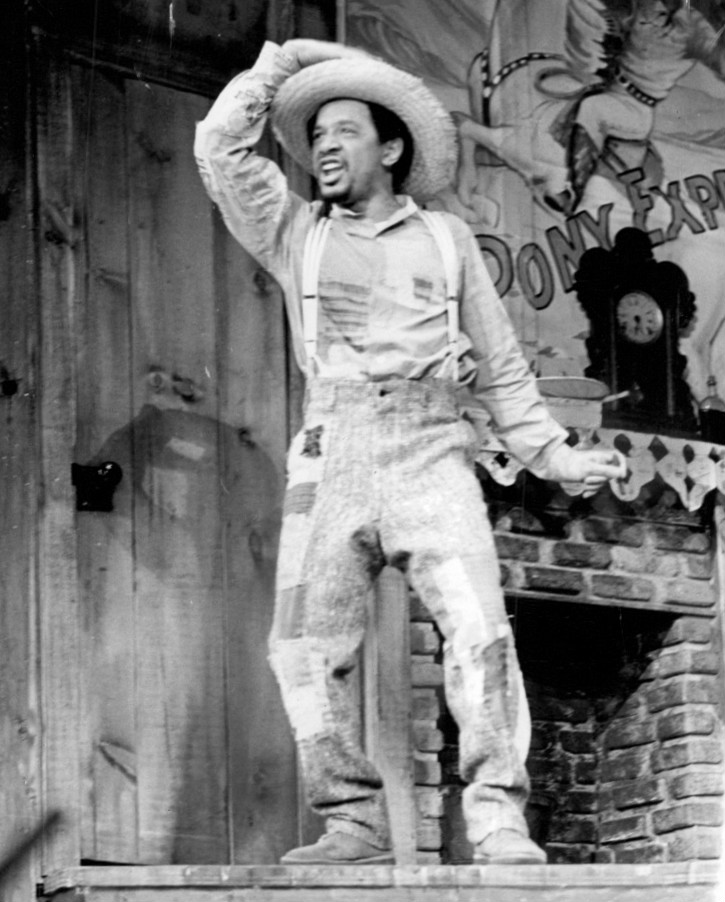
Sherman Hemsley in the 1972 production

Although Davis did not participate actively in the creation of the musical, so much of his original script was included in the final project that Peter Udell and Philip Rose felt he should share credit for the book.

After 28 previews, the Broadway production, directed by Rose and choreographed by Louis Johnson, opened on March 15, 1970, at the Broadway Theatre. It later transferred to the Winter Garden and then the ANTA Playhouse before completing its 688-performance run. The cast included Cleavon Little as Purlie, John Heffernan as Cotchipee, Melba Moore as Lutiebelle, and C. David Colson as Charlie, with Sherman Hemsley, Linda Hopkins, Novella Nelson, and Helen Martin in supporting roles. Robert Guillaume replaced Little later in the run. Johnson's choreography was nominated for a Tony Award.

The first edition of the original cast recording was released by Ampex Records; it was later re-released on RCA Victor.

A U.S. national tour, leading up to the Broadway revival, ran from November 20, 1971 to December 2, 1972. It featured Guillaume as Purlie, Patti Jo as Lutiebelle, Sherman Hemsley as Gitlow, Helen Martin as Idella, Tommy Breslin as Charlie and Art Wallace as Ol' Cap'n.

After two previews, a Broadway revival directed by Philip Rose and choreographed by Johnson opened on December 27, 1972, at the Billy Rose Theatre, where it ran for 14 performances. Guillame and Hemsley reprised their original roles, with Art Wallace as Cotchipee, Patti Jo as Lutiebelle, and Douglas Norwick as Charlie. In 1974 the musical was staged at the Virginia Museum Theatre with Nat Horne as choreographer and Albert Reyes directing.

A 1981 television adaptation for Showtime directed by Rudi Goldman starred Broadway cast members Guillaume, Moore, Hemsley, and Hopkins, with Brandon Maggart as Cotchipee, Clarice Taylor as Idella, and Don Scardino as Charlie. The production won a CableACE Award.

The first London production was a fringe theatre staging at the Bridewell Theatre in 2004. The cast included Tee Jaye as Purlie, John Lyons as Cotchipee, Victoria Wilson-James as Missy Judson, and Joanna Francis as Lutiebelle.

In 2005, Sheldon Epps directed a US national tour co-produced by the Pasadena Playhouse and the Goodman Theatre. His New York City Center Encores! staging that same year featured Blair Underwood, Anika Noni Rose, Lillias White, and John Cullum.

== Historical casting ==
Character	1970 Broadway cast	1972 Broadway revival cast	1972 1st National Tour cast	1981 Television Film	2005 Encores cast
Purlie Victorious Judson	Cleavon Little	Robert Guillaume	Robert Guillaume	Robert Guillaume	Blair Underwood
Lutiebell Gussie Mae Jenkins	Melba Moore	Patti Jo	Patti Jo	Melba Moore	Anika Noni Rose
Charley Cotchipee	C. David Colson	Douglas Norwick	Tommy Breslin	Don Scardino	Christopher Duva
Ol' Cap'n Cotchipee	John Heffernan	Art Wallace	Art Wallace	Brandon Maggart	John Cullum
Gitlow Judson	Sherman Hemsley	Sherman Hemsley	Sherman Hemsley	Sherman Hemsley	Doug E. Doug
Missy Judson	Novella Nelson	Laura Cooper	Carol Jean Lewis	Rhetta Hughes	Lillias White
Idella Landy	Helen Martin	Helen Martin	Helen Martin	Clarice Taylor	Lynda Gravatt

== Musical numbers ==
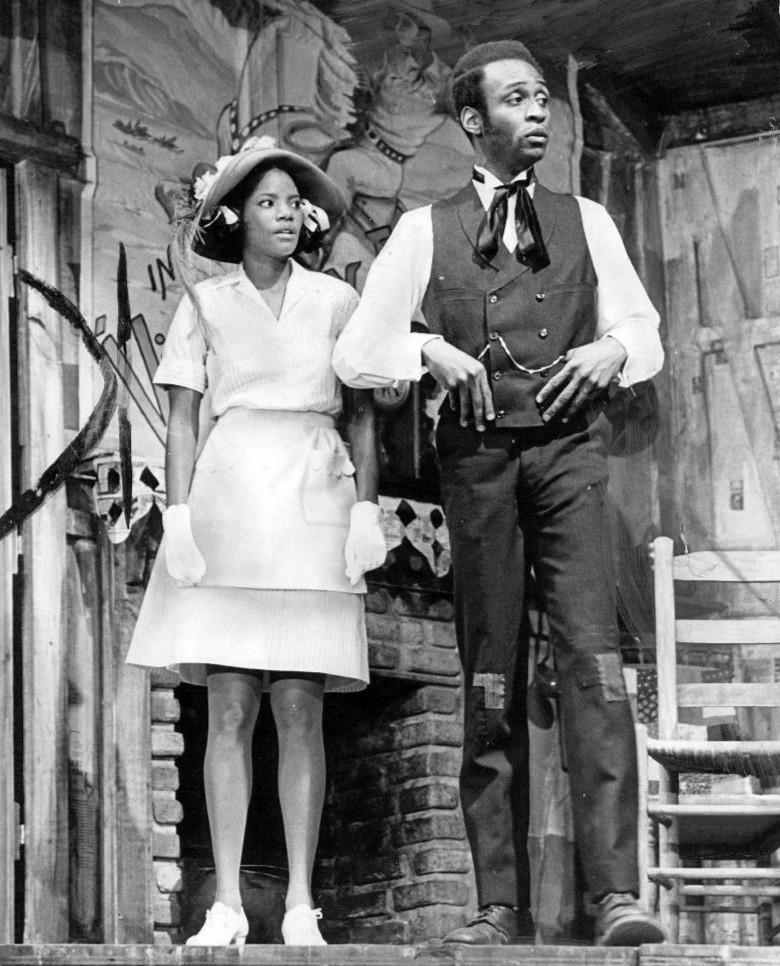
Melba Moore and Cleavon Little in the original Broadway production (1970)

Act I

- "Walk Him Up the Stairs" - Entire Company
- "Newfangled Preacher Man" - Purlie
- "Skinnin' a Cat" - Gitlow & The Field Hands
- "Purlie" - Lutiebelle
- "The Harder They Fall" - Purlie & Lutiebelle
- "Charlie's Songs: The Barrels of War; The Unborn Love" - Charlie
- "Big Fish, Little Fish" - Ol' Cap'n & Charlie
- "I Got Love" - Lutiebelle
- "Great White Father" - The Cotton Pickers
- "Skinnin' a Cat (Reprise)" - Gitlow & Charlie

Act II

- "First Thing Monday Mornin'" - The Cotton Pickers
- "Down Home" - Purlie & Missy
- "He Can Do It" - Missy & Lutiebelle
- "The Harder They Fall (Reprise)" - Gitlow, Lutiebelle, and Missy
- "The Testimony of Purlie Victorious" - Purlie
- "The World Is Comin' to a Start" - Charlie & Company
- "Walk Him Up the Stairs (Reprise)" - Entire Company

== Awards and nominations ==
=== Original Broadway production ===
Year	Award	Category	Nominee	Result
1970	Tony Award	Best Musical		Nominated
1970	Tony Award	Best Performance by a Leading Actor in a Musical	Cleavon Little	Won
1970	Tony Award	Best Performance by a Featured Actress in a Musical	Melba Moore	Won
1970	Tony Award	Best Direction of a Musical	Philip Rose	Nominated
1970	Tony Award	Best Choreography	Louis Johnson	Nominated
1970	Drama Desk Award	Outstanding Performance	Cleavon Little	Won
1970	Drama Desk Award	Outstanding Performance	Melba Moore	Won
1970	Theatre World Award		Melba Moore	Won
