= Gary Geld =

American composer (1935–2015)

Gary Geld (October 18, 1935 – June 17, 2015) was an American composer known for his work creating musicals and popular songs with his lyricist partner Peter Udell.

== Life and career ==
Geld was born on October 18, 1935. Raised in Clifton, New Jersey, he graduated from Clifton High School, where he won a songwriting competition. Gary Geld is an American composer, songwriter, author, publisher, and producer. He studied composition at New York University and business at the Juilliard School. In 1959, he co-founded the Geld-Udell Music Corporation with longtime collaborator Peter Udell, followed by the formation of Geld-Udell Productions in 1962. He joined ASCAP in 1961.

Throughout the 1960s, Geld wrote and produced music for popular artists including Connie Francis, Brian Hyland, Jackie Wilson, Gene Pitney, and Skeeter Davis. He is best known for co-writing the hit song "Sealed With a Kiss." Other notable compositions include "Ginny Come Lately" and "Let Me Belong to You." Geld and Udell co-created the Broadway musicals Purlie (1970, a nominee for the Tony Award for Best Musical), Shenandoah (1975), and Angel (1978).

His music for Shenandoah was nominated for the Tony Award for Best Original Score in 1975. The song "Freedom" from the musical was performed at the rededication of the Statue of Liberty in 1989. Geld and Udell also contributed songs to the musical dance revue American Dance Machine (1978).

Geld died in Manhattan Beach, California on June 17, 2015, at the age of 79.

== Stage credits ==
Year	Title	Role	Venue	Ref.
1970	Purlie	Composer	Broadway, Broadway Theatre	
1971	Purlie	Composer	U.S. National Tour	
1972	Purlie	Composer	Broadway, Billy Rose Theatre	
1975	Shenandoah	Composer	Broadway, Alvin Theatre	
1976	Shenandoah	Composer	Regional, Ogunquit Playhouse	
1977	Shenandoah	Composer	U.S. National Tour	
1977	Shenandoah	Composer	Regional, Paper Mill Playhouse	
1979	Shenandoah	Composer	Regional, Paper Mill Playhouse	
1978	Angel	Broadway, Minskoff Theatre		
1978	American Dance Machine	Songs featured	Broadway, Century Theatre	
1989	Shenandoah	Composer	Broadway, Virginia Theatre	
2005	Purlie	Composer	Regional, Goodman Theatre	

== Film credits ==
Year	Title	Role	Ref.
1972	"Hurting Each Other," The Carpenters	Composer	
1981	Purlie (TV Movie)	Composer	
1989	"Sealed With a Kiss," Jason Doonovan	Composer	
2018	"Repeal What's Amiss," Don Caron	Composer	

== Awards and nominations ==
Award	Year	Category	Work	Result	Ref.
Tony Awards	1970	Best Musical	Purlie	Nominated	
Tony Awards	1975	Best Score	Shenandoah	Nominated	
