= Peter Udell =

American lyricist and writer

- Born: 1934 (age 91–92)
- Origin: Great Neck, New York, U.S.
- Genre: Musical theatre
- Occupations: Lyricist, Writer
- Years active: 1960s–present

Peter Udell (born 1934) is an American lyricist and writer, best known for his collaborations with composer Gary Geld.

He started his career in popular music in the 1960s, writing lyrics for songs including "Sealed With A Kiss", "Ginny Come Lately", "Save Your Heart for Me" and "Hurting Each Other".

Udell wrote the lyrics and co-wrote the book for the Broadway musicals Purlie (1970), Shenandoah (1975), Angel (1978), Comin' Uptown (1979) and Amen Corner (1983).

He received a Tony Award for Best Book of a Musical for Shenandoah, and was also nominated for Best Original Score.
