= 28th Tony Awards =

1974 US theatrical awards ceremony

- Date: April 21, 1974
- Location: Shubert Theatre, New York City, New York
- Hosted by: Peter Falk, Florence Henderson, Robert Preston and Cicely Tyson
- Most wins: A Moon for the Misbegotten and Candide (4)
- Most nominations: Raisin (9)

Television/radio coverage
- Network: ABC

The 28th Annual Tony Awards ceremony was held on April 21, 1974, at the Shubert Theatre in New York City, and broadcast by ABC television. Hosts were Peter Falk, Florence Henderson, Robert Preston and Cicely Tyson. The theme was "Homecoming", where stars from TV and film returned to Broadway to help present the awards or perform.

== Eligibility ==
Shows that opened on Broadway during the 1973–1974 season before March 11, 1974 are eligible.

Original plays

- The Au Pair Man
- Children of the Wind
- Come Into the Garden, Maud
- Crown Matrimonial
- Find Your Way Home
- The Freedom of the City
- The Good Doctor
- Good Evening
- Here Are Ladies
- In the Boom Boom Room
- No Hard Feelings
- The River Niger
- A Song at Twilight
- Ulysses in Nighttown
- Veronica's Room
- What the Wine-Sellers Buy

Original musicals

- Cyrano
- Gigi
- Lorelei
- Molly
- Nash at Nine
- Over Here!
- Rainbow Jones
- Raisin
- Seesaw
- Sextet
- Smith

Play revivals

- Chemin de Fer
- Full Circle
- Emperor Henry IV
- Holiday
- The Iceman Cometh
- Measure for Measure
- A Moon for the Misbegotten
- Next Time I'll Sing to You
- The Play's the Thing
- Scapin
- A Streetcar Named Desire
- Three Sisters
- Uncle Vanya
- The Visit
- The Waltz of the Toreadors
- The Women

Musical revivals

- The Beggar's Opera
- Candide
- The Desert Song
- The Pajama Game

== The ceremony ==
Presenters: Alan Alda, Ed Asner, Karen Black, David Carradine, Johnny Carson, Bette Davis, Peter Falk, Henry Fonda, Elliott Gould, Ken Howard, Glynis Johns, Cloris Leachman, Michael Learned, Elizabeth Montgomery, Carroll O'Connor, Al Pacino, Suzanne Pleshette, Jane Powell, Lynn Redgrave, Esther Rolle, Marlo Thomas, Lesley Ann Warren.

Performers: Beatrice Arthur, Carol Channing, Will Geer, Joel Grey, Florence Henderson, Cleavon Little, Charles Nelson Reilly, Nancy Walker.

Musicals represented:

- Over Here! ("Over Here"/"Charlie's Place" - Patty and Maxene Andrews and Company)
- Raisin ("Whole Lot of Sunshine" - Virginia Capers/"Sidewalk Tree" - Ralph Carter)
- Lorelei ("Men" - Carol Channing, Peter Palmer and Ian Tucker)
- Good News ("You're the Cream in My Coffee" - Alice Faye and John Payne)
- Seesaw ("I'm Way ahead"/"Seesaw" - Michele Lee)
- Fanny ("Welcome Home" - Florence Henderson)
- A Mother's Kisses ("There Goes My Life" - Bea Arthur)
- Medley of Songs from Broadway Shows - Charles Nelson Reilly
- The Cradle Will Rock (Medley - Will Geer)
- George M! (Medley - Joel Grey)
- Phoenix '55 ("Upper Berth" - Nancy Walker and Men)
- Purlie ("New Fangled Preacher Man" - Cleavon Little)

== Winners and nominees ==
Winners are in bold

Best Play	Best Musical
**The River Niger – Joseph A. Walker**; In the Boom Boom Room – David Rabe; The Au Pair Man – Hugh Leonard; Ulysses in Nighttown – Marjorie Barkentin	**Raisin**; Over Here!; Seesaw
Best Book of a Musical	Best Original Score (Music and/or Lyrics) Written for the Theatre
**Hugh Wheeler – Candide**; Robert Nemiroff and Charlotte Zaltzberg – Raisin; Michael Bennett – Seesaw	**Gigi – Frederick Loewe (music) and Alan Jay Lerner (lyrics)**; The Good Doctor – Peter Link (music) and Neil Simon (lyrics); Raisin – Judd Woldin (music) and Robert Brittan (lyrics); Seesaw – Cy Coleman (music) and Dorothy Fields (lyrics)
Best Performance by a Leading Actor in a Play	Best Performance by a Leading Actress in a Play
**Michael Moriarty – Find Your Way Home as Julian Weston**; Zero Mostel – Ulysses in Nighttown as Leopold Bloom; Jason Robards – A Moon for the Misbegotten as James Tyrone, Jr.; George C. Scott – Uncle Vanya as Mikhail lvovich Astrov; Nicol Williamson – Uncle Vanya as Ivan Petrovich Voinitsky	**Colleen Dewhurst – A Moon for the Misbegotten as Josie Hogan**; Jane Alexander – Find Your Way Home as Jacqueline Harrison; Julie Harris – The Au Pair Man as Mrs. Rogers; Madeline Kahn – In the Boom Boom Room as Chrissy; Rachel Roberts – The Visit / Chemin de Fer as Claire Zachanassian/Francine
Best Performance by a Leading Actor in a Musical	Best Performance by a Leading Actress in a Musical
**Christopher Plummer – Cyrano as Cyrano de Bergerac**; Alfred Drake – Gigi as Honore Lachailles; Joe Morton – Raisin as Walter Lee Younger; Lewis J. Stadlen – Candide as Various Characters	**Virginia Capers – Raisin as Lena Younger**; Carol Channing – Lorelei as Lorelei Lee; Michele Lee – Seesaw as Gittel Mosca
Best Performance by a Supporting or Featured Actor in a Play	Best Performance by a Supporting or Featured Actress in a Play
**Ed Flanders – A Moon for the Misbegotten as Phil Hogan**; René Auberjonois – The Good Doctor as Various Characters; Douglas Turner Ward – The River Niger as Johnny Williams; Dick Anthony Williams – What the Wine-Sellers Buy as Rico	**Frances Sternhagen – The Good Doctor as Various Characters**; Regina Baff – Veronica's Room as The Girl; Fionnula Flanagan – Ulysses in Nighttown as Various Characters; Charlotte Moore – Chemin de Fer as Sophie; Roxie Roker – The River Niger as Mattie Williams
Best Performance by a Supporting or Featured Actor in a Musical	Best Performance by a Supporting or Featured Actress in a Musical
**Tommy Tune – Seesaw as David**; Mark Baker – Candide as Candide; Ralph Carter – Raisin as Travis Younger	**Janie Sell – Over Here! as Mitzi**; Leigh Beery – Cyrano as Roxana; Maureen Brennan – Candide as Cunégonde; June Gable – Candide as The Old Lady; Ernestine Jackson – Raisin as Ruth Younger
Best Direction of a Play	Best Direction of a Musical
**José Quintero – A Moon for the Misbegotten**; Burgess Meredith – Ulysses in Nighttown; Mike Nichols – Uncle Vanya; Stephen Porter – Chemin de Fer; Edwin Sherin – Find Your Way Home	**Harold Prince – Candide**; Michael Bennett – Seesaw; Donald McKayle – Raisin; Tom Moore – Over Here!
Best Choreography	Best Scenic Design
**Michael Bennett – Seesaw**; Patricia Birch – Over Here!; Donald McKayle – Raisin	**Franne and Eugene Lee – Candide**; John Conklin – The Au Pair Man; Santo Loquasto – What the Wine-Sellers Buy; Oliver Smith – Gigi; Ed Wittstein – Ulysses in Nighttown
Best Costume Design	Best Lighting Design
**Franne Lee – Candide**; Theoni V. Aldredge – The Au Pair Man; Finlay James – Crown Matrimonial; Oliver Messel – Gigi; Carrie F. Robbins – Over Here!	**Jules Fisher – Ulysses in Nighttown**; Martin Aronstein – In the Boom Boom Room; Ken Billington – The Visit; Ben Edwards – A Moon for the Misbegotten; Tharon Musser – The Good Doctor

== Special Tony awards ==
- Liza Minnelli, for adding lustre to the Broadway season
- Bette Midler, for adding lustre to the Broadway season
- Peter Cook and Dudley Moore, co-stars and authors of Good Evening
- A Moon for the Misbegotten, an outstanding dramatic revival of an American classic. Produced by Lester Osterman, Elliott Martin and Richard Hurner
- Candide, an outstanding contribution to the artistic development of the musical theatre. Produced by Chelsea Theatre Group, Harold Prince and Ruth Mitchell
- Actors' Equity Association
- Theatre Development Fund
- John F. Wharton, veteran theatrical attorney
- Harold Friedlander, the industry's foremost printing expert

=== Multiple nominations and awards ===
These productions had multiple nominations:

- 9 nominations: Raisin
- 8 nominations: Candide
- 7 nominations: Seesaw
- 6 nominations: A Moon for the Misbegotten and Ulysses in Nighttown
- 5 nominations: Over Here!
- 4 nominations: The Au Pair Man, Gigi and The Good Doctor
- 3 nominations: Chemin de Fer, Find Your Way Home, In the Boom Boom Room, The River Niger and Uncle Vanya
- 2 nominations: Cyrano, The Visit and What the Wine-Sellers Buy

The following productions received multiple awards.

- 4 wins: A Moon for the Misbegotten and Candide
- 2 wins: Raisin and Seesaw

== See also ==
- 46th Academy Awards
