= 17th Annual Grammy Awards =

1975 US music awards ceremony

- Date: March 1, 1975
- Location: Uris Theatre, New York, New York
- Hosted by: Andy Williams
- Most awards: Stevie Wonder (4)
- Most nominations: Stevie Wonder (6)

Television/radio coverage
- Network: CBS

The 17th Annual Grammy Awards were presented March 1, 1975, and were broadcast live on American television. They recognized accomplishments by musicians from the year 1974.

== Performers ==
- The Spinners - "Mighty Love"
- Marvin Hamlisch & Andy Williams - "The Way We Were"
- Les Hooper - big band performance
- Anne Murray - "A Love Song"
- Harry Chapin - "Cat's in the Cradle"
- Aretha Franklin - "Ain't Nothing Like the Real Thing"
- Stevie Wonder - "You Haven't Done Nothin'"
- Waylon Jennings - "I'm a Ramblin' Man"

== Presenters ==
- David Bowie - Best R&B Performance, Female
- Bette Midler - Album of the Year
- Paul Simon & John Lennon - Record of the Year
- Tony Orlando & Dawn - Best New Artist
- Gladys Knight & The Pips - Song of the Year
- Kate Smith - Best Pop Vocal Performance, Male
- Moms Mabley - Best Country Vocal Performance, Female
- Righteous Brothers & Aretha Franklin - Best R&B Performance by Duo or Group with Vocal

== Award winners ==
- Record of the Year
  - John Farrar (producer) & Olivia Newton-John for "I Honestly Love You" (accepted by Art Garfunkel)
- Album of the Year
  - Stevie Wonder (producer & artist) for Fulfillingness' First Finale
- Song of the Year
  - Alan and Marilyn Bergman & Marvin Hamlisch (songwriters) for "The Way We Were" performed by Barbra Streisand
- Best New Artist
  - Marvin Hamlisch

=== Children's ===
- Best Recording for Children
  - Sebastian Cabot, Sterling Holloway & Paul Winchell for Winnie the Pooh and Tigger Too

=== Classical ===
- Best Classical Performance - Orchestra
  - Georg Solti (conductor) & the Chicago Symphony Orchestra for Berlioz: Symphonie fantastique
- Best Classical Vocal Soloist Performance
  - Leontyne Price for Leontyne Price Sings Richard Strauss
- Best Opera Recording
  - Richard Mohr (producer), Georg Solti (conductor), Judith Blegen, Montserrat Caballé, Plácido Domingo, Sherrill Milnes, Ruggero Raimondi & the London Philharmonic for Puccini: La bohème
- Best Choral Performance, Classical (other than opera)
  - Colin Davis (conductor) the Ambrosian Singers, the Wandsworth School Boys Choir & the London Symphony Orchestra & Chorus for Berlioz: La Damnation de Faust
- Best Classical Performance Instrumental Soloist or Soloists (with orchestra)
  - Maxim Shostakovich (conductor), David Oistrakh & the New Philharmonia for Shostakovich: Violin Concerto No. 1
- Best Classical Performance Instrumental Soloist or Soloists (without orchestra)
  - Alicia de Larrocha for Albéniz: Iberia
- Best Chamber Music Performance
  - Pierre Fournier, Arthur Rubinstein & Henryk Szeryng for Brahms: Trios (Complete)/Schumann: Trio No. 1 in D Minor
- Album of the Year, Classical
  - David Harvey (producer), Georg Solti (conductor) & the Chicago Symphony Orchestra for Berlioz: Symphonie fantastique

=== Comedy ===
- Best Comedy Recording
  - Richard Pryor for That Nigger's Crazy

=== Composing and arranging ===
- Best Instrumental Composition
  - Mike Oldfield (composer) for "Tubular Bells - Theme From The Exorcist"
- Album of Best Original Score Written for a Motion Picture or a Television Special
  - Alan and Marilyn Bergman & Marvin Hamlisch (composers) for The Way We Were performed by Barbra Streisand
- Best Instrumental Arrangement
  - Patrick Williams (arranger) for Threshold
- Best Arrangement Accompanying Vocalists
  - Joni Mitchell & Tom Scott (arrangers) for "Down to You" performed by Joni Mitchell

=== Country ===
- Best Country Vocal Performance, Female
  - Anne Murray for Love Song
- Best Country Vocal Performance, Male
  - Ronnie Milsap for "Please Don't Tell Me How the Story Ends"
- Best Country Vocal Performance by a Duo or Group
  - The Pointer Sisters for "Fairytale"
- Best Country Instrumental Performance
  - Chet Atkins & Merle Travis for The Atkins–Travis Traveling Show
- Best Country Song
  - Billy Sherrill & Norro Wilson (songwriters) for "A Very Special Love Song" performed by Charlie Rich

=== Folk ===
- Best Ethnic or Traditional Recording
  - Doc Watson & Merle Watson for Two Days in November

=== Gospel ===
- Best Gospel Performance
  - The Oak Ridge Boys for "The Baptism of Jesse Taylor"
- Best Soul Gospel Performance
  - James Cleveland for In the Ghetto performed by James Cleveland & the Southern California Community Choir
- Best Inspirational Performance (non-classical)
  - Elvis Presley for How Great Thou Art

=== Jazz ===
- Best Jazz Performance by a Soloist
  - Charlie Parker for First Recordings!
- Best Jazz Performance by a Group
  - Joe Pass, Niels-Henning Ørsted Pedersen & Oscar Peterson for The Trio
- Best Jazz Performance by a Big Band
  - Woody Herman for Thundering Herd

=== Musical show ===
- Best Score From the Original Cast Show Album
  - Robert Brittan, Judd Woldin (composers), Thomas Z. Shepard (producer) & the original cast (Virginia Capers, Joe Morton, Ernestine Jackson, Robert Jackson, Deborah Allen & Helen Martin) for Raisin

=== Packaging and notes ===
- Best Album Package
  - Christopher Whorf & Ed Thrasher (art directors) for Come and Gone performed by Mason Proffit
- Best Album Notes
  - Charles R. Townsend (notes writer) for For the Last Time performed by Bob Wills & His Texas Playboys
  - Dan Morgenstern (notes writer) for The Hawk Flies performed by Coleman Hawkins
- Best Album Notes - Classical
  - Angus Scrimm (as Rory Guy) (notes writer) for Korngold: The Classic Erich Wolfgang Korngold conducted by Ulf Hoelscher/Willy Mattes

=== Pop ===
- Best Pop Vocal Performance, Female
  - Olivia Newton-John for "I Honestly Love You"
- Best Pop Vocal Performance, Male
  - Stevie Wonder for Fulfillingness' First Finale
- Best Pop Vocal Performance by a Duo, Group or Chorus
  - Paul McCartney & Wings for "Band on the Run"
- Best Pop Instrumental Performance
  - Marvin Hamlisch for "The Entertainer"

=== Production and engineering ===
- Best Engineered Recording, Non-Classical
  - Geoff E. Emerick (engineer) for Band on the Run performed by Paul McCartney & Wings
- Best Engineered Recording, Classical
  - Kenneth Wilkinson (engineer), Georg Solti (conductor) & the Chicago Symphony Orchestra for Berlioz: Symphonie fantastique
- Best Producer of the Year
  - Thom Bell

=== R&B ===
- Best R&B Vocal Performance, Female
  - Aretha Franklin for "Ain't Nothing Like the Real Thing"
- Best R&B Vocal Performance, Male
  - Stevie Wonder for "Boogie on Reggae Woman"
- Best R&B Vocal Performance by a Duo, Group or Chorus
  - Rufus for "Tell Me Something Good"
- Best R&B Instrumental Performance
  - MFSB for "The Sound of Philadelphia"
- Best Rhythm & Blues Song
  - Stevie Wonder (songwriter) for "Living for the City"

=== Spoken ===
- Best Spoken Word Recording
  - Peter Cook & Dudley Moore for Good Evening
