= A Raisin in the Sun =

1959 play by Lorraine Hansberry

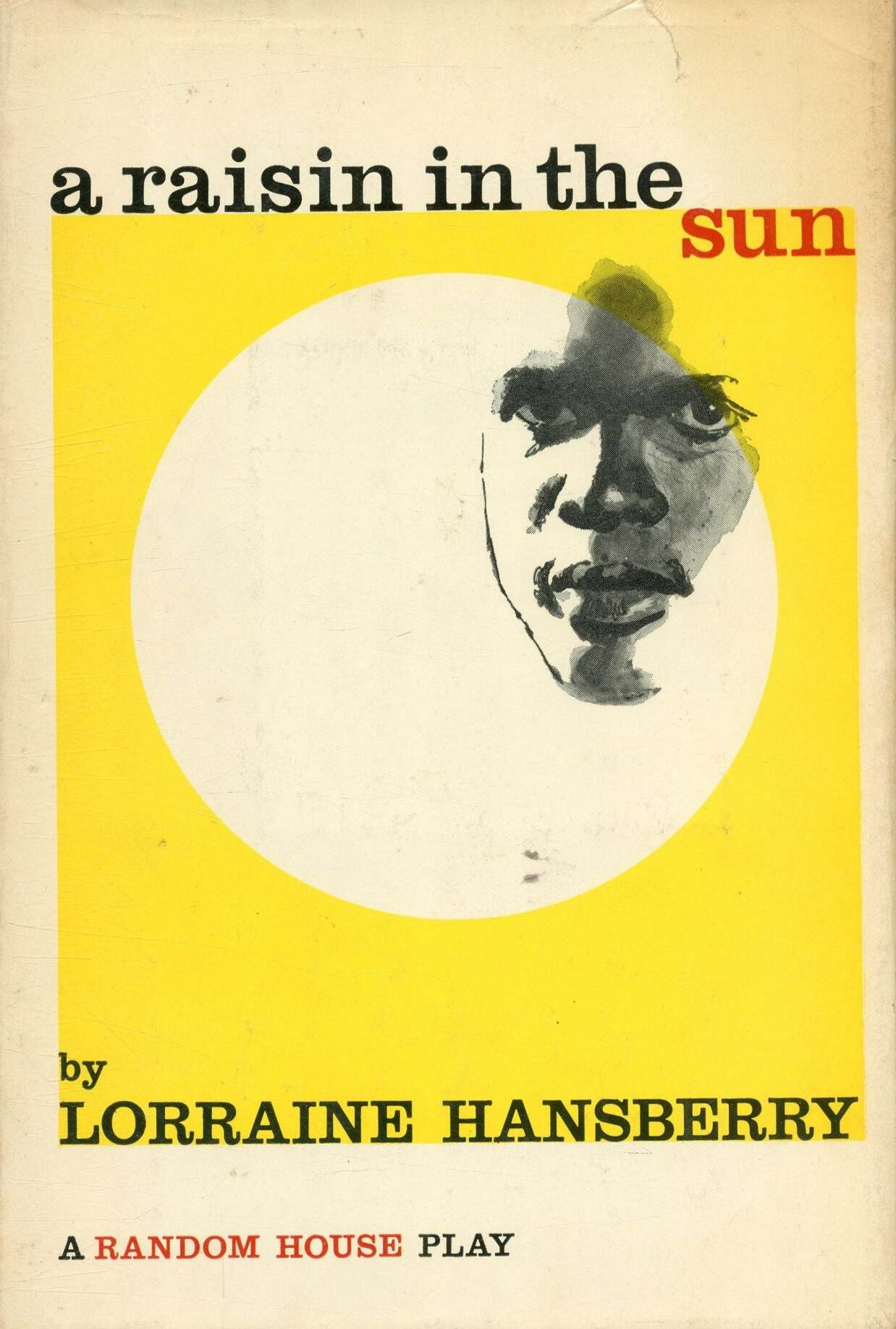
- First-edition publication (Random House 1959)
- Original language: English
- Written by: Lorraine Hansberry
- Characters: Walter Younger; Ruth Younger; Beneatha Younger; Travis Younger; Lena Younger (Mama); George Murchison; Joseph Asagai; Karl Lindner; Mrs. Johnson; Bobo; Moving Men
- Genre: Domestic drama
- Setting: South Side, Chicago

Premiere
- Date: March 11, 1959; 67 years ago
- Place: Ethel Barrymore Theatre

A Raisin in the Sun is a play by Lorraine Hansberry that debuted on Broadway in 1959. The title comes from the poem "Harlem" (also known as "A Dream Deferred") by Langston Hughes. The story tells of a black family's experiences on the south side of Chicago, as they attempt to improve their financial circumstances with an insurance payout following the death of their patriarch, and deals with matters of housing discrimination, racism, and assimilation. The New York Drama Critics' Circle named it the best play of 1959, and in the 21st century publications such as The Independent and Time Out have listed it among the best plays ever written.

== Plot ==
Walter and Ruth Younger, and their son Travis, along with Walter's mother Lena (Mama) and younger sister Beneatha, live in poverty in a run-down two-bedroom apartment on Chicago's South Side. Walter is barely making a living as a limousine driver. Though Ruth is content with their lot, Walter desperately wishes for more. He hopes to invest in a liquor store in partnership with Willy and Bobo, his street-smart acquaintances.

At the beginning of the play, Walter Lee and Beneatha's father has recently died, and Mama (Lena) is waiting for a life insurance check for $10,000. Walter has a sense of entitlement to the money, but Mama has religious objections to alcohol, and Beneatha has to remind him it is Mama's call how to spend it. Eventually, Mama puts some of the money down on a new house, choosing an all-white neighborhood over a black one for the practical reason that it is much cheaper. Later she relents and gives the remaining $6,500 to Walter to invest, with the provision that he reserve $3,000 for Beneatha's education. Walter gives all of the money to Willy, who takes it and flees, depriving Walter and Beneatha of their dreams, though not the Youngers of their new home. Bobo reports the bad news about the money. Meanwhile, Karl Lindner, a white representative of the neighborhood they plan to move to, makes an offer to buy them out. Vaguely threatening, he says he wishes to avoid tensions over the introduction of Black people into the neighborhood. Although they reject the offer at first, Walter prepares to accept it after he discovers that Willy fled with his investment, much to the horror of his family. Lena says that while money was something they try to work for, they should never take it if it was a person's way of telling them they were not fit to walk the same earth as them.

Meanwhile, Beneatha's character and direction in life are influenced by two different men who are potentially love interests: her wealthy and educated boyfriend George Murchison, and Joseph Asagai. Neither man is actively involved in the Youngers' financial ups and downs. George represents the "fully assimilated black man" who denies his African heritage with a "smarter than thou" attitude, which Beneatha finds disgusting, while dismissively mocking Walter's situation. Joseph, a Yoruba student from Nigeria, patiently teaches Beneatha about her African heritage; he gives her thoughtfully practical gifts from Africa while pointing out she is unwittingly assimilating herself into white ways. She straightens her hair, for example, which he characterizes as "mutilation".

When Beneatha becomes distraught at the loss of the money, she is scolded by Joseph for her materialism. She eventually accepts his point of view that things will get better with effort, along with agreeing to consider his proposal of marriage and invitation to move with him to Nigeria to practice medicine.

Walter is oblivious to the stark contrast between George and Joseph: his pursuit of wealth can be attained only by liberating himself from Joseph's culture, to which he attributes his poverty, and by rising to George's level, wherein he sees his salvation. Walter redeems himself and black pride at the end by changing his mind and not accepting the buyout offer, stating that the family is proud of who they are and will try to be good neighbors. The play closes with the family leaving for their new home but uncertain future.

=== The "Mrs. Johnson" scene ===
Because of time constraints and the logistics of having an additional character who only appears once, the character Mrs. Johnson and a few scenes were cut from the Broadway performance and in most subsequent productions. Mrs. Johnson is the Younger family's nosy and loud neighbor, referenced throughout the play who makes a brief appearance shortly after the Youngers buy the house in Clybourne Park. She cannot understand how the family can consider moving to a white neighborhood and cattily jokes that she will probably read in the newspaper in a month that they have been killed in a bombing. Her lines are employed as comic relief, but Hansberry also uses this scene to mock those who are too scared to stand up for their rights. In the introduction by Robert B. Nemiroff, he writes that the scene is included in print because it draws attention away from a seemingly happy ending to a more violent reality inspired by Hansberry's own experiences.

== Broadway production and reception ==
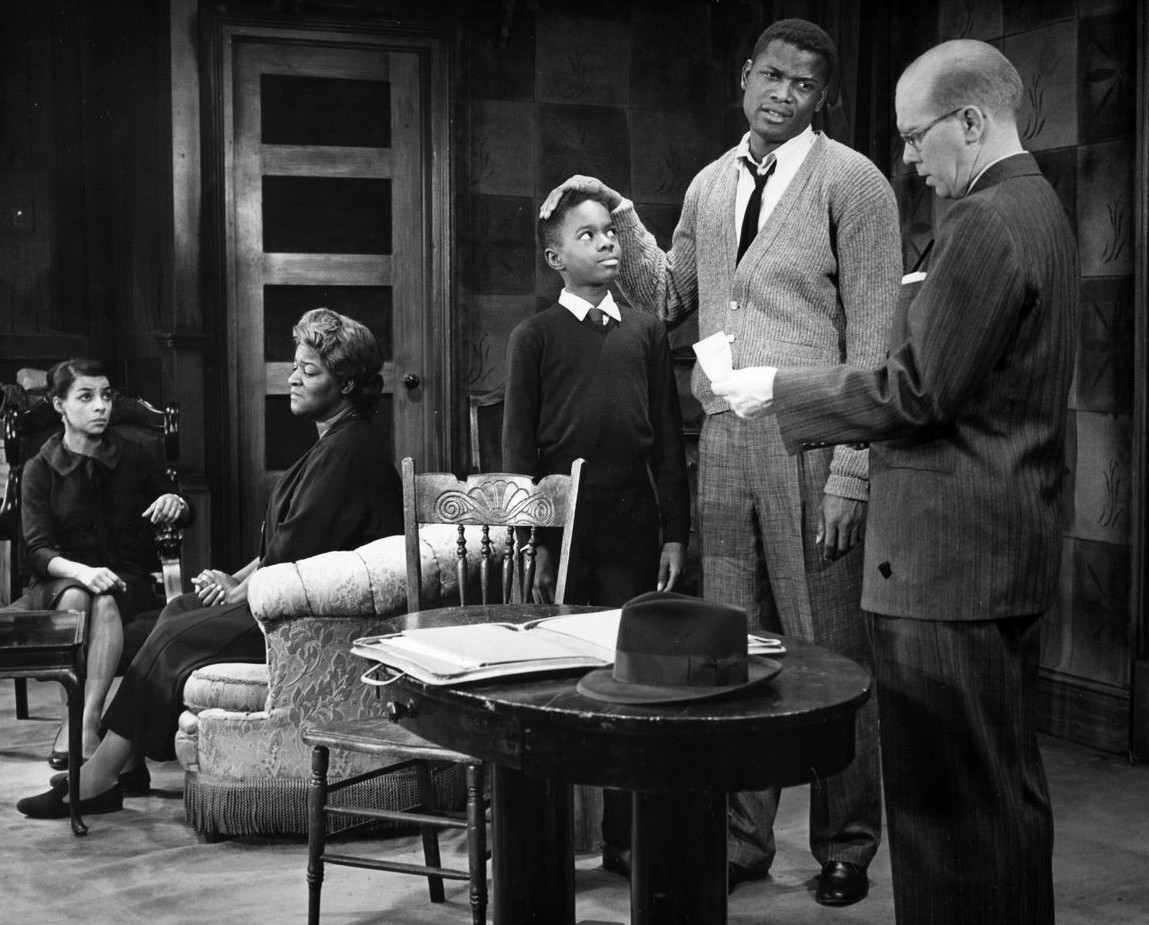
Scene from the play. Ruby Dee as Ruth, Claudia McNeil as Lena, Glynn Turman as Travis, Sidney Poitier as Walter, and John Fiedler as Karl Lindner.

With a cast in which all but one character is black, A Raisin in the Sun was considered a risky investment, and it took eighteen months for producer Philip Rose to raise enough money to launch it. There was disagreement with how it should be played, with the focus on the mother or on the son. When the play hit New York, Poitier played it with emphasis on the son and found not only his calling, but also an enthralled audience.

After pre-Broadway touring to positive reviews, (Note: Producer Philip Rose, especially credited a surprisingly, very positive review by Claudia Cassidy of its Chicago-tryout, in propelling it to become a hit.) the play premiered on Broadway at the Ethel Barrymore Theatre on March 11, 1959. It transferred to the Belasco Theatre on October 19, 1959, and closed on June 25, 1960, after 530 total performances. Directed by Lloyd Richards, the cast comprised:

- Sidney Poitier – Walter Lee Younger
- Ruby Dee – Ruth Younger
- Ivan Dixon – Joseph Asagai
- Lonne Elder III – Bobo
- John Fiedler – Karl Lindner
- Louis Gossett Jr. – George Murchison (as Louis Gossett)
- Claudia McNeil – Lena Younger
- Diana Sands – Beneatha Younger
- Glynn Turman – Travis Younger
- Ed Hall – moving man
- Douglas Turner – moving man

Ossie Davis later took over as Walter Lee Younger, and Frances Williams as Lena Younger.

Raisin in the Sun was the first play written by a Black woman to be produced on Broadway, as well as the first with a black director, Richards. Waiting for the curtain to rise on opening night, Hansberry and producer Rose did not expect the play to be a success, for it had received mixed reviews from a preview audience the night before. Some reviewers argued about whether the play was "universal" or particular to Black experience. Nonetheless, upon opening, the play won popular and critical acclaim. At opening night, after multiple curtain calls, the audience cried out for the author, whereupon Poitier jumped into the audience and pulled Hansberry onto the stage for her ovation.

Hansberry noted that her play introduced details of black life to the overwhelmingly white Broadway audiences, while director Richards observed that it was the first play to which large numbers of black people were drawn. Frank Rich, writing in The New York Times in 1983, stated that A Raisin in the Sun "changed American theater forever". In 2016, Claire Brennan wrote in The Guardian that "The power and craft of the writing make A Raisin in the Sun as moving today as it was then."

In 1960 A Raisin In The Sun was nominated for four Tony Awards:

- Best Play – written by Lorraine Hansberry; produced by Philip Rose, David J. Cogan
- Best Actor in Play – Sidney Poitier
- Best Actress in a Play – Claudia McNeil
- Best Direction of a Play – Lloyd Richards

== West End production ==
Some five months after its Broadway opening, Hansberry's play appeared in London's West End, playing at the Adelphi Theatre from August 4, 1959. As on Broadway, the director was Lloyd Richards, and the cast was as follows:

- Kim Hamilton – Ruth Younger
- John Adan – Travis Younger
- Earle Hyman – Walter Lee Younger
- Olga James – Beneatha Younger
- Juanita Moore – Lena Younger
- Bari Johnson – Joseph Asagai
- Scott Cunningham – George Murchison
- Meredith Edwards – Karl Lindner
- Lionel Ngakane – Bobo

The play was presented (as before) by Philip Rose and David J. Cogan, in association with the British impresario Jack Hylton.

== Historical background ==
What happens to a dream deferred? Does it dry up like a raisin in the sun?

— Langston Hughes (1951)

Experiences in this play echo a lawsuit, Hansberry v. Lee, 311 U.S. 32 (1940), to which the playwright Lorraine Hansberry's father was a party, when he fought to have his day in court despite the fact that a previous class action about racially motivated restrictive covenants, Burke v. Kleiman, 277 Ill. App. 519 (1934), had been similar to his situation. (This case was heard prior to the passage of the Fair Housing Act—Title VIII of the Civil Rights Act of 1968—which prohibited discrimination in housing). The Hansberry family won their right to be heard as a matter of due process of law in relation to the Fourteenth Amendment to the United States Constitution. The Supreme Court held that the Hansberry defendants were not bound by the Burke decision, because the class of homeowners in the Washington Park Subdivision had conflicting goals, and thus could not be considered to be the same class. The plaintiff in the first action in 1934 was Olive Ida Burke, who brought the suit on behalf of a property owners' association to enforce racial restrictions. Her husband, James Burke, later sold a house to Carl Hansberry (Lorraine's father), when he changed his mind about the validity of the covenant. Mr. Burke's decision may have been motivated by the changing demographics of the neighborhood, but it was also influenced by the Depression. The demand for houses was so low among white buyers that Mr. Hansberry may have been the only prospective purchaser available.

== Other productions ==
=== London, 1985 ===
In 1985, Yvonne Brewster directed a production of for the Black Theatre Co-operative, performed at the Tricycle Theatre (11 April 1985 – 4 May 1985) and at The Drill Hall Arts Centre (9 July 1985 – 20 July 1985), with the cast featuring Carmen Munroe, Gary McDonald, Peter Harding, Jacqueline de Peza, Freddie Brooks, Guy Gregory, Ella Wilder and Kwabena Manso.

=== Off-Broadway revival, 1986 ===
Roundabout Theatre Company staged a 25th-anniversary production of Raisin at the Union Square Theatre from July to September 1986, directed by Harold Scott and starring Olivia Cole as Lena, Starletta DuPois as Ruth, and James Pickens Jr. as Walter Lee, with John Fiedler reprising his Broadway and film role as Lindner. The production had a limited national tour including stops in Los Angeles and Washington, D.C., with Esther Rolle taking over as Lena and Danny Glover as Walter Lee, respectively. The production served as the basis for the 1989 PBS American Playhouse proshot, with Rolle, DuPois, Glover, and Fiedler reprising their roles.

=== Broadway revival, 2004 ===
A revival ran on Broadway at the Royale Theatre from April 26, 2004, to July 11, 2004 with the following cast:

- Sean Combs – Walter Lee Younger
- Audra McDonald – Ruth Younger
- Phylicia Rashad – Lena Younger
- Sanaa Lathan – Beneatha Younger
- Bill Nunn – Bobo
- David Aaron Baker – Karl Lindner
- Lawrence Ballard – moving man
- Teagle F. Bougere – Joseph Asagai
- Frank Harts – George Murchison
- Billy Eugene Jones – moving man
- Alexander Mitchell – Travis Younger

The director was Kenny Leon, and David Binder and Vivek Tiwary were producers.

The play won two 2004 Tony Awards: Best Actress in a Play (Phylicia Rashad) and Best Featured Actress in a Play (Audra McDonald), and was nominated for Best Revival of a Play and Best Featured Actress in a Play (Sanaa Lathan).

=== Royal Exchange, Manchester production, 2010 ===
In 2010, Michael Buffong directed a widely acclaimed production at the Royal Exchange Theatre in Manchester, described by Dominic Cavendish in The Daily Telegraph as "A brilliant play, brilliantly served". Michael Buffong, Ray Fearon and Jenny Jules all won MEN Awards. The cast were:

- Jenny Jules – Ruth Younger
- Ray Fearon – Walter Lee Younger
- Tracy Ifeachor – Beneatha Younger
- Starletta DuPois (who played Ruth in the 1989 film) – Lena Younger
- Damola Adelaja – Joseph Asagai
- Simon Combs – George Murchison
- Tom Hodgkins – Karl Lindner
- Ray Emmet Brown – Bobo/Moving Man

=== Broadway revival, 2014 ===
A second revival ran on Broadway from April 3, 2014, to June 15, 2014, at the Ethel Barrymore Theatre. The play won three 2014 Tony Awards: Best Revival of a Play, Best Performance by an Actress in a Featured Role in a Play (Sophie Okonedo) and Best Direction of a Play (Kenny Leon).

- Denzel Washington – Walter Lee Younger
- Sophie Okonedo – Ruth Younger
- LaTanya Richardson Jackson – Lena Younger
- Anika Noni Rose – Beneatha Younger
- Stephen McKinley Henderson – Bobo
- David Cromer – Karl Lindner
- Keith Eric Chappelle – moving man
- Sean Patrick Thomas – Joseph Asagai
- Jason Dirden – George Murchison
- Billy Eugene Jones – moving man
- Bryce Clyde Jenkins – Travis Younger

=== Arena Stage revival, 2017 ===
The play opened on April 6, 2017, at Arena Stage in Washington, D.C., directed by Tazewell Thompson, with the following cast:

- Will Cobbs – Walter Lee Younger
- Lizan Mitchell – Lena Younger
- Dawn Ursula – Ruth Younger
- Joy Jones – Beneatha Younger
- Jeremiah Hasty – Travis Younger
- Mack Leamon – Bobo/Asagai
- Thomas Adrian Simpson – Karl Lindner
- Keith L. Royal Smith – George Murchison

=== Off-Broadway revival, 2022 ===
A new production of the play, directed by Robert O'Hara, first played in Summer 2019 at the Williamstown Theatre Festival, starring S. Epatha Merkerson as Lena Younger. O'Hara directed the same production with a largely different cast at The Public Theater Off-Broadway in 2022, starring Tonya Pinkins as Lena Younger. The production was notable for emphasizing the danger the Youngers face in moving to Clybourne Park, a notion that was written into the script by Hansberry but most major interpretations, including the film, avoid due to undercutting a perceived happy ending. Though Hansberry biographer Imani Perry claims this interpretation was the "closest to Lorraine's vision that I have ever seen", the production was criticized for this ending by The New York Times's Jesse Green, in a negative review that Pinkins claimed scuttled plans for the production to transfer to Broadway.

== Adaptations ==
=== 1961 film ===
In 1961, a film version was released featuring its original Broadway cast of Sidney Poitier, Ruby Dee, Claudia McNeil, Diana Sands, Ivan Dixon, Louis Gossett Jr. and John Fiedler. Hansberry wrote the screenplay, and the film was directed by Daniel Petrie. It was released by Columbia Pictures and Ruby Dee won the National Board of Review Award for Best Supporting Actress. Both Poitier and McNeil were nominated for Golden Globe Awards, and Petrie received a special "Gary Cooper Award" at the Cannes Film Festival.

=== 1973 musical ===
A musical version of the play, Raisin, ran on Broadway from October 18, 1973, to December 7, 1975. The book of the musical, which stayed faithful to the play, was written by Hansberry's ex-husband, Robert Nemiroff. Music and lyrics were by Judd Woldin and Robert Brittan. The cast included Joe Morton (Walter Lee), Virginia Capers (Mama), Ernestine Jackson (Ruth), Debbie Allen (Beneatha) and Ralph Carter (Travis, the Youngers' young son). It won the Tony Award for Best musical.

=== 1989 TV film ===
In 1989, the play was adapted into a TV film for PBS's American Playhouse series, starring Danny Glover (Walter Lee) and Esther Rolle (Mama), Kim Yancey (Beneatha), Starletta DuPois (Ruth), John Fiedler (Karl Lindner), and Helen Martin (Mrs. Johnson). This production received three Emmy Award nominations, but all were for technical categories. Bill Duke directed the production, while Chiz Schultz produced. This production was based on an off-Broadway revival produced by the Roundabout Theatre.

=== 1996 BBC Radio play ===
On 3 March 1996, the BBC broadcast a production by director/producer Claire Grove, with the following cast:

- Claire Benedict – Mama
- Ray Shell – Walter Lee
- Pat Bowie – Ruth
- Lachelle Carl – Beneatha
- Garren Givens – Travis
- Akim Mogaji – Joseph Asagai
- Ray Fearon – George Murchison
- John Sharion – Karl Lindner
- Dean Hill – Bobo

Strangers With Candy

Episode 3 of the satirical comedy series Strangers With Candy features a plotline revolving around a high school production of the play, in which the key characters are played exclusively by white actors.

=== 2008 TV film ===
In 2008, Sean Combs, Phylicia Rashad, Audra McDonald, and Sanaa Lathan reprised their roles from the 2004 Broadway revival in a television film directed by Kenny Leon. The film debuted at the 2008 Sundance Film Festival and was broadcast by ABC on February 25, 2008. Rashad and McDonald received Emmy nominations for their portrayals of Lena and Ruth. According to Nielsen Media Research, the program was watched by 12.7 million viewers and ranked No. 9 in the ratings for the week ending March 2, 2008.

=== 2016 BBC Radio Play ===
On 31 January 2016, the BBC broadcast a new production of the play by director/producer Pauline Harris. This version restores the character of Mrs. Johnson and a number of scenes cut from the Broadway production and subsequent film, with the following cast:

- Danny Sapani – Walter Lee Younger
- Dona Croll – Lena Younger
- Nadine Marshall – Ruth Younger
- Lenora Crichlow – Beneatha Younger
- Segun Fawole – Travis Younger
- Jude Akwudike – Bobo/Asagai
- Cecilia Noble – Mrs. Johnson
- Sean Baker – Karl Lindner
- Richard Pepple – George Murchison

== The Raisin Cycle ==
The 2010 Bruce Norris play Clybourne Park depicts the white family that sold the house to the Youngers. The first act takes place just before the events of A Raisin in the Sun, involving the selling of the house to the Black family; the second act takes place 50 years later.

The 2013 play by Kwame Kwei-Armah entitled Beneatha's Place follows Beneatha after she leaves with Asagai to Nigeria and, instead of becoming a doctor, later becomes the Dean of Social Sciences at a respected (unnamed) California university.

The two above plays, together with the original, were referred to by Kwei-Armah as "The Raisin Cycle" and were produced together by Baltimore's Center Stage in the 2012–2013 season.

== See also ==
- Civil rights movement in popular culture
