= Tony Award for Best Book of a Musical =

American Broadway theatre award

- Awarded for: Best Book of a Musical
- Location: United States New York City
- Presented by: American Theatre Wing The Broadway League
- Currently held by: Cinco Paul for Schmigadoon! (2026)
- Website: TonyAwards.com

The Tony Award for Best Book of a Musical is awarded to librettists of the spoken, non-sung dialogue, and storyline of a musical play. Eligibility is restricted to works with original narrative framework; plotless revues and revivals are ineligible. This award was originally called the Tony Award for Best Author, until musicals were split off from dramas.

== Winners and nominees ==
indicates the winner

=== 1940s ===
Year	Production	Author
1949 (3rd)
1949 (3rd)	Kiss Me, Kate	Bella and Samuel Spewack

=== 1950s ===
Year	Production	Author
1950 (4th)
1950 (4th)	South Pacific	Oscar Hammerstein II and Joshua Logan

=== 1960s ===
Year	Production	Author
1962 (16th)
1962 (16th)	How to Succeed in Business Without Really Trying	Abe Burrows, Willie Gilbert and Jack Weinstock
1962 (16th)	Carnival!	Helen Deutsch and Michael Stewart
1963 (17th)
1963 (17th)	A Funny Thing Happened on the Way to the Forum	Larry Gelbart and Burt Shevelove
1963 (17th)	Little Me	Neil Simon
1963 (17th)	Oliver!	Lionel Bart
1963 (17th)	Stop the World – I Want to Get Off	Leslie Bricusse and Anthony Newley
1964 (18th)
1964 (18th)	Hello, Dolly!	Michael Stewart
1964 (18th)	The Girl Who Came to Supper	Noël Coward and Harry Kurnitz
1964 (18th)	High Spirits	Timothy Gray and Hugh Martin
1964 (18th)	She Loves Me	Joe Masteroff
1965 (19th)
1965 (19th)	Fiddler on the Roof	Joseph Stein
1965 (19th)	Baker Street	Jerome Coopersmith
1965 (19th)	Ben Franklin in Paris	Sidney Michaels
1965 (19th)	Half a Sixpence	Beverley Cross

=== 1970s ===
Year	Production	Author
1971 (25th)
1971 (25th)	Company	George Furth
1971 (25th)	The Me Nobody Knows	Robert H. Livingston and Herb Schapiro
1971 (25th)	The Rothschilds	Sherman Yellen
1972 (26th)
1972 (26th)	Two Gentlemen of Verona	John Guare and Mel Shapiro
1972 (26th)	Ain't Supposed to Die a Natural Death	Melvin Van Peebles
1972 (26th)	Follies	James Goldman
1972 (26th)	Grease	Warren Casey and Jim Jacobs
1973 (27th)
1973 (27th)	A Little Night Music	Hugh Wheeler
1973 (27th)	Don't Bother Me, I Can't Cope	Micki Grant
1973 (27th)	Don't Play Us Cheap	Melvin Van Peebles
1973 (27th)	Pippin	Roger O. Hirson
1974 (28th)
1974 (28th)	Candide	Hugh Wheeler
1974 (28th)	Raisin	Robert Nemiroff and Charlotte Zaltzberg
1974 (28th)	Seesaw	Michael Bennett
1975 (29th)
1975 (29th)	Shenandoah	James Lee Barrett, Philip Rose and Peter Udell
1975 (29th)	The Lieutenant	Gene Curty, Nitra Scharfman and Chuck Strand
1975 (29th)	Mack and Mabel	Michael Stewart
1975 (29th)	The Wiz	William F. Brown
1976 (30th)
1976 (30th)	A Chorus Line	Nicholas Dante and James Kirkwood Jr.
1976 (30th)	Chicago	Fred Ebb and Bob Fosse
1976 (30th)	Pacific Overtures	John Weidman
1976 (30th)	The Robber Bridegroom	Alfred Uhry
1977 (31st)
1977 (31st)	Annie	Thomas Meehan
1977 (31st)	Happy End	Michael Feingold and Elisabeth Hauptmann
1977 (31st)	I Love My Wife	Michael Stewart
1977 (31st)	Your Arms Too Short to Box with God	Vinnette Justine Carroll
1978 (32nd)
1978 (32nd)	On the Twentieth Century	Betty Comden and Adolph Green
1978 (32nd)	A History of the American Film	Christopher Durang
1978 (32nd)	Runaways	Elizabeth Swados
1978 (32nd)	Working	Stephen Schwartz
1979 (33rd)
1979 (33rd)	Sweeney Todd: The Demon Barber of Fleet Street	Hugh Wheeler
1979 (33rd)	Ballroom	Jerome Kass
1979 (33rd)	The Best Little Whorehouse in Texas	Larry L. King and Peter Masterson
1979 (33rd)	They're Playing Our Song	Neil Simon

=== 1980s ===
Year	Production	Author
1980 (34th)
1980 (34th)	Evita	Tim Rice
1980 (34th)	Barnum	Mark Bramble
1980 (34th)	A Day in Hollywood / A Night in the Ukraine	Dick Vosburgh
1980 (34th)	Sugar Babies	Ralph G. Allen and Harry Rigby
1981 (35th)
1981 (35th)	Woman of the Year	Peter Stone
1981 (35th)	42nd Street	Mark Bramble and Michael Stewart
1981 (35th)	Tintypes	Mary Kyte
1981 (35th)	The Moony Shapiro Songbook	Julian More and Monty Norman
1982 (36th)
1982 (36th)	Dreamgirls	Tom Eyen
1982 (36th)	The First	Martin Charnin and Joel Siegel
1982 (36th)	Nine	Arthur Kopit
1982 (36th)	Joseph and the Amazing Technicolor Dreamcoat	Tim Rice
1983 (37th)
1983 (37th)	Cats	T. S. Eliot
1983 (37th)	A Doll's Life	Betty Comden and Adolph Green
1983 (37th)	Merlin	Richard Levinson and William Link
1983 (37th)	My One and Only	Timothy S. Mayer and Peter Stone
1984 (38th)
1984 (38th)	La Cage aux Folles	Harvey Fierstein
1984 (38th)	Baby	Sybille Pearson
1984 (38th)	Sunday in the Park with George	James Lapine
1984 (38th)	The Tap Dance Kid	Charles Blackwell
1985 (39th)
1985 (39th)	Big River	William Hauptman
1985 (39th)	Grind	Fay Kanin
1985 (39th)	Harrigan 'N Hart	Michael Stewart
1985 (39th)	Quilters	Barbara Damashek and Molly Newman
1986 (40th)
1986 (40th)	The Mystery of Edwin Drood	Rupert Holmes
1986 (40th)	Big Deal	Bob Fosse
1986 (40th)	Singin' in the Rain	Betty Comden and Adolph Green
1986 (40th)	Wind in the Willows	Jane Iredale
1987 (41st)
1987 (41st)	Les Misérables	Alain Boublil and Claude-Michel Schönberg
1987 (41st)	Me and My Girl	Stephen Fry, Douglas Furber, Mike Ockrent and L. Arthur Rose
1987 (41st)	Rags	Joseph Stein
1987 (41st)	Smile	Howard Ashman
1988 (42nd)
1988 (42nd)	Into the Woods	James Lapine
1988 (42nd)	The Gospel at Colonus	Lee Breuer
1988 (42nd)	The Phantom of the Opera	Richard Stilgoe and Andrew Lloyd Webber
1988 (42nd)	Romance/Romance	Barry Harman

=== 1990s ===
Year	Production	Author
1990 (44th)
1990 (44th)	City of Angels	Larry Gelbart
1990 (44th)	Aspects of Love	Andrew Lloyd Webber
1990 (44th)	Grand Hotel	Luther Davis
1990 (44th)	Meet Me in St. Louis	Hugh Wheeler
1991 (45th)
1991 (45th)	The Secret Garden	Marsha Norman
1991 (45th)	Miss Saigon	Alain Boublil and Claude-Michel Schönberg
1991 (45th)	Once on This Island	Lynn Ahrens
1991 (45th)	The Will Rogers Follies	Peter Stone
1992 (46th)
1992 (46th)	Falsettos	William Finn and James Lapine
1992 (46th)	Crazy for You	Ken Ludwig
1992 (46th)	Five Guys Named Moe	Clarke Peters
1992 (46th)	Jelly's Last Jam	George C. Wolfe
1993 (47th)
1993 (47th)	Kiss of the Spider Woman	Terrence McNally
1993 (47th)	Anna Karenina	Peter Kellogg
1993 (47th)	Blood Brothers	Willy Russell
1993 (47th)	The Who's Tommy	Des McAnuff and Pete Townshend
1994 (48th)
1994 (48th)	Passion	James Lapine
1994 (48th)	Beauty and the Beast	Linda Woolverton
1994 (48th)	Cyrano: The Musical	Koen van Dijk
1994 (48th)	A Grand Night for Singing	Walter Bobbie
1995 (49th)
1995 (49th)	Sunset Boulevard	Don Black and Christopher Hampton
1996 (50th)
1996 (50th)	Rent	Jonathan Larson
1996 (50th)	Big	John Weidman
1996 (50th)	Bring in 'da Noise, Bring in 'da Funk	Reg E. Gaines
1996 (50th)	Chronicle of a Death Foretold	Graciela Daniele, Michael John LaChiusa and Jim Lewis
1997 (51st)
1997 (51st)	Titanic	Peter Stone
1997 (51st)	Jekyll & Hyde	Leslie Bricusse
1997 (51st)	The Life	Cy Coleman, Ira Gasman and David Newman
1997 (51st)	Steel Pier	David Thompson
1998 (52nd)
1998 (52nd)	Ragtime	Terrence McNally
1998 (52nd)	The Lion King	Roger Allers and Irene Mecchi
1998 (52nd)	The Scarlet Pimpernel	Nan Knighton
1998 (52nd)	Side Show	Bill Russell
1999 (53rd)
1999 (53rd)	Parade	Alfred Uhry
1999 (53rd)	Footloose	Walter Bobbie and Dean Pitchford
1999 (53rd)	It Ain't Nothin' but the Blues	Charles Bevel, Lita Gaithers, Randal Myler, Ron Taylor and Dan Wheetman
1999 (53rd)	Marlene	Pam Gems

=== 2000s ===
Year	Production	Author
2000 (54th)
2000 (54th)	James Joyce's The Dead	Richard Nelson
2000 (54th)	Contact	John Weidman
2000 (54th)	Marie Christine	Michael John LaChiusa
2000 (54th)	The Wild Party	Michael John LaChiusa and George C. Wolfe
2001 (55th)
2001 (55th)	The Producers	Mel Brooks and Thomas Meehan
2001 (55th)	A Class Act	Linda Kline and Lonny Price
2001 (55th)	The Full Monty	Terrence McNally
2001 (55th)	Jane Eyre	John Caird
2002 (56th)
2002 (56th)	Urinetown	Greg Kotis
2002 (56th)	Mamma Mia!	Catherine Johnson
2002 (56th)	Sweet Smell of Success	John Guare
2002 (56th)	Thoroughly Modern Millie	Richard Morris and Dick Scanlan
2003 (57th)
2003 (57th)	Hairspray	Thomas Meehan and Mark O'Donnell
2003 (57th)	Amour	Jeremy Sams and Didier Van Cauwelaert
2003 (57th)	Flower Drum Song	David Henry Hwang
2003 (57th)	A Year with Frog and Toad	Willie Reale
2004 (58th)
2004 (58th)	Avenue Q	Jeff Whitty
2004 (58th)	The Boy from Oz	Nick Enright and Martin Sherman
2004 (58th)	Caroline, or Change	Tony Kushner
2004 (58th)	Wicked	Winnie Holzman
2005 (59th)
2005 (59th)	The 25th Annual Putnam County Spelling Bee	Rachel Sheinkin
2005 (59th)	Dirty Rotten Scoundrels	Jeffrey Lane
2005 (59th)	The Light in the Piazza	Craig Lucas
2005 (59th)	Monty Python's Spamalot	Eric Idle
2006 (60th)
2006 (60th)	The Drowsy Chaperone	Bob Martin and Don McKellar
2006 (60th)	The Color Purple	Marsha Norman
2006 (60th)	Jersey Boys	Marshall Brickman and Rick Elice
2006 (60th)	The Wedding Singer	Chad Beguelin and Tim Herlihy
2007 (61st)
2007 (61st)	Spring Awakening	Steven Sater
2007 (61st)	Curtains	Rupert Holmes and Peter Stone
2007 (61st)	Grey Gardens	Doug Wright
2007 (61st)	Legally Blonde The Musical	Heather Hach
2008 (62nd)
2008 (62nd)	Passing Strange	Stew
2008 (62nd)	Cry-Baby	Mark O'Donnell and Thomas Meehan
2008 (62nd)	In the Heights	Quiara Alegría Hudes
2008 (62nd)	Xanadu	Douglas Carter Beane
2009 (63rd)
2009 (63rd)	Billy Elliot the Musical	Lee Hall
2009 (63rd)	Next to Normal	Brian Yorkey
2009 (63rd)	Shrek the Musical	David Lindsay-Abaire
2009 (63rd)	[title of show]	Hunter Bell

=== 2010s ===
Year	Production	Author
2010 (64th)
2010 (64th)	Memphis	Joe DiPietro
2010 (64th)	Everyday Rapture	Dick Scanlan and Sherie Rene Scott
2010 (64th)	Fela!	Bill T. Jones and Jim Lewis
2010 (64th)	Million Dollar Quartet	Colin Escott and Floyd Mutrux
2011 (65th)
2011 (65th)	The Book of Mormon	Trey Parker, Robert Lopez and Matt Stone
2011 (65th)	Bloody Bloody Andrew Jackson	Alex Timbers
2011 (65th)	The Scottsboro Boys	David Thompson
2011 (65th)	Sister Act	Douglas Carter Beane, Bill and Cheri Steinkellner
2012 (66th)
2012 (66th)	Once	Enda Walsh
2012 (66th)	Lysistrata Jones	Douglas Carter Beane
2012 (66th)	Newsies	Harvey Fierstein
2012 (66th)	Nice Work If You Can Get It	Joe DiPietro
2013 (67th)
2013 (67th)	Matilda the Musical	Dennis Kelly
2013 (67th)	A Christmas Story: The Musical	Joseph Robinette
2013 (67th)	Kinky Boots	Harvey Fierstein
2013 (67th)	Rodgers + Hammerstein's Cinderella	Douglas Carter Beane
2014 (68th)
2014 (68th)	A Gentleman's Guide to Love and Murder	Robert L. Freedman
2014 (68th)	Aladdin	Chad Beguelin
2014 (68th)	Beautiful: The Carole King Musical	Douglas McGrath
2014 (68th)	Bullets Over Broadway	Woody Allen
2015 (69th)
2015 (69th)	Fun Home	Lisa Kron
2015 (69th)	An American in Paris	Craig Lucas
2015 (69th)	Something Rotten!	Karey Kirkpatrick and John O'Farrell
2015 (69th)	The Visit	Terrence McNally
2016 (70th)
2016 (70th)	Hamilton	Lin-Manuel Miranda
2016 (70th)	Bright Star	Steve Martin
2016 (70th)	School of Rock	Julian Fellowes
2016 (70th)	Shuffle Along, or, the Making of the Musical Sensation of 1921 and All That Followed	George C. Wolfe
2017 (71st)
2017 (71st)	Dear Evan Hansen	Steven Levenson
2017 (71st)	Come from Away	David Hein and Irene Sankoff
2017 (71st)	Groundhog Day	Danny Rubin
2017 (71st)	Natasha, Pierre & The Great Comet of 1812	Dave Malloy
2018 (72nd)
2018 (72nd)	The Band's Visit	Itamar Moses
2018 (72nd)	Frozen	Jennifer Lee
2018 (72nd)	Mean Girls	Tina Fey
2018 (72nd)	SpongeBob SquarePants	Kyle Jarrow
2019 (73rd)
2019 (73rd)	Tootsie	Robert Horn
2019 (73rd)	Ain’t Too Proud	Dominique Morisseau
2019 (73rd)	Beetlejuice	Scott Brown and Anthony King
2019 (73rd)	Hadestown	Anaïs Mitchell
2019 (73rd)	The Prom	Chad Beguelin and Bob Martin

=== 2020s ===
Year	Production	Author
2020 (74th)
2020 (74th)	Jagged Little Pill	Diablo Cody
2020 (74th)	Moulin Rouge! The Musical	John Logan
2020 (74th)	Tina: The Tina Turner Musical	Katori Hall, Frank Ketelaar and Kees Prins
2022 (75th)
2022 (75th)	A Strange Loop	Michael R. Jackson
2022 (75th)	Girl from the North Country	Conor McPherson
2022 (75th)	MJ	Lynn Nottage
2022 (75th)	Mr. Saturday Night	Billy Crystal, Lowell Ganz and Babaloo Mandel
2022 (75th)	Paradise Square	Christina Anderson, Craig Lucas and Larry Kirwan
2023 (76th)
2023 (76th)	Kimberly Akimbo	David Lindsay-Abaire
2023 (76th)	& Juliet	David West Read
2023 (76th)	New York, New York	David Thompson and Sharon Washington
2023 (76th)	Shucked	Robert Horn
2023 (76th)	Some Like It Hot	Matthew Lopez and Amber Ruffin
2024 (77th)
2024 (77th)	Suffs	Shaina Taub
2024 (77th)	Hell's Kitchen	Kristoffer Diaz
2024 (77th)	The Notebook	Bekah Brunstetter
2024 (77th)	The Outsiders	Justin Levine and Adam Rapp
2024 (77th)	Water for Elephants	Rick Elice
2025 (78th)
2025 (78th)	Maybe Happy Ending	Will Aronson and Hue Park
2025 (78th)	Buena Vista Social Club	Marco Ramirez
2025 (78th)	Dead Outlaw	Itamar Moses
2025 (78th)	Death Becomes Her	Marco Pennette
2025 (78th)	Operation Mincemeat: A New Musical	David Cumming, Felix Hagan, Natasha Hodgson and Zoë Roberts
2026 (79th)
2026 (79th)	Schmigadoon!	Cinco Paul
2026 (79th)	The Lost Boys	David Hornsby and Chris Hoch
2026 (79th)	Titanique	Marla Mindelle, Constantine Rousouli and Tye Blue
2026 (79th)	Two Strangers (Carry a Cake Across New York)	Jim Barne and Kit Buchan

== Award records ==
3 Wins

- Hugh Wheeler (2 consecutive)
- Thomas Meehan
- James Lapine

2 Wins

- Terrence McNally
- Larry Gelbart
- Peter Stone

== Nomination records ==
5 Nominations

- Michael Stewart
- Peter Stone

4 Nominations

- Douglas Carter Beane
- James Lapine
- Terrence McNally
- Hugh Wheeler
- Thomas Meehan

3 Nominations

- Chad Beguelin
- Harvey Fierstein
- Michael John LaChiusa
- David Thompson
- George C. Wolfe
- Betty Comden
- Adolph Green
- Craig Lucas
- John Weidman

2 Nominations

- Walter Bobbie
- Alain Boublil
- Mark Bramble
- Leslie Bricusse
- Alfred Uhry
- Joe DiPietro
- Rick Elice
- Bob Fosse
- Larry Gelbart
- John Guare
- Rupert Holmes
- Robert Horn
- Jim Lewis
- David Lindsay-Abaire
- Bob Martin
- Itamar Moses
- Marsha Norman
- Tim Rice
- Dick Scanlan
- Claude-Michel Schönberg
- Neil Simon
- Joseph Stein
- Melvin Van Peebles
- Andrew Lloyd Webber
- Mark O'Donnell

== See also ==
- Tony Award for Best Original Score
- Drama Desk Award for Outstanding Book of a Musical
- Laurence Olivier Award for Best Original Score or New Orchestrations
- List of Tony Award-nominated productions
