= Raisin (original Broadway cast recording) =

Raisin – Original Cast Recording
- CD reissue cover

Cast recording by the original cast
- Released: November 23, 1973
- Label: Columbia Masterworks

Raisin, subtitled Original Cast Recording, is an album containing a recording of the musical Raisin made by its original 1973 Broadway cast. The album was released on Columbia Masterworks on November 23, 1973.

== Background ==
The album was produced by Thomas Z. Shepard.

== Critical reception ==
Professional ratings
Review scores
Source	Rating
Billboard	(no rating)

The Billboard reviewed the album in December 1973, noting: "[The musical work] is supposed to relate a black family's struggling experience, but the music by Judd Woldin and lyrics by Robert Brittan aren't black at all. And that's sad because the play should attract customers for this LP. It's a white sounding black story; there's no soul sounds in the score."

== Track listing ==
LP – Columbia Masterworks KS 32754

All lyrics are written by Robert Brittan; all music is composed by Judd Woldin.

Side 1
No.	Title	Artist(s)	Length
1.	"Prologue"	Orchestra	3:40
2.	"Man Say"	Joe Morton, Ernestine Jackson	3:28
3.	"Whose Little Angry Man"	Ernestine Jackson	1:54
4.	"Runnin' to Meet the Man"	Joe Morton and Company	3:08
5.	"A Whole Lotta Sunlight"	Virginia Capers	4:07
6.	"Alaiyo"	Robert Jackson, Deborah Allen	3:46
7.	"Sweet Time"	Ernestine Jackson, Joe Morton	5:05
8.	"You Done Right"	Joe Morton, Virginia Capers	3:44

Side 2
No.	Title	Artist(s)	Length
1.	"He Come Down This Morning"	Herb Downer, Virginia Capers, Marenda Perry, Helen Martin, Ernestine Jackson, Ralph Carter and Company	5:52
2.	"It's a Deal"	Joe Morton	2:31
3.	"Sidewalk Tree"	Ralph Carter	2:50
4.	"It's a Deal – Coda"	Joe Morton	1:41
5.	"Not Anymore"	Joe Morton, Ernestine Jackson, Deborah Allen, Virginia Capers	5:23
6.	"It's a Deal – Reprise"	Joe Morton, Virginia Capers, Ernestine Jackson	2:58
7.	"Measure the Valleys"	Virginia Capers	4:10
8.	"Finale"	Ensemble	2:07

== Awards ==
Year	Award type	Categories	Results	Ref.
1975	Grammy Awards	Best Score from the Original Cast Show Album	Won	
