= Ulysses in Nighttown =

1958 play based on the 1922 novel Ulysses by James Joyce

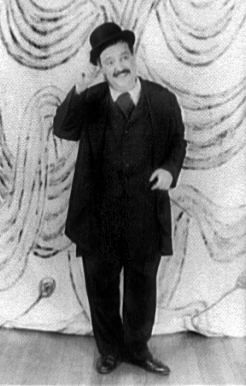
Zero Mostel as Leopold Bloom in Ulysses in Nighttown (1958)

Ulysses in Nighttown is a play based on the fifteenth episode of James Joyce's 1922 novel Ulysses. It was adapted by Marjorie Barkentin and contains incidental music by Peter Link. The episode it is based on, "Circe", is unique in that it is written as a play script.

The show opened Off-Broadway in 1958 with Zero Mostel to a long and successful run, earning Mostel an Obie Award. It debuted on Broadway on February 15, 1974, at the Winter Garden Theatre and ran for 69 performances. The show had previously done a preview run of 26 performances in Philadelphia. The cast included Zero Mostel, Margery Beddow, Fionnula Flanagan, Gale Garnett, Tommy Lee Jones, John Astin, and David Ogden Stiers.

In 1974, the play received six nominations at the 28th Tony Awards, winning for Best Lighting Design in a Play.

== Awards and honors ==
=== Original Broadway production ===
Year	Award ceremony	Category	Nominee	Result
1974	Tony Award	Best Play		Nominated
1974	Tony Award	Best Performance by a Leading Actor in a Play	Zero Mostel	Nominated
1974	Tony Award	Best Performance by a Featured Actress in a Play	Fionnula Flanagan	Nominated
1974	Tony Award	Best Direction of a Play	Burgess Meredith	Nominated
1974	Tony Award	Best Scenic Design	Ed Wittstein	Nominated
1974	Tony Award	Best Lighting Design	Jules Fisher	Won
1974	Drama Desk Award	Outstanding Actor in a Play	Zero Mostel	Won

== See also ==
Ulysses, Episode 15 "Circe"
