= Marjorie Barkentin =

American publicist, playwright (1891–1977)

Marjorie Barkentin (née Marjorie Hayden Palmer; September 15, 1891 – February 27, 1974), was an American playwright and press agent. She adapted part of James Joyce's Ulysses under the supervision of Padraic Colum into Ulysses in Nighttown. She was also an artist and art restorer.

== Life and career ==
Ulysses in Nighttown was staged off-Broadway in 1958, and reprised in 1974 on Broadway. Burgess Meredith directed the 1974 staging. The 1974 show received Tony nominations (28th Tony Awards) including for Best Play. She was photographed with Burgess, Zero Mostel, and Anne Meara at a rehearsal, which is part of the collection at the New York Public Library. The play was reprised in 1989. Some of the reviews of the play were unfavorable.

Her husband, William Slater Barkentin (September 9, 1874 – February 1962), was an art restorer. He created the Coca Cola trademark.

She and Louis J. Alber hosted the Columbia Broadcasting System radio show Headline Makers. She worked with Oliver Sayler as a press agent. She received a copyright for Recovery playing cards in 1933.
