= Watch Your Mouth (TV series) =

1978 American comedy-drama television series

- Genre: Comedy drama
- Directed by: Stan Lathan
- Starring: Joe Morton
- Country of origin: United States
- Original language: English
- No. of seasons: 1
- No. of episodes: 28

Production
- Executive producer: Ellis Haizlip
- Running time: 30 minutes

Original release
- Network: PBS
- Release: April 8, 1978

Watch Your Mouth is a 1978 American comedy-drama television series which aired on Public Broadcasting Service (PBS) public television. The series focused upon Mr. Geeter (Joe Morton), a resourceful language skills teacher, and his ethnically diverse group of high schoolers. All of the episodes were aired in the New York City metro area, but for various reasons only ten episodes were aired nationally.

== Cast ==
The cast included:

- Joe Morton as Mr. Geeter
- George Campbell as Melvin
- Luis Figueroa as Raoul
- Joanna Glushak as Bonnie
- Glen Harris as Franklin
- Ginny Ortiz as Carmen
- Lionel Pina as Carlos
- Jody Price as Mary
- Robert Rush as Bobby

== Reaction ==
Dissatisfied with the quality of the production, PBS initially planned to not air the series at all. According to Ron Devillier, who served as director of programming administration at the time, PBS later decided that the series was "important and that we should run something." The network decided to air ten episodes on the national network.
