= Daniel W. Owens =

American playwright

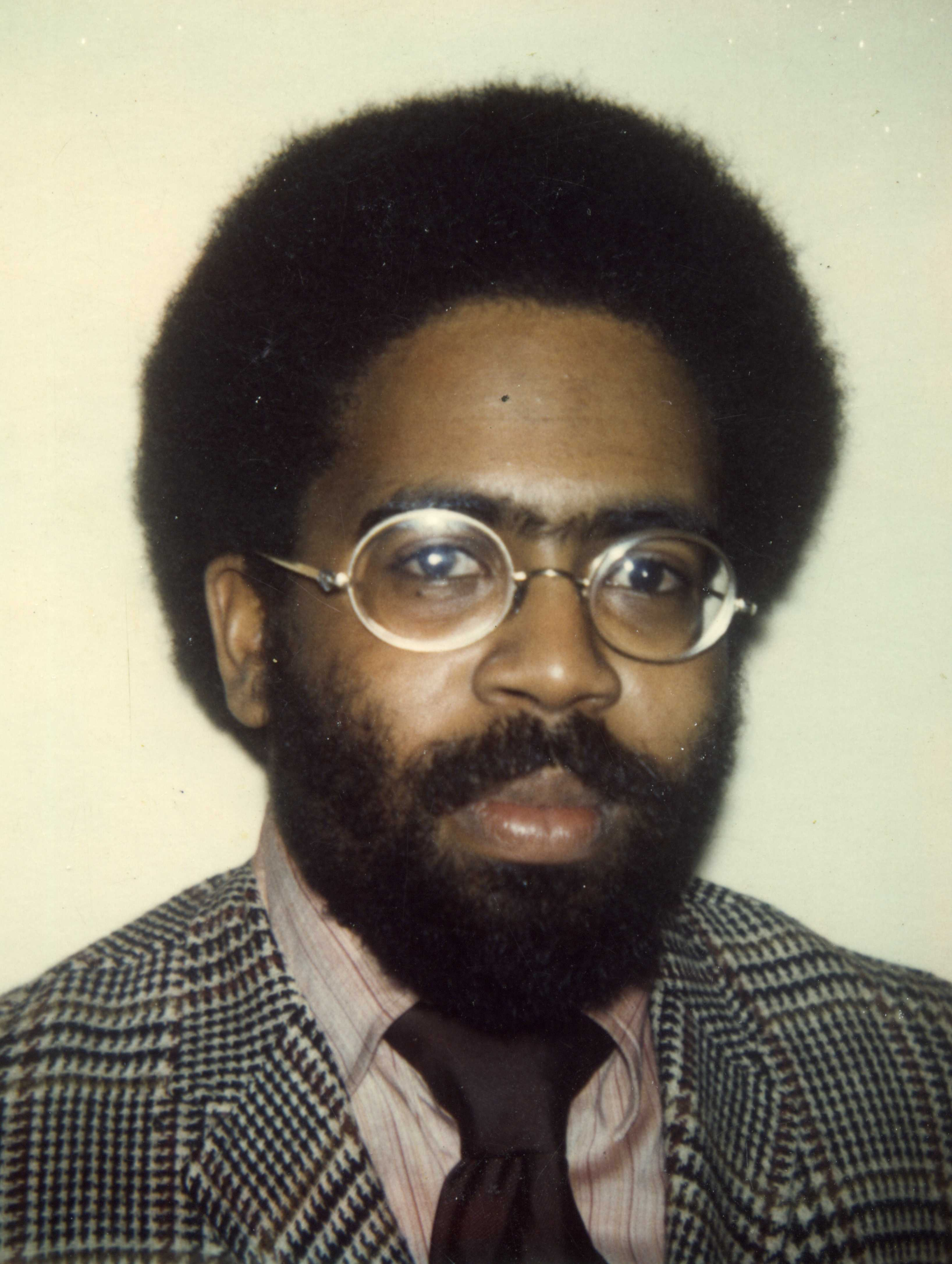
Dan Owens in the mid 1970s

Daniel W. Owens known by most as Dan Owens is an American playwright.

Owens was born in Malden, MA. He received his education at Bryant and Straton Junior College (certificate in computer programming, 1968). He also attended Boston State College (1968) and the University of Massachusetts at Boston. Owens attended Yale University School of Drama (playwriting, 1971 – 1972), and Harvard University School of Education (Ed.M) where he received his Master's in Education. He then went on to teach black theater and playwriting at Boston University and the University of Massachusetts. While at the University of Massachusetts Owens wrote for the locally produced television show Brotherlove.

In the mid-1970s Owens moved from Roxbury, MA to New York City to write many successful off-broadway productions including critically acclaimed The Michigan, 1979. Owens followed up the following year with Lagrima Del Diablo (The Devil's Tear), 1980. In "Lagrima del Diablo" ("The Devil's Tear"), author Dan Owens imagines a power struggle between a Roman Catholic churchman and a revolutionary leader on a recently de-colonialized West Indian island. Archbishop Stephen Emmanuel Pontifex (Graham Brown) has ordered the closing of the local churches until the revolution frees his fellow churchmen. "Lagrima del Diablo" ("The Devil's Tear") premiered at St. Mark's Playhouse in New York on January 10, 1980 . In 1999 Owens teamed up with veteran actor John Amos (Good Times, Roots) for the production of Lindstrom and Matombi. The play captures the intercommunications of UN peacekeeping force officer Lieutenant Colonel Henry Lindstrom and the leader of a small Angolan opposition army General Isaac Ernesto Motambi.

Owens coauthored Langston Hughes's Little Ham: A Harlem Jazzical with Judd Woldin in 2003. The book was published by Samuel French, Inc and performed as a musical Off Broadway. Langston Hughes's Little Ham: A Harlem Jazzical Is set in the heyday of the 1930s Harlem Renaissance. The story follows Hamlet Hitchcock Jones, known as Little Ham, as he prevents a downtown mob from taking over the Harlem numbers racket. Hughes's Little Ham: A Harlem Jazzical Arranger Luther Henderson was nominated for 2003 Drama Desk Award, Outstanding Orchestrations.

One of Owens' plays, "The Gang on the Roof" was supported by a grant from the Kennedy Center Fund for New American Plays. "The Gang on the Roof" was inspired by a Seattle P-I article about a Vietnam-era racial mutiny. After years of writing in New York City he moved to Seattle where he continued with his play Bobbie and Jerome, which received its world premiere at Langston Hughes Performing Arts Center in Seattle. In September 2013, Owens premiered "Hello Darlin's: Mom's got something to tell you!". "Hello Darlin's: Mom's got something to tell you!" is a one-woman tribute to the late Jackie "Moms" Mabley. Owens was credited in multiple publications for capturing the irreverent and controversial aura of Jackie "Moms" Mabley in a reverent but comic light.

Owens is a two time participant in the Eugene O'Neill’s National Playwrights Conference. Only eight scripts per year are selected from more than 1,400 submitted scripts to be invited for the Eugene O'Neill’s National Playwrights Conference. Writers receive a stipend and full room and board on a 90-acre seaside property, attending all first rehearsals and staged readings of their peers' work in addition to their own workshops.
