= Oliver Sayler =

American theater critic and writer (1887 - 1958)

Oliver Martin Sayler (23 October 1887 - 19 October 1958) was an American theater critic and writer. He was an authority on Russian theatre under the communists. In the 1920s, he and his business partner, Marjorie Barkentin, became Morris Gest's press agents, a position they held until Gest's death in 1942.

== Selected publications ==
- Russia, White or Red (1919)
- The Russian Theatre under the Revolution (1920) (revised and republished in 1922 as The Russian Theatre)
- Our American Theatre (1923)
- Max Reinhardt and His Theatre (1924)
- Inside the Moscow Art Theatre (1925)
- Revolt in the Arts : a survey of the creation, distribution and appreciation of art in America (1930)
