= Raisin (musical) =

Musical by Judd Woldin and Robert Brittan

- Original Cast Recording
- Music: Judd Woldin
- Lyrics: Robert Brittan
- Book: Robert B. Nemiroff; Charlotte Zaltzberg
- Basis: A Raisin in the Sun by Lorraine Hansberry
- Productions: 1973 Broadway; 1975 First National Tour
- Awards: Tony Award for Best Musical

Raisin is a musical with music by Judd Woldin, lyrics by Robert Brittan, and a book by Robert Nemiroff and Charlotte Zaltzberg. It is an adaptation of the Lorraine Hansberry play A Raisin in the Sun; the musical's book was co-written by Hansberry's husband, Robert Nemiroff. Ernestine Jackson participated also in the Raisin musical in 1973, she originated the role of Ruth Younger.

The story concerns an African-American family in Chicago in 1951. The musical was nominated for nine Tony Awards, winning two, including Best Musical, and the Broadway production ran for 847 performances.

== Synopsis ==
In Chicago in 1951, an African-American family – Ruth Younger, her husband Walter Lee Younger, their son Travis, and Walter's mother Mama Lena – are living in a cramped apartment. Walter is a chauffeur but thinks that his father's life insurance policy proceeds will buy a way to a better life. He plans on buying a liquor store, but his mother is against the selling of liquor. Tensions arise as Walter tries to convince Mama Lena to forget her dream of buying the family its own small house ("A Whole Lotta Sunlight").

Walter decides to make the deal for the liquor store and signs the papers with his partners Bobo Jones and Willie Harris. Beneatha, Walter's sister, is in college and is romantically involved with an African exchange student, Asagai. When Walter comes home drunk he joins Beneatha in a celebratory dance, picturing himself as a chieftain ("African Dance"). Ruth and Walter fight about their future but they reconcile ("Sweet Time"). Mama arrives to announce that she has bought a house in the white neighborhood of Clybourne Park, and Walter leaves in anger ("You Done Right").

Walter has not returned home and Mama finds him in a bar. She apologizes and gives him an envelope filled with money. She asks him to deposit $3,000 for Beneatha's college education, and tells him the rest is for him. As the family packs to move, a representative of Clybourne Park, Karl Lindner, arrives and offers to buy back the house. Walter, Ruth and Beneatha mockingly tell Mama of the enlightened attitude of their new neighbors. Just then Bobo arrives to tell the family the bad news that Willie has run off with the money. This forces Walter to contact Lindner and accept the offer to buy back the house. Although Beneatha berates her brother for not standing up for principles, Mama shows compassion and understanding ("Measure the Valleys").

When Lindner arrives, Walter announces that the family will, after all, move to the new house.

== Songs ==
Act I

- "Prologue" - Company
- "Man Say" - Walter Lee Younger
- "Whose Little Angry Man" - Ruth Younger
- "Runnin' to Meet the Man" - Walter Lee Younger and Company
- "A Whole Lotta Sunlight" - Mama
- "Booze" - Bar Girl, Bobo Jones, Walter Lee Younger, Willie Harris and Company
- "Alaiyo" - Asagai and Beneatha Younger
- "African Dance" - Beneatha Younger, Walter Lee Younger and Company
- "Sweet Time" - Ruth Younger and Walter Lee Younger
- "You Done Right" - Walter Lee Younger

Act II

- "He Come Down This Morning" - Pastor, Pastor's Wife, Mama and Mrs. Johnson
- "It's a Deal" - Walter Lee Younger
- "Sweet Time (Reprise)" - Ruth Younger and Walter Lee Younger
- "Sidewalk Tree" - Travis Younger
- "Not Anymore" - Walter Lee Younger, Ruth Younger and Beneatha Younger
- "Alaiyo (Reprise)" - Asagai
- "It's a Deal (Reprise)" - Walter Lee Younger
- "Measure the Valleys" - Mama
- "He Come Down This Morning (Reprise)" - Company

== Historical casting ==
Character	1973 Broadway cast	1975 First National Tour cast
Lena Younger	Virginia Capers	Virginia Capers
Ruth Younger	Ernestine Jackson	Mary Seymour
Beneatha Younger	Debbie Allen	Arnetia Walker
Walter Lee Younger	Joe Morton	Autris Paige
Travis Younger	Ralph Carter	Darren Green

== Productions ==
The musical began a pre-Broadway tryout on May 30, 1973 at the Arena Stage in Washington, D.C. It premiered on Broadway at the 46th Street Theatre on October 18, 1973, transferred to the Lunt-Fontanne Theatre on January 13, 1975, and closed on December 8, 1975 after 847 performances. Donald McKayle was the director and choreographer, and the cast featured Virginia Capers as Lena, Joe Morton as Walter, Ernestine Jackson as Ruth, Debbie Allen as Beneatha, Ralph Carter as Travis, Helen Martin as Mrs. Johnson, and Ted Ross as Bobo. Capers later starred in the national tour. The production won the Tony Award for Best Musical and Virginia Capers won a Tony Award for Best Performance by a Leading Actress in a Musical.

The International City Theatre in Long Beach, California presented the musical in February and March 2003.

The Court Theatre in Chicago staged the musical from September 14 through October 22, 2006. The cast included Ernestine Jackson, who formerly had played Ruth, in the role of Lena Younger.

== Critical reception ==
In reviewing a performance in Washington (Arena Stage), Clive Barnes of The New York Times called it "a warm and loving work." In his review of the Broadway production, Barnes noted that the book of the musical "is perhaps even better than the play... 'Raisin' is one of those unusual musicals that should not only delight people who love musicals, but might also well delight people who don't".

After the Broadway opening, Walter Kerr of The New York Times wrote, "The strength of Raisin lies in the keen intelligence and restless invention of a musical underscoring that has simply invaded Lorraine Hansbury's once tightly-knit, four-walled, close-quartered play, A Raisin in the Sun, plucking the walls away, spilling the action onto the streets with a jittery down-flight of strings, mocking and matching realistic speech with frog-throated sass from the heavy-breathing viols." The New York Times also reported that there are "ovations every night at the 46th Street Theatre for 'Raisin'. But they are for the cast, not individual performers. There are no stars... It was at the Arena Theater in Washington, where the play first opened this spring, that Mr. McKayle said he started evolving the ensemble-acting concept."

== Recordings ==
- Raisin – Original Cast Recording, a 1973 album containing a recording of the musical made by its original 1973 Broadway cast

== Awards and nominations ==
=== Original Broadway production ===
Year	Award	Category	Nominee	Result
1974	Tony Award	Best Musical		Won
1974	Tony Award	Best Book of a Musical	Robert Nemiroff and Charlotte Zaltzberg	Nominated
1974	Tony Award	Best Original Score	Judd Woldin and Robert Brittan	Nominated
1974	Tony Award	Best Performance by a Leading Actor in a Musical	Joe Morton	Nominated
1974	Tony Award	Best Performance by a Leading Actress in a Musical	Virginia Capers	Won
1974	Tony Award	Best Performance by a Featured Actor in a Musical	Ralph Carter	Nominated
1974	Tony Award	Best Performance by a Featured Actress in a Musical	Ernestine Jackson	Nominated
1974	Tony Award	Best Direction of a Musical	Donald McKayle	Nominated
1974	Tony Award	Best Choreography	Donald McKayle	Nominated
1974	Theatre World Award		Ralph Carter	Won
1974	Theatre World Award		Ernestine Jackson	Won
1974	Theatre World Award		Joe Morton	Won
1975	Grammy Award	Best Score From the Original Cast Show Album	Robert Brittan, Judd Woldin (composers); Thomas Z. Shepard (producer); the original cast (Virginia Capers, Joe Morton, Ernestine Jackson, Robert Jackson, Deborah Allen, Helen Martin)	Won
