= Charlotte Zaltzberg =

American writer (1924-1974)

- Born: Charlotte Singer; April 25, 1924; Bronx, NY
- Died: February 24, 1974 (aged 49); New York, NY
- Occupation: Writer
- Years active: 1966–1974

Charlotte Zaltzberg (born Charlotte Singer; April 25, 1924 – February 24, 1974) was nominated for a Tony Award in 1974 for co-writing the book for the 1973 Broadway musical Raisin, which won the Tony Award for Best Musical in 1974. She worked with Robert Nemiroff, Lorraine Hansberry's former husband and the executor of her estate, on adaptations of Hansberry's work for theater productions.

== Early life ==
Zaltzberg was born in The Bronx, New York, the youngest of six children. Her parents, Ida and Harry, came from Poland and settled in the Bronx, and Harry worked in a jewelry shop on Hester Street. She played the piano by ear, sang, and danced. Zaltzberg's older sister Sadie took her to the theater. Sadie married Joseph Stein, the bookwriter of the hit Broadway musical Fiddler on the Roof among others, and together they educated Zaltzberg about theater and developed her interest in writing. During the creation of Fiddler, Stein sent Zaltzberg the script for her input. Aside from Stein, Zaltzberg was influenced by the writer Sean O’Casey. She read poetry, such as Shakespeare, Millay, Dickinson, and Yeats, and loved the Group Theatre, Paul Robeson, and Mark Blitzstein.

Zaltzberg went to Jewish socially progressive or “lefty” summer camps. She attended Evander Childs High School in the Bronx, and was in the American Student Union, a national left-wing organization usually for college students.

== Personal life ==
In 1947/1948 she married Alex Zaltzberg, a social worker and World War II veteran. They had two children, Ellen, born in 1949, and Harry, born in 1953. They lived in West Harlem and Marble Hill, Manhattan, until 1957, when they moved to Croton, New York. Croton was home to many left-wing artists, and the family participated in many protests, including picketing the Woolworths in Ossining after the Greensboro sit-ins at a Woolworth's store. Zaltzberg would also bring her daughter Ellen to many protests, including the March on Washington. Zaltzberg and her husband separated in 1969.

== Career ==
After Lorraine Hansberry died in 1965, her former husband Robert Nemiroff became the executor of her estate and was looking for a secretary. He hired Zaltzberg in 1966, and soon Zaltzberg was assisting with organizing Hansberry’s archive.

=== To Be Young, Gifted and Black ===
Her first major project with Nemiroff was adapting Hansberry’s writings for a WBAI radio documentary, To Be Young, Gifted and Black, which aired in 1967. They then adapted Hansberry’s writing into the play To Be Young, Gifted and Black. The play ran off-Broadway in 1969, receiving good reviews, and a subsequent tour went into the south and to all-black schools. Zaltzberg herself adapted the one-woman version.

=== Les Blancs ===
In 1970, Zaltzberg worked with Nemiroff to bring Hansberry’s last play, Les Blancs, to Broadway. Billed as the script associate, she worked with Nemiroff to finish the play, using incomplete drafts. The play was heavily criticized and closed after 40 performances but it received two Tony Award nominations for Best Costume Design and Best Featured Actress. It also won a Drama Desk Award for Outstanding Performance for James Earl Jones.

=== Mayfair Theatre ===
In the early 1970s, Zaltzberg also worked as the general manager of the Mayfair Theatre, a Yiddish theatre company in the Mayfair Hotel in midtown. Since Zaltzberg knew Yiddish, she brought in audiences from the surrounding areas.

=== Raisin ===
Soon after Hansberry died, Nemiroff chose a treatment for a musical version of Raisin from composer Judd Woldin and lyricist Robert Brittan. It then took seven years to get the interest and backing from producers. The musical had its pre-Broadway opening at D.C.’s Arena Stage in the spring of 1973. After another pre-Broadway tryout in Philadelphia, the show opened on Broadway on October 18, 1973.

Clive Barnes wrote in The New York Times in October 1973: "The present book by Robert Nemiroff and Charlotte Zaltzberg is perhaps even better than the play. It retains all of Miss Hansberry’s finest dramatic encounters with the dialogue, as cutting and as honest as ever, intact. But the shaping of the piece is slightly firmer and better." Later in the review he wrote: “In a sense the score (music by Judd Wolden and lyrics by Robert Brittan) for Raisin is not the most important aspect of the show…. You hardly notice this—or at least you only notice it in passing—not only because of the exceptionally superior book, but also the enormous strength of the staging and the performance.”

== Illness and death ==
During Raisin's run at Arena Stage, Zaltzberg was diagnosed with inoperable breast cancer. Her health declined immediately after Raisin's opening in October, and she died on February 24, 1974 at the age of 49. The Raisin cast, crew, and producers participated in a memorial for her. The cast sang songs from the show, including the song “Measure the Valleys.”

After her death, Nemiroff wrote a letter to investors in which he informed those who were not aware that Zaltzberg had died. He wrote: “She was a woman of enormous talent and unfailing zest, with a rare and extraordinary competence appreciated by all who knew and loved her. There is a void that cannot be filled, but we will carry on in the tradition of unflagging spirit which Charlotte reflected. To Be Young, Gifted and Black; Sidney Brustein; Les Blancs: and now Raisin—to all of which she gave her creativity—are monuments to that spirit.”
