= Virginia Capers =

American actress (1925–2004)

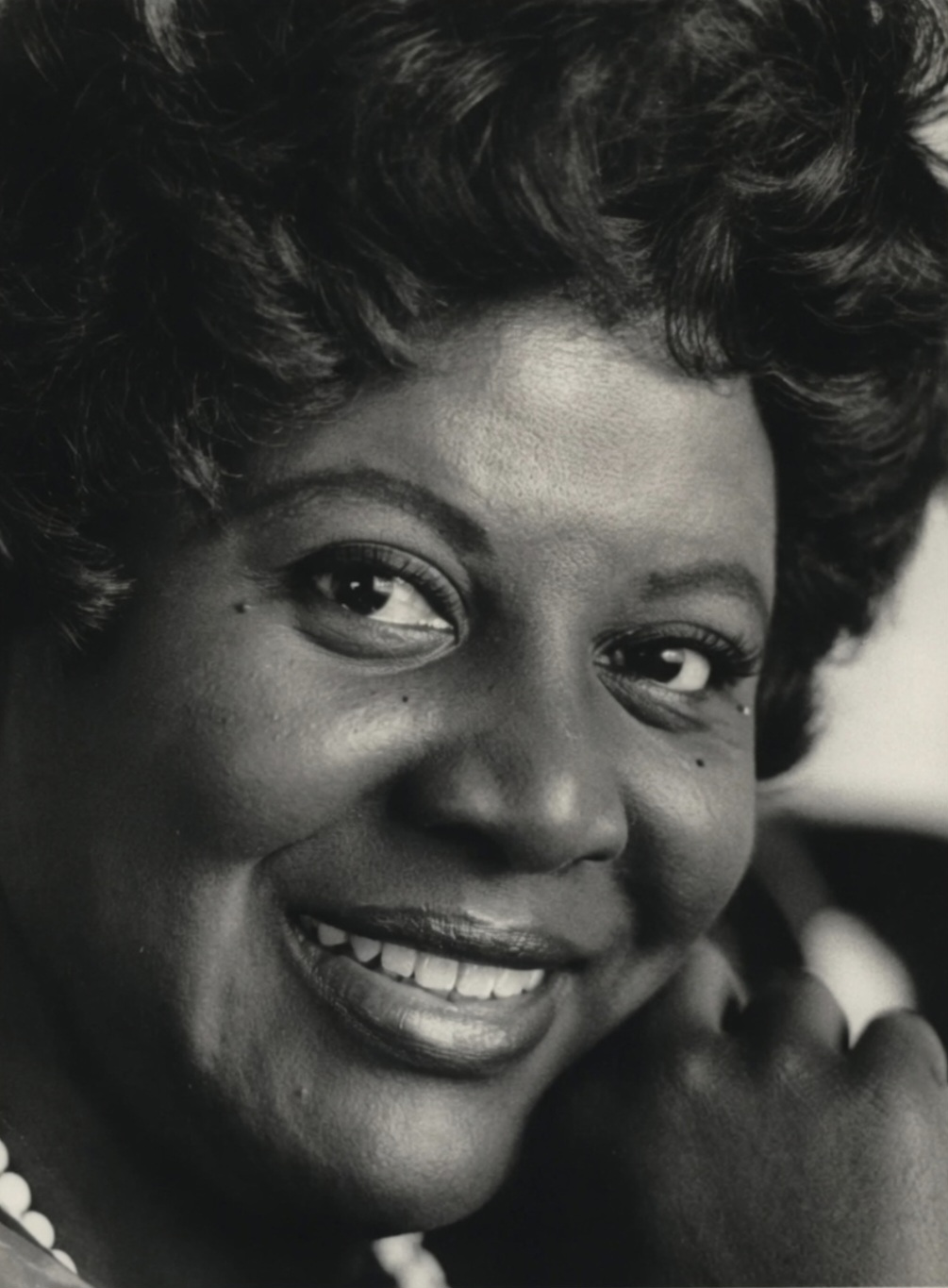
- Capers in 1974
- Born: Eliza Capers; September 22, 1925; Sumter, South Carolina, U.S.
- Died: May 6, 2004 (aged 78); Los Angeles, California, U.S.
- Occupation: Actress
- Years active: 1957–2003
- Children: 1

Virginia Capers (born Eliza Capers; September 22, 1925 – May 6, 2004) was an American actress. She won the Tony Award for Best Lead Actress in a Musical in 1974 for her performance as Lena Younger in Raisin, a musical version of Lorraine Hansberry's play A Raisin in the Sun.

== Career ==
She made her Broadway debut in the musical Jamaica in 1957 as a replacement for Adelaide Hall in the role of Grandma Obeah, taking over the role when Hall left the musical. Capers went on to appear in Saratoga and Raisin.

Capers was a familiar face to television audiences. In addition to a recurring role on The Fresh Prince of Bel-Air as Hattie Banks, she appeared in many television shows, including Have Gun – Will Travel, Dragnet, Marcus Welby, M.D., My Three Sons, Mannix, The Waltons, Mork & Mindy, Highway to Heaven, St. Elsewhere, Murder, She Wrote, Evening Shade, The Golden Girls, Unsub, Booker, Married... with Children, The Practice and ER.

Capers appeared in such films as Norwood (1970), The Great White Hope (1970), Lady Sings the Blues (1972), The North Avenue Irregulars (1979), The Toy (1982), Teachers (1984), Howard the Duck (1986), Ferris Bueller's Day Off (1986), Beethoven's 2nd (1993) and What's Love Got to Do with It (1993).

Capers founded the Lafayette Players, a Los Angeles repertory theatre company for African-American performers. She was the recipient of the National Black Theatre Festival Living Legend Award, the Paul Robeson Pioneer Award, and the NAACP Image Award for theatre excellence.

Capers provided the narration for the 1993 adventure game Gabriel Knight: Sins of the Fathers. For her performance, she won Computer Gaming World's award for Best Female Voice-Over Acting; the editors had expected to give the award to someone portraying a specific character but were "totally overwhelmed" by Capers as the narrator, stating that "Her performance alone makes it worthwhile to purchase the CD version" (as voice acting is absent from some versions of the game).

== Death ==
Capers died on May 6, 2004, of complications from pneumonia in Los Angeles, aged 78.

== Filmography ==
=== Film and television ===
Year	Title	Role	Notes
1962	House of Women	Sarah	
1967	The Ride to Hangman's Tree	Teresa Moreno	Uncredited
1969	The Lost Man	Theresa	
1970	There Was a Crooked Man...	Cook	Uncredited
1970	Norwood	Ernestine	
1970	The Great White Hope	Sister Pearl	
1971	Support Your Local Gunfighter	Effie	
1971	Big Jake	Delilah	
1971	The Late Liz	Martha	
1972	Lady Sings the Blues	Mama Holiday	
1972	Trouble Man	Macy	
1973	The World's Greatest Athlete	Native Woman	
1973	Five on the Black Hand Side	Ruby	
1979	The North Avenue Irregulars	Cleo	
1982	The Toy	Ruby Simpson	
1984	Teachers	Landlady	
1984	Highway to Heaven	Miss Hendrickson	
1985	Da Capo	Da Capo	
1986	Jo Jo Dancer, Your Life Is Calling	Emma Ray	
1986	Ferris Bueller's Day Off	Florence Sparrow	
1986	Howard the Duck	Cora Mae, Secretary	
1987	Off the Mark	Velma	
1988	Backfire	Maxine	
1988	The Golden Girls	Greta Wagner	
1990	The Fresh Prince of Bel-Air	Hattie "Grandma" Banks	6 episodes
1990	Pacific Palisades	Shirley	
1992	Batman: The Animated Series	Judge	(voice only)
1993	What's Love Got to Do with It	Choir Mistress	
1993	Knots Landing	Adele Carter	3 episodes
1993	Beethoven's 2nd	Miss Linda Anderson	
1995	A Last Goodbye	The Principal	
1995	Truman	Elizabeth Moore	
1997	The Practice		
1999	Bad City Blues	Mrs. Green	
2001	ER	Mrs. Wilson	2 episodes

=== Video games ===
Year	Title	Role
1993	Gabriel Knight: Sins of the Fathers	Narrator
