= Joe Morton =

American actor (born 1947)

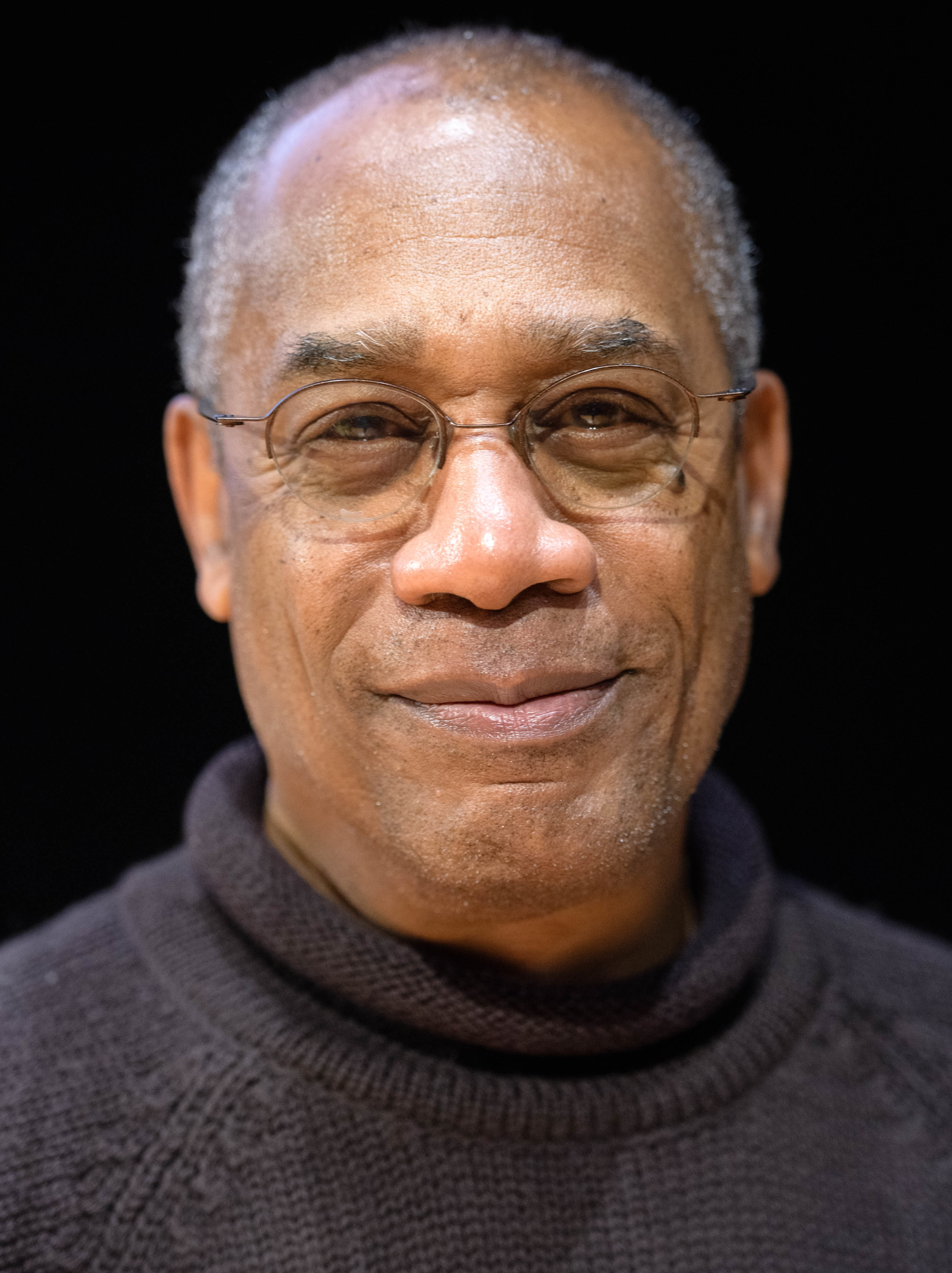
- Morton in 2019
- Born: Joseph Thomas Morton Jr. October 18, 1947 (age 79); New York City, U.S.
- Education: Hofstra University
- Occupation: Actor
- Years active: 1970–present
- Spouse: Nora Chavooshian (m. 1985; div. 2006)
- Children: 3

Joseph Thomas Morton Jr. (born October 18, 1947) is an American actor. Known as a character actor for his numerous roles on stage, television and film, he has received several awards including a Primetime Emmy Award as well as a nomination for a Tony Award.

He has collaborated with film director John Sayles three times, acting in his films The Brother from Another Planet (1984), City of Hope (1991) and Lone Star (1996). Other films he has appeared in include ...And Justice for All (1979), Terminator 2: Judgment Day (1991), Of Mice and Men (1992), Speed (1994), Apt Pupil (1998), Blues Brothers 2000 (1998), What Lies Beneath (2000), Ali (2001), Paycheck (2003), Stealth (2005), American Gangster (2007), Batman v Superman: Dawn of Justice (2016), Justice League (2017), and Zack Snyder's Justice League (2021).

His television work includes his role as Eli Pope, Olivia Pope's father, in Scandal, for which he won the Primetime Emmy Award for Outstanding Guest Actor in a Drama Series in 2014, and the role of Henry Deacon on the TV series Eureka.

On stage, Morton made his Broadway debut in Two Gentlemen of Verona (1971). He received a nomination for the Tony Award for Best Actor in a Musical for his role in the musical Raisin (1973). He made his West End debut portraying Colin Powell in the David Hare play Stuff Happens (2004).

== Early life and education ==
Morton was born in Harlem, New York City, the son of Evelyn, a secretary, and Joseph Thomas Morton Sr., a U.S. Army intelligence officer. Because of his father's military service, he spent parts of his childhood in West Germany and Okinawa. When Morton was 10 years old, his father died. Morton was raised Catholic and attended a Catholic military school for a time. He was an altar boy and considered becoming a priest. Morton graduated from Andrew Jackson High School and studied drama at Hofstra University.

== Career ==
Morton made his Broadway debut in Hair, appeared in Salvation, and was nominated for a Tony Award for Raisin. He has appeared in over 70 films, including John Sayles' The Brother from Another Planet (as The Brother), Terminator 2: Judgment Day (as Dr. Miles Bennett Dyson) and Blues Brothers 2000 (as Cabel "Cab" Chamberlain, as the son of Curtis, played by Cab Calloway). He also played Police Lieutenant Herb "Mac" McMahon, in Speed. On daytime, Morton has had roles on Search for Tomorrow (1973–74), Another World (1983–84), and All My Children (2002). In 2002, he appeared on the London stage in the play Art.

Morton has made many notable TV guest appearances, including his appearances as Dr. Steven Hamilton in the first two seasons of Smallville. He starred in the Sanford and Son spin-off Grady (1975–76), M*A*S*H* (battalion aid surgeon Capt. Nick Saunders, 1976), Under One Roof (1995) and E-Ring (2005). He portrayed the jack-of-all-trades scientist Henry Deacon as a regular on Syfy Channel's Eureka (2006–12). Morton played the role of Eli Pope on the hit drama Scandal, a role for which he received the Primetime Emmy Award for Outstanding Guest Actor in a Drama Series.

In 2016, Morton portrayed the activist and comedian Dick Gregory in the play Turn Me Loose at the Westside Theatre in Manhattan. Morton portrayed Dr. Silas Stone, father of Victor Stone/Cyborg, in a cameo role in the 2016 film Batman v Superman: Dawn of Justice, part of the DC Extended Universe. He reprised the character in the film Justice League (2017) and more extensively in its director's cut.

From 2018 to 2020, Morton co-starred as Reverend Arthur Finer in the CBS series God Friended Me. Morton directed three episodes of God Friended Me, and has directing credits for four other TV series.

== Personal life ==
A few years before filming Terminator 2, Morton was injured in a car crash and suffered a punctured lung. After he demonstrated its effects on his breathing to director James Cameron, Cameron decided to integrate that into Morton's character's death scene in the movie.

== Filmography ==
=== Film ===
Year	Title	Role	Notes
1977	Between the Lines	Ahmed	
1979	...And Justice for All	Prison Doctor	
1982	The Clairvoyant	Detective Rich	
1983	Curse of the Pink Panther	Charlie	
1984	The Brother from Another Planet	The Brother	
1985	Trouble in Mind	Solo	
1986	Crossroads	Scratch's assistant	
1987	Stranded	Sheriff McMahon	
1988	Zelly and Me	Earl	
1988	The Good Mother	Frank Williams	
1989	Tap	Nicky	
1990	The Lost Platoon	World War II Soldier	
1991	City of Hope	Wynn	
1991	Terminator 2: Judgment Day	Dr. Miles Bennett Dyson	
1992	Of Mice and Men	Crooks	
1992	Forever Young	Cameron	
1994	The Inkwell	Kenny Tate	
1994	Speed	Lieutenant Herb "Mac" McMahon	
1995	The Walking Dead	Sergeant Barkley	
1996	Lone Star	Delmore Payne	
1996	Executive Decision	Sergeant Campbell "Cappy" Matheny	
1997	The Pest	Mr. Kent	
1997	Speed 2: Cruise Control	Captain Herb "Mac" McMahon	
1997	Trouble on the Corner	Detective Bill	
1998	Blues Brothers 2000	Cabel Chamberlain	
1998	Apt Pupil	Dan Richler	
1998	When It Clicks	Cato Caldwell Douglass	Short
1999	The Astronaut's Wife	Sherman Reese	
2000	What Lies Beneath	Dr. Drayton	
2000	Bounce	Jim Weller	
2001	Ali	Chauncey Eskridge	
2002	Dragonfly	Hugh Campbell	
2003	Crossing	Uncle Stan	Short
2003	Paycheck	Agent Dodge	
2004	Breaking Dawn	Professor Simon	
2005	Back in the Day	Rev. James Packer	
2005	Stealth	Dick Marshfield	
2005	Lenny the Wonder Dog	Dr. Island	
2006	The Night Listener	Ashe	
2007	American Gangster	Charlie Williams	
2007	Badland	Max Astin	
2008	Wherever You Are	Dr. Livingston	
2009	La Linea	Hodges	
2010	The Mulberry Tree	Samuel R. Freeman	
2013	Home	Donald Hall	
2016	Batman v Superman: Dawn of Justice	Silas Stone	Cameo
2017	Justice League	Silas Stone	
2019	Godzilla: King of the Monsters	Houston Brooks	
2019	A Million Eyes	Fern	Short
2020	Trinity's Triumph	Monsignor Heck	
2021	Zack Snyder's Justice League	Silas Stone	Director's cut of Justice League

=== Television ===
Year	Title	Role	Notes
1970	Bracken's World	Yule Buford	Episode: "Love It or Leave It, Change It or Lose It"
1970	Mission: Impossible	Clerk	Episode: "Hunted"
1973–1974	Search for Tomorrow	Dr. James Foster	Main role
1975	Sanford and Son	Hal Marshall	Episode: "The Family Man"
1975–1976	Grady	Hal Marshall	Main role
1976	M*A*S*H	Captain Saunders	Episode: "Der Tag"
1976	What's Happening!!	Department Store Manager	Episode: "The Birthday Present"
1978	Lawman Without a Gun	Louis	Television film
1978	Watch Your Mouth	Raymond Geeter	Main role
1979	Guiding Light	Dan Stennis	Episode: "Episode #1.8295"
1980	Death Penalty	William Terry	Television film
1981	We're Fighting Back	Elgin Jones	Television film
1983	American Playhouse	Carl Hatch	Recurring: season 2
1983	Another World	Dr. Abel Marsh	Main role
1984	A Good Sport	-	Television film
1985	Miami Vice	Lt. Jack Davis	Episode: "The Maze"
1986	Who's the Boss?	Limo Driver	Episode: "Mona's Limo"
1987–1989	The Equalizer	Slate / Carter Brock	4 episodes
1988	Terrorist on Trial: The United States vs. Salim Ajami	Tandy	Television film
1988	Alone in the Neon Jungle	Ken Fraker	Television film
1988	Police Story: Burnout	Sgt. Jeff Allen	Television film
1989	A Man Called Hawk	Rev. Marvin Lewis	Episode: "Choice of Chance"
1989	One Life to Live	Judge Romero	Episode: "Episode dated 22 May 1989"
1989	Howard Beach: Making The Case for Murder	Cedric Sandiford	Television film
1990	Challenger	Dr. Ronald McNair	Television film
1990–1991	Equal Justice	Mike James	Main role
1992	Legacy of Lies	Samuel Flowers	Television film
1992	A Different World	Byron Douglas III	Recurring: season 5
1992, 2000–2005	Law & Order	Roland Books / Leon Chiles	Guest: season 3; recurring: seasons 10 & 11, 14 & 15
1993	TriBeCa	Carlton Thomas	Main role
1994	Homicide: Life on the Street	Sam Thorn	2 episodes
1994	New York Undercover	Dean/Dinah	Episode: "Blondes Have More Fun"
1995	In the Shadow of Evil	Lt. Royce	Television film
1995	Under One Roof	Ron Langston	Main role
1995	New York News	Mitch Cotter	Episode: "Fun City"
1996	Nova	Narrator	Episode: "Shark Attack!"
1996	Jack Reed: Death and Vengeance	Gordon Thomas	Television film
1996, 2002	Touched by an Angel	Jake Stone / Martin	2 episodes
1997	Prince Street	Lieutenant Tom Warner	Main role
1997	Miss Evers' Boys	Dr. Sam Brodus	Television film
1998	Dellaventura	Councilman Caulder	Episode: "David & Goliath"
1998–1999	Mercy Point	Dr. Grote Maxwell	Main role
1999	Mutiny	Thurgood Marshall	Television film
1999	Y2K	Martin Lowell	Television film
2000	Ali: An American Hero	Malcolm X	Television film
2000	The X-Files	Martin Wells	Episode: "Redrum"
2001–2002	Smallville	Steven Hamilton	Recurring: season 1; guest: season 2
2002	All My Children	Zeke McMillan	Episode: "#1.8387"
2002	The Practice	U.S. Attorney	Episode: "Fire Proof"
2002	The Fritz Pollard Story	Host	Television film
2003	Jasper, Texas	Walter Diggles	Television film
2003	Law & Order: Special Victims Unit	Ray Bevins	Episode: "Grief"
2003	Thoughtcrimes	John Harper	Television film
2004	Whoopi	Martin James	Episode: "Sins of the Sister"
2004	The Jury	James Byron Milton	Episode: "Last Rites"
2005	Gone But Not Forgotten	Reggie Stewart	Television film
2005	House	Senator Gary H. Wright	Episode: "Role Model"
2005	JAG	Elroy Johnson	Episode: "Unknown Soldier"
2005	CSI: NY	Chief Dwight Hillborne	2 episodes
2005–2006	E-Ring	Steve Algazi	Recurring
2006–2012	Eureka	Henry Deacon	Main role
2007	Numbers	Reporter	Episode: "Graphic"
2008	Boston Legal	Attorney Steve Duprey	Episode: "Indecent Proposals"
2009	Great Performances	Eugene Bullard	Episode: "Harlem in Montmartre: A Paris Jazz Story"
2009	Warehouse 13	Reverend John Hill	Episode: "Regrets"
2009	Brothers & Sisters	Peter Madsen	2 episodes
2009–2011	The Good Wife	Daniel Golden	Recurring: season 1; guest: season 3
2010	White Collar	Kyle Bancroft	Episode: "Prisoner's Dilemma"
2012	Coma	Dr. Nelson	Episode: "Part One & Two"
2013–2018	Scandal	Eli Rowan Pope	Recurring: seasons 2–4; main: seasons 5–7
2015	Cleveland Abduction	Agent Solano	Television film
2015	Proof	Dr. Charles Richmond	Main role
2015–2016	Grace and Frankie	Jason	2 episodes
2016	All the Way	Roy Wilkins	Television film
2018–2020	God Friended Me	Rev. Arthur Finer	Main role
2019–2020	The Politician	Marcus	Guest: season 1; recurring: season 2
2021	Hemingway	Ralph Ellison (voice)	Episode: "The Avatar (1929-1944)"
2021–2022	Our Kind of People	Teddy Franklin	Main role
2022	Benjamin Franklin	William Bradford (voice)	Episode: "An American (1775-1790)"
2025	The American Revolution	Elias Dayton (voice)	3 episodes
2025–2026	Going Dutch	General Davidson	11 episodes
2026	Star Trek: Strange New Worlds	Simon Reeger	Episode: "Orders of Magnitude"
2026	A Different World	Byron Douglas III	2 episodes
2026	Cupertino	Bayard	Upcoming series
TBA	The Best of Us		Upcoming series

=== Theater ===
Year	Title	Role	Venue	Ref.
1971	Two Gentlemen of Verona	Valentine (replacement)	St. James Theatre, Broadway	
1973	Tricks	Arlecchino	Alvin Theatre, Broadway	
1973	Raisin	Walter Lee Younger	46th Street Theater, Broadway	
1981	Oh, Brother!	Eastern Habim	ANTA Theater, Broadway	
1986	Honky Tonk Nights	Barney Walker	Biltmore Theatre, Broadway	
1998	Art	Serge (replacement)	Royale Theatre, Broadway	
2004	Stuff Happens	Colin Powell	National Theater, London	
2016	Turn Me Loose	Dick Gregory	Westside Theatre	
2017	Turn Me Loose	Dick Gregory	Wallis Annenberg Center for the Performing Arts	

=== Audio ===
Year	Title	Role	Notes
2010	Invisible Man	Narrator	
2019	The Water Dancer	Narrator	
2021	Marvel's Wastelanders: Hawkeye	Ringmaster	
2024	Worst Case Scenario	Narrator	Authored by T. J. Newman

== Awards and nominations ==
Year	Association	Category	Nominated work	Result
1974	Tony Award	Best Actor in a Musical	Raisin	Nominated
1974	Theatre World Award		Raisin	Honoree
1991	Fangoria Chainsaw Awards	Best Supporting Actor	Terminator 2: Judgment Day	Nominated
2008	Screen Actors Guild Awards	Outstanding Performance by a Cast in a Motion Picture	American Gangster	Nominated
2014	Critics' Choice Television Awards	Best Guest Performer in a Drama Series	Scandal	Nominated
2014	Primetime Emmy Awards	Outstanding Guest Actor in a Drama Series	Scandal	Won
2014	NAACP Image Awards	Outstanding Supporting Actor in a Drama Series	Scandal	Won
2015	NAACP Image Awards	Outstanding Supporting Actor in a Drama Series	Scandal	Won
2016	NAACP Image Awards	Outstanding Supporting Actor in a Drama Series	Scandal	Won
2017	NAACP Image Awards	Outstanding Supporting Actor in a Drama Series	Scandal	Nominated
2018	Los Angeles Drama Critics Circle Awards	Lead Performance in a Play	Turn Me Loose	Won
2020	Audie Award	Literary Fiction and Classics	The Water Dancer	Won

== See also ==
- List of people from Harlem
