= Judd Woldin =

American composer (1925–2011)

- Born: Edwin Judd Woldin; May 30, 1925; Somerville, New Jersey
- Died: November 27, 2011 (aged 86) Manhattan, New York
- Genre: Musical theatre
- Occupation: Composer

Judd Woldin (May 30, 1925 – November 27, 2011) was an American composer, most notable for his musical Raisin.

== Biography ==
Edwin Judd Woldin was born in Somerville, New Jersey. At the age of eight, he began taking piano lessons. In high school, he was attracted to Jazz, and was even working professionally at the time.

He attended Rutgers University, and received his B.A. in 1958 and his M.A. in 1960. He had started a doctoral program at Columbia University, but left to write the dance music for a Broadway musical based on James Thurber's Fables for Our Time and Famous Poems Illustrated. After having toured with Don Elliott and then Lionel Hampton, Woldin attended Black Mountain College, studying painting with Josef Albers and composition with Heinrich Jalowetz. He then attended the University of New Mexico to study 12-tone music with Ernst Krenek (the composer of Johnny Spielt Auf.

Woldin then joined the BMI Lehman Engel Musical Theater Workshop, where he met and began collaborating with Robert Brittan. There they would begin work on a musical version of Lorraine Hansberry's play A Raisin In The Sun. The result was Raisin. It premiered May 30, 1973 at the Arena Stage in Washington, D.C. and would move to Broadway at the 46th Street Theatre on October 18, 1973, transferred to the Lunt-Fontanne Theatre on January 13, 1975, and closed on December 8, 1975 after 847 performances. The show won a Tony and a Grammy for Best Musical and Best Original Score From a Musical. (Woldin is credited with the music and Brittan the lyrics, but Woldin felt that they should have shared both credits as the process was very collaborative.)

His other work includes Petticoat Lane, loosely based on the novella King of Schnorrers by Israel Zangwill, which premiered at the George Street Playhouse in October 1978, and would move to the Harold Clurman Theatre on October 4, 1979.

Lorenzo, a musical based on Mozart librettist Lorenzo Da Ponte, premiered at the George Street Playhouse in 1982. It was co-written by Richard Engquist.

Little Ham was written with Daniel Owens and Engquist as well, and is based on Langston Hughes' play of the same name, and would be premiered at the George Street Playhouse in 1987 and would also play at the Westport Country Playhouse. It also was produced by Amas Musical Theatre at the Hudson Guild in 2002.

In 1992, a concert version of Jonah, about the Jonah from the Old Testament, was presented at the Merkin Concert Hall and part of a festival of Jewish music presented by Jack Gottlieb. It would also be produced at the York Theatre in 2004.

The Prince and The Pauper, written with Marc Elliot, was based on Mark Twain's novel of the same name, and it ran at the Peninsula Civic Light Opera in San Mateo, California. It has also been produced at the Starlight Theatre in Kansas City, Missouri, the 5th Avenue Theatre in Seattle, Washington, and at the Ordway Center for the Performing Arts in Saint Paul, Minnesota.

Judd Woldin died after an eight-year bout with cancer on November 27, 2011, at the age of 86.

== Works ==
=== Musicals ===
- 1973 - Raisin (lyrics by Robert Brittan, book by Robert B. Nemiroff and Charlotte Zaltzberg)
- 1978 - Petticoat Lane
- 1982 - Lorenzo (co-librettist Richard Engquist)
- 1987 - Little Ham (co-librettist Engquist)
- 1992 - Jonah
- 1993 - The Prince and the Pauper (music by Woldin and Marc Elliot, lyrics by Elliot)

=== Play ===
- 2002 - Murder in Baker Street

=== Film scores ===
- 1962 - Railway with a Heart of Gold
- 1964 - Light Fantastic
- 1967 - Poppycock
- 1968 - Nobody Ever Died of Old Age

== Notes ==
Bibliography

- Contemporary Authors Online, Detroit: Gale, 2002, ISBN 978-0-7876-3995-2
