= Robert B. Nemiroff =

American theater producer and songwriter

- Born: October 29, 1929; New York City, New York, U.S.
- Died: July 18, 1991 (aged 61)
- Occupations: Theatre producer, book editor, songwriter
- Spouse(s): Lorraine Hansberry (m. 1953; div. 1962) Jewell Handy Gresham (1967)

Robert Barron Nemiroff (October 29, 1929, New York City – July 18, 1991) was an American theater producer and songwriter, and the husband of Lorraine Hansberry.

Nemiroff was a book editor and a music publisher, as well as an award-winning songwriter. With co-writer Burt D’Lugoff, he composed the 1956 hit song "Cindy, Oh Cindy", and "Fifteen", the theme for the movie The World, the Flesh, and the Devil.

He married Lorraine Hansberry in 1953, which Hansberry often cited as an important creative factor in the genesis of her play A Raisin in the Sun. Although the couple separated in 1957 and divorced in 1962, their personal and professional relationships lasted until Hansberry's death from cancer in January 1965.

In 1967, Nemiroff married Jewell Handy Gresham, a college professor who taught at Tuskegee Institute, New York University, Hofstra University, Nassau Community College, and Vassar College. He adopted her young daughter, Joi Gresham, when they married.

Nemiroff devoted much of his life to editing and promoting the work of Hansberry, who had named him as her literary executor. He was the executive producer of the 1989 PBS production of Hansberry's play, A Raisin in the Sun, and produced and co-wrote the 1973 Broadway musical Raisin, based on A Raisin in the Sun. His daughter, Joi Gresham, succeeded him as trustee of the work of Hansberry.

== Awards and honors ==
Nemiroff won the Tony Award for producing Raisin.
