= Ernestine Jackson =

American actress and singer (born 1942)

- Born: Ernestine Jackson; September 18, 1942 (age 84); Corpus Christi, Texas, U.S.
- Occupations: Actress; singer
- Years active: 1966–2011

Ernestine Jackson (born September 18, 1942) is an American actress and singer.

== Early life ==
Born in Corpus Christi, Texas, Jackson made her Broadway debut in 1967 as Irene Molloy in the all-black cast of Hello, Dolly! starring Pearl Bailey.

== Career ==
In 1973, Jackson originated the role of Ruth Younger in Raisin, her performance winning her the Theatre World Award and a nomination for the Tony Award for Best Performance by a Featured Actress in a Musical. Additional Broadway credits include Applause, The Bacchae, and the 1976 all-black revival of Guys and Dolls, for which she was nominated for the Tony Award for Best Performance by a Leading Actress in a Musical and the Drama Desk Award for Outstanding Featured Actress in a Musical. She also appeared in the 1966 revival of Show Boat at the New York State Theater and the 1967 revival of Finian's Rainbow at New York City Center.

Jackson portrayed Alberta Hunter in Cookin' at the Cookery: The Music and Times of Alberta Hunter, a revue that originated at the Hippodrome State Theatre in Gainesville, Florida in 1997 and then played in various venues in the United States, such as the Lyceum Stage, San Diego, California in March and April 2003. Jackson appeared in the revue at the Boston University Theatre, presented by the Huntington Theatre Company, in June 2003.

She portrayed Billie Holiday in the 2005 Long Wharf Theatre (Connecticut) production of Lady Day at Emerson's Bar and Grill. In reviewing her performance, Frank Rizzo of Variety said she "nicely suggests rather than mimics the famous Holiday" and added, "Jackson handles the gliding jazz minimalism beautifully. She makes Holiday's fleeting happiness a joy and her suffering an art." In 2007 she portrayed entertainer Ethel Waters in Ethel Waters: His Eye is On the Sparrow at the Bristol Riverside Theatre in Bristol, Pennsylvania. Jackson's feature films include The Bonfire of the Vanities, Freedomland, Steam, and Forged, scheduled for release in 2010. On television she has appeared in Roots: The Next Generations, A Man Called Hawk, Law & Order, The West Wing, and Law & Order: Criminal Intent.

== Filmography ==
=== Film ===
Year	Title	Role	Notes
1975	Aaron Loves Angela	Cleo	
1982	Homework	Cookie's Mother	
1990	The Bonfire of the Vanities	Media Jackal	
1996	Girls Town	Nikki's Mom	
2006	Freedomland	Nurse	
2007	Steam	Nurse	
2010	Forged	Old Woman	
TBA	Finding Home	Grandmother	

=== Television ===
Year	Title	Role	Notes
1979	Roots: The Next Generations	Lady	Episode: "Part IV (1918-1921)"
1989	A Man Called Hawk	Mrs. Carver	Episode: "Choice of Chance"
1994	Law & Order	Vanessa Petrie	Episode: "Wager"
1996	Swift Justice	Mama Em	Episode: "Takin' Back the Street"
2000	D.C.	Audra Freeman	Episode: "Justice"
2002	10,000 Black Men Named George	Mrs. Randolph	Television film
2002	The West Wing	Fiona, Diner Owner	Episode: "20 Hours in America"
2003	Law & Order: Criminal Intent	Agnes Bates	Episode: "Stray"
2010	Gravity	Middle Aged Woman	Episode: "Damn Skippy"
2010	Rescue Me	Elderly Black Woman	Episode: "Cowboy"
2010	The Big C	Church Mom	Episode: "Divine Intervention"

=== Stage ===
Year	Title	Role	Notes
1966	Show Boat	Female Singer	O'Keefe Centre for the Performing Arts
1966	Show Boat	Female Singer	New York State Theatre, Off-Broadway
1967	Finian's Rainbow	Singer	New York City Center, Off-Broadway
1967	Hello, Dolly!	Irene Molloy (Replacement)	St. James Theatre, Broadway
1970	Applause	Singer	Palace Theatre, Broadway
1971	Jesus Christ Superstar	Ensemble	National Tour
1973	Tricks	Ernestina	Alvin Theatre, Broadway
1973	Raisin	Ruth Younger	46th Street Theatre, Broadway
1976	Guys and Dolls	Adelaide	Broadway Theatre, Broadway
1980	The Bacchae	Chorus of Bacchae	Circle in the Square Theatre, Broadway
1981	Louis	Lil Hardin	New Federal Theatre, Off-Broadway
1984	Rap Master Ronnie	Performer	Village Gate Upstairs, Off-Broadway
1985	Jack and Jill	Jill Donovan	Riverwest Theatre
1986	Black Girl	Mama Rosie	Second Stage Theater, Off-Broadway
1986	Brownstone	Mary	Roundabout Theatre Company, Off-Broadway
1988	Joe Turner's Come and Gone	Bertha Holly (Standby)	Ethel Barrymore Theatre, Broadway
1992	Into the Woods	Jack's Mother	Walnut Street Playhouse
1994	Aladdin	The Astrologer	Asian Tour
1994	South Pacific	Bloody Mary	North Shore Music Theatre
1996	A Grand Night for Singing	Ernestine	North Shore Music Theatre
1998	Woody Guthrie's American Song	Performer	Melting Pot Theatre
2001	Storyville	Countess Dolly	Shores Theater of Performing Arts
2003	Cookin' at the Cookery: The Music and Times of Alberta Hunter	Alberta Hunter	National Tour
2005	Lady Day at Emerson's Bar and Grill	Billie Holiday	Long Wharf Theatre
2007	Ethel Waters: His Eye is On the Sparrow	Ethel Waters	Bristol Riverside Theatre
2008	Carousel	Dr. Seldon/Starkeeper/Nettie Fowler	Long Wharf Theatre
2012	Lost in the Stars	Grace Kumalo	Glimmerglass Festival
2014	Me and Caesar Lee	Lorraine	The Midtown International Theatre Festival

=== Video games ===
Year	Title	Role
1983	MysteryDisc: Many Roads to Murder	Juna Jamael
1999	Mugen	Voice
