= Look Homeward, Angel (play) =

1957 play by Ketti Frings

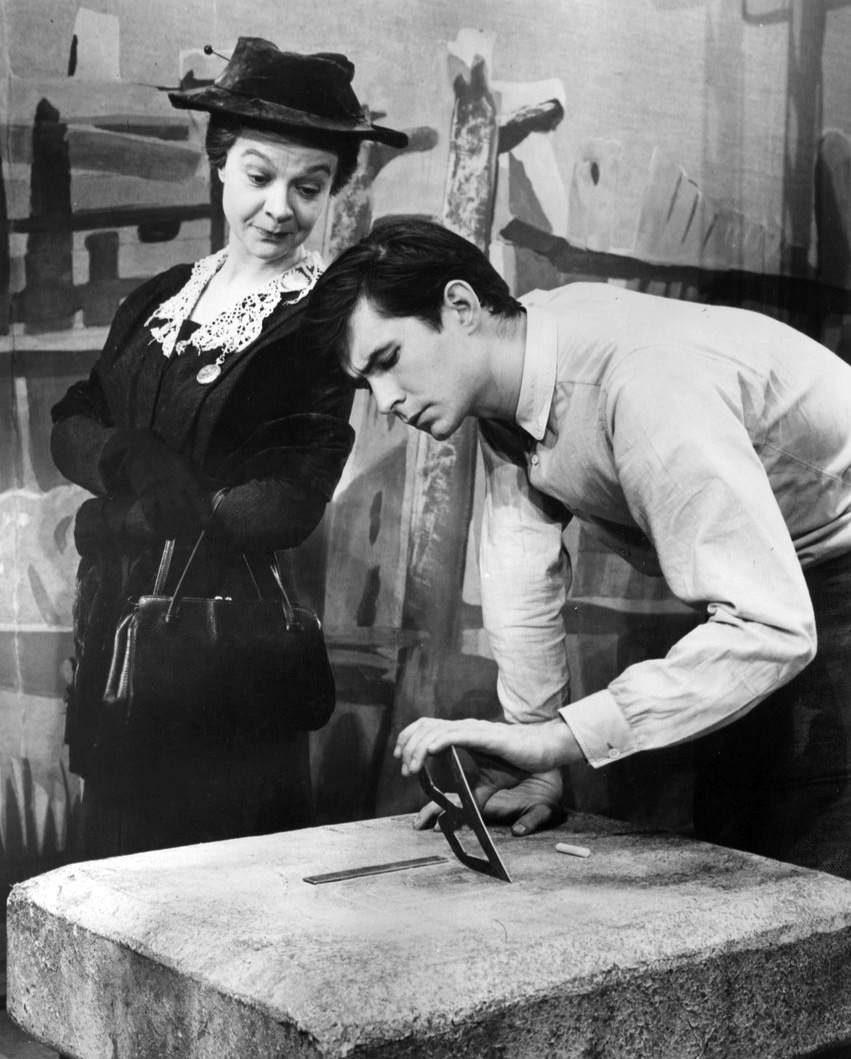
- Jo Van Fleet and Anthony Perkins in the original Broadway production of Look Homeward, Angel
- Original language: English
- Written by: Ketti Frings
- Characters: Eugene Gant; Eliza Gant; W.O. Gant
- Genre: Drama
- Setting: Altamont, North Carolina, in 1916

Premiere
- Date: November 28, 1957
- Place: Ethel Barrymore Theatre, New York City

Look Homeward, Angel is a 1957 stage play by the playwright Ketti Frings. The play is based on Thomas Wolfe's 1929 largely autobiographical novel of the same title.

== Production ==
Look Homeward, Angel opened on Broadway at the Ethel Barrymore Theatre on November 28, 1957, and ran for a total of 564 performances, closing on April 4, 1959, Anthony Perkins' 27th birthday. Directed by George Roy Hill, the cast starred Jo Van Fleet (who replaced Bette Davis during rehearsals after Davis broke her back at her home) and Anthony Perkins.

Ketti Frings won the 1958 Pulitzer Prize for Drama and the New York Drama Critics' Circle Award. The production received Tony Award nominations for Best Play; Best Actor in a Play (Hugh Griffith and Anthony Perkins); Best Actress in a Play (Jo Van Fleet); Best Scenic Design (Jo Mielziner); Best Costume Design (Motley); and Best Director (George Roy Hill).

John Drew Barrymore was to co-star with Miriam Hopkins in the tour of Look Homeward, Angel, which was set to open in Wilmington, Delaware, on October 21, 1959, but Barrymore, who was said to be suffering from a skin infection and was underweight, quit the touring company during rehearsals. He was replaced by Jonathan Bolt.

== Synopsis ==
Look Homeward, Angel traces the coming of age of Eugene Gant, as well as the lives of his family members. It takes place in the town of Altamont, North Carolina. Eugene's mother, Eliza, runs a boarding house, "Dixieland", where boarders often interact with and affect the lives of the Gants. His father, William Oliver, runs a marble sculpture shop, where his prized possession, a statue of an angel, is kept.

The play begins by showing life in the boarding house when a young woman, Laura enters and requests to stay there. Gant enters drunk, but is eventually helped by his daughter, Helen. The next scene sees Eugene and his brother, Ben, discussing life and love. Eugene meets Laura, and they appear to fall in love, though Eugene lies about his age, claiming to be older. Eliza and Gant fight over the matter of selling his shop and the angel statue. Eliza enters the boarding house and begins arguing with Ben, cumulating in her slapping him. The next scene, days later, sees Gant and Eugene working in his shop. Laura enters to confront Eugene about the truth—she has lied about her age and he has as well. Eliza enters, ready to sell Gant's shop, until he at last announces that rather than use the money for Dixieland's expenses, he would take the money, put Gene in college, and begin traveling. Eliza rips up his check in a fit of fury and exits. Immediately following, Ben falls ill. He is then seen on his deathbed, where he dies.

The third act opens with Eugene and Laura in their bedroom.

== Opening night cast ==
- Hugh Griffith as W.O. Gant
- Anthony Perkins as Eugene Gant
- Jo Van Fleet as Eliza Gant
- Arthur Hill as Ben Gant
- Frances Hyland as Laura James
- Joseph Bernard as Jake Clatt
- Clifford Cothren as Hugh Barton
- Mary Farrell as Mrs. Clatt
- Julia Johnston as Mrs. Snowden
- Victor Kilian as Dr. McGuire
- Elizabeth Lawrence as Florry Mangle
- Dwight Marfield as Mr. Farrell
- Rosemary Murphy as Helen Gant Barton
- Bibi Osterwald as Madame Elizabeth
- Tom Flatley Reynolds as Will Pentland
- Jack Sheehan as Tarkinton
- Leonard Stone as Hugh Barton
- Arthur Storch as Luke Gant
- Florence Sundstrom as Mrs. Marie "Fatty" Pert
- Susan Torrey as Miss Brown

== Musical adaptation ==
Frings' stage adaptation of Look Homeward, Angel was readapted as a Broadway musical, Angel, which opened at the Minskoff Theatre in New York on May 4, 1978, and closed May 13 after five performances and poor reviews. Frings co-wrote the book with the show's lyricist, Peter Udell, whose lyrics were set to music by Gary Geld. This songwriting team had created the musicals Shenandoah and Purlie and penned the hit song "Sealed with a Kiss."

Angel was directed by Philip Rose and choreographed by Robert Tucker. The production featured costumes by Pearl Somner, lighting design by John Gleason and scenery by Ming Cho Lee.

Frances Sternhagen received a nomination for the 1978 Tony Award for Best Leading Actress in a Musical, and Joel Higgins was nominated for a 1978 Drama Desk Award for Outstanding Featured Actor in a Musical.

== Awards and nominations ==
=== Original Broadway production ===
Year	Award	Category	Nominee	Result
1958	Tony Award	Best Play		Nominated
1958	Tony Award	Best Actor in a Play	Hugh Griffith	Nominated
1958	Tony Award	Best Actor in a Play	Anthony Perkins	Nominated
1958	Tony Award	Best Actress in a Play	Jo Van Fleet	Nominated
1958	Tony Award	Best Director	George Roy Hill	Nominated
1958	Tony Award	Best Scenic Design	Jo Mielziner	Nominated
1958	Tony Award	Best Costume Design	Motley	Nominated
1958	Pulitzer Prize	Drama	Ketti Frings	Won
1958	New York Drama Critics' Circle Award	Best Play		Won
