= Sternhagen =

Sternhagen may refer to:

== Places ==
- Röpersdorf/Sternhagen, district of Nordwestuckermark, municipality in Brandenburg, Germany
- Sternhagen, district of Velgast, municipality in Mecklenburg-Vorpommern, Germany

== Personal name ==
- Frances Sternhagen (1930–2023), American actress
- John M. Sternhagen (1888–1954), American jurist, member of the US Board of Tax Appeals and judge of the Tax Court of the United States
