= Janusz Stokłosa =

Polish pianist and composer (born 1954)

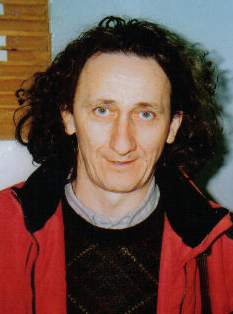
- Born: May 15, 1954 (age 72); Rabka, Poland
- Education: Jagiellonian University, Kraków
- Known for: Metro
- Awards: Medal for Merit to Culture – Gloria Artis (Poland)
- Website: stoklosa.art.pl

Janusz Stokłosa (born 15 May 1954) is a Polish pianist and composer.

== Bio ==
He graduated from the Department of Music Theory and History at the Jagiellonian University in Kraków (1978). He has composed numerous scores for theatre and film. He made his debut at Kraków’s STU Theatre, composing the music for the production Pacjenci —based on Mikhail Bulgakov’s The Master and Margarita—directed by Krzysztof Jasiński (1976).

From 1984 to 1990, he served as the music director of the Ateneum Theatre in Warsaw, where he collaborated with Wojciech Młynarski and Janusz Józefowicz on productions such as Brel, Hemar, Wysocki. Between 1986 and 1991, he collaborated with Michał Bajor, touring with him across Europe, the USA, and Canada.

In 1991, he composed the music for the musical Metro, directed and choreographed by Janusz Józefowicz. The musical achieved spectacular success in Poland. Its American premiere took place on April 16, 1992, at the Minskoff Theatre on Broadway. By December 2023, over 2,500 performances had been staged. Stokłosa received a Tony Award nomination for the Metro score in the "Best Original Score" category for the 1991/1992 season. The musical's soundtrack achieved gold status in February 1994, platinum in November 1997, and double platinum on May 30, 1998.

Between 1990 and 2004, Stokłosa collaborated with the following theaters abroad: Schauspielhaus (Zurich), Akademietheater (Vienna), Burgtheater (Vienna), Teatr Kreatur (Berlin), Deutsches Theater (Berlin), Schaubühne (Berlin), Volksbühne (Berlin), and Bremer Theater (Bremen). In October 1992, he became the president of the company Studio Buffo. That same year, he founded the music and sheet music publishing house Stokłosa Editions.

He served as the musical director for the television programs MdM, Przebojowa noc, and Złota sobota.

In 2002, the film N. Winton – The Power of Good (directed by M. Minac), featuring music by Stokłosa, won an Emmy Award. In 2004, he composed the music for the musical Romeo and Juliet (based on Shakespeare) and for the musical Panna Tutli Putli by Witkacy. Since 2006, serving as conductor and artistic director, he has led the gala Christmas concerts organized by Polpharma at the Cistercian Cathedral in Pelplin, featuring prominent stars of Polish opera and the popular music stage.

In December 2011, the musical Polita (libretto by Agata Miklaszewska, directed by Janusz Józefowicz)—based on the life and career of Pola Negri—premiered in Warsaw. It marked the world's first use of 3D film technology in a musical. In December 2013, the Russian version of the musical, titled Pola Negri, premiered in Saint Petersburg. In 2023, the musical The Master and Margarita, directed by Janusz Józefowicz with music by Janusz Stokłosa, premiered at the Studio Buffo Theatre.

On May 22, the world premiere of the performance Let’s Dance Chopin (Zatańczmy Chopina) took place at Expo 2010 in Shanghai; Janusz Stokłosa served as its artistic director, conductor, and composer. The production was directed and choreographed by Stokłosa’s daughter, Maria Stokłosa.

Janusz Stokłosa is also an aviator. He obtained his Class III glider pilot rating in 1999, a Private Pilot License (PPL) in 2002, a night flight rating in 2005, a multi-engine (ME) rating in 2006, and a Commercial Pilot License (CPL) with an instrument rating (IR) in 2008.

== Career ==
=== Discography ===
- De Blijde Intrede van Kristus in Brussel
- Songs of the STU Theatre
- Janusz Stokłosa
- J. Stokłosa – D. Giesing
- Teatr Kreatur – autorski teatr Andrzeja Worona
- Metro – musical
- Music for the third installment of the Ekstradycja series
- Music CD for the film Pułapka
- Peter Pan – musical
- Romeo and Juliet – musical
- Polita – musical
- The Master and Margarita - musical

=== Film music ===
- Znaki zodiaku (1978, reż. Gerard Zalewski, Film Polski)
- Terrarium (1979, reż. Andrzej Titkow, TVP Warszawa)
- Ciosy (1980, reż. G. Zalewski, Film Polski)
- The legend of white horse (1986, reż. Jerzy Domaradzki i Janusz Morgenstern, Film Polski)
- Maskarada (1986, reż. Janusz Kijowski, Film Polski)
- W klatce (1987, reż. Barbara Sass-Zdort, Film Polski)
- Jedenaste przykazanie (1988, reż. Janusz Kondratiuk, TVP Warszawa)
- Prywatne niebo (1989, reż. J. Kondratiuk, TVP Warszawa)
- Rififi po sześćdziesiątce (1989, reż. Paweł Trzaska, TVP Warszawa)
- Szklany dom (1989, reż. Małgorzata Kopernik, TVP Wrocław)
- Wynajmę pokój… (1993, reż. A. Titkow, TVP Warszawa)
- Pułapka (1997, reż. Adek Drabiński, Film Polski)
- Jan Peszek w roli głównej (1998, reż. J. Kalina, TVP Warszawa)
- Ekstradycja 3 (1998, reż. Wojciech Wójcik, 10 – odcinkowy serial TVP Warszawa)
- Wszyscy moi bliscy (1999, reż. Matej Minac, InFilm Praha)
- N. Winton – The Power of Good (2001, reż. Matej Minac)
- Dylematu 5 (2006, reż. Grzegorz Warchoł)

Janusz Stokłosa is also the creator of the musical scores for dozens of theatrical productions and Television Theater Productions.
