= Angel (musical) =

- Broadway Playbill
- Music: Gary Geld
- Lyrics: Peter Udell
- Book: Peter Udell; Ketti Frings
- Basis: Thomas Wolfe novel Look Homeward, Angel
- Productions: 1978 Broadway

Angel is a Broadway musical that opened at the Minskoff Theatre in New York on May 4, 1978. It was based on Ketti Frings’ Pulitzer Prize winning 1957 theatrical adaptation of Thomas Wolfe's best-selling 1929 novel, Look Homeward, Angel.

The musical features songs with lyrics by Peter Udell and music by Gary Geld—the same team who created the musicals Shenandoah and Purlie. Frings and Udell collaborated on the book. Angel was directed by Philip Rose and choreographed by Robert Tucker. The production featured costumes by Pearl Somner, lighting design by John Gleason and scenery by Ming Cho Lee.

For her performance, Frances Sternhagen received a Tony Award nomination for Best Leading Actress in a Musical in 1978. Additionally, Joel Higgins was nominated for a 1978 Drama Desk Award for Outstanding Featured Actor in a Musical.

The musical was savaged by the critics, and closed on May 13 after only five performances.

== Original cast and characters ==
Character	Broadway (1978)
Eliza Gant	Frances Sternhagen
Eugene Gant	Don Scardino
W. O Gant	Fred Gwynne
Ben Gant	Joel Higgins
Laura James	Leslie Ann Ray
Dr. Maguire	Daniel Keyes
Fatty Pert	Patti Allison
Madame Victoria	Patricia Englund
Will Pentland	Elek Hartman
Miss Brown	Jayne Barnett
Helen Gant	Donna Davis

== Songs ==
Angel is set in Altamount, North Carolina in the fall of 1916. In Act One, the scene is set in the Dixieland Boarding House. In Act Two, Scene One is set in Gant's marble yard and shop; and Scenes Two and Three are set again in the Dixieland Boarding House.

Act One

- "Angel Theme" – Orchestra
- "All the Comforts of Home" – Boarders
- "Like the Eagles Fly" – Ben Gant
- "Make a Little Sunshine" – Eliza Gant, Eugene Gant, Ben Gant
- "Fingers and Toes" – W.O. Gant, Tim Laughran, Reed McKinney, Joe Tarkington
- "Fatty" – Ben Gant
- "Astoria Gloria" – Fatty Pert and Boarders
- "Railbird" – Eugene Gant
- "If I Ever Loved Him" – Laura James
- "A Dime Ain't Worth a Nickel" – Ben Gant, Fatty Pert
- "I Got a Dream to Sleep On" – Eugene Gant
- "Drifting" – Eliza Gant

Act Two

- "I Can't Believe It's You" – W.O. Gant, Madam Victoria
- "Feelin' Loved" – Eugene Gant, Laura James
- "A Medley" – Ben, Fatty, Eliza, Laura
- "Tomorrow I'm Gonna Be Old" – W.O. Gant
- "Feelin' Loved (Reprise)" – Eugene and Laura
- "How Do You Say Goodbye" – Laura
- "Gant's Waltz" – W.O. Gant and Eliza Gant
- "Like the Eagles Fly (Reprise)" – Eugene Gant

== Critical response ==
Reviewing for The New York Times, Richard Eder wrote:

- "Angel...is a damp and oppressive amalgam of bathos. It has lyrics of the consistency of cornbread soaked in milk, a whole collection of indifferent performances and a score of sufficient banality to furnish a number or two for the piped music on airplanes waiting to take off."
- "The performances have no shine to them; at best they are losing battles."
- "Mr. Geld's score is so thin and trite as to make us notice Don Walker's orchestration. Its vulgarity is unfailing."
- "It is putting things too strongly to call "Angel" a disaster. It is a desert."
