= Zygmunt Kukla (conductor) =

Polish conductor, arranger and composer

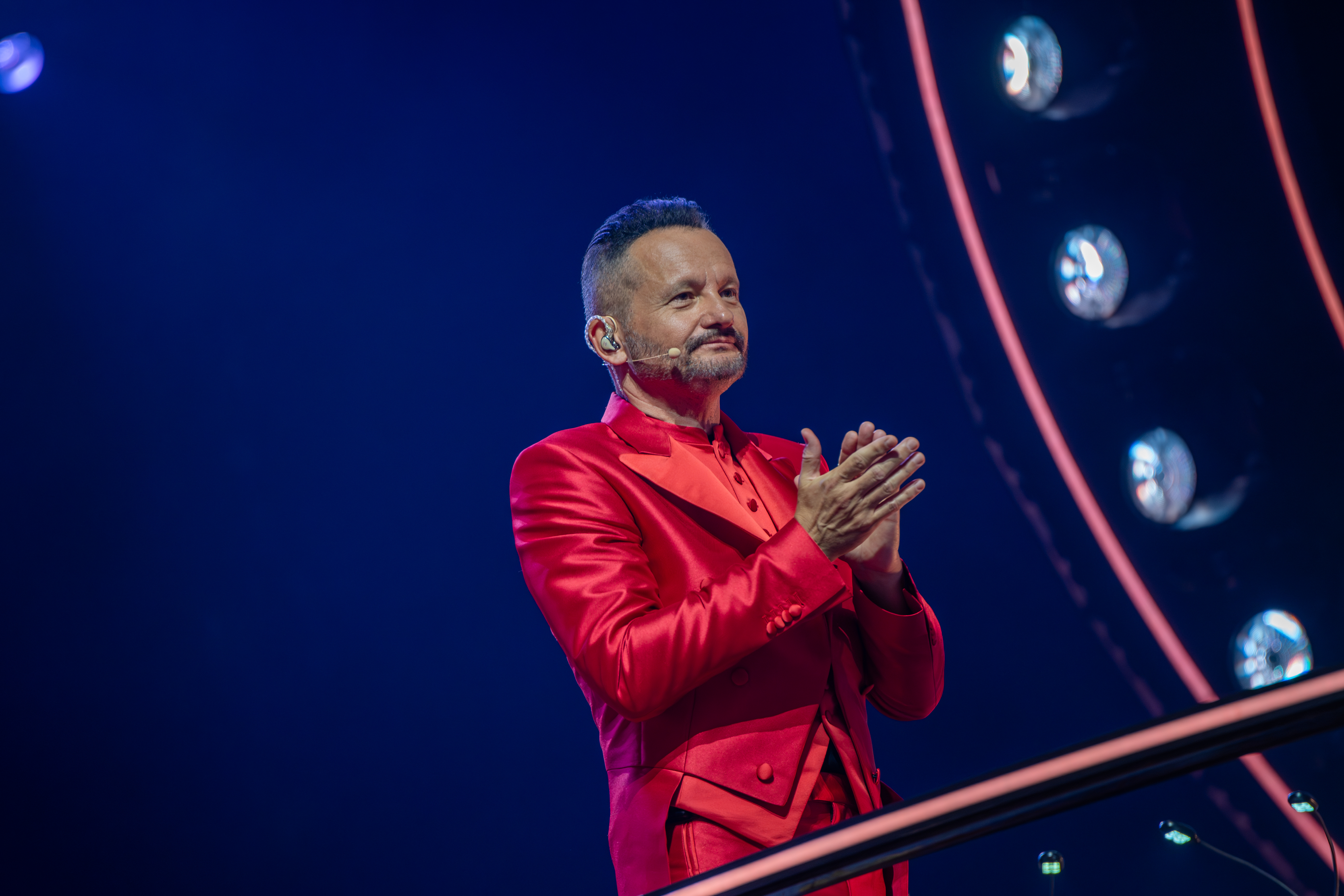
- Zygmunt Kukla, 2025

Background information
- Born: August 27, 1969 (age 56); Rzeszów, Poland
- Occupation(s): conductor, arranger, composer
- Years active: 1989–present

Zygmunt Kukla (born 27 August 1969) is a Polish conductor, arranger, and composer. He graduated from the Department of Jazz and Popular Music at the Karol Szymanowski Academy of Music in Katowice. From 1991 to 1996 he was the conductor of Janusz Józefowicz’s Metro musical. In 1989 he founded Kukla Band orchestra, with which he concerts in popular Polish TV shows, festivals and galas. Repeatedly, Kukla held the function of musical director of greatest Polish festivals (in Opole and Sopot) and in TV series Twoja twarz brzmi znajomo.

Kukla is married, and has two children. As a hobby, he works as a bus driver.
