= Zygmunt Kukla =

Zygmunt Kukla may refer to:

- Zygmunt Kukla (conductor) (born 1969), Polish conductor, arranger, and composer
- Zygmunt Kukla (footballer) (1948-2016), Polish footballer
