= Look Homeward, Angel =

1929 novel by Thomas Wolfe

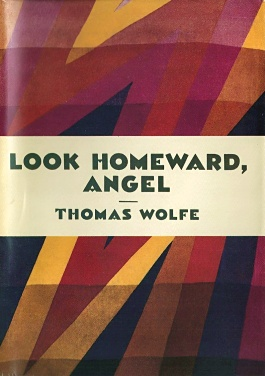
- First edition
- Author: Thomas Wolfe
- Language: English
- Genre: Bildungsroman, Southern Gothic
- Publisher: Charles Scribner's Sons
- Publication date: September, 1929
- Publication place: United States
- Media type: Print (hardcover)
- Pages: 544
- OCLC: 220422413
- Text: Look Homeward, Angel online

Look Homeward, Angel: A Story of the Buried Life is a 1929 novel by Thomas Wolfe. It is Wolfe's first novel, and is considered a highly autobiographical American coming-of-age story. The character of Eugene Gant is generally believed to be a depiction of Wolfe himself. The novel briefly recounts Eugene's father's early life, but primarily covers the span of time from Eugene's birth in 1900 to his definitive departure from home at the age of 19. The setting is a fictionalization of his home town of Asheville, North Carolina, called Altamont in the novel.

A restored version of the original manuscript of Look Homeward, Angel, titled O Lost, was published in 2000.

== Genesis and publication history ==
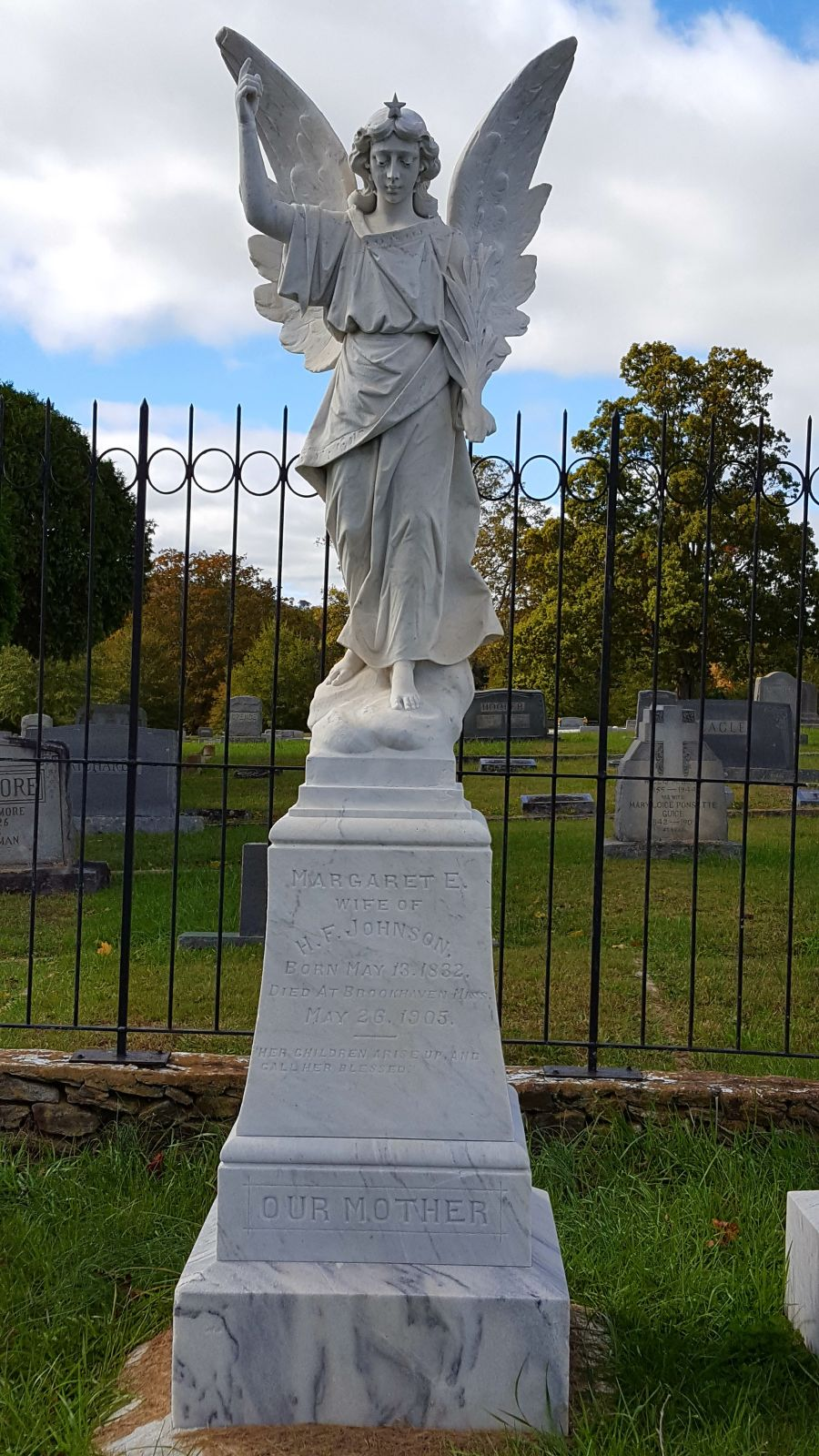
Look Homeward, Angel inspiration in the Oakdale Cemetery, Hendersonville, NC

Thomas Wolfe's father, William Oliver Wolfe, ordered an angel statue from New York and it was used for years as a porch advertisement at the family monument shop on Patton Avenue (now the site of the Jackson Building). W. O. Wolfe sold the statue to a family in Hendersonville, North Carolina in 1906. The angel was then moved to that town's Oakdale Cemetery. The boarding house run by Eugene Gant's mother, based on one run by Wolfe's mother, has been called "the most famous boardinghouse in American fiction."

The title of Thomas Wolfe's novel comes from the John Milton poem "Lycidas":

"Look homeward Angel now, and melt with ruth:
And, O ye Dolphins, waft the hapless youth."
(163–164)

Wolfe's original title was The Building of a Wall, which he later changed to O Lost. On the novel's completion, Wolfe gave the vast manuscript to Scribner editor Maxwell Perkins. Perkins was impressed with the young author's talent, but requested that Wolfe rewrite the novel to a more publishable size. The two worked through it together, and after being trimmed by 60,000 words, the novel was published in September, 1929. Wolfe became insecure about the editing process after receiving criticism that the novel was Perkins's almost as much as his own. This led to an estrangement between the two, and Wolfe eventually left Scribner. Prior to his death in 1938, Wolfe made amends with Perkins. Writing in 1947, Perkins stated that he took the book "substantially as it was," and that "in truth, the extent of cutting ... has somehow come to be greatly exaggerated. Really, it was more a matter of reorganization."

Descriptions of Altamont are based on Wolfe's home town of Asheville, North Carolina, and the descriptions of people and family led to estrangement from many in his hometown. Though often regarded as a "sentimental tale of growing up," the novel is characterized by a "dark and troubling" depiction of the times, "full of loneliness, death, insanity, alcoholism, family dysfunction, racial segregation and a profoundly cynical view of World War I." Rarely named but frequently alluded to, the infectious disease tuberculosis (consumption) casts a "death’s-head shadow" over the novel. Wolfe later died of the disease.

O Lost, the original "author's cut" of Look Homeward, Angel, was reconstructed by scholars Arlyn and Matthew Bruccoli and published in 2000 on the centennial of Wolfe's birth. Matthew Bruccoli said that while Perkins was a talented editor, Look Homeward, Angel is inferior to the complete work of O Lost and that the publication of the complete novel "marks nothing less than the restoration of a masterpiece to the literary canon."

== Plot ==
=== Part One ===
The first marriage of Oliver Gant, father of the protagonist, Eugene, ends in tragedy, after which Oliver becomes an alcoholic; the battle with alcoholism remains the major struggle of his life. He eventually remarries, builds a new house, and starts a family. The couple have a total of six surviving children.

Eugene's birth follows a difficult labor during which his father, Oliver, is drunk downstairs. Oliver forms a special bond with his son from early on. He begins to get his drinking under control, although his marriage becomes strained as Eliza's patience with him grows thinner.

Despite his flaws, Oliver Gant is the family's keystone; he reads Shakespeare, has his daughter Helen read poetry, and keeps great fires burning in the house as symbols of warmth for the family. Eugene's early education includes several clashes with teachers but he has a love of books and is bright, much to the pride of both his parents. His mother continues to baby him, unwilling to see him grow up.

=== Part Two ===
Eugene wins a writing contest and is chosen to attend Altamont Fitting School and later, the University of North Carolina.

At UNC, he is taken up by the new school principal, John Dorsey Leonard and wife, Margaret. They form a college prep academy and add Eugene to the student population at the cost of $100 per year, grudgingly provided by Eliza. He learns the basics from them both, but is prompted by Margaret to immerse himself in poetry and ancient drama. He becomes like a son to them both.

The oldest Gant son, Stevie, is a braggart and an enterprising entrepreneur, albeit with rotting, painful teeth. The younger son, Luke, minus the dental ailment, seems to be following in his footsteps, both hustlers and conmen. The kind, gentle, brooding brother, Ben, grows close to Eugene and looks out for him.

=== Part Three ===
After his freshman year, Eugene's summer back in Altamont is marked by him falling in love with a 21-year-old tenant—Laura James—at his mother's boarding house. Eugene becomes obsessed with Laura and at the end of the summer, she tells him that she is engaged to be married to a man in Norfolk, Virginia. Eugene falls into a funk which haunts him for another two years.

Oliver Gant undergoes radiation treatments for his cancer at Johns Hopkins University Hospital in Baltimore.

Eugene returns to UNC and becomes involved in academic activities including serving as the editor of the school newspaper, the literary magazine, and the poetry publication. He joins a drama writer's seminar and achieves acclaim. In the spring of 1918, his roommate unexpectedly dies of heart disease, throwing Eugene into another funk. In the summer of 1918, Eugene works at the shipyards at Norfolk, hoping to earn extra money for the upcoming school year, but this instead turns into a nightmare with him living homeless and famished for most of the summer.

After returning to UNC in the fall of 1918, he is summoned by his mother to come home immediately because his brother Ben is in a near coma with pneumonia; he dies soon after. Eugene returns to UNC and completes his studies. His mentor, English professor Vergil Weldon, encourages Eugene to apply to Harvard for graduate studies. He tells his mother of his plans; she begs him to stay at home and work for a newspaper. Eugene tells Eliza that he has a destiny elsewhere and that he cannot be boxed in by a small mountain town in North Carolina.

== Critical reception ==
Look Homeward, Angel was published in 1929 to generally positive reviews in North America, most praising the author's brilliance and emotional power. One review called it a "sensation", and described it as having struck the literary world by storm. Despite the novel's enduring popularity, Wolfe's work has since come to be viewed by many literary critics (Harold Bloom among them) as undisciplined. According to Jonathan W. Daniels, those critics wished that "Tom Wolfe's big sprawling powerful pouring prose would have been served in neater packages of sweeter stuff."

== Adaptations ==
Playwright Ketti Frings adapted the novel as a play of the same name. The play opened on Broadway at the Ethel Barrymore Theatre November 28, 1957, and ran for a total of 564 performances, closing on April 4, 1959. In 1958, Frings won the Pulitzer Prize for Drama and the New York Drama Critics' Circle Award for her adaptation of Wolfe's novel. The production received Tony Award nominations for Best Play; Best Actor in a Play (Hugh Griffith and Anthony Perkins); Best Actress in a Play (Jo Van Fleet); Best Scenic Design (Jo Mielziner); Best Costume Design (Motley); and Best Director (George Roy Hill).

Frings' screenplay was made into a TV movie, released by NBC in February 1972. The film was directed by Paul Bogart and starred Timothy Bottoms as Eugene Gant, E.G. Marshall as W.O. Gant, and Geraldine Page as Eliza. Her adaptation was re-adapted as a Broadway musical, Angel, directed by Philip Rose and choreographed by Robert Tucker. Frings co-wrote the play with the show's lyricist, Peter Udell, whose lyrics were set to music by Gary Geld. The production opened at the Minskoff Theatre on May 4, 1978, and closed May 13 after five performances and poor reviews. However, for her performance, Frances Sternhagen received a Tony Award nomination for Best Actress in a Musical and, for his performance, Joel Higgins was nominated for a Drama Desk Award for Outstanding Featured Actor in a Musical.

== In popular culture ==
In 1985, Serbian rock band Riblja Čorba released a song named "Pogledaj dom svoj, anđele" ("Look Homeward Angel" in Serbian).

In the film Cape Fear (1991), the character Danielle Bowden (Juliette Lewis) reads the book as a school assignment and then discusses it briefly with the villainous Max Cady (Robert De Niro), who is impersonating her drama teacher.

In Season 2, Episode 11 ("Unidentified Female", December 2, 1995) of the TV series Touched by an Angel, the book is part of the story of a young man who returns home after making his own coming-of-age road trip.

In the film Chinese Coffee (2000), one of the protagonists, writer Harry Levine (Al Pacino), is seen with a copy of Thomas Wolfe's Look Homeward, Angel in his hand in the cafe scenes with his photographer friend Jake Manheim (Jerry Orbach). Towards the end of the film, both characters directly mention Thomas Wolfe and quote from the book while walking on the same bridge that Thomas Wolfe used to walk on when struggling with writer's block.

The 2004 film Before Sunset alludes to the book's note "to the reader".

The film Genius (2016) is about Wolfe's life and his relationship with Maxwell Perkins from the moment Perkins received the manuscript from a colleague.

In Season 1, Episode 1 of the limited series Fellow Travelers (2023), the book is given as a gift from a devoutly religious man to his male lover, during the 1950s Lavender Scare.

In Season 2, Episode 8 of Ozark, the book is discussed in some depth by two of the teenage show characters in a book store, and one describes it as his favorite American Novel. In a later scene the book is revealed as being shoplifted from the store by the character Charlotte Byrde.

== Bibliography ==
- Wolfe, Thomas (1929). Look Homeward, Angel: A Story of the Buried Life. New York: Random House. OCLC 220422413.
- Wolfe, Thomas (2000). O Lost: A Story of the Buried Life. University of South Carolina Press. ISBN 9781570033698.
