= Thomas A. Carlin =

American actor (1928–1991)

- Born: December 10, 1928
- Died: May 6, 1991 (aged 62); New Rochelle, New York, U.S.
- Occupation: Actor
- Years active: 1956–1991
- Spouse: Frances Sternhagen
- Children: 6

Thomas A. Carlin (December 10, 1928 – May 6, 1991) was an American actor of stage, television, and film during the mid twentieth century.

== Career ==
During the 1950s and 1960s, Carlin appeared in a number of Broadway plays, including Time Limit, A Thousand Clowns and The Deputy.

In the 1960s and 1970s, Carlin taught and directed at Pace University in Pleasantville, New York and at Rye High School.

Carlin's film credits include Ragtime, Caddyshack, and The Pope of Greenwich Village.

On television, Carlin guest starred on popular series including, The Alcoa Hour, Playhouse 90, Naked City, The Doctors and the Nurses, Route 66, The Defenders, Search for Tomorrow, Another World, and The Equalizer. Carlin's last role was in 1991 on Law & Order as Sergeant Duff.

== Personal life ==
In 1956, Carlin was married to the film and television actress Frances Sternhagen and had six children; Paul, Amanda, Tony, Sarah, Peter, and John.

== Death ==
Carlin died at his home in Sutton Manor, New Rochelle, New York, on May 6, 1991, at age 62.

== Filmography ==
=== Film ===
Thomas A. Carlin film credits
Year	Title	Role	Notes
1957	The Young Don't Cry	Johnny Clancy	
1980	Caddyshack	Sandy McFiddish	
1981	Fort Apache, The Bronx	Man with Flat Tire	
1981	Ragtime	Vice President Fairbanks	
1984	The Pope of Greenwich Village	Walsh	
1987	Matewan	Turley	
1989	Family Business	Neary	
1990	Jacob's Ladder	Doorman	
1991	One Good Cop	Farrell	(final film role)

=== Television ===
Thomas A. Carlin television credits
Year	Title	Role	Notes
1956	The Alcoa Hour	Will Steinbach	1 episode
1958	True Story	John Osler	1 episode
1960	Playhouse 90	Jerry Devine	1 episode
1961	Naked City	Willard Banes / Willard Manson, Jr. / Father Meyler	2 episodes
1961–1964	The Defenders	Al Herzog / Eugene Bloch	2 episodes
1962	The Doctors and the Nurses	Dr. Carroll	1 episode
1963	Route 66	Mr. Whitney	1 episode
1966	Hawk	Doctor	1 episode
1980	The Man that Corrupted Hadleyburg		TV movie
1982	The Executioner's Song	Speaker #1	TV movie
1985	Search for Tomorrow	Father Tracey	9 episodes
1987	Another World	Sherriff	1 episode
1986	The Equalizer	Jeremy the Doorman	Episode: "Nocturne"
1988	The Equalizer	Doorman	Episode: "No Place Like Home"
1991	Law & Order	Sergeant Duff	Episode: "A Death in the Family" (final role)
