= Mr. Sycamore =

Play written by Ketti Frings

Mr. Sycamore is a play written by Ketti Frings that was published in 1942. It is about a meek mailman who becomes so obsessed with a particular sycamore tree on his delivery route that he leads himself to believe that the only way to end his troubles is to plant himself and become a tree. On Broadway, Mr. Sycamore starred Lillian Gish and Stuart Erwin.

In 1975, the play was adapted into a movie by the same name with Jason Robards, Sandy Dennis and Jean Simmons in the lead roles.
