= Janusz Józefowicz =

Polish director, choreographer, actor and dancer

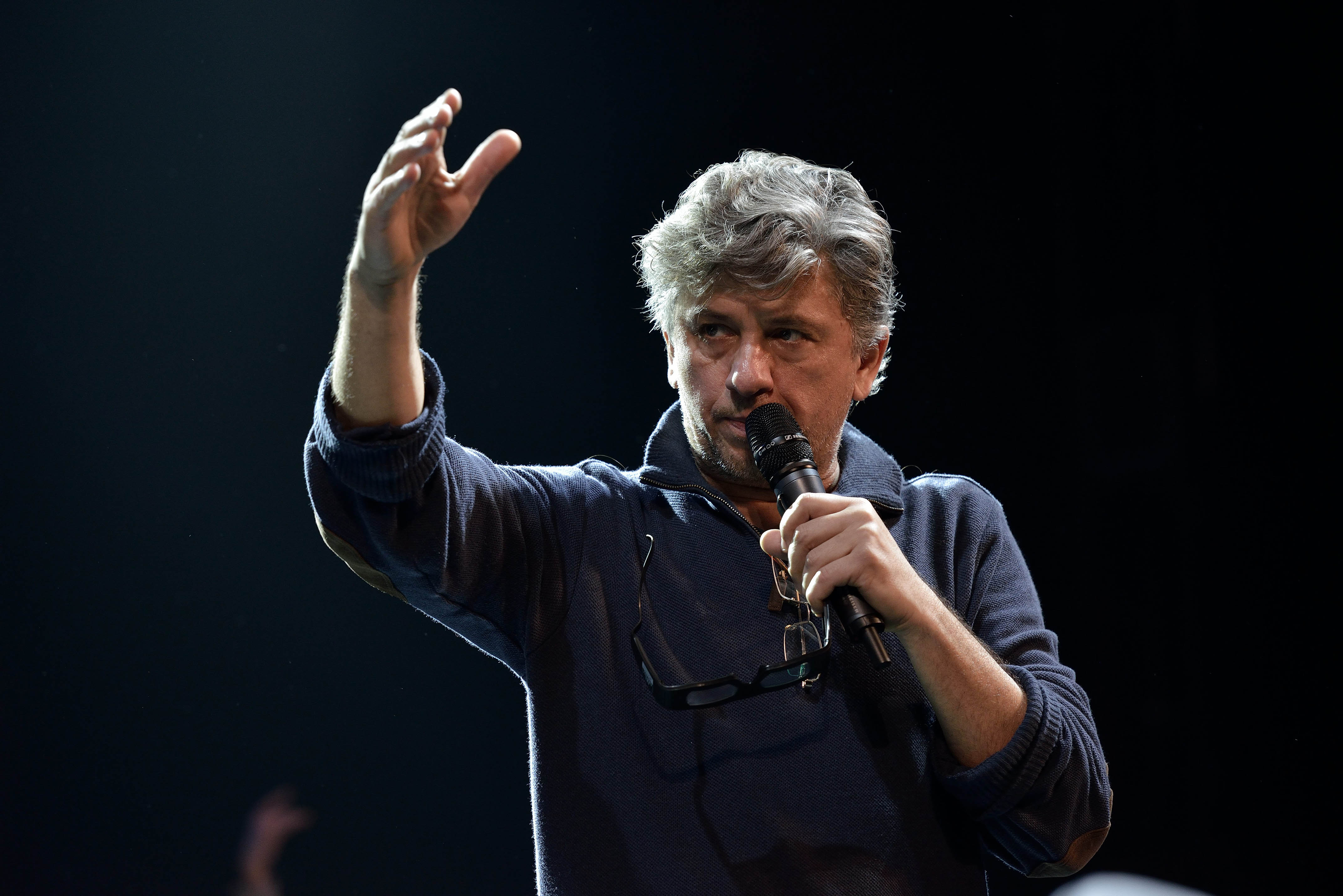
- Born: 3 July 1958 (age 68); Świecie, Poland
- Education: State Higher School of Theatre, Warsaw (Aleksander Zelwerowicz National Academy of Dramatic Art in Warsaw)
- Occupations: Director, choreographer, actor and dancer.
- Notable work: Metro
- Awards: Silver medal of Gloria Artis; Golden Mask

Janusz Józefowicz (born 3 July 1959, Świecie) is a Polish director, choreographer, actor and dancer. He is the director and choreographer of the musical Metro.

== Education ==
Józefowicz is a graduate of the State Higher School of Theatre, Warsaw (now the Aleksander Zelwerowicz National Academy of Dramatic Art). His graduate production, Misbehaving, was created in 1984. The show was performed at the Ateneum Theatre and the Teatr Rampa, where Józefowicz later became head choreographer.

Józefowicz studied dance at the Vocal and Dance School in Koszecin, and in Prague, under the dance professor Frank Towen. In 1990, Józefowicz received a six-week choreography scholarship from the United States government.

== Career ==
Józefowicz is the director and choreographer of the musical Metro. Metro had its Polish premiere on 30 January 1991 at the Dramatyczny Theatre, Warsaw, and began its Broadway run in 1992 at the Minskoff Theatre. The musical continues to be performed at the Studio Buffo Theatre, which Józefowicz became the artistic director of in 1992.

Józefowicz was the director or choreographer of several other musicals, including adaptations of Peter Pan, Romeo and Juliet, Madame Tutli-Putli, Witches of Eastwick, Prophet, Halka, Zemsta nietoperza, Krakowiacy i Górale and Dama od Maxima. In December 2011, Józefowicz directed the musical Polita, in which 3D images were used for the first time in live theatre. His most recent undertaking was directing and providing choreography to Roger Waters’ opera Ca Ira.

== Awards ==
- Golden Mask (1999/2000) – best director in all kinds of theater.
- Silver medal of Gloria Artis (2014)
- The Legend of the Musical (2014) – for laying the foundations of modern musical history in Russia
