= Metro (musical) =

- Musical music CD cover
- Music: Janusz Stokłosa
- Lyrics: Polish: Maryna Miklaszewska; Agata Miklaszewska; English: Mary Bracken Phillips
- Premiere: January 31, 1991: Warsaw's Dramatic Theatre
- Productions: 1991 Warsaw; 1992 Broadway; 1998 Moscow

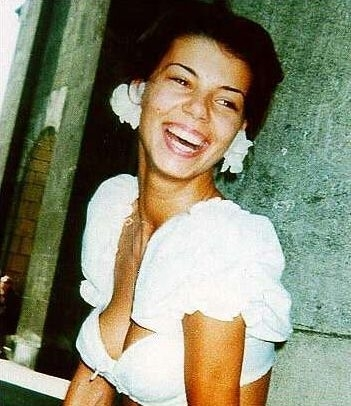
Edyta Górniak in Teatr Dramatyczny in Warsaw (1992)

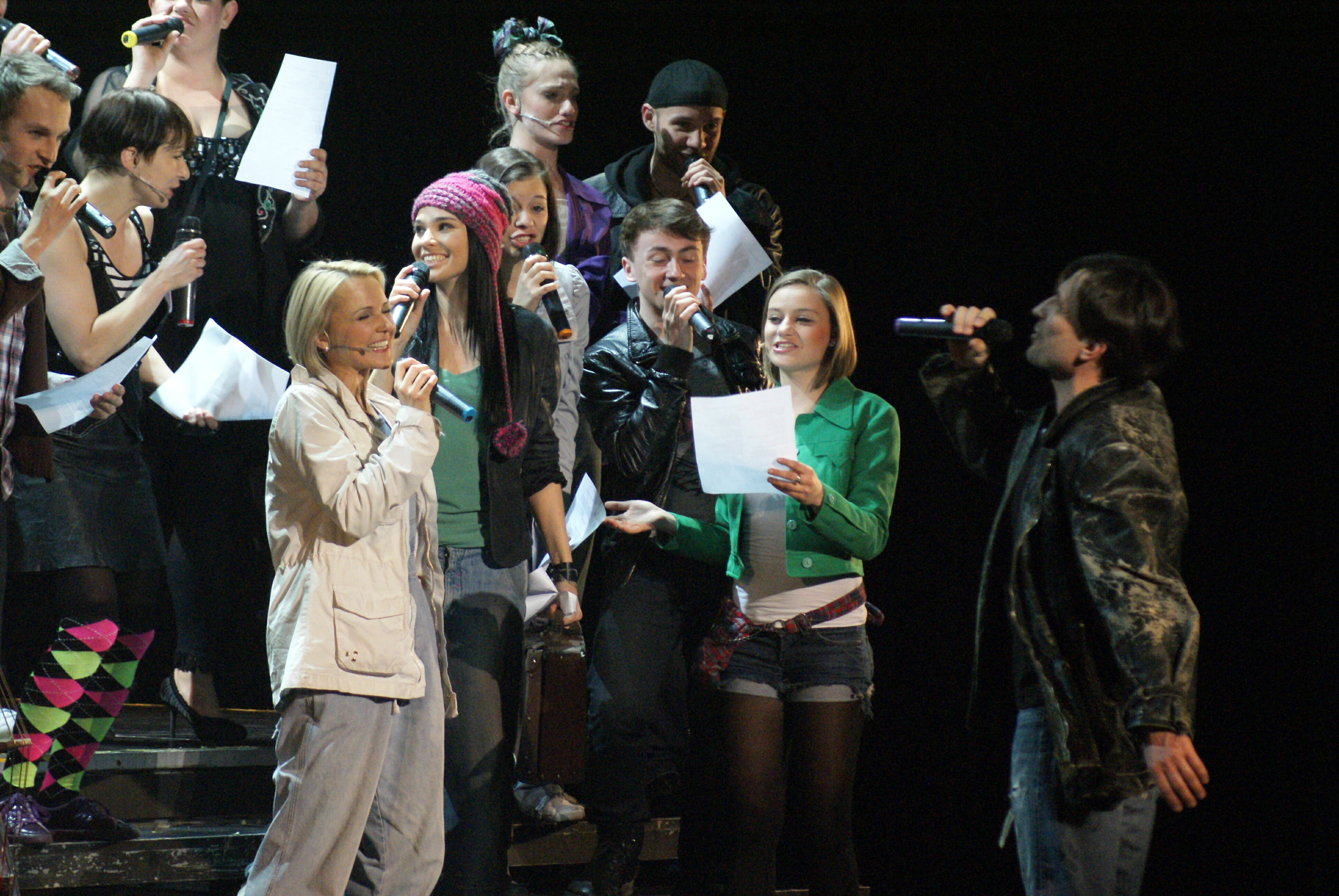
The musical is dominated by crowd scenes. In the picture, “Tower of Babel” (Wieża Babel) scene

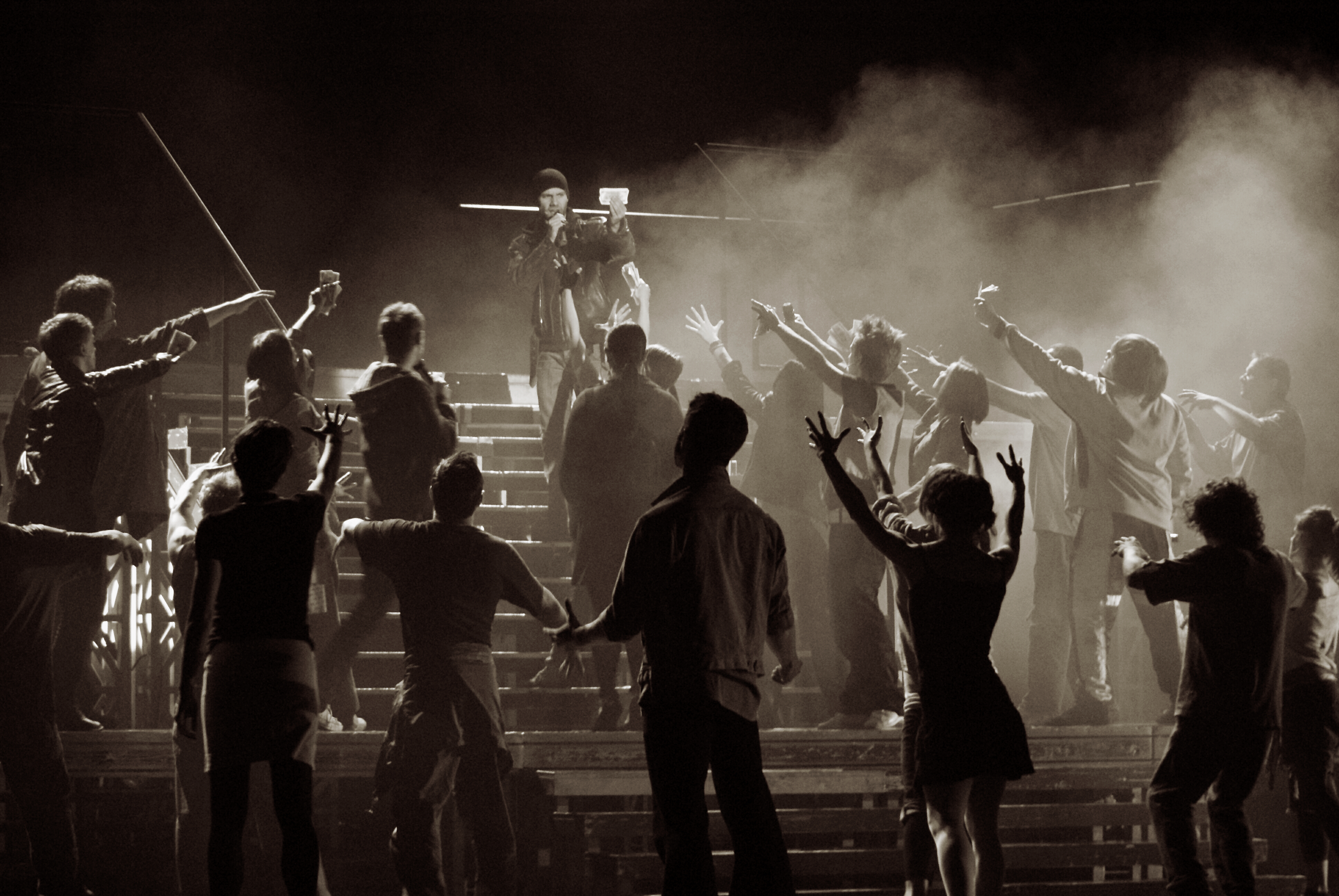
Choreography is an integral part of the musical content. In the picture, „In God we trust” scene

Metro is a Polish musical with music by Janusz Stokłosa and lyrics by Agata and Maryna Miklaszewska. Choreographed and directed by Janusz Józefowicz, the musical was funded and initially produced by Wiktor Kubiak. The play, initially staged on January 31, 1991 in Warsaw's Dramatic Theatre, turned out to be a major success in Poland and is notable for a large number of young artists who started their career in its crew. Among those who rose to fame were: Edyta Górniak, Viola Brzezińska, Katarzyna Groniec, Robert Janowski, Michał Milowicz, Grzegorz Kowalczyk and Natasza Urbańska.

In 1992 the musical opened on Broadway at the Minskoff Theatre, but soon closed due to unfavorable reviews. In 1997, the musical moved to Studio Buffo theatre in Warsaw, where it is still running in simplified arrangement after more than 2,100 performances in total. According to estimates, it was watched by approx. 2 million viewers.

== Plot ==
The storyline focuses on a group of youngsters who decided to live in the subway tunnels for various reasons. Everyone of them brings his own history and dreams. Teenagers take part in a casting to a theatre, but they do not succeed and because of that decide to organize their own musical on the subway station. After success of underground show, they get a job offer from the theater which previously rejected them. A dilemma whether to go for money or for dreams appears.

=== Scenes ===
Synopsis of scenes and musical compositions from Broadway edition.

Act 1

- Scene 1. A theatre somewhere in Europe: Philip, Jan and The Company.

“Overture” – orchestra.

- Scene 2. A Metro somewhere in Europe.

“Metro” (Metro) – Jan and The Company.

- Scene 3. The Theatre: Klaus, Denisa, Alicja, Duda, Wojtek, Jaga, Basia, Monika, Magda, Max, Philip, Anka and The Company.

“My Fairy Tale” (Chcę być kopciuszkiem) – singers: Basia, Alicja, Denisa; dancers: Iwona, Lidia, Violetta.

- Scene 4. The Metro: Jan, Anka.

“But Not Me” (A ja nie) – Jan and The Company.

- Scene 5. The Theatre: Max, Philip, Anka and The Company.

“Windows” (Szyba) – Anka; dancer: Iwona.

- Scene 6. The Metro: Jan, Anka.
- Scene 7. Audition results: Edyta, Piotr, Alicja, Denisa, Monika, Duda, Jaga, Magda, Anka.

“That's Life” (Życie) – Edyta, Anka, Polina.
“Bluezwis” (Bluzwis) – Jan, Wojtek and The Company.
“Love Duet” (Na strunach szyn) – Anka and Jan.

- Scene 8.

“Tower of Babel” (Wieża Babel) – company.

Act 2

- Scene 1.

“Labels” (Hasła) – The Company.

- Scene 2. Philip's Office: Philip, Max.
- Scene 3. Abandoned subway station: Anka, Jan, Edyta, Duda, Jaga, Klaus, Alicja, Basia, Wojtek, Duda.

“Uciekali” – Jan and The Company.

- Scene 4. The Metro: Jan, Anka, Philip.
- Scene 5. The Metro.

“Waiting” (Wszystko jedno czy słońce, czy deszcz) – Edyta, Anka and Dancers.

- Scene 6. The Metro: Anka, Jan, Max, Philip.
- Scene 7.

“Pieniedze” (Pieniądze) – The Company.

- Scene 8. The Metro: Edyta, Denisa, Jan, Wojtek, Duda, Basia, Magda, Piotr, Alicja, Grzegorz, Monika, Jaga

“Love Duet II” (Na strunach szyn II) – Anka and Jan.

- Scene 9. The Metro.

“Dreams Don't Die” (Tylko w moich snach) – Anka.

== Production history ==
Metro was first staged on January 31, 1991 in Warsaw's Dramatic Theatre. Choreographed and directed by Janusz Józefowicz, the musical was funded and initially produced by Wiktor Kubiak.

In 1997, the musical moved to Studio Buffo theatre in Warsaw, where it is still running in simplified arrangement after more than 2,100 performances in total. According to estimates, it was watched by approx. 2 million viewers.

=== Broadway ===
The musical opened on Broadway at the Minskoff Theatre on April 16, 1992, and closed on April 26, 1992, after 13 performances and 24 previews. The lyrics were translated by Mary Bracken Phillips and the director and choreographer was Janusz Józefowicz. Although it was nominated for the Tony Award for Best Original Score, it received mixed reviews and soon closed. The 1998 production in Moscow, Russia, proved to be a success and the musical is still occasionally staged both in Poland and in Russia.
