= John M. Sternhagen =

American judge (1888–1954)

John Sternhagen
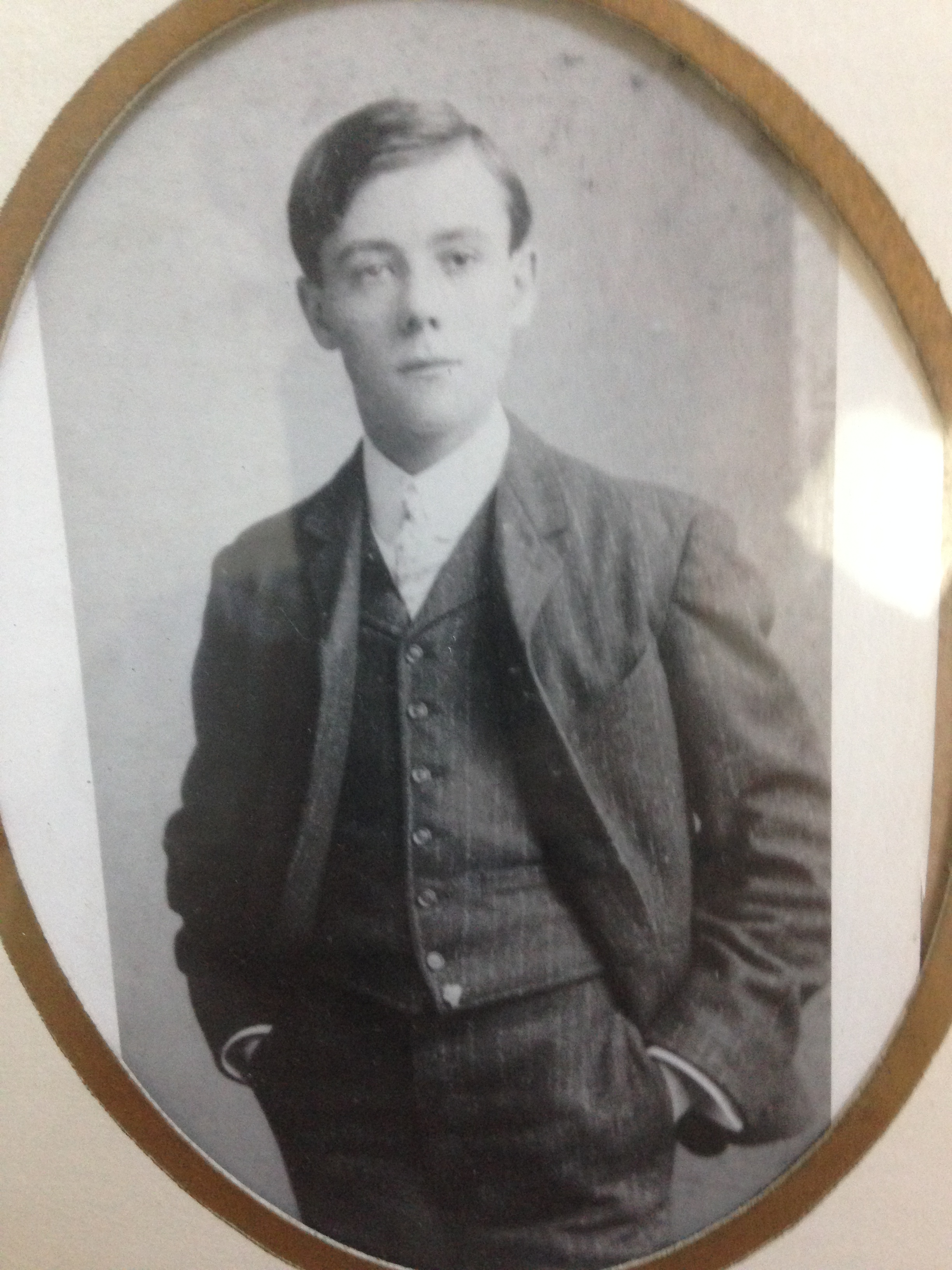
- John Sternhagen at 16
- Born: John Meier Sternhagen; March 21, 1888; Mount Vernon, New York, U.S.
- Died: September 25, 1954 (aged 66); Washington, D.C., U.S.
- Occupations: Lawyer, Board Member, Judge
- Years active: 1908–1946
- Political party: Republican
- Spouse: Gertrude Hussey (m. 1927)
- Children: Frances
- Military career
- Allegiance: United States
- Branch: Air Force
- Service years: 1918–1919
- Rank: Lieutenant
- Unit: Department of Military Aerospace
- Conflicts: World War I

John Meier Sternhagen (March 21, 1888 – September 25, 1954) was a member of the US Board of Tax Appeals and a judge of the Tax Court of the United States, from July 16, 1924, until June 1, 1946. He was the father of stage and screen actress Frances Sternhagen.

Sternhagen was born on March 21, 1888, in Mount Vernon, New York, the youngest of five children. His parents were Herman Sr. (1845–1925), a German-American immigrant, and Christina Meier Sternhagen, a native of New York. Sternhagen's siblings included Amelia (b. 1879), Louisa (b. 1882), Ella Cornelia (b. 1883) and Herman Jr. (b. 1885).

Sternhagen lived in Mount Vernon with his family for the entirety of his adolescence. In 1908, at age 20, he started working as a clerk at 229th Street, Columbus Avenue as well as on 10th and 11th Avenue. He became a secretary at 425th Street on 4th Avenue in 1914 when he was 26.

By 1918, at age 30, Sternhagen was still working as a secretary when he was drafted in World War I. He served as 2nd lieutenant of the Air Service Division stationed in Washington, D.C. He never saw combat, but served honorably from October 25, 1918, until he was honorably discharged on January 30, 1919.

Upon his return from service, Sternhagen settled in his home at 6 North Street, 15th Avenue in Mount Vernon. After four years, he returned to Chicago, where he began working as a Republican tax lawyer for hire, working at 106th South La Salle Street in 1923.

When President Coolidge, with the guidance of Treasury Secretary Andrew Mellon, passed the Revenue Act of 1924, cutting overall taxes and establishing the U.S. Board of Tax Appeals. Coolidge selected 12 initial members of the board, most of them fellow Republicans, one of them being Sternhagen. He was one of a group of seven members of the Board appointed "from the public".

Following Coolidge's appointment and Congress's confirmation, he took the oath of office with his fellow board members in the office of Under Secretary Garrard Winston on July 16, 1924.

Three years into his service, Sternhagen met and married Gertrude Hussey (1894–1977), a socialite and former war nurse during World War I. They married on April 29, 1927, in Manhattan, New York and moved to Washington, D.C., in 1928. Sternhagen sold his stock options and bought a house on "O" Street. On January 13, 1930, their only child, Frances, was born while they were in D.C. The family became involved in many different facets of local political relations, including a long-time friendship with future Secretary of State, Dean Acheson, and his family.

Sternhagen continued to serve on the Board until, in 1942, when it was converted into the Tax Court of the United States, thus making Sternhagen an official federal judge, and one of only two of the original board members to continue on to the Tax Court. It was around this time that his health began to deteriorate and his mind began to fail. He officially retired from the Tax Court on June 1, 1946.

Sternhagen died in 1954 in Washington, D.C., at the age of 66.
