= Ketti Frings =

American dramatist and screenwriter (1909–1981)

- Born: Katherine Hartley; 28 February 1909; Columbus, Ohio, U.S.
- Died: 11 February 1981 (aged 71); Los Angeles, California, U.S.
- Education: Principia College
- Spouse: Kurt Frings (1939–1958)
- Writing career
- Notable awards: Pulitzer Prize for Drama (1958)

Ketti Frings (28 February 1909 – 11 February 1981) was an American writer, playwright, and screenwriter who won a Pulitzer Prize in 1958.

== Early life and education ==
Katherine Hartley was born in Columbus, Ohio. She attended Principia College.

== Career ==
She began her career as a copywriter, and went on to work as a feature writer for United Press International.

In 1941, her novel Hold Back the Dawn was adapted for the screen. The resulting movie was directed by Mitchell Leisen and starred Olivia de Havilland and Charles Boyer. She wrote her first Broadway play, Mr. Sycamore, in 1942. The play featured Lillian Gish and Stuart Erwin in the lead roles.

Her Hollywood screenplays include Guest in the House (1944), The Accused (1949), The File on Thelma Jordon (1950), Come Back, Little Sheba (1952), About Mrs. Leslie (1954), The Shrike (1955), and Foxfire (1955).

Frings adapted the Thomas Wolfe novel Look Homeward, Angel into a play of the same name that opened on Broadway in 1957 and ran for 564 performances at the Ethel Barrymore Theatre. It received six Tony Award nominations and Frings won the annual Pulitzer Prize for Drama in 1958. She was named "Woman of the Year" by The Los Angeles Times in the same year.

== Personal life ==
Frings was married to film agent Kurt Frings from 1938 to October 31, 1958. The couple had two children, Kathie and Peter. She died of cancer in Los Angeles.

== Bibliography ==
- Hold Back the Dawn (novel), 1940
- Mr. Sycamore (play), 1942
- God's Front Porch (novel), 1944
- Look Homeward, Angel (play), 1957
- The Long Dream (play), 1960
- Walking Happy (play), 1966

== Sources ==
- Joan Cook (13 February 1981). "Ketti Frings, Stage and Film Writer". The New York Times.
- Contemporary Authors Online Gale, 2004.
