= Frances Sternhagen =

American actress (1930–2023)

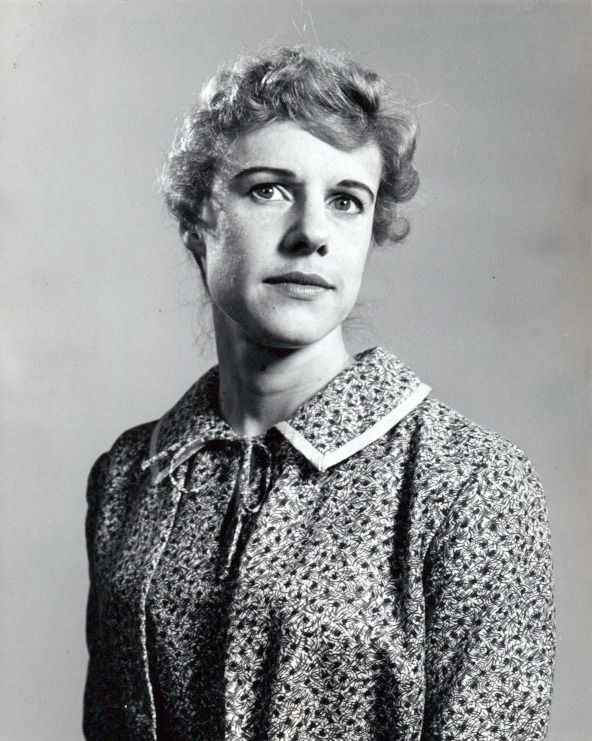
- Sternhagen in 1962
- Born: Frances Hussey Sternhagen; January 13, 1930; Washington, D.C., U.S.
- Died: November 27, 2023 (aged 93); New Rochelle, New York, U.S.
- Education: Vassar College; Catholic University of America; Neighborhood Playhouse School of the Theatre
- Occupation: Actress
- Years active: 1951–2014
- Known for: The Good Doctor; The Heiress; Outland; Equus; Cheers
- Spouse: Thomas A. Carlin (m. 1956; died 1991)
- Children: 6
- Relatives: John M. Sternhagen (father)

Frances Hussey Sternhagen (January 13, 1930 – November 27, 2023) was an American actress. She was known as a character actress who appeared on- and off-Broadway, in movies, and on television for over six decades. Sternhagen received numerous accolades, including two Tony Awards, a Drama Desk Award, and a Saturn Award, as well as nominations for three Primetime Emmy Awards.

Sternhagen gained acclaim for her extensive career on the Broadway stage. She made her debut in The Skin of Our Teeth (1955). She went on to receive two Tony Awards for Best Featured Actress in a Play for her performances as various characters in Neil Simon's comedic play The Good Doctor (1973) and as Lavinia Penniman in Ruth and Augustus Goetz's dramatic play The Heiress (1995). Her other Tony-nominated roles were for The Sign in Sidney Brustein's Window (1972), Equus (1975), Angel (1978), On Golden Pond (1979), and Morning's at Seven (2002).

She gained prominence and Primetime Emmy Award nominations for her recurring roles as Esther Clavin in the NBC sitcom Cheers (1986–1993) and Bunny MacDougal in the HBO series Sex and the City (2000–2002). She also had recurring roles in the NBC medical drama ER (1994–2009), and the TNT series The Closer (2006–2012). Sternhagen acted in numerous films, including The Hospital (1971), Starting Over (1979), Misery (1990), and Julie & Julia (2009).

== Early life and education ==
Frances Hussey Sternhagen was born in Washington, D.C., on January 13, 1930. Her father was tax court judge John M. Sternhagen and her mother was a homemaker who served as a nurse during World War I. She was educated at the Madeira and Potomac Schools in McLean, Virginia. At Vassar College, she was elected head of the Drama Club "after silencing a giggling college crowd at a campus dining hall with her interpretation of a scene from Richard II, playing none other than Richard himself". She attended the Catholic University of America as a graduate student. She also studied at the Perry Mansfield School of the Theatre, and at New York City's Neighborhood Playhouse.

== Career ==
=== 1948–1973: Early work ===
Sternhagen started her career teaching acting, singing, and dancing to school children at the Milton Academy in Massachusetts, and she first performed in 1948 at a Bryn Mawr summer theater in The Glass Menagerie and Angel Street. She went on to work at Washington's Arena Stage from 1953 to 1954, then made her Broadway debut in 1955 as Miss T. Muse in The Skin of Our Teeth. The same year, she had her off-Broadway debut in Thieves' Carnival, and her TV debut in The Great Bank Robbery on Omnibus (CBS). By the following year, she had won her first Obie Award for "Distinguished Performance (Actress)" in The Admirable Bashville (1955–56).

Sternhagen made her film debut in Up the Down Staircase (1967). Following this, she worked periodically in Hollywood. She had character roles in the Paddy Chayefsky-written The Hospital (1971), Two People (1973), and Billy Wilder's Fedora (1978). Sternhagen appeared as the daughter in the original 1971 Broadway production of Edward Albee's All Over with Colleen Dewhurst and Jessica Tandy. She worked for many years in soap operas, such as Another World, The Secret Storm, Love of Life, and The Doctors, and she played two roles on One Life to Live. She is also recognized as Mrs. Marsh from a series of television commercials for Colgate toothpaste that aired in the 1970s.

=== 1974–1993: Theater roles and Cheers ===
Sternhagen won a Tony Award for Best Featured Actress in a Play in 1974 for the original Broadway production of Neil Simon's The Good Doctor. She was also nominated for Tony Awards in that decade for her roles in Lorraine Hansberry's The Sign in Sidney Brustein's Window (1972), Equus (1975), the musical Angel (1978), which was based on Thomas Wolfe's Look Homeward, Angel, and On Golden Pond (1979). She was also nominated for the Drama Desk Award for Outstanding Actress in a Play in 1979 for On Golden Pond.

Sternhagen portrayed the title character in 1988's Pulitzer Prize-winning drama Driving Miss Daisy, which was originated by Dana Ivey at Playwrights Horizons in New York City. Sternhagen took over the role after the show moved to the John Houseman Theatre and played it for more than two years.

During this time, Sternhagen appeared as Charles Durning's strong-willed wife in Starting Over (1979) with Burt Reynolds and Jill Clayburgh, the acerbic and tough-as-nails Dr. Marian Lazarus opposite Sean Connery in Outland (1981), a turn that garnered her a Saturn Award for Best Supporting Actress, and played roles in Bright Lights, Big City (1988) and Doc Hollywood (1991), both alongside Michael J. Fox. Sternhagen's work as Sheriff Buster's (Richard Farnsworth) wife Deputy Virginia in Rob Reiner's Misery (1990), an adaptation of Stephen King's 1987 novel of the same name, and her performance as Dr. Lynn Waldheim in Brian De Palma's 1992 psychological horror-thriller Raising Cain garnered her two more career Saturn Award nominations for Best Supporting Actress. Sternhagen also played Farrah Fawcett's mother in See You in the Morning (1989). She may be best known to TV audiences as Esther Clavin, mother of John Ratzenberger's Boston postman character Cliff Clavin, on the long-running series Cheers, which she played from 1986 to 1993. For her performance, she received two Primetime Emmy Award nominations.

=== 1994–2014: Final roles ===
Sternhagen won a second Tony Award for Best Featured Actress in a Play in 1995 for the revival of The Heiress. She received her seventh and final Tony Award nomination for the 2002 revival of Paul Osborn's Morning's at Seven. Sternhagen's later television roles included Millicent Carter on ER; Bunny MacDougal, mother of Charlotte's first husband Trey, on Sex and the City (another Emmy Award nomination); a memorable Willie Rae Johnson (mother of Brenda Leigh Johnson, played by Kyra Sedgwick) on The Closer; and Law & Order, among other network dramas and sitcoms. She recorded a voice-over for a May 2002 episode of The Simpsons ("The Frying Game").

In the summer of 2005, she starred in the Broadway production of Steel Magnolias along with Marsha Mason, Delta Burke, Christine Ebersole, Lily Rabe, and Rebecca Gayheart. She also starred in the 2005 revival of Edward Albee's Seascape, produced by Lincoln Center Theater at the Booth Theater on Broadway. She received Drama Desk Award nominations in 1998 for a revival of Eugene O'Neill's Long Day's Journey into Night (which starred her own son, Paul Carlin, as her character's son, Jamie Tyrone) for the Irish Repertory Theatre and in 2005 for the World War I drama Echoes of the War. In 2013, Sternhagen was awarded the Obie Award for Lifetime Achievement. She is included in the New Rochelle Walk of Fame. Her final film roles included Irene Reppler, one of the numerous local townfolk trapped in a supermarket, in Frank Darabont's horror-chiller The Mist (2007), real-life Joy of Cooking author Irma Rombauer in Julie & Julia (2009), Clearwater Aquarium owner Gloria Forrest in Dolphin Tale (2011), and in her final screen appearance, Claire in the Rob Reiner romantic comedy And So It Goes (2014) starring Michael Douglas and Diane Keaton.

== Personal life and death ==
Sternhagen met Thomas A. Carlin while in graduate school and was married to him from 1956 until his death in 1991; the couple had four sons and two daughters.

Sternhagen was a longtime resident of New Rochelle, New York. She died at home November 27, 2023, at age 93.

== Filmography ==
=== Film ===
Year	Title	Role	Notes
1967	Up the Down Staircase	Charlotte Wolf	
1967	The Tiger Makes Out	Lady On Bus	
1971	The Hospital	Mrs. Cushing	
1973	Two People	Mrs. McCluskey	
1978	Fedora	Miss Balfour	
1979	Starting Over	Marva Potter	
1981	Outland	Dr. Marian Lazarus	
1983	Independence Day	Carla Taylor	
1983	Romantic Comedy	Blanche Dailey	
1988	Bright Lights, Big City	Clara Tillinghast	
1989	Communion	Dr. Janet Duffy	
1989	See You in the Morning	Neenie	
1990	Sibling Rivalry	Rose Turner	
1990	Misery	Deputy Virginia	
1991	Doc Hollywood	Lillian	
1991	Walking the Dog	Antique Dealer	Short film
1992	Raising Cain	Dr. Lynn Waldheim	
1998	It All Came True	Amy	
2000	Midnight Gospel	Ruth	Short film
2001	Landfall	Emily Thornton	
2001	The Rising Place	Ruth Wilder	
2002	Highway	Mrs. Murray	
2007	The Mist	Irene Reppler	
2009	Julie & Julia	Irma Rombauer	
2011	Dolphin Tale	Gloria Forrest	
2014	And So It Goes	Claire	

=== Television ===
Year	Title	Role	Notes
1956	Westinghouse Studio One	Betty	Episode: "The Arena"
1957	Westinghouse Studio One	Mary	Episode: "My Mother and How She Undid Me"
1957	Goodyear Television Playhouse	Elizabeth Barnes	Episode: "The House"
1959	Play of the Week	Eva	Episode: "Thieves Carnival"
1961	Play of the Week	Unknown	Episode: "In a Garden"
1962	The Broadway of Lerner and Loewe	Theatre-Goer	TV movie
1962	The Nurses	Mrs. Harris	Episode: "The Lady Made of Stone"
1964	The Defenders	Louise Kiley	Episode: "May Day! May Day!"
1964	Profiles in Courage	Miss Koeller	Episode: "Mary S. McDowell"
1967	NET Playhouse	Unknown	Episode: "Infancy and Childhood"
1967	Hallmark Hall of Fame	Abigail	Episode: "Soldier in Love"
1967–1968	Love of Life	Toni Prentiss Davis	TV series
1970	The Doctors	Phyllis Corrigan	TV series
1971	NET Playhouse	Unknown	Segment: "Foul!"
1971	Another World	Jane Overstreet	TV series
1972	Great Performances	Wilma Atkins	Episode: "The Rimers of Eldritch"
1974	The Secret Storm	Jessie Reddin	TV series
1974	Great Performances	Paulina	Episode: "Enemies"
1977	The Andros Targets	Mrs. Mason	Episode: "In the Event of My Death"
1978	Who'll Save Our Children?	Nellie Henderson	TV movie
1980	Mother and Daughter: The Loving War	Mrs. Lloyd	TV movie
1980	The Man That Corrupted Hadleyburg	Mary Richards	TV short
1983	Prototype	Dorothy Forrester	TV movie
1984	The Dining Room	Various	TV movie
1985	Spencer	Millie Sprague	7 episodes
1986	Resting Place	Eudora McCallister	TV movie
1986–1993	Cheers	Esther Clavin	7 episodes
1987	At Mother's Request	Berenice Bradshaw	TV movie
1987	Once Again	Esther	TV movie
1990	Follow Your Heart	Cloe Sixbury	TV movie
1991	American Experience	(voice)	Episode: "Coney Island"
1991	The Days and Nights of Molly Dodd	Dora	Episode: "Here's a High Dive Into a Shallow Pool"
1991	Golden Years	Gina Williams	7 episodes
1991	Law & Order	Margaret Langdon	Episode: "The Serpent's Tooth"
1992	She Woke Up	Noelle	TV movie
1992	Tales from the Crypt	Effie Gluckman	Episode: "None But the Lonely Heart"
1993	Labor of Love: The Arlette Schweitzer Story	Mary Rafferty	TV movie
1994	Vault of Horror I	Unknown	TV movie
1994	The Road Home	Charlotte Babineaux	6 episodes
1994	Reunion	Tobie Yates	TV movie
1995	The Outer Limits	Jean Anderson	Episode: "The Choice"
1997	Law & Order	Estelle Muller	Episode: "Legacy"
1997–2003	ER	Millicent Carter	21 episodes
1998	The Con	Hadabelle	TV movie
1998	To Live Again	Constance Holmes	TV movie
2000–2002	Sex and the City	Bunny MacDougal	10 episodes
2002	The Laramie Project	Marge Murray	TV movie
2002	The Simpsons	Mrs. Bellamy (voice)	Episode: "The Frying Game"
2004	Becker	Naomi	Episode: "Subway Story"
2006–2012	The Closer	Willie Rae Johnson	15 episodes
2012	Parenthood	Blanche Braverman	Episode: "Road Trip"

=== Theatre ===
Year	Title	Role	Notes
1955	The Skin of Our Teeth	Miss T. Muse	
1955	The Carefree Tree	Widow Yang	
1960	Viva Madison Avenue!	Dee Jones	
1962	Great Day in the Morning	Alice McAnany	
1965–1966	The Right Honourable Gentleman	Mrs. Ashton Dilke	
1967	A Doll's House	Nora Helmer	
1967–1969	You Know I Can't Hear You When the Water's Running	Harriet / Edith / Muriel (standby)	
1968–1969	The Cocktail Party	Lavinia Chamberlayne	
1969	Cock-A-Doodle Dandy	Loreleen	
1970	Blood Red Roses	Various (standby)	
1971	The Playboy of the Western World	Widow Quin	
1971	All Over	The Daughter / The Mistress (standby)	
1971	Mary Stuart	Mary Stuart / Queen Elizabeth (understudy)	
1972	The Sign in Sidney Brustein's Window	Mavis Parodus Bryson	
1972	Enemies	Paulina	
1973–1974	The Good Doctor	Performer	
1974–1977	Equus	Dora Strang	
1978	Angel	Eliza Gant	
1979–1980	On Golden Pond	Ethel Thayer	
1981	The Father	Laura	
1981–1982	Grown Ups	Helen	
1983–1984	You Can't Take It with You	Penelope Sycamore	
1985	Home Front	Maurine	
1993	A Perfect Ganesh	Margaret	
1995	The Heiress	Lavinia Penniman	
1998	Long Day's Journey into Night	Mary Cavan Tyrone	
1999	The Exact Center of the Universe	Vada Love Powell	
2002	Morning's at Seven	Ida Bolton	
2004	Echoes of the War	Mrs. Dowey	
2005	Steel Magnolias	Clairee	
2005–2006	Seascape	Nancy	
2013	The Madrid	Rose	

== Awards and nominations ==
Year	Association	Category	Project	Result	Ref.
1972	Tony Award	Best Featured Actress in a Play	The Sign in Sidney Brustein's Window	Nominated	
1973	Tony Award	Best Featured Actress in a Play	The Good Doctor	Won	
1974	Drama Desk Award	Outstanding Featured Actress in a Play	Equus	Won	
1974	Tony Award	Best Featured Actress in a Play	Equus	Nominated	
1978	Tony Award	Best Actress in a Musical	Angel	Nominated	
1979	Drama Desk Award	Outstanding Actress in a Play	On Golden Pond	Nominated	
1979	Tony Award	Best Actress in a Play	On Golden Pond	Nominated	
1981	Saturn Award	Best Supporting Actress	Outland	Won	
1990	Saturn Award	Best Supporting Actress	Misery	Nominated	
1991	Primetime Emmy Award	Outstanding Guest Actress in a Comedy Series	Cheers	Nominated	
1992	Primetime Emmy Award	Outstanding Supporting Actress in a Comedy Series	Cheers	Nominated	
1992	Saturn Award	Best Supporting Actress	Raising Cain	Nominated	
1995	Tony Award	Best Featured Actress in a Play	The Heiress	Won	
1998	Drama Desk Award	Outstanding Actress in a Play	Long Day's Journey into Night	Nominated	
2002	Tony Award	Best Featured Actress in a Play	Morning's at Seven	Nominated	
2002	Primetime Emmy Award	Outstanding Guest Actress in a Comedy Series	Sex and the City	Nominated	
2003	Satellite Award	Best Supporting Actress - Television	The Laramie Project	Nominated	
2004	Drama Desk Award	Outstanding Actress in a Play	Echoes of the War	Nominated	
