= Minskoff Theatre =

Broadway theater in Manhattan, New York

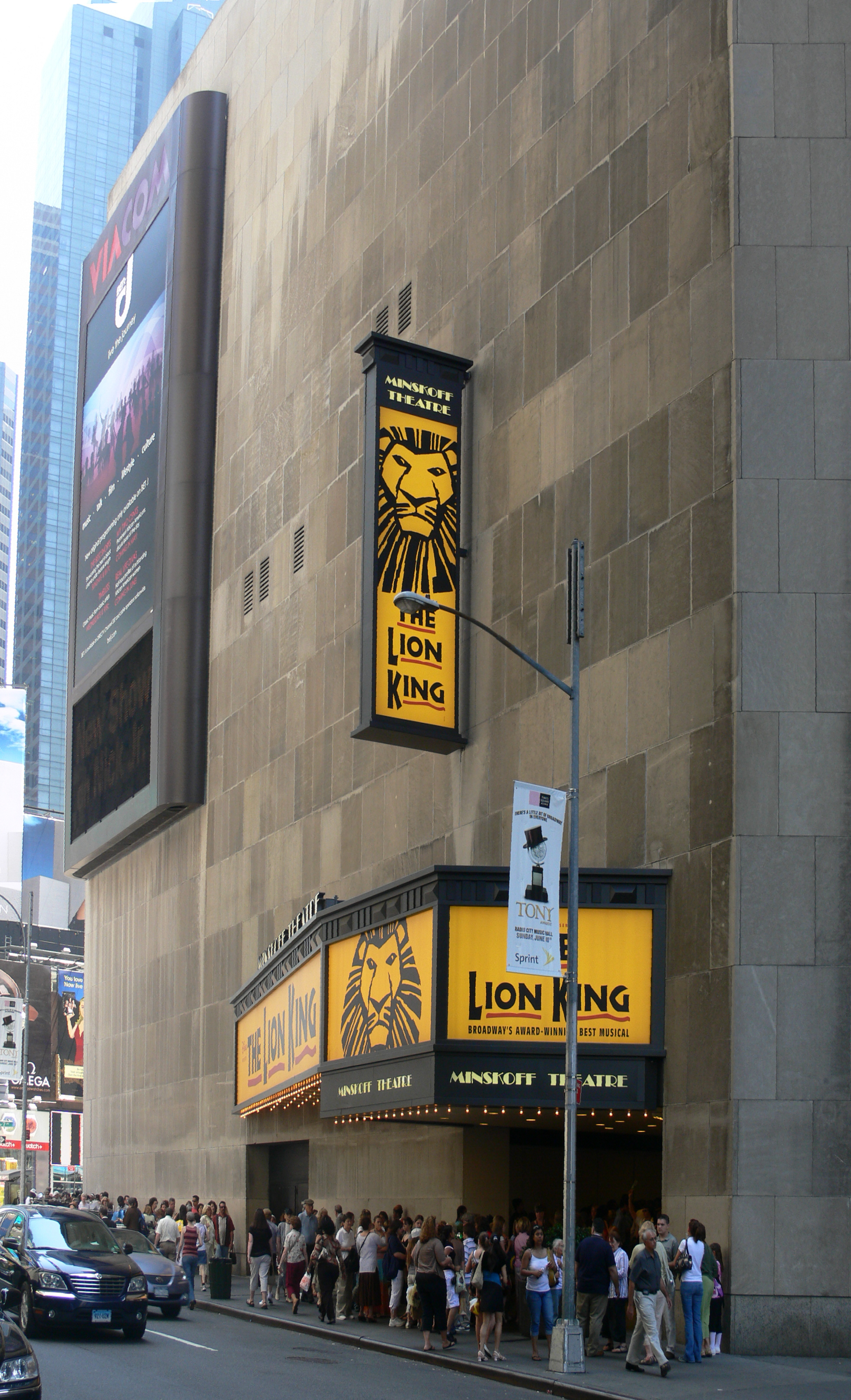
- Minskoff Theatre, showing The Lion King, May 2007
- Interactive map of Minskoff Theatre
- Address: 1515 Broadway; Manhattan, New York; United States
- Coordinates: 40°45′29″N 73°59′10″W
- Owner: SL Green Realty (majority)
- Operator: Nederlander Organization
- Capacity: 1,710 (Note: This capacity is approximate and may vary depending on the show.)
- Type: Broadway
- Production: The Lion King

Construction
- Opened: March 13, 1973 (53 years ago)
- Architect: Kahn and Jacobs

Website
- broadwaydirect.com/venue/minskoff-theatre/

The Minskoff Theatre is a Broadway theater on the third floor of the One Astor Plaza office building in the Theater District of Midtown Manhattan in New York City, New York, U.S. Opened in 1973, it is operated by the Nederlander Organization and is named after Sam Minskoff and Sons, the building's developers. There are approximately 1,710 seats in the auditorium, spread across an orchestra level and a balcony. Over the years it has hosted musicals, dance companies, and concerts.

The Minskoff was designed by Kahn and Jacobs, who designed One Astor Plaza. It was one of the first theaters constructed under the Special Theater District amendment of 1967. The theater's main entrances are from a passageway connecting 44th and 45th Streets, in the middle of a city block between Broadway to the east and Eighth Avenue to the west. There are escalators leading from the ground floor to the lobby, where further escalators lead to the auditorium. One Astor Plaza's eastern section is directly above the theater and has to be supported entirely by the theater's roof.

One Astor Plaza was initially proposed in 1967 without any theaters. The Minskoff Theatre was added during the planning process; in exchange, One Astor Plaza's developers were allowed to erect a taller building with additional floor area. The first major production at the Minskoff, Irene, was followed by a series of short-lived productions in the 1970s. The theater subsequently hosted long runs such as West Side Story, The Pirates of Penzance, Black and Blue, and Sunset Boulevard in the 1980s and 1990s. Though many of the Minskoff's early productions were unprofitable, since 2006 it has housed the musical The Lion King, which became the highest-grossing Broadway musical ever in 2014.

== Design ==
The Minskoff Theatre is on the third floor of One Astor Plaza, also known as 1515 Broadway, along Times Square in the Midtown Manhattan neighborhood of New York City, New York, U.S. Der Scutt designed the Minskoff, with Ben Schlanger as a consulting architect. Jo Mielziner was the consultant for the theater's original operator, Albert Selden. The Minskoff, Gershwin, Circle in the Square, and American Place theaters were all constructed under the Special Theater District amendment of 1967 as a way to give their respective developers additional floor area.

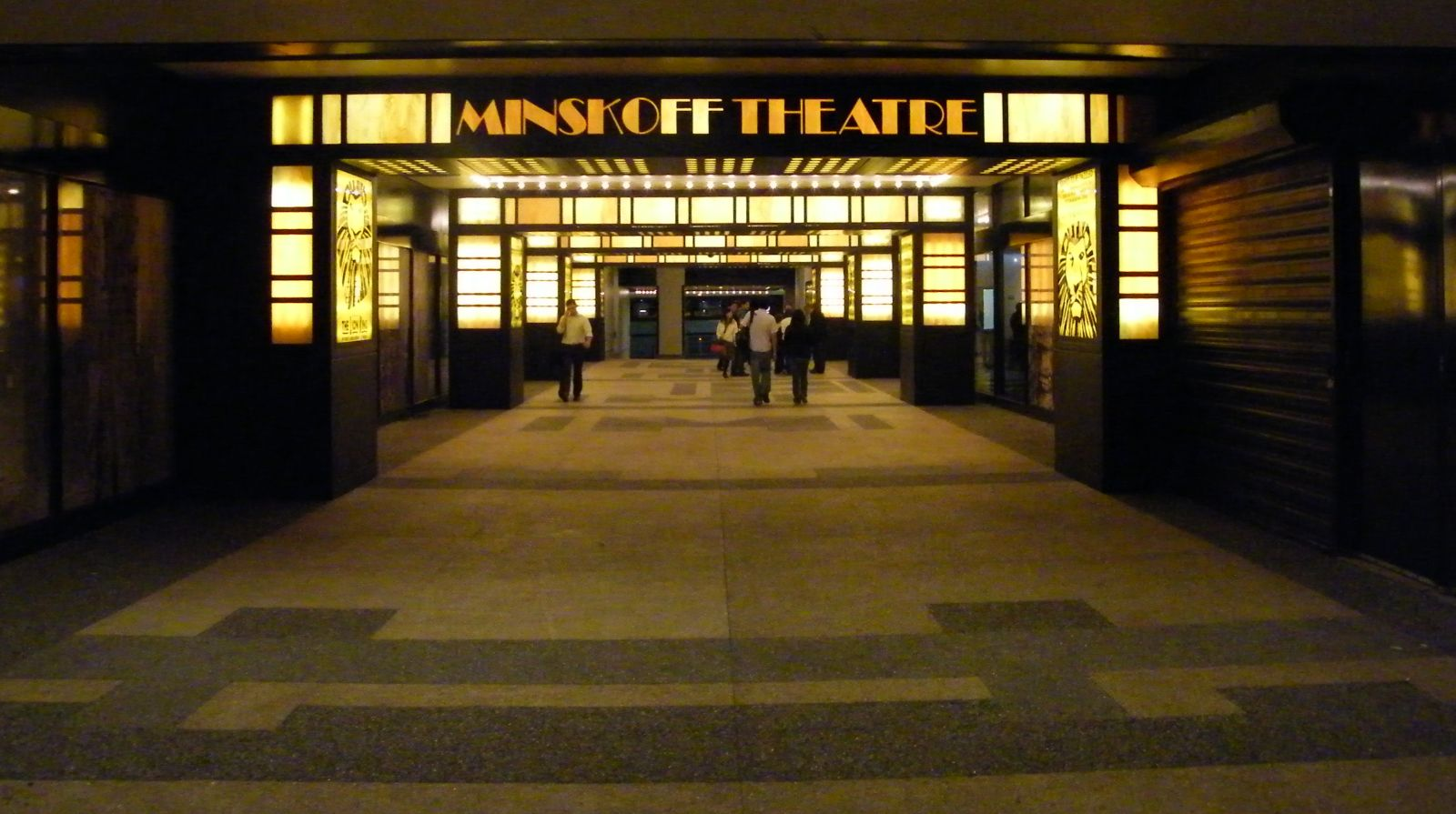
Minskoff entrance

The theater is accessed from a covered arcade under the center of One Astor Plaza, which connects 44th and 45th Streets. The escalators from the arcade lead to the third-floor grand foyer, which has a glass wall overlooking Times Square. Additional escalators lead from here to the seating areas. The grand foyer has bars and coat checks. The glass-walled lobby has also been used for weddings but, according to a 1977 feature in the New York Daily News, weddings were not allowed during performances of shows.

=== Auditorium ===
The Minskoff Theatre has approximately 1,710 seats across two levels: a steeply raked orchestra level at the third story and a smaller mezzanine above. When the theater opened in 1973, approximately 1,000 seats were placed on the orchestra level, while 640 were placed on the mezzanine. Unlike other Broadway houses, the theater used a continental seating layout, with no middle aisle. Consequently, rows can have up to 52 seats between egresses. The Minskoff was the first fully wheelchair-accessible Broadway theater in New York City.

The ceiling of the auditorium contains crystal-basket light fixtures and is divided in two sections by a lighting grid. The mezzanine level has narrow protrusions on the side walls instead of box seats. The proscenium arch is designed with mesh panels that can be removed. The stage contains traps at several locations, and the fly system above the stage is placed on the upstage wall, rather than on the sides. Unlike older theaters in New York City, the Minskoff and Gershwin theaters were subject to less stringent building codes. For example, the Minskoff was designed without fire curtains, since the city had allowed sprinkler systems to be installed in both theaters.

=== Structural features ===
One Astor Plaza's eastern section is directly above the theater and has to be supported entirely by the theater's roof. The steel was provided by Bethlehem Steel; its supervising engineer Thomas Connolly said One Astor Plaza's superstructure "would have been a snap from an engineering point of view", but the theater's presence made "a humdinger of an engineering feat". The theater roof consists of a Vierendeel truss that rests on two girders, one weighing 89 short tons (79 long tons; 81 t) and the other weighing 109 short tons (97 long tons; 99 t). These girders were the heaviest in any building at the time, and they had to be delivered in several pieces from the factory, itself an intricate operation. According to Mielziner, the large trusses above the Minskoff's roof provided "a clear example of what expense a builder is willing to go to get that extra rentable space".

== History ==
=== Construction ===
Sam Minskoff & Sons had hired Kahn and Jacobs to design One Astor Plaza in 1967, having acquired the site the previous year. At the time, city officials were encouraging the westward expansion of office towers in Manhattan. There were few efforts to preserve existing Broadway theaters, since theatrical experts believed the existing theaters (all built before World War II) were functionally obsolete. Consequently, the plans for One Astor Plaza initially did not include a theater. The Minskoffs had applied for zoning amendments for their new tower, and a member of the New York City Planning Commission (CPC) notified the Urban Design Group (UDG) about the application. This brought the attention of New York City mayor John Lindsay, a fan of Broadway theater. The UDG proposed that One Astor Plaza include a theater, a suggestion that the Minskoffs initially opposed. However, the Minskoffs ultimately relented after appealing to CPC chairman Donald H. Elliott, then to mayor Lindsay.

In October 1967, the CPC proposed the Special Theater District Zoning Amendment, which gave zoning bonuses to office-building developers who included theaters. The proposed legislation would directly allow theaters in One Astor Plaza and the Uris Building, which would be the first completely new Broadway theaters since the Mark Hellinger Theatre was completed in 1930. (Note: The Hellinger was initially a movie theater and did not become a Broadway venue until 1949. The Lunt-Fontanne Theatre and Palace Theatre were converted from movies to Broadway theaters afterward, but both theater buildings are physically older than the Hellinger. The last venue to be built as a Broadway theater, operating continuously in that capacity, was the Ethel Barrymore Theatre, completed in 1928.) The CPC approved the theater amendment that November, and the New York City Board of Estimate gave final approval to the proposal the next month. As planning progressed, members of the Broadway-theatre industry expressed concerns that theatrical experts had not been consulted in the design of One Astor Plaza's theater. In March 1968, the CPC scheduled a public hearing to determine whether the Astor and Uris theater permits should be approved, including a second theater in the Uris Building. Six parties testified in favor; the Shubert Organization, the largest operator of Broadway theaters, was the only dissenting speaker. The CPC approved the theater over the Shuberts' objections, as did the Board of Estimate. Albert W. Selden had tentatively agreed to lease the Broadway theater in One Astor Plaza.

Mayor Lindsay attended the groundbreaking ceremony for One Astor Plaza on October 10, 1968. The inclusion of the Broadway theater, and the complex engineering involved in the project, delayed the building's construction. Although Minskoff & Sons president Jerome Minskoff had agreed to the theater as "our way of paying the city back", he said this had increased costs by up to 30 percent, from $55 to $70 million. Furthermore, Selden insisted that a modern technical system be installed in the new theater, which would add $400,000 to the cost. By 1971, though the theater was almost complete, it was still not officially named. The next August, the theater's first production was announced: a revival of the comedy Irene. The developers informed Broadway producers that any production in the theater would need $21,000 a week to break even.

=== 1970s ===
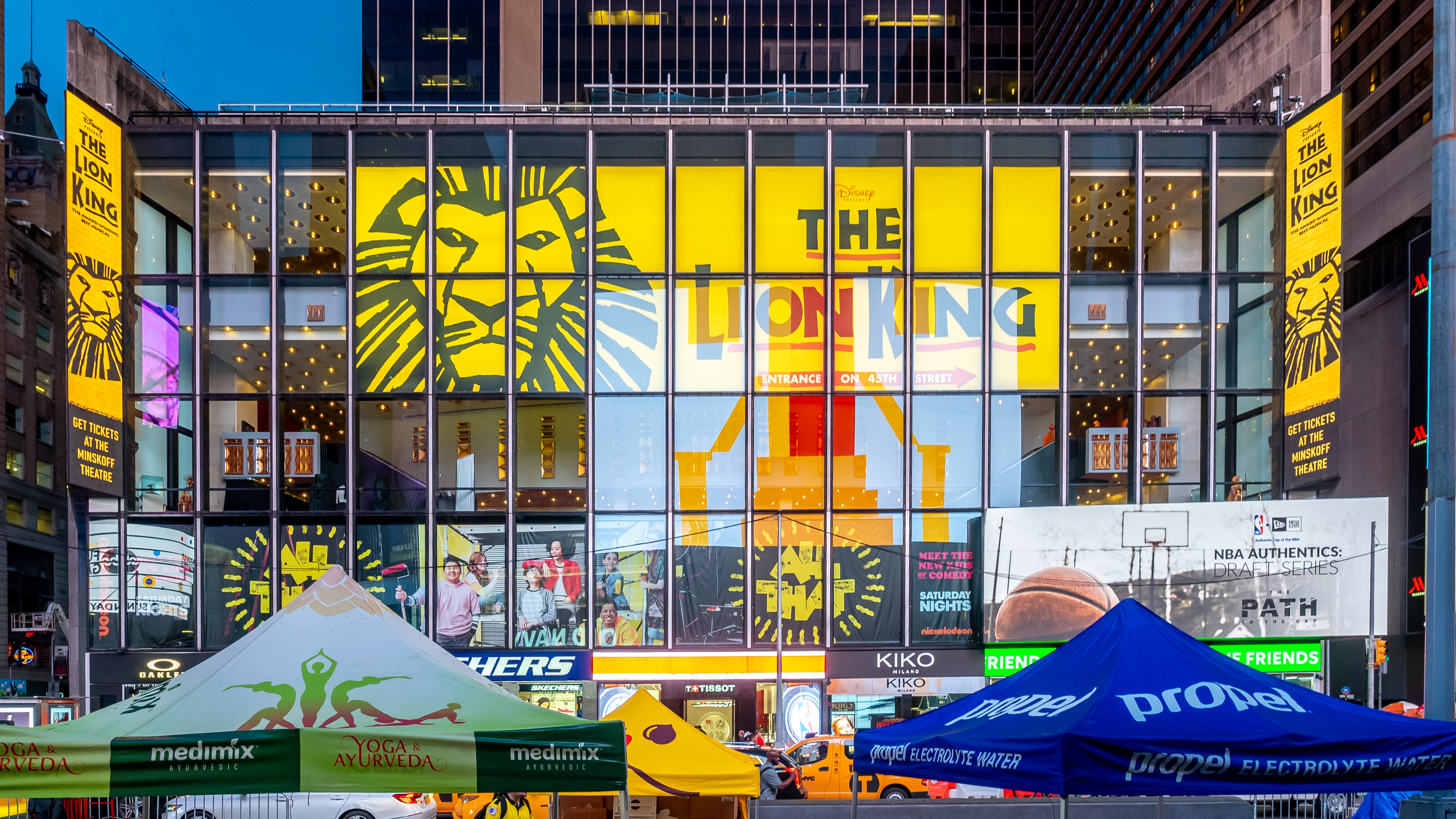
The facade of the theater from Times Square, at the base of One Astor Plaza

Theatrical historian Ken Bloom described most of the Minskoff's earliest productions as "a series of concerts, ballets, and flop musicals". The theater hosted several previews of Irene in early 1973 prior to the venue's official opening. The Minskoff officially opened with that musical on March 13, 1973. Within five months, several dancers reported being injured when they fell on the stage, and Actors' Equity threatened to prohibit its dancers from performing there, prompting the theater's operators to make improvements to the stage. Irene lost money despite its popularity with audiences, and it ultimately closed in September 1974 with 605 performances. It was followed by two concerts in late 1974: Charles Aznavour in a solo concert, as well as Tony Bennett and Lena Horne performing together.

Henry Fonda's solo show Clarence Darrow arrived in March 1975, followed by Bette Midler's Clams on the Half Shell Revue that April and Pearl Bailey and Billy Daniels's production of Hello, Dolly! in November. The Minskoff hosted the rock musical Rockabye Hamlet, which flopped with seven performances in February 1976. The Dutch National Ballet made its United States debut at the Minskoff in November 1976, and the Chinese Acrobats of Taiwan performed the same month. The Merce Cunningham Dance Company had a brief engagement in January 1977, and the Minskoff hosted the final performances of the long-running musical Pippin, which transferred from the Imperial, later that year. Further live appearances included Cleo Laine's concert Cleo on Broadway in October 1977; the laser-light show Star Wars Concert Live in December 1977; and the Murray Louis Dance Company with Rudolf Nureyev in April 1978.

Two short-lived musicals appeared at the Minskoff in 1978: Peter Udell and Gary Geld's Angel, with five performances, and Jacob Brackman and Peter Link's King of Hearts, with 48 performances. That December, the theater hosted a short run of the ice-skating show Ice Dancing. Béjart Ballet performed at the Minskoff for three weeks in March 1979, and the musical Got Tu Go Disco ran for eight performances that June. The Minskoff staged further live performances in late 1979, including appearances from Shirley Bassey in September, Engelbert in November, and the Chinese Acrobats & Magicians of Taiwan in December. At the time, because no hits had opened at the Minskoff Theatre after Irene closed, the Minskoff family was negotiating to have the Nederlander Organization take over the theater. Ultimately, in November 1979, Jerome Minskoff and James M. Nederlander agreed to jointly operate the theater.

=== 1980s and 1990s ===
In 1980, the Minskoff hosted a revival of the musical West Side Story, which lasted for 333 performances. The next year, Irene Saez of Venezuela was crowned the winner of the Miss Universe 1981 pageant at the Minskoff, and David Merrick's musical 42nd Street was performed at the theater on CBS's Miss Universe telecast. A revival of the musical Can-Can lasted five performances in April 1981, and Joseph Papp's production of The Pirates of Penzance relocated from the Uris to the Minskoff that August, running for a year and three months. Alan Jay Lerner's musical Dance a Little Closer closed on opening night in May 1983, and the musical Marilyn: An American Fable fared little better, running for 16 performances that November. When One Astor Plaza was sold in 1984 to Tishman Speyer and the Equitable Life Assurance Society, Jerome Minskoff and James Nederlander negotiated a long-term lease for the theater.

The musical The Tap Dance Kid relocated from the Broadhurst to the Minskoff in March 1984, closing the next year after 669 total performances. Subsequently, the Minskoff hosted three live appearances in early 1986: the singer Patti LaBelle, the folk group Peter, Paul and Mary, and the vocal groups The Temptations and The Four Tops. The musical Sweet Charity opened in April 1986 and subsequently had 368 performances. During the run of Sweet Charity, the Minskoff hosted its first Tony Awards, the 1986 edition. The musical Teddy & Alice lasted for 77 performances after opening in late 1987, and the long-running Cabaret transferred from the Imperial early the next year. The Minskoff then hosted the 1988 Tony Awards immediately after Cabaret ended that June. The Minskoff's last show of the 1980s was the musical Black and Blue, which opened in January 1989 and had 829 performances over two years.

The Minskoff once again hosted the Tony Awards in 1991, followed that November by a limited run of the musical Peter Pan. The Polish musical Metro flopped in April 1992 with 24 performances, and the theater was largely empty until February 1993, when it was used for a taping of a Great Performances episode about Black and Blue. A revival of Andrew Lloyd Webber's musical Joseph and the Amazing Technicolor Dreamcoat came to the theater in November 1993, running for six months. Another musical by Lloyd Webber, Sunset Boulevard, opened at the Minskoff in November 1994. During the run of Sunset Boulevard, the 49th Tony Awards were hosted at the Minskoff in 1995. Sunset Boulevard ran for two years, closing in March 1997 with 977 performances. The musical The Scarlet Pimpernel then opened at the Minskoff in November 1997. After receiving negative criticism, the producers revised the musical over eight days in October 1998; the modified musical ran through May 1999. This was followed in October by Saturday Night Fever, which ran through December 2000.

=== 2000s to present ===
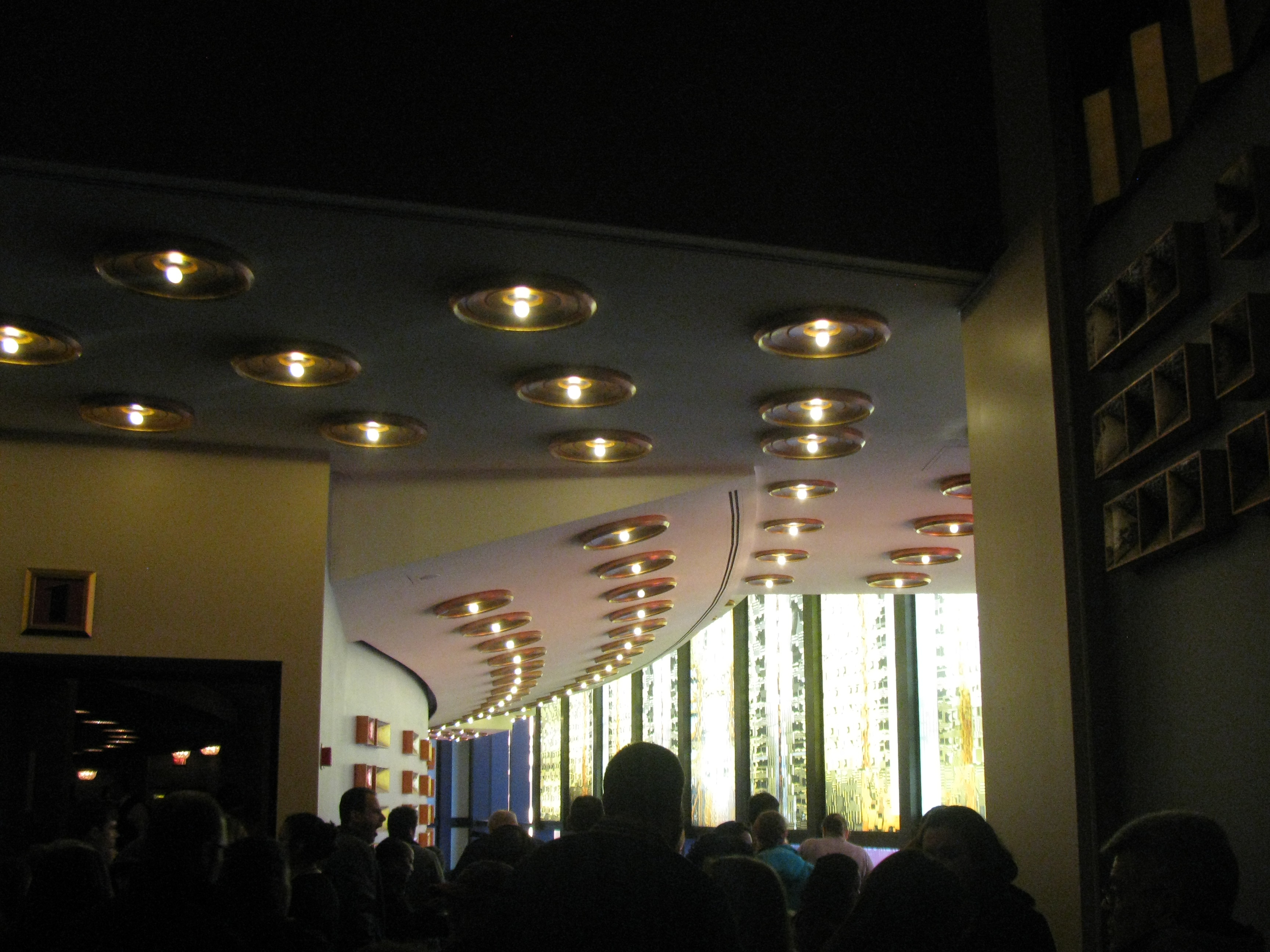
Lobby view

The Minskoff's first production of the 21st century was The Adventures of Tom Sawyer, which opened in April 2001 and failed after 21 performances. The empty theater was used for a tribute to the late composer Lee Strasberg in February 2002. The Minskoff did not have another production until December 2002, when the musical Dance of the Vampires opened. The show lost its entire $12 million investment, making it one of the most expensive flops in Broadway history, and closed after 56 performances. The Minskoff again stood empty until February 2004, when the musical Fiddler on the Roof was revived; it ran for 781 performances. By then, some figures in the theatrical industry had begun to believe that the Minskoff was an unlucky theater, as it had rarely hosted a profitable show. Several of the longer-lasting shows, such as Irene and Sunset Boulevard, had closed at a loss.

In November 2005, the long-running musical The Lion King was booked for the Minskoff, having been forced to relocate after eight years at Disney's New Amsterdam Theatre. The theater was then renovated to accommodate The Lion King, which changed theaters in June 2006. The Lion King has run continuously at the Minskoff since its relocation. A new set within the Minskoff Theatre was created in 2007 for the syndicated news magazine The Insider, which broadcast there for a year. In addition, starting in 2011, the Minskoff has hosted the Jimmy Awards for high school students every June. The Lion King became Broadway's highest-grossing musical ever in 2014, and it became the third-longest-running Broadway production in 2015 after overtaking the previous record-holder, Cats. (Note: After The Phantom of the Opera at the Majestic Theatre, which ran from 1988 to 2023, and Chicago at the Ambassador Theatre, which has run since 1997 (and at the Ambassador since 2003).)

As part of a settlement with the United States Department of Justice in 2014, the Nederlanders agreed to improve disabled access at their nine Broadway theaters, including the Minskoff. Subsequently, the Nederlanders added restroom stalls in 2017; the renovation took place when The Lion King was running. The Lion King achieved the box office record for a show at the Minskoff Theatre, grossing $3,696,977 over twelve performances for the week ending January 2, 2019. The theater closed on March 12, 2020, due to the COVID-19 pandemic. It reopened on September 14, 2021, with performances of The Lion King. The pandemic had also forced the cancellation of two Jimmy Awards ceremonies at the theater: the 2020 edition, which was scrapped entirely, and the 2021 edition, which was hosted online.

== Notable productions ==
Productions are listed by the year of their first performance.

Notable productions at the theater
Opening year	Name	Refs.
1973	Irene	
1974	Charles Aznavour on Broadway	
1974	Tony & Lena Sing	
1975	Bette Midler's Clams on the Half Shell Revue	
1975	Hello, Dolly!	
1976	Rockabye Hamlet	
1976	Debbie	
1976	Dutch National Ballet	
1977	Merce Cunningham Dance Company	
1977	Pippin	
1977	Cleo on Broadway	
1978	Dutch National Ballet	
1978	Angel	
1978	King of Hearts	
1979	Béjart: Ballet of the Twentieth Century	
1979	Shirley Bassey on Broadway	
1979	Engelbert on Broadway	
1980	West Side Story	
1981	Miss Universe 1981	
1981	Can-Can	
1981	The Pirates of Penzance	
1983	Dance a Little Closer	
1983	Marilyn: An American Fable	
1984	The Tap Dance Kid	
1986	Patti LaBelle	
1986	Peter, Paul & Mary "From Bleecker to Broadway"	
1986	The Temptations and The Four Tops	
1986	Sweet Charity	
1987	Teddy & Alice	
1988	Cabaret	
1989	Black and Blue	
1991	Peter Pan	
1992	Metro	
1993	Joseph and the Amazing Technicolor Dreamcoat	
1994	Sunset Boulevard	
1997	The Scarlet Pimpernel	
1999	Saturday Night Fever	
2001	The Adventures of Tom Sawyer	
2002	Dance of the Vampires	
2004	Fiddler on the Roof	
2006	The Lion King	

== See also ==
- List of Broadway theaters

Preceded by Sejong Cultural Center (South Korea) Seoul	Miss Universe venue 1981	Succeeded by Coliseo Amauta (Peru) Lima
