= AUDELCO =

African American theatre awards

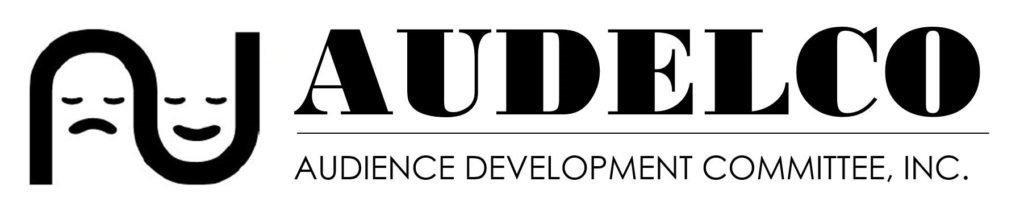

AUDELCO, the Audience Development Committee, Inc., was established in 1973 by Vivian Robinson to honor excellence in African American theatre in New York City.

AUDELCO presents the Vivian Robinson/AUDELCO Recognition Awards (also known as Viv awards) annually. The awards were created to promote "recognition, understanding, and awareness of the arts in the African-American community."

The AUDELCO awards recognize the following Off-Broadway and Off-Off Broadway:

- Productions by African-American companies
- Productions written and/or directed by African-Americans
- African-American actors in productions

== Description ==
AUDELCO has an office in Harlem, and the current president is Jacqueline Jeffries. The board of directors includes: Tony Peterson (2nd Vice-President), Ralph Carter (3rd Vice-President), Linda Armstrong (secretary), and Cherine Anderson, A. Curtis Farrow, Bambi Jones, Donna M. Mills, Mary Seymour, Dale Ricardo Shields, Terrence Spivey, and Mary B. Davis as the Chair Emeritus. The organization has thousands of members, a newsletter, and an African-American theater collection including books, photographs, slides, and scripts, as well as an extensive clippings on file of African-American theatre.

== History ==
A year after its founding, the Awards were designated to more specific roles in the design and production of shows such as scenic, lighting, and costume design, choreography, acting, and directing. In 1975, the Awards moved to focus on accomplishments made in particular productions. Three years later, in 1978, the rules to be nominated for an AUDELCO Award became more concrete.

The AUDELCO awards recognize productions by professional, not-for-profit theater organizations that have existed for at least two years and have had a minimum of 500 hours of rehearsal, performance, and/or training. Productions have to be performed over 12 times within the year (September 1 through August 31). Workshop productions and works-in-progress are not eligible for the awards.

These guidelines are still followed today and those nominated for Awards are chosen by a committee. In order to qualify to be a committee member, one must see an average of 100 shows in a year. Once the committee is selected, only five nominations can be considered for each category of the Awards.

AUDELCO typically hosts the award ceremony annually; however in 1996, there were no individual awards presented due to the founder Vivian Robinson passing away just a few months prior that September.

== Select awards ==
Previous AUDELCO awardees include: Marsha Stephanie Blake, Chadwick Boseman, Viola Davis, George Faison, André Holland, Sanaa Lathan, Barbara Montgomery, Anika Noni Rose, André De Shields, Denzel Washington, and many others.

AUDELCO Recognition Awards (1974)
| Name | Category | Year |
|---|---|---|
| Shirley Prendergast | Lighting Design | 1974 |
| Joseph Gandy | Scenic Design | 1974 |
| Judy Dearing Parks | Costume Design | 1974 |
| Helaine Head | Stage Management | 1974 |
| Aduke Aremu | Producing | 1974 |
| Milo Timmons | Choreography | 1974 |
| Howard Roberts | Musical Direction | 1974 |
| Shauneille Perry | Directing | 1974 |
| Richard Wesley | Playwrighting | 1974 |
| Barbara Montgomery | Acting | 1974 |
| Dick Anthony Williams | Acting | 1974 |

AUDELCO Recognition Awards (1975-1981, '83, '85, '87-'89, '95-'04, '06, '09-Present)
| Name | Category | Production | Year |
|---|---|---|---|
| Sandra Ross | Lighting Design | Waiting for Mongo | 1975 |
| Joseph Gandy | Scenic Design | Cotillion | 1975 |
| Judy Dearing Parks | Costume Design | Black Picture Show, Taking of Miss Janie, and Cotillion | 1975 |
| Woodie King, Jr. | Producing | Cotillion | 1975 |
| Rod Rodgers | Producer | Prodigal Sister | 1975 |
| Bill Gunn | Playwright | Black Picture Show | 1975 |
| Robbie McCauley | Supporting Actress | Taking of Miss Janie | 1975 |
| Kirk Kirksey | Supporting Actor | Taking of Miss Janie | 1975 |
| Zaida Coles | Lead Actress | Cotillion | 1975 |
| Dick Anthony Williams | Lead Actor | Black Picture Show | 1975 |
| Sandra Ross | Lighting Design | Eden | 1976 |
| Joseph Gandy | Scenic Design | Fat Tuesday | 1976 |
| Woodie King, Jr. | Producer | for colored girls... | 1976 |
| Joseph Papp | Producer | for colored girls... | 1976 |
| Bolani | Costume Design | Soljourney into Truth | 1976 |
| Regge Life | Director | Hail, Hail the Gangs | 1976 |
| Deborah Allen | Choreography | Mondongo | 1976 |
| Ntozake Shange | Playwright | for colored girls... | 1976 |
| Barbara Montgomery | Supporting Actress | Eden | 1976 |
| Lou Meyers | Supporting Actor | Fat Tuesday | 1976 |
| Trazana Beverly | Lead Actress | for colored girls... | 1976 |
| Graham Brown | Lead Actor | Eden | 1976 |
| Shirley Prendergast | Lighting Design | Unfinished Women... | 1977 |
| Tim Phillips | Scenic Design | Winti Train | 1977 |
| Edna Watson | Costume Design | Macbeth | 1977 |
| Bill Duke | Director | Unfinished Women... | 1977 |
| Talley Beatty | Choreography | Alice | 1977 |
| Richard Wesley | Playwright | The Last Street Play | 1977 |
| Rosanna Carter | Supporting Actress | Unfinished Women... | 1977 |
| Leonard Jackson | Supporting Actor | Macbeth | 1977 |
| Brenda Brown | Lead Musical Actress | Young, Gifted, & Broke | 1977 |
| Mikell Pinkney | Lead Musical Actor | Young, Gifted, & Broke | 1977 |
| Gloria Foster | Lead Actress | Agamemnon | 1977 |
| Richard Gant | Lead Actor | Soledad Tetrad | 1977 |
| Sandra Ross | Lighting Design | The Amen Corner | 1978 |
| Ronald Walker | Scenic Design | The River Niger | 1978 |
| Karen Perry | Costume Design | Birdland | 1978 |
| Richard Gant | Play Director | The Island | 1978 |
| Glenda Dickerson | Musical Director | Magic & Lions | 1978 |
| Otis A. Salid | Choreography | High John de Conquer | 1978 |
| Ivey McCray | Playwright | Run'ners | 1978 |
| Pamela Poitier | Supporting Actress | Run'ners | 1978 |
| Flo Wiley | Supporting Actress | Sandra Lane | 1978 |
| Charles Brown | Supporting Actor | Cockfight | 1978 |
| Suavae Mitchell | Supporting Actor | The River Niger | 1978 |
| Celestine DeSaussure | Lead Musical Actress | High John de Conquer | 1978 |
| Reginald VelJohnson | Lead Musical Actor | Birdland | 1978 |
| Marc Primus | Musical Creator | High John de Conquer | 1978 |
| Frances Foster | Lead Actress | Do Lord Remember Me | 1978 |
| Helmar Augustus Cooper | Lead Actor | The River Niger | 1978 |
| Tim Phillips | Lighting Design | Inacent Black and the Five Brothers | 1979 |
| Felix E. Cochren | Scenic Design | Inacent Black and the Five Brothers | 1979 |
| Felix E. Cochren | Costume Design | The Vampire and the Dentist | 1979 |
| Mikell Pinkney | Play Director | Inacent Black and the Five Brothers | 1979 |
| Mical Whitaker | Musical Director | Simply Heavenly | 1979 |
| Dianne McIntyre | Choreography | spell #7 | 1979 |
| A. Marcus Hemphill | Playwright | Inacent Black and the Five Brothers | 1979 |
| Mary Alice | Supporting Actress | Second Thoughts | 1979 |
| Robert Christian | Supporting Actor | Coriolanus | 1979 |
| Noble Lee Lester | Lead Musical Actor | Simply Heavenly | 1979 |
| Grenoldo Frazier | Musical Creator | Them Niggars Went Thataway | 1979 |
| Warren Burdine | Musical Creator | Them Niggars Went Thataway | 1979 |
| Starletta DuPois | Lead Actress | Mary Goldstein and the Author | 1979 |
| Barbara Montgomery | Lead Actress | Nevis Mountain Dew | 1979 |
| Glynn Turman | Lead Actor | Raisin in the Sun | 1979 |
| Marvin Watkins | Lighting Design | On Midnight, Friday the 13th | 1980 |
| Roger Furman | Scenic Design | On Midnight, Friday the 13th | 1980 |
| Bernard Johnson | Costume Design | The More You Get The More You Want | 1980 |
| Dean Irby | Play Director | Home | 1980 |
| Ron Stacker Thompson | Musical Director | Dunbar | 1980 |
| Otis A. Salid | Choreography | The More You Get The More You Want | 1980 |
| Samm-Art Williams | Playwright | Home | 1980 |
| Brenda Denmark | Supporting Actress | Miss Ann Don't Cry No More | 1980 |
| Adolph Caesar | Supporting Actor | La Grima Del Diablo | 1980 |
| Dyane Harvey | Lead Musical Actress | Dunbar | 1980 |
| Jeffery V. Thompson | Lead Musical Actor | The More You Get The More You Want | 1980 |
| Ayanna | Musical Creator | Dunbar | 1980 |
| Ron Stacker Thompson | Musical Creator | Dunbar | 1980 |
| Quitman Fludd III | Musical Creator | Dunbar | 1980 |
| Lonnie Hewitt | Musical Creator | Dunbar | 1980 |
| Paul E. Smith | Musical Creator | Dunbar | 1980 |
| Gloria Foster | Lead Actress | Mother Courage and Her Children | 1980 |
| Clarence Williams III | Lead Actor | Suspenders | 1980 |
| Melody Beal | Lighting Design | Rashomon | 1981 |
| Robert Edmonds | Scenic Design | When the Chickens Come Home to Roost | 1981 |
| Judy Dearing | Costume Design | Steal Away | 1981 |
| Allie Woods | Play Director | When the Chickens Come Home to Roost | 1981 |
| Charles Turner | Musical Director | Bessie Smith, Empress of the Blues | 1981 |
| Charles Moore | Choreography | Black Nativity | 1981 |
| Charles Fuller | Playwright | Zooman and the Sign | 1981 |
| Laurence Holder | Playwright | When the Chickens Come Home to Roost | 1981 |
| Carol Mitchell-Smith | Supporting Actress | One Monkey Don't Stop No Show | 1981 |
| Herb Downer | Supporting Actor | The Trial of Dr. Beck | 1981 |
| Ebony Jo-Ann | Lead Musical Actress | Bessie Smith, Empress of the Blues | 1981 |
| Paul Carter Harrison | Musical Creator | Tabernacle | 1981 |
| Thom Foster | Musical Creator | Tabernacle | 1981 |
| Ernie McClintock | Musical Creator | Tabernacle | 1981 |
| Phylicia Ayers-Allen | Lead Actress | Zora | 1981 |
| Denzel Washington | Lead Actor | When the Chickens Come Home to Roost | 1981 |
| Lee Chamberlin | Lead Actress | Hospice | 1983 |
| Timothy Simonson | Lead Actor | The Trial of Adam Clayton Powell Jr. | 1983 |
| Ruth Brown | Lead Musical Actress | Champeen | 1983 |
| Sandra Reaves-Phillips | Lead Musical Actress | Champeen | 1983 |
| Melvin Van Peebles | Musical Creator | Champeen | 1983 |
| Melvin Van Peebles | Musical Director | Champeen | 1983 |
| Bruce Hawkins | Lead Musical Actor | Champeen | 1983 |
| Louis Johnson | Choreography | Champeen | 1983 |
| Pearl Cleage | Playwright | Hospice | 1983 |
| Frances Foster | Play Director | Hospice | 1983 |
| Bette Howard | Play Director | Parting | 1983 |
| Llewellyn Harrison | Scenic Design | Hospice | 1983 |
| Zebedee Collins | Lighting Design | Jesse and the Games | 1983 |
| Tim Phillips | Lighting Design | The Trials and Tribulations of Staggerlee Brown | 1983 |
| Garland Lee Thompson Jr. | Sound Design | Jesse and the Games | 1983 |
| Felix E. Cochren | Costume Design | The Trials and Tribulations of Staggerlee Brown | 1983 |
| P.J. Gibson | Playwright | Long Time Since Yesterday | 1985 |
| Bette Howard | Play Director | Long Time Since Yesterday | 1985 |
| Sheryle R. Jones | Choreography | Flat Street Sa'day Nite | 1985 |
| Lenga Tooks | Musical Creator | Flat Street Sa'day Nite | 1985 |
| Patricia A. Clement | Lead Musical Actress | Flat Street Sa'day Nite | 1985 |
| Steve Beckham | Lead Musical Actor | Flat Street Sa'day Nite | 1985 |
| Antonio Fargas | Lead Actor | Toussaint: Angel-Warrior in Haiti | 1985 |
| Anthony F. Chase | Supporting Actor | Toussaint: Angel-Warrior in Haiti | 1985 |
| Ira L. Jeffries | Playwright | Odessa | 1985 |
| Cherron Hoye | Lead Actress | Odessa | 1985 |
| Betty Vaughn | Supporting Actress | Odessa | 1985 |
| Shauneille Perry | Musical Director | Celebration | 1985 |
| Cheryl Hilliard-Hewitt | Lead Musical Actress | The Legacy | 1987 |
| Tunde Samuel | Lead Musical Actor | The Legacy | 1987 |
| David D. Wright | Musical Director | The Legacy | 1987 |
| Essene R | Lead Actress | Black Medea | 1987 |
| Mari Nobles Da Silva | Choreography | Black Medea | 1987 |
| Bonnie Devlin | Musical Creator | Black Medea | 1987 |
| A. Dean Irby | Musical Director | Boogie Woogie and Booker T | 1987 |
| LaTanya Richardson | Supporting Actress | Boogie Woogie and Booker T | 1987 |
| Judy Dearing | Costume Design | Boogie Woogie and Booker T | 1987 |
| Charles McClennahan | Scenic Design | Boogie Woogie and Booker T | 1987 |
| George C. Wolfe | Playwright | The Colored Museum | 1987 |
| Dick Anthony Williams | Lead Actor | The Meeting | 1987 |
| Lee Chamberlain | Musical Creator | Struttin' | 1988 |
| Lee Chamberlain | Musical Director | Struttin' | 1988 |
| Jillian C. Hamilton | Lead Musical Actress | Struttin' | 1988 |
| Roumel Reaux | Lead Musical Actor | Struttin' | 1988 |
| Clarice Laverne Thompson | Musical Director | Crescent Tales | 1988 |
| Elmo Terry Morgan | Play Director | The Fruits of Miss Morning | 1988 |
| Donald Lee Taylor | Lead Actor | Boogie Woogie and Booker T | 1988 |
| Brenda Denmark | Lead Actress | From the Mississippi Delta | 1988 |
| LaTanya Richardson | Lead Actress | From the Mississippi Delta | 1988 |
| Marsha Z. West | Supporting Actress | The Fruits of Miss Morning | 1988 |
| Maurice Carlton | Supporting Actor | Reunion in Bartersville | 1988 |
| M. Neema Barnette | Play Director | The Talented Tenth | 1989 |
| Richard Wesley | Playwright | The Talented Tenth | 1989 |
| Marie Thomas | Lead Actress | The Talented Tenth | 1989 |
| LaTanya Richardson | Supporting Actress | The Talented Tenth | 1989 |
| Elmo Terry Morgan | Musical Creator | Song of Sheba | 1989 |
| Clarice Laverne Thompson | Musical Creator | Song of Sheba | 1989 |
| Clarice Laverne Thompson | Musical Director | Song of Sheba | 1989 |
| Elmo Terry Morgan | Musical Director | Song of Sheba | 1989 |
| Anthony Cooper | Lead Musical Actor | Song of Sheba | 1989 |
| Johanna Daughtery | Musical Performance | Song of Sheba | 1989 |
| Judith Samuel | Choreography | Song of Sheba | 1989 |
| Melody Beal | Lighting Design | Song of Sheba | 1989 |
| Akili Prince | Lead Actor | The Forbidden City | 1989 |
| Frankie Faison | Supporting Actor | The Forbidden City | 1989 |
| Loren Sherman | Scenic Design | The Forbidden City | 1989 |
| Judy Dearing | Costume Design | The Forbidden City | 1989 |
| Janice Jenkins | Solo Performance | In Pursuit of Justice | 1995 |
| Bruce Edwin Jenkins | Play Director | In Pursuit of Justice | 1995 |
| George C. Wolfe | Play Director | Blade to the Heat | 1995 |
| Ntozake Shange | Ensemble Director | for colored girls... | 1995 |
| Herman Lavern Jones | Musical Director | Shoehorn! | 1995 |
| Marjorie Johnson | Lead Actress | M The Mandela Saga | 1995 |
| Paul Calderon | Lead Actor | Blade to the Heat | 1995 |
| Mickey Davidson | Choreography | for colored girls... | 1995 |
| Laurence Holder | Playwright | M The Mandela Saga | 1995 |
| Johnnie Mae | Supporting Actress | Why Old Ladies Cry at Weddings | 1995 |
| Chuck Patterson | Supporting Actor | Blade to the Heat | 1995 |
| Idris Ackamoor | Lead Musical Actor | Shoehorn! | 1995 |
| Craig Harris | Musical Creator | for colored girls | 1995 |
| Paul Gallo | Lighting Design | Blade to the Heat | 1995 |
| Riccardo Hernandez | Scenic Design | Blade to the Heat | 1995 |
| Ka-Ran Bridges | Costume Design | In Pursuit of Justice | 1995 |
| Geno Brantley | Sound Design | In Pursuit of Justice | 1995 |
| Dan Moses Schreier | Sound Design | Blade to the Heat | 1995 |
| Roger Guenveur Smith | Solo Performance | A Huey P. Newton Story | 1997 |
| Woodie King Jr. | Musical Director | A Trip to Nowhere | 1997 |
| Fulton Hodges | Musical Director | A Trip to Nowhere | 1997 |
| Janice Jenkins | Lead Actress | Bolt for the Blue | 1998 |
| Gregor Manns | Lead Actor | Our Husband Has Gone Mad Again | 1998 |
| Michael Broughton | Solo Performance | Jim Beckworth | 1998 |
| Jimmy Miller | Musical Director | Satan Never Sleeps | 1998 |
| Jerome Shavers | Lead Musical Actor | Satan Never Sleeps | 1998 |
| Adrianne Lenox | Lead Musical Actress | Dinah Was | 1998 |
| Sandra Reaves-Phillips | Lead Musical Actress | Rollin' on the T.O.B.A. | 1998 |
| Kimberly Purneli | Supporting Actress | Glady's Dilemma | 1998 |
| Fulton Hedges | Supporting Actor | Our Husband Has Gone Mad Again | 1998 |
| Lillie Marie Redwood | Playwright | Imperfection Flawed | 1998 |
| George Faison | Choreography | Dinah Was | 1998 |
| Ronald Wyche | Musical Director | Satan Never Sleeps | 1998 |
| Wynn Handman | Ensemble Director | Fly | 1998 |
| Gertrude Jeannette | Play Director | Bolt from the Blue | 1998 |
| David Wright | Sound Design | Fly | 1998 |
| Marcel Christian | Costume Design | Julius Caesar Set in Africa | 1998 |
| Steve Walker | Scenic Design | Bolt from the Blue | 1998 |
| Christophe Pierre | Lighting Design | Nzinga's Children | 1998 |
| Leslie Uggams | Lead Actress | The Old Settler | 1999 |
| Adam Wade | Lead Actor | Still Such a Thing as Love | 1999 |
| Vinie Burrows | Solo Performance | Rose McClendon: Harlem's Gift to Broadway | 1999 |
| Viola Davis | Supporting Actress | Everybody's Ruby | 1999 |
| Godfrey L. Simmons | Supporting Actor | The Old Settler | 1999 |
| Marcia L. Leslie | Playwright | The Trial of One Short-Sighted Black Woman vs. Mammy Louise and Safreeta Mae | 1999 |
| Paul Carter Harrison | Play Director | The Trial of One Short-Sighted Black Woman vs. Mammy Louise and Safreeta Mae | 1999 |
| Nik Chamberlin | Sound Design | The American Jesus Christ | 1999 |
| Helen L. Simmons | Costume Design | The Trial of One Short-Sighted Black Woman vs. Mammy Louise and Safreeta Mae | 1999 |
| Felix E. Cochren | Scenic Design | The Trial of One Short-Sighted Black Woman vs. Mammy Louise and Safreeta Mae | 1999 |
| Frances Aronson | Lighting Design | The Old Settler | 1999 |
| August Wilson | Playwright | Jitney | 2000 |
| Arthur French | Supporting Actor | Romeo and Juliet | 2000 |
| Phyllis Bash | Supporting Actress | Grace in the Light | 2000 |
| Roz Davis | Lead Musical Actress | Damn Yankees | 2000 |
| Robert Turner | Lead Musical Actor | Damn Yankees | 2000 |
| Fred Carl | Musical Director | The Bubbly Black Girl Sheds Her Chameleon Skin | 2000 |
| Kirsten Childs | Musical Creator | The Bubbly Black Girl Sheds Her Chameleon Skin | 2000 |
| Rome Neal | Solo Performance | Monk | 2000 |
| Arthur French | Lead Actor | Ceremonies in Dark Old Men | 2000 |
| Christine Campbell | Lead Actress | Indigo Blues | 2000 |
| Wendi Joy Franklin | Lead Actress | Grace in the Light | 2000 |
| Donald Holder | Lighting Design | Jitney | 2000 |
| Shirley Prendergast | Lighting Design | The Dance on Widow's Row | 2000 |
| David Gallo | Scenic Design | Jitney | 2000 |
| Susan Hilferty | Costume Design | Jitney | 2000 |
| Rob Milburn | Sound Design | Jitney | 2000 |
| Marion McClinton | Play Director | Jitney | 2000 |
| Rajendra Ramoon Maharaj | Musical Director | Damn Yankees | 2000 |
| George Faison | Choreography | for colored girls... | 2000 |
| Ah-Keisha McCants | Rising Star | Cafe Millennium | 2000 |
| Rajendra Ramoon Maharaj | Musical Director | Jamaica | 2001 |
| Rajendra Ramoon Maharaj | Choreography | Jamaica | 2001 |
| Charles Randolph-Wright | Choreography | Blue | 2001 |
| Al Freeman Jr. | Supporting Actor | Conflict of Interest | 2001 |
| Beatrice Winde | Supporting Actress | A Lesson Before Dying | 2001 |
| Aixa Kendricks | Lead Musical Actress | OYA | 2001 |
| Tobias Truvillan | Lead Musical Actor | OYA | 2001 |
| Vanessa A. Wright | Musical Director | OYA | 2001 |
| Stephanie Berry | Solo Performance | Shaneequa Chronicles | 2001 |
| Rubin Santiago Hudson | Solo Performance | Lackawanna Blues | 2001 |
| Willis Burks II | Lead Actor | Saint Lucy's Eyes | 2001 |
| Ruby Dee | Lead Actress | Saint Lucy's Eyes | 2001 |
| Michael Gilliam | Lighting Design | Blue | 2001 |
| Jane Reisman | Lighting Design | Saint Lucy's Eyes | 2001 |
| James Leonard Joy | Scenic Design | Blue | 2001 |
| Debra Bauer | Costume Design | Blue | 2001 |
| Kurt Eric Fischer | Sound Design | Blue | 2001 |
| Sheldon Epps | Play Director | Blue | 2001 |
| Chadwick Boseman | Supporting Actor | Urban Transitions: Loose Blossoms | 2002 |
| Mzuri Moyo | Solo Performance | Fannie Lou Hammer Story | 2002 |
| Don Glenn | Playwright | American King Umps | 2002 |
| Robert Perry | Lighting Design | Crowns | 2003 |
| ESosa | Costume Design | Crowns | 2003 |
| Regina Taylor | Musical Director | Crowns | 2003 |
| Linda Twine | Musical Director | Crowns | 2003 |
| Ronald K. Brown | Choreography | Crowns | 2003 |
| Viola Davis | Lead Actress | Intimate Apparel | 2004 |
| Lynda Gravatt | Supporting Actress | Intimate Apparel | 2004 |
| Lynn Nottage | Playwright | Intimate Apparel | 2004 |
| Catherine Zuber | Costume Design | Intimate Apparel | 2004 |
| Derek MeLane | Scenic Design | Intimate Apparel | 2004 |
| George C. Wolfe | Musical Director | Caroline, or Change | 2004 |
| Linda Twine | Musical Director | Caroline, or Change | 2004 |
| Tonya Pinkins | Lead Musical Actress | Caroline, or Change | 2004 |
| Chuck Cooper | Lead Musical Actor | Caroline, or Change | 2004 |
| Jan Weston | Sound Design | Caroline, or Change | 2004 |
| Andre De Shields | Lead Actor | Dream on Monkey Mountain | 2004 |
| Kim Sullivan | Supporting Actor | Dream on Monkey Mountain | 2004 |
| Aaron Black | Lighting Design | Dream on Monkey Mountain | 2004 |
| Dyane Harvey | Choreography | Great Men of Gospel | 2004 |
| Joyce Sylvester | Play Director | Freeda Peoples | 2004 |
| Sarah Jones | Solo Performance | Bridges and Tunnels | 2004 |
| Zora Jhade Howard | Rising Star | Trojan Women | 2004 |
| Ruben Santiago-Hudson | Play Director | Seven Guitars | 2006 |
| Charles Weldon | Supporting Actor | Seven Guitars | 2006 |
| Karen Perry | Costume Design | Seven Guitars | 2006 |
| Darron L. West | Sound Design | Seven Guitars | 2006 |
| Cassandra Medley | Playwright | Relativity | 2006 |
| Baraka De Soliel | Choreography | SANGO, Lord of Thunder | 2006 |
| Todd Davis | Lead Actor | Kingfish, Amos n' Andy | 2006 |
| Yaa Asantewe | Lead Actress | Otis and Zora | 2006 |
| Kevin Maynor | Solo Performance | Paul Robeson | 2006 |
| Marjorie Johnson | Supporting Actress | Hoodoo Love | 2006 |
| Harlan Penn | Scenic Design | Kingfish, Amos n' Andy | 2006 |
| AVAN | Lighting Design | Storm Stories | 2006 |
| Lynn Nottage | Playwright | Ruined | 2009 |
| Saidah Arrika Ekulona | Lead Actress | Ruined | 2009 |
| Quincy Tyler Bernstine | Supporting Actress | Ruined | 2009 |
| Russell G. Jones | Supporting Actor | Ruined | 2009 |
| Paul Tazewell | Costume Design | Ruined | 2009 |
| Derek McLane | Scenic Design | Ruined | 2009 |
| André De Shields | Lead Musical Actor | Archbishop Supreme Tartuffe | 2009 |
| Kim Brockington | Lead Musical Actress | Archbishop Supreme Tartuffe | 2009 |
| Kelvyn Bell | Musical Director | Archbishop Supreme Tartuffe | 2009 |
| Marion McClinton | Play Director | Pure Confidence | 2009 |
| Gavin Lawrence | Lead Actor | Pure Confidence | 2009 |
| Khalil Ashanti | Solo Performance | Basic Training | 2009 |
| Andrew C. Mayer | Sound Design | Pure Confidence | 2009 |
| Matthew Frey | Lighting Design | Zooman and the Sign | 2009 |
| James Carter | Lighting Design | Pecong | 2010 |
| Patrice Davidson | Scenic Design | What Would Jesus Do? | 2010 |
| David Withrow | Costume Design | Pecong | 2010 |
| David D. Wright | Sound Design | Oshun | 2010 |
| Imani | Play Director | Dr. May Edward Chinn | 2010 |
| Akin Babatunde | Musical Director | Blind Lemon Blues | 2010 |
| Byron Easley | Choreography | Langston in Harlem | 2010 |
| Yvette Heyliger | Playwright | What Would Jesus Do? | 2010 |
| Johnnie Mae | Supporting Actress | What Would Jesus Do? | 2010 |
| Jamil A.C. Mangan | Supporting Actor | What Would Jesus Do? | 2010 |
| Glenn Turner | Lead Musical Actor | Langston in Harlem | 2010 |
| Kenita Miller | Lead Musical Actress | Langston in Harlem | 2010 |
| Daniel Beaty | Solo Performance | Through the Night | 2010 |
| Jerome Preston Bates | Lead Actor | What Would Jesus Do? | 2010 |
| Yvonne Farrow | Lead Actress | What Would Jesus Do? | 2010 |
| André De Shields | Lead Actor | Knock Me A Kiss | 2011 |
| Marie Thomas | Supporting Actress | Knock Me A Kiss | 2011 |
| Charles Smith | Playwright | Knock Me A Kiss | 2011 |
| Chuck Smith | Play Director | Knock Me A Kiss | 2011 |
| Shirley Prendergast | Lighting Design | Knock Me A Kiss | 2011 |
| Ali Turns | Costume Design | Knock Me A Kiss | 2011 |
| Anthony Davis | Scenic Design | Knock Me A Kiss | 2011 |
| Bill Toles | Sound Design | Knock Me A Kiss | 2011 |
| Tracy Jack | Choreography | It Ain't Nothin' But the Blues | 2011 |
| Lee Kirk | Musical Director | The Widow and Miss Mamie | 2011 |
| Stephanie Berry | Solo Performance | The Shaneequa Chronicles | 2011 |
| Ron Granger | Musical Director | The Widow and Miss Mamie | 2011 |
| Toni Seawright | Lead Musical Actress | The Widow and Miss Mamie | 2011 |
| Tommi Thompson | Lead Musical Actor | The Widow and Miss Mamie | 2011 |
| André Holland | Supporting Actor | The Whipping Man | 2011 |
| Kimberlee Monroe | Lead Actress | Nobody Knew Where They Was | 2011 |
| Sanaa Latham | Lead Actress | By the Way, Meet Vera Stark | 2011 |
| Eden Sanaa Duncan Smith | Rising Star | Fences; Lion King | 2011 |
| Jeffrey Sweet | Playwright | Court-Martial at Fort Devens | 2012 |
| Mary Beth Easley | Play Director | Court-Martial at Fort Devens | 2012 |
| Mark Bruckner | Sound Design | Court-Martial at Fort Devens | 2012 |
| Ali Turns | Costume Design | Court-Martial at Fort Devens | 2012 |
| Michael Walsh | Musical Director | Sally and Tom: The American Way | 2012 |
| Brian D. Hills | Lead Musical Actor | Sally and Tom: The American Way | 2012 |
| Ava Jenkins | Lead Musical Actress | Sally and Tom: The American Way | 2012 |
| Gabrielle L. Kurlander | Musical Director | Sally and Tom: The American Way | 2012 |
| Johnnie Mae | Lead Actress | Ma Rainey's Black Bottom | 2012 |
| Reginald L. Wilson | Lead Actor | Ma Rainey's Black Bottom | 2012 |
| Peter Jay Fernandez | Supporting Actor | Ma Rainey's Black Bottom | 2012 |
| Thurston Reyes | Lighting Design | Ma Rainey's Black Bottom | 2012 |
| Kimberlee Monroe | Solo Performance | Arye | 2012 |
| Marsha Stephanie Blake | Supporting Actress | Hurt Village | 2012 |
| David Gallo | Scenic Design | Hurt Village | 2012 |
| Lainie Munro | Choreography | Sweet Charity | 2012 |
| Rui Rita | Lighting Design | The Piano Lesson | 2013 |
| Michael Carnahan | Scenic Design | The Piano Lesson | 2013 |
| Karen Perry | Costume Design | The Piano Lesson | 2013 |
| David D. Wright | Sound Design | The Importance of Being Earnest | 2013 |
| Ruben Santiago-Hudson | Play Director | The Piano Lesson | 2013 |
| Keith Lee Grant | Musical Director | Dreamgirls | 2013 |
| Mercedes Elington | Choreography | Storyville | 2013 |
| Colman Domingo | Playwright | Wild With Happy | 2013 |
| Chuck Cooper | Supporting Actor | The Piano Lesson | 2013 |
| Sharon Washington | Supporting Actress | Wild With Happy | 2013 |
| Dion Millington | Lead Musical Actress | Dreamgirls | 2013 |
| Michael Leonard | Lead Musical Actor | Storyville | 2013 |
| Ryan Touhey | Musical Director | Dreamgirls | 2013 |
| Jeannette Bayardelle | Solo Performance | Shida | 2013 |
| Brandon J. Dirden | Lead Actor | The Piano Lesson | 2013 |
| Rosalyn Coleman | Lead Actress | Breakfast with Mugabe | 2013 |
| Thom Weaver | Lighting Design | August Wilson's How I Learned What I Learned | 2014 |
| Patrice Andrew Davidson | Scenic Design | Maid's Door | 2014 |
| Ali Turns | Costume Design | The Fabulous Miss Marie | 2014 |
| Jackie Alexander | Play Director | Maid's Door | 2014 |
| Cheryl L. Davis | Playwright | Maid's Door | 2014 |
| Nate James | Supporting Actor | Maid's Door | 2014 |
| Dee Bridgewater | Lead Musical Actress | Lady Day | 2014 |
| Derrick Baskin | Lead Musical Actor | Piece of My Heart | 2014 |
| Leslie Dockery | Choreography | Ugly Is A Hard Pill | 2014 |
| Roscoe Ormond | Lead Actor | The Fabulous Miss Marie | 2014 |
| Scottie Mills | Lead Actress | Maid's Door | 2014 |
| Helena D. Lewis | Solo Performance | Call Me Crazy | 2014 |
| Antoinette Tynes | Lighting Design | Dutchman | 2015 |
| Chris Cumberbatch | Scenic Design | Black Wall Street | 2015 |
| Emily Rebholz | Costume Design | Our Lady of Kibeho | 2015 |
| Matt Tierney | Sound Design | Our Lady of Kibeho | 2015 |
| Jo Bonney | Play Director | Father Come Home from the Wars | 2015 |
| Lawrence Floyd | Musical Director | Flambeaux | 2015 |
| Katori Hall | Playwright | Our Lady of Kibeho | 2015 |
| Kevin Mambo | Supporting Actor | Brothers From the Bottom | 2015 |
| Toccarra Cash | Supporting Actress | Brothers From the Bottom | 2015 |
| Althea Alexis | Lead Musical Actress | Flambeaux | 2015 |
| J. Bernard Calloway | Lead Musical Actor | Flambeaux | 2015 |
| Juson Williams | Choreography | Flambeaux | 2015 |
| Jeff Bolding | Musical Director | Flambeaux | 2015 |
| John Douglas Thompson | Lead Actor | Tamburlaine, Parts I and II | 2015 |
| S. Epatha Merkeson | Lead Actress | While I Yet Live | 2015 |
| Keith Hamilton Cobb | Solo Performance | American Moor | 2015 |
| Alan C. Edwards | Lighting Design | Macbeth | 2016 |
| G.W. Mercier | Scenic Design | Head of Passes | 2016 |
| Rachel Dozier-Ezell | Costume Design | Macbeth | 2016 |
| Obadiah Eaves | Sound Design | The Total Bent | 2016 |
| Sten Severson | Sound Design | The Total Bent | 2016 |
| Ruben Santiago-Hudson | Play Director | Skeleton Crew | 2016 |
| Jeff Calhoun | Musical Director | Maurice Hines Tappin' Thru Life | 2016 |
| Dominique Morisseau | Playwright | Skeleton Crew | 2016 |
| Kim Sullivan | Supporting Actor | The Piano Lesson | 2016 |
| Alana Arenas | Supporting Actress | Head of Passes | 2016 |
| Tina Fabrique | Lead Musical Actress | The First Noel | 2016 |
| Maurice Hines | Lead Musical Actor | Maurice Hines Tappin' Thru Life | 2016 |
| Maurice Hines | Choreography | Maurice Hines Tappin' Thru Life | 2016 |
| Reginald L. Wilson | Solo Performance | Sugar Ray | 2016 |
| Joe Morton | Lead Actor | Turn Me Loose | 2016 |
| Marjorie Johnson | Lead Actress | Dot | 2016 |
| Kate Bashore | Lighting Design | The Three Musketeers | 2017 |
| Christopher Swader | Scenic Design | The Three Musketeers | 2017 |
| Justin Swader | Scenic Design | The Three Musketeers | 2017 |
| Rachel Dozier-Ezell | Costume Design | The Three Musketeers | 2017 |
| Luqman Brown | Sound Design | The Three Musketeers | 2017 |
| Walter Dallas | Play Director | Autumn | 2017 |
| Robert O'Hara | Musical Director | Bella: An American Tall Tale | 2017 |
| Richard Wesley | Playwright | Autumn | 2017 |
| Count Stovall | Supporting Actor | Autumn | 2017 |
| Paulette Washington | Supporting Actress | Autumn | 2017 |
| NaTasha Yvette Williams | Lead Musical Actress | Bella: An American Tall Tale | 2017 |
| Norm Lewis | Lead Musical Actor | Sweeney Todd | 2017 |
| Darius Smith | Musical Director | Raisin | 2017 |
| Camille A. Brown | Choreography | Bella: An American Tall Tale | 2017 |
| Jerome Preston Bates | Lead Actor | Autumn | 2017 |
| Elizabeth Van Dyke | Lead Actress | Zora Neale Hurston | 2017 |
| Timothy Simonson | Solo Performance | Adam | 2017 |
| Adam Honore | Lighting Design | Carmen Jones | 2018 |
| Chris Cumberbatch | Scenic Design | Harriet's Return | 2018 |
| Ali Turns | Costume Design | A Soldier's Play | 2018 |
| Luqman Brown | Sound Design | The Peculiar Patriot | 2018 |
| Ruben Santiago-Hudson | Play Director | Paradise Blue | 2018 |
| Lee Summers | Musical Director | On Kentucky Avenue | 2018 |
| Dominique Morisseau | Playwright | Paradise Blue | 2018 |
| Gil Tucker | Supporting Actor | A Soldier's Play | 2018 |
| Joniece Abbott-Pratt | Supporting Actress | The House That Will Not Stand | 2018 |
| Ty Stephens | Lead Musical Actor | On Kentucky Avenue | 2018 |
| Anika Noni Rose | Lead Musical Actress | Carmen Jones | 2018 |
| Count Stovall | Supporting Musical Actor | On Kentucky Avenue | 2018 |
| Andricka Hall | Supporting Musical Actress | On Kentucky Avenue | 2018 |
| Shelton Becton | Musical Director | Carmen Jones | 2018 |
| Richard Cummings Jr. | Musical Director | On Kentucky Avenue | 2018 |
| Bill T. Jones | Choreography | Carmen Jones | 2018 |
| Sharon Washington | Solo Performance | Feeding the Dragon | 2018 |
| David Roberts | Lead Actor | The Black Babe Ruth | 2018 |
| Harriett D. Foy | Lead Actress | The House That Will Not Stand | 2018 |
| Antoinette Tynes | Lighting Design | Looking for Leroy | 2019 |
| Chris Cumberbatch | Scenic Design | Looking for Leroy | 2019 |
| Carolyn Adams | Costume Design | The Haunting of Lin Manuel Miranda | 2019 |
| Justin Ellington | Sound Design | Fireflies | 2019 |
| David Wright | Sound Design | The Savage Queen | 2019 |
| Petronia Paley | Play Director | Looking for Leroy | 2019 |
| Larry Muhammad | Playwright | Looking for Leroy | 2019 |
| Kenny Leon | Musical Director | Much Ado About Nothing | 2019 |
| Robert Turner | Supporting Actor | The Haunting of Lin Manuel Miranda | 2019 |
| Roz Fox | Supporting Actress | The Haunting of Lin Manuel Miranda | 2019 |
| Grantham Coleman | Lead Musical Actor | Much Ado About Nothing | 2019 |
| Danielle Brooks | Lead Musical Actress | Much Ado About Nothing | 2019 |
| LaChanze | Lead Musical Actress | The Secret Life of Bees | 2019 |
| Chuck Cooper | Supporting Musical Actor | Much Ado About Nothing | 2019 |
| Eisa Davis | Supporting Musical Actress | The Secret Life of Bees | 2019 |
| Jason Hart | Musical Director | The Secret Life of Bees | 2019 |
| Camille A. Brown | Choreography | Much Ado About Nothing | 2019 |
| Richarda Abrams | Solo Performance | First by Faith: The Life of Macy McLeod Bethune | 2019 |
| Keith Randolph Smith | Lead Actor | Lockdown | 2019 |
| Jessica Frances Dukes | Lead Actress | By the Way, Meet Vera Stark | 2019 |
| Alan C. Edwards | Lighting Design | The New Englanders | 2020 |
| Isabel Curley-Clay | Scenic Design | Reparations | 2020 |
| Moriah Curley-Clay | Scenic Design | Reparations | 2020 |
| Toni-Leslie James | Costume Design | For Colored Girls Who Have Considered Suicide/When the Rainbow is Enuf | 2020 |
| David D. Wright | Sound Design | Reparations | 2020 |
| Michele Shay | Play Director | Reparations | 2020 |
| Tai Thompson | Musical Director | The Dark Star from Harlem: The Spectacular Rise of Josephine Baker | 2020 |
| Leslie Dockery | Choreography | a photograph/lovers in motion | 2020 |
| Donja R. Love | Playwright | One in Two | 2020 |
| Benjamin Mapp | Supporting Actor | Leaving the Blues | 2020 |
| Lisa Arrindell | Supporting Actress | Reparations | 2020 |
| Joshua Henry | Lead Musical Actor | The Wrong Man | 2020 |
| Iris Beaumier | Lead Musical Actress | The Dark Star from Harlem: The Spectacular Rise of Josephine Baker | 2020 |
| James A. Pierce III | Supporting Musical Actor | The Dark Star from Harlem: The Spectacular Rise of Josephine Baker | 2020 |
| Mario E. Sprouse | Musical Director | The Dark Star from Harlem: The Spectacular Rise of Josephine Baker | 2020 |
| Martha Redbone | Musical Composer | For Colored Girls Who Have Considered Suicide/When the Rainbow is Enuf | 2020 |
| Douglas Wade | Solo Performance | Thurgood | 2020 |
| Kamal Bolden | Lead Actor | Reparations | 2020 |
| Teagle F. Bougere | Lead Actor | The New Englanders | 2020 |
| Rosalind Brown | Lead Actress | Leaving the Blues | 2020 |
| Liza Colon-Zayaz | Lead Actress | Halfway Bitches Go Straight to Heaven | 2020 |

The Production of the Year AUDELCO Awards (1975-1981, '83, '85, '87-'89, '95-'01, '03-'04, '06, '09-Present)
| Production | Category | Year |
|---|---|---|
| Black Picture Show | Best Play | 1975 |
| Eden | Best Play | 1976 |
| Young, Gifted, & Broke | Best Musical | 1977 |
| The Last Street Play | Best Play | 1977 |
| Unfinished Women... | Best Play | 1977 |
| High John de Conquer | Best Musical | 1978 |
| The River Niger | Best Play | 1978 |
| Them Niggars Went Thataway | Best Musical | 1979 |
| Inacent Black and the Five Brothers | Best Play | 1979 |
| Dunbar | Best Musical | 1980 |
| Home | Best Play | 1980 |
| When the Chickens Come Home to Roost | Best Play | 1981 |
| Bessie Smith, Empress of the Blues | Best Musical | 1981 |
| Hospice | Best Play | 1983 |
| Champeen | Best Musical | 1983 |
| Long Time Since Yesterday | Best Play | 1985 |
| Flat Street Sa'day Nite | Best Musical | 1985 |
| The Legacy | Best Musical | 1987 |
| Black Medea | Best Play | 1987 |
| Struttin' | Best Musical | 1988 |
| The Fruits of Miss Morning | Best Play | 1988 |
| The Talented Tenth | Best Play | 1989 |
| Song of Sheba | Best Musical | 1989 |
| Blade to the Heat | Best Play | 1995 |
| Shoehorn! | Best Musical | 1995 |
| for colored girls... | Best Ensemble Production | 1995 |
| Joe Turner Has Come and Gone | Best Play | 1997 |
| Bolt from the Blue | Best Play | 1998 |
| Fly | Best Ensemble Production | 1998 |
| Satan Never Sleeps | Best Musical | 1998 |
| The Trial of One Short-Sighted Black Woman vs. Mammy Louise and Safreeta Mae | Best Play | 1999 |
| The Trial of One Short-Sighted Black Woman vs. Mammy Louise and Safreeta Mae | Best Ensemble Production | 1999 |
| Jitney | Best Play | 2000 |
| Jitney | Best Ensemble Production | 2000 |
| Damn Yankees | Best Musical | 2000 |
| Blue | Best Ensemble Production | 2001 |
| Blue | Best Play | 2001 |
| OYA | Best Musical | 2001 |
| Crowns | Best Musical | 2003 |
| Crowns | Best Ensemble Production | 2003 |
| Intimate Apparel | Best Play | 2004 |
| Caroline, or Change | Best Musical | 2004 |
| Great Men of Gospel | Best Ensemble Production | 2004 |
| Seven Guitars | Best Play | 2006 |
| Real Black Men Don't Sit Cross-Legged | Best Ensemble Production | 2006 |
| Ruined | Best Play | 2009 |
| Archbishop Supreme Tartuffe | Best Musical | 2009 |
| Zooman and the Sign | Best Play Revival | 2009 |
| Home | Best Ensemble Production | 2009 |
| What Would Jesus Do? | Best Play | 2010 |
| Langston in Harlem | Best Musical | 2010 |
| August Wilson's Women | Best Ensemble Production | 2010 |
| Pecong | Best Play Revival | 2010 |
| Knock Me A Kiss | Best Play | 2011 |
| The Widow and Miss Mamie | Best Musical | 2011 |
| Ain't Nothin' But the Blues | Best Musical | 2011 |
| Court-Martial at Fort Devens | Best Ensemble Production | 2012 |
| Ma Rainey's Black Bottom | Best Revival | 2012 |
| Renaissance in the Belly of a Killer Whale | Best Ensemble Production | 2012 |
| Sally and Tom: The American Way | Best Musical | 2012 |
| Dreamgirls | Best Musical | 2013 |
| Choir Boy | Best Ensemble Production | 2013 |
| Wild With Happy | Best Play | 2013 |
| The Piano Lesson | Best Revival | 2013 |
| The Old Settler | Best Revival | 2014 |
| Sassy Mamas | Best Ensemble Production | 2014 |
| Maid's Door | Best Play | 2014 |
| Ain't Misbehavin' | Best Revival | 2015 |
| Fences | Best Revival | 2015 |
| Carnaval | Best Ensemble Production | 2015 |
| Our Lady of Kibeho | Best Play | 2015 |
| Flambeaux | Best Musical | 2015 |
| Dead and Breathing | Best Ensemble Production | 2016 |
| In White America | Best Revival | 2016 |
| Maurice Hines Tappin' Thru Life | Best Musical | 2016 |
| Skeleton Crew | Best Play | 2016 |
| Daughters of the Mock | Best Ensemble Production | 2017 |
| Autumn | Best Play | 2017 |
| Bella: An American Tall Tale | Best Musical | 2017 |
| Two Trains Running | Best Revival | 2017 |
| Paradise Blue | Best Ensemble Production | 2018 |
| Sugar in Our Woods | Best Ensemble Production | 2018 |
| Carmen Jones | Best Musical Revival | 2018 |
| A Soldier's Play | Best Play Revival | 2018 |
| The Old Settler | Best Play Revival | 2018 |
| On Kentucky Avenue | Best Musical | 2018 |
| A Small Oak Tree Runs Red | Best Play | 2018 |
| The House That Will Not Stand | Best Play | 2018 |
| Looking for Leroy | Best Ensemble Production | 2019 |
| Caroline, or Change | Best Musical Revival | 2019 |
| Reunion in Bartersville | Best Play Revival | 2019 |
| The Secret Life of Bees | Best Musical | 2019 |
| Looking for Leroy | Best Play | 2019 |
| Native Son | Best Play | 2019 |
| The Dark Star from Harlem: The Spectacular Rise of Josephine Baker | Best Musical | 2020 |
| One in Two | Best Ensemble Production | 2020 |
| Sassy Mamas | Best Ensemble Production | 2020 |
| For Colored Girls Who Have Considered Suicide/When the Rainbow is Enuf | Best Play Revival | 2020 |
| Reparations | Best Play | 2020 |
