= Camille A. Brown =

American dancer

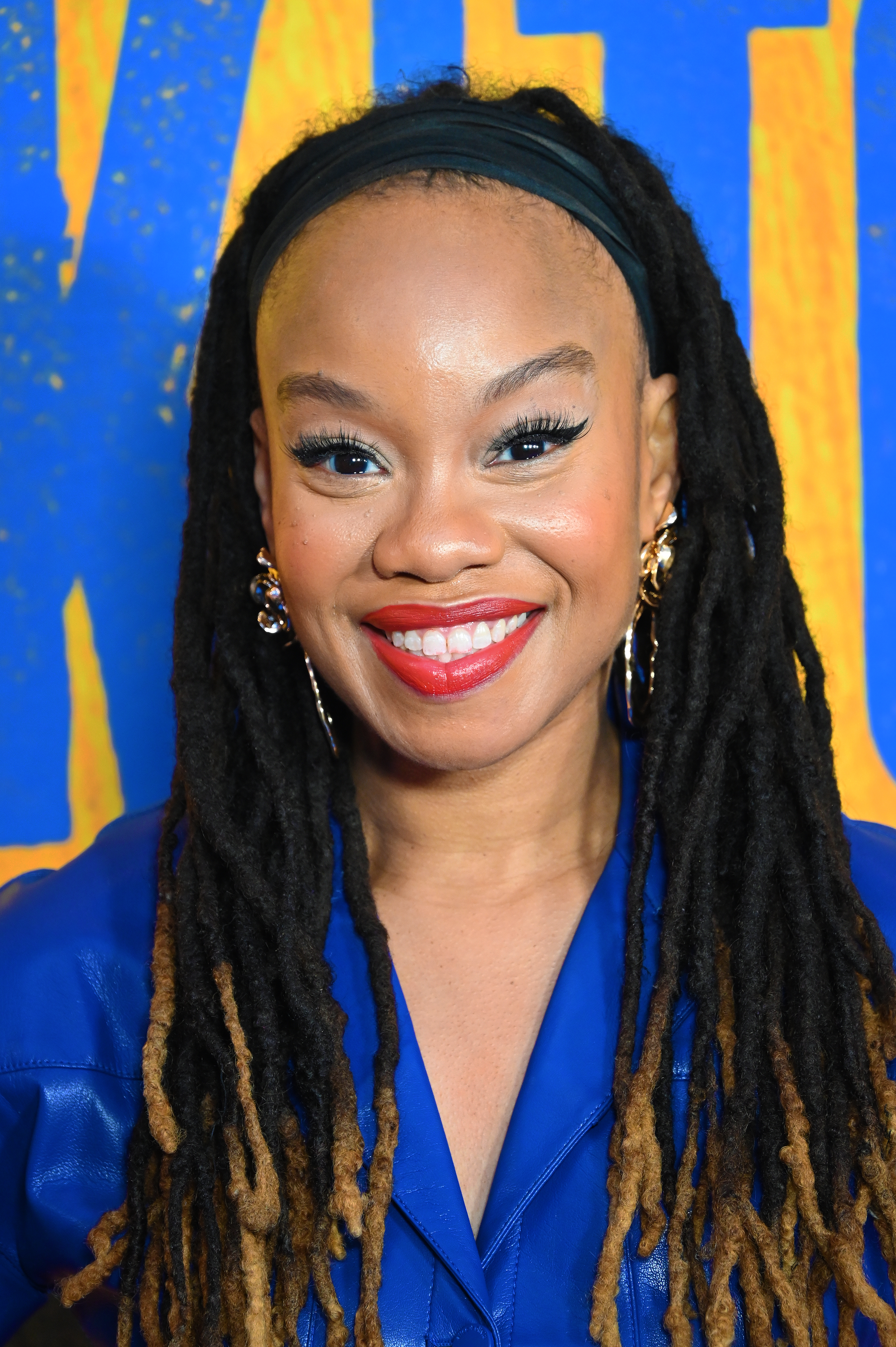
- Brown in 2025
- Born: December 11, 1979 (age 46); New York City, New York, U.S.
- Education: University of North Carolina School of the Arts (BFA)
- Occupations: Dancer; Choreographer; Director; College professor
- Years active: 2000–present
- Awards: Full list
- Website: camilleabrown.org

Camille A. Brown is an American dancer, choreographer, director, and dance educator. She is a five-time Tony Award-nominated director and choreographer who began her career as a professional dancer with Ronald K. Brown's/Evidence company in the early 2000s. In 2006 she founded her own dance company, the Camille A. Brown & Dancers, producing several dance productions, winning a Princess Grace Award and a Bessie Award.

Since 2010s Brown worked on stage musical productions, including Robert O'Hara's Bella: An American Tall Tale, Michael Arden's Once On This Island and Kenny Leon's Much Ado About Nothing, winning two Audelco Award and being nominated at the Drama Desk Awards and Lucille Lortel Awards. For her choreography direction on 2019 Choir Boy, she was nominated at the Tony Award for Best Choreography.

Brown made her directorial debut with for colored girls who have considered suicide/when the rainbow is enuf (2022) for which she was nominated for the Best Direction of a Play and Best Choreography. She was also nominated for the Tony Award for Best Choreography for the Alicia Keys's musical Hell's Kitchen (2023) and Gypsy (2024). She worked on the NBC special Jesus Christ Superstar Live in Concert (2018).

== Early life and education ==
Camille A. Brown was born and raised in the neighborhood of Jamaica, Queens in New York City. Since she was a child she studied dance and performing arts at the local Bernice Johnson Cultural Arts Center and at the DeVore Dance Center. She continued her studying in high school at Fiorello H. LaGuardia High School of Music & Art and the Performing Arts while simultaneously attending The Ailey School on scholarship. Brown earned a Bachelor of Fine Arts from the University of North Carolina School of the Arts.

== Career ==
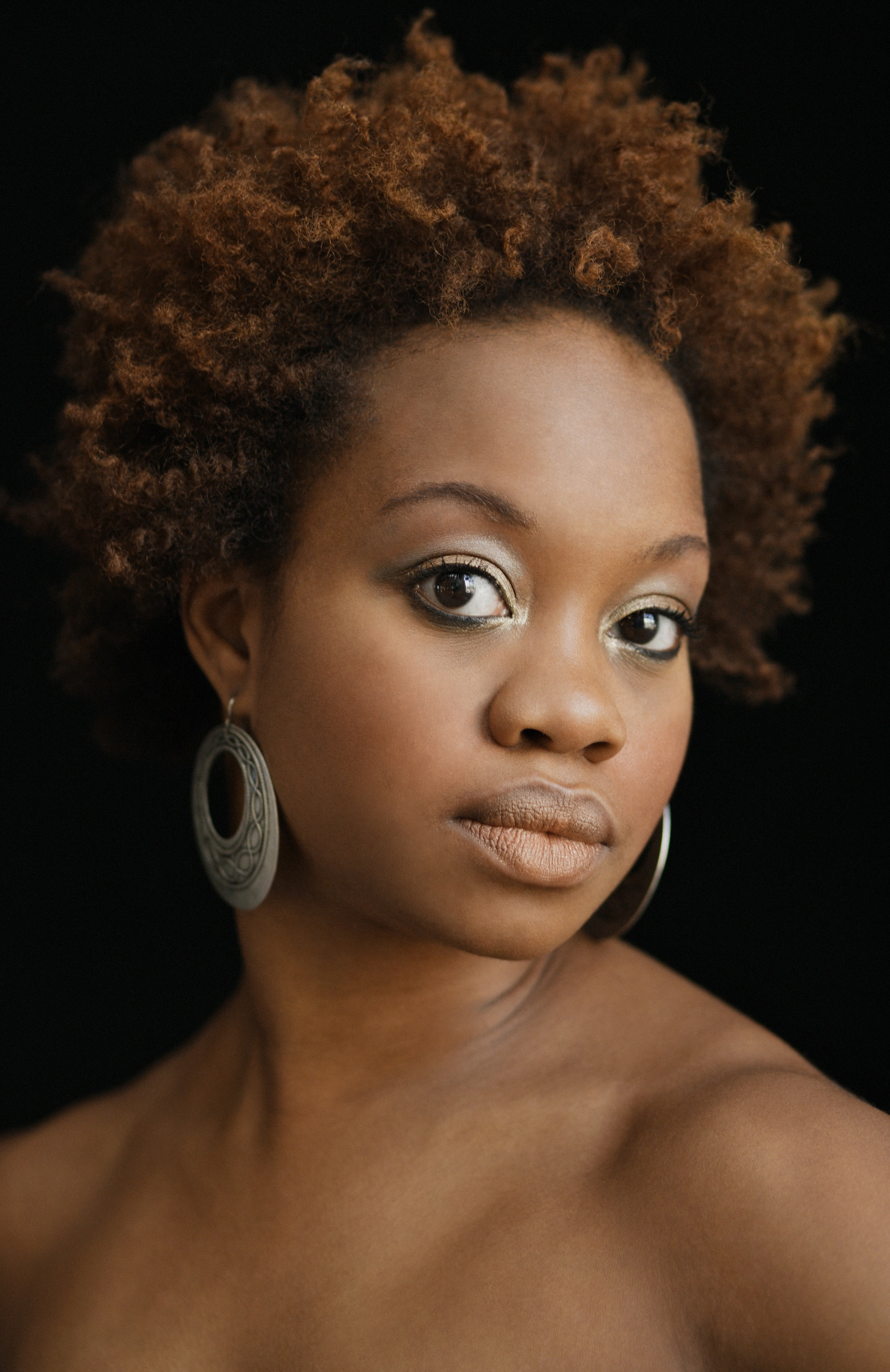
Brown in 2005.

After graduating, Brown danced professionally with Ronald K. Brown's Evidence, A Dance Company from 2001 to 2007, and was a guest artist with Rennie Harris Puremovement and the Alvin Ailey American Dance Theater. Between 2004 and 2005, she performed in two concert dance works with Urban Bush Women. In 2006, Brown founded Camille A. Brown & Dancers. The company has performed works such as ink, the Bessie Award-winning Mr. TOL E. RAncE, the Bessie Award-nominated BLACK GIRL: Linguistic Play, City of Rain, Good & Grown, and The Groove to Nobody's Business, among others. The company has performed internationally at venues and festivals including the Kennedy Center, NYU Abu Dhabi, The Joyce Theater, New York City Center's Fall for Dance Festival, Lincoln Center for the Performing Arts, Jacob's Pillow Dance Festival, Bates Dance Festival, The Yard, White Bird, REDCAT, and Belfast Festival at Queen's.

Informed by her music background as a clarinetist, Brown creates choreography that utilizes musical composition as storytelling. Brown has choreographed for various commercial and theater projects including Choir Boy, Once On This Island, Jesus Christ Superstar Live in Concert!, Nike/Air Jordan, BELLA: An American Tall Tale (directed by Robert O'Hara), Cabin in the Sky (musical) (Director: Ruben Santiago-Hudson), and Broadway's A Streetcar Named Desire. Dance companies that have commissioned her work include: Alvin Ailey American Dance Theater, Philadanco, Urban Bush Women, Complexions, Ailey II, and Ballet Memphis. Her works have been performed at The Kennedy Center, Apollo Theatre, Brooklyn Academy of Music, Madison Square Garden, and New York City Center. She also was the choreographer for Saverio Palatella's line, Wholegarment 3D, for New York Fashion Week in 2008.

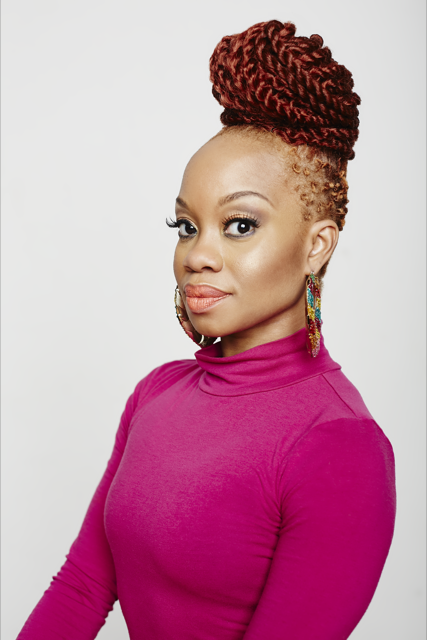
Brown in 2016.

In 2018 Brown choreographed Choir Boy at the Samuel J. Friedman Theatre by Trip Cullman, for which she was nominated at the Tony Award for Best Choreography.

In 2019 Brown debuted at The Public Theater as Off-Broadway choreographer with production of Ntozake Shange's for colored girls who have considered suicide/when the rainbow is enuf. In 2021 was announced that the production was moved to Broadway Booth Theatre, becoming the first black woman to direct and choreograph a Broadway production in six decades. The musical was praised by critics, being nominated at the Drama Desk Award, Drama League Award, Lucille Lortel Awards and received seven nominations at the 75th Tony Awards, including for Best Direction of a Play and Best Choreography.

In 2019, Brown choreographed Porgy & Bess for The Metropolitan Opera, as well as co-directed with James Robinson on Terence Blanchard's Fire Shut Up In My Bones (2021) and choreographed Terence Blanchard's Champion (2023), both also at The Metropolitan Opera.

In 2023 she was involved as choreographer for Alicia Keys's Off-Broadway mucial Hell's Kitchen. In April 2024 the production moved to Broadway at the Shubert Theatre, being critical acclaimed and earning thirteen nominations at the 77th Tony Awards, including for Best Choreography for Brown. She won the Chita Rivera Award for Outstanding Choreography and the Audelco Award for Best Choreographer.

In 2025, Brown was announced as director and choreographer of a Broadway revival of Dreamgirls, which was postponed beyond its planned fall 2026 opening. She was also commissioned to create Mouth of Mississippi for the National Black Theatre.

In September 2026, Brown was named the next Claude and Alfred Mann Endowed Artist in Dance at the USC Glorya Kaufman School of Dance, beginning in fall 2027.

== Activism and charity ==
In 2014, Brown founded two initiatives: The Gathering, an annual open forum for intergenerational Black female artists to advocate for greater cultural equity and acknowledgement in the dance world; and BLACK GIRL SPECTRUM (BGS), a community engagement initiative.

On June 4, 2016, BGS had its inaugural symposium with the theme “Social Dance for Social Change” at Barbara Ann Teer's National Black Theatre in Harlem, NY.

In 2018, Brown created a community engagement platform, Every Body Move (EBM), to serve as the umbrella for all initiatives that bring the artistic rigor of Camille A. Brown & Dancers’ beyond the stage and into communities. Every Body Move works to cultivate the creative capacity of its participants through workshops, summer intensives, artistic encounters, educational experiences, public actions, and celebrations for people of diverse abilities, identities, and ages. The initiative includes: Black Girl Spectrum (BGS); Black Men Moving (BMM); The Gathering; Creative Action Lab; Every Body Move Celebration.

In 2022 Brown partnered with Google Arts & Culture on a project for Black History Month exploring the story of Black history and culture through dance where "ink" was highlighted and filmed at Brooklyn Historical Society. Brown also teaches dance and gives lectures to audiences at various universities such as Long Island University, Barnard College and ACDFA (University of Akron).

== Credits ==
=== Theatre ===
Title	Years	Location	Ref.
A Streetcar Named Desire	2012	Broadhurst Theatre, Broadway	
Soul Doctor	2012	New York Theatre Workshop, Off-Broadway	
The Fortress of Solitude	2014	The Joseph Papp Public Theater, Off-Broadway	
Once On This Island	2017	Circle in the Square Theatre, Broadway	
Bella: An American Tall Tale	2017	Delacorte Theater, Off-Broadway	
This Ain't No Disco	2018	Linda Gross Theater, Off-Broadway	
Much Ado About Nothing	2019	Delacorte Theater, Off-Broadway	
Toni Stone	2019	Laura Pels Theatre, Off-Broadway	
for colored girls who have considered suicide/when the rainbow is enuf	2019	The Public Theater, Off-Broadway	
Choir Boy	2019	Samuel J. Friedman Theatre, Broadway	
for colored girls who have considered suicide/when the rainbow is enuf	2022	Booth Theatre, Broadway	
Hamlet	2023	Delacorte Theater, Off-Broadway	
Hell's Kitchen	2023	The Public Theater, Off-Broadway	
Hell's Kitchen	2024	Shubert Theatre, Broadway	
Gypsy	2024	Majestic Theatre, Broadway	

Other productions

Title	Years	Location	Notes
Awakened in Slumber	2002-2023	U.S. National Tour	Concert dance by Hubbard Street Dance Chicago;
Shelter of Presence	2004		Concert dance by Urban Bush Women;
Nahum	2005	Alliance of Resident Theatres (New York City)	Concert dance by Alvin Ailey American Dance;
New Second Line	2006		Concert dance by Reflections Dance Company;
The Groove To Nobody's Business	2007	Alliance of Resident Theatres (New York City)	Concert dance by Alvin Ailey American Dance;

- 2002 (Hubbard Street 2)
- 2004 Demetia's Serenity (Camille A. Brown)
- 2005 More Time Than Anybody (Camille A. Brown & Dancers)
- 2005 Shelter of Presence (Camille A. Brown)
- 2005 Nahum (Ailey II)
- 2006 Afro Blue (Reflections Dance Company)
- 2006 New Second Line (Reflections Dance Company)
- 2006 More Time Than Anybody (Camille A. Brown & Dancers)
- 2007 The Evolution of a Secured Feminine (Alvin Ailey American Dance Theater)
- 2007 Here We Go...Again?! (Urban Bush Women)
- 2007 The Groove To Nobody's Business (Alvin Ailey American Dance Theater)
- 2008 Saverio Palatella's line – Wholegarment 3D (New York Fashion Week)
- 2008 Un Festin Divin (Ballet Memphis)
- 2008 Matchstick (Camille A. Brown & Dancers)
- 2009 The Groove To Nobody's Business (Alvin Ailey American Dance Theater)
- 2009 The Blues On Beale (Ballet Memphis)
- 2009 Good Times, Ha! (The Youth American Grand Prix)
- 2009 Those Who See Light (Philadelphia Dance Company – Philadanco!)
- 2010 Our Honeymoon Is Over (Dallas Black Dance Theater)
- 2010 Been There, Done That (Camille A. Brown & Dancers)
- 2010 City of Rain (Camille A. Brown & Dancers)
- 2010 By Way of East (Kyle Abraham & Camille A. Brown)
- 2010 The Evolution of a Secured Feminine (Alvin Ailey American Dance Theater)
- 2012 Strum (Toni Pierce Sands and Uri Sands Dance (TU Dance))
- 2012 One Second Past the Future (Camille A. Brown & Dancers)
- 2012 Memories (Complexions Contemporary Ballet)
- 2012 Bind (The Juilliard School)
- 2012 Pins & Needles: FUREE (Director Ken Rus Schmoll)
- 2012 HOUSE (Director Saheem Ali)
- 2012 Fortress of Solitude (Director Daniel Aukin)
- 2012 A Streetcar Named Desire (Director Emily Mann)
- 2013 William Shakespeare's The Winter's Tale (Director Rebecca Taichman)
- 2013 MR. TOL. E RAncE (Camille A. Brown & Dancers)
- 2014 The Box: A Black Comedy (Director: Seth Bockley)
- 2014 tick, tick...BOOM! (Director: Oliver Butler)
- 2014 GALOIS (Director: Victor Maog)
- 2014 The Fortress of Solitude (The Public Theater)
- 2015 Blood Quilt (Director: Kamilah Forbes)
- 2015 Stagger Lee (Director: Patricia McGregor)
- 2015 Cabin in the Sky (musical) (Director: Ruben Santiago-Hudson)
- 2015 BLACK GIRL: Linguistic Play (Camille A. Brown & Dancers)
- 2016 BELLA: An American Tall Tale (Director: Robert O'Hara)
- 2016 Nike/Air Jordan Web Commercial with Russell Westbrook
- 2017 ink (Camille A. Brown & Dancers)
- 2018 Jesus Christ Superstar Live in Concert! on NBC
- 2019 Toni Stone (Roundabout Theatre, Director: Pam MacKinnon)
- 2019 Much Ado About Nothing (Shakespeare in the Park, Director: Kenny Leon)
- 2019 Once (Pittsburgh Civic Light Opera, Director: J. Michael Zygo)
- 2019 Porgy & Bess (The Metropolitan Opera, Director: James Robinson)
- 2019 for colored girls who have considered suicide/when the rainbow is enuf ( The Public Theater, Director: Leah C. Gardiner)
- 2020 Ma Rainey's Black Bottom (Netflix)
- 2021 Angry, Raucous and Shamelessly Gorgeous (Spotlight On Plays)
- 2021 Fire Shut Up in My Bones (The Metropolitan Opera)
- 2021 Toni Stone (Arena Stage)
- 2023 Hell's Kitchen (The Public Theater)
- 2024 Gypsy (Majestic Theatre)

=== Film and television ===
- 2022 Harlem (Amazon Prime Video)

== Awards and nominations ==
Award	Year	Category	Work/Nominee	Result	Ref.
Antonyo Awards	2020	Best Choreography	for colored girls who have considered suicide/when the rainbow is enuf	Won	
Antonyo Awards	2020	Best Quarantine Content	for colored girls who have considered suicide/when the rainbow is enuf	Nominated	
Antonyo Awards	2022	Best Direction (Broadway)	for colored girls who have considered suicide/when the rainbow is enuf	Nominated	
Antonyo Awards	2022	Best Direction (Broadway)	for colored girls who have considered suicide/when the rainbow is enuf	Won	
Audelco Award	2017	Best Choreography	Bella: An American Tall Tale	Won	
Audelco Award	2019	Best Choreography	Much Ado About Nothing	Won	
Audelco Award	2019	Best Choreography	Toni Stone	Nominated	
Bessie Awards	2011	Outstanding Performance	The Evolution of A Secured Feminine	Nominated	
Bessie Awards	2014	Outstanding Performance	Mr. Tolerance	Won	
Bessie Awards	2016	Outstanding Performance	BLACK GIRL: Linguistic Play	Nominated	
Bessie Awards	2022	Outstanding Performance	Fire Shut Up in My Bones	Nominated	
Black Theatre Alliance Awards	2006	Best Choreography	The Groove To Nobody's Business	Nominated	
Chita Rivera Awards for Dance and Choreography	2018	Outstanding Choreographer	Once On This Island	Nominated	
Chita Rivera Awards for Dance and Choreography	2022	Outstanding Choreography in a Broadway Show	for colored girls who have considered suicide/when the rainbow is enuf	Nominated	
Chita Rivera Awards for Dance and Choreography	2024	Outstanding Choreography in a Broadway Show	Hell's Kitchen	Won	
Callaway Award	2020	SDCF Award	Much Ado About Nothing	Finalist	
Doris Duke Performing Artist Award	2015	Sperical Honor	Herself	Won	
Drama Desk Award	2018	Outstanding Choreography	Once On This Island	Nominated	
Drama Desk Award	2019	Outstanding Choreography	Choir Boy	Nominated	
Drama Desk Award	2020	Outstanding Choreography	for colored girls who have considered suicide/when the rainbow is enuf	Nominated	
Drama Desk Award	2024	Outstanding Choreography	Hell's Kitchen	Nominated	
Drama League Award	2022	Outstanding Direction of a Play	for colored girls who have considered suicide/when the rainbow is enuf	Nominated	
International Association of Blacks in Dance	2013	The Founder's Award	Herself	Won	
Lucille Lortel Awards	2015	Outstanding Choreographer	Fortress of Solitude	Nominated	
Lucille Lortel Awards	2018	Outstanding Choreographer	Bella: An American Tall Tale	Nominated	
Lucille Lortel Awards	2020	Outstanding Choreographer	Toni Stone	Nominated	
Lucille Lortel Awards	2020	Outstanding Choreographer	For Colored Girls Who Have Considered Suicide / When the Rainbow Is Enuf	Nominated	
Lucille Lortel Awards	2024	Outstanding Choreographer	Hell's Kitchen	Nominated	
Mariam McGlone Emerging Choreographer Awards	2012	College Women and Culture Award	Herself	Won	
Obie Award	2020	Sustained Excellence in Choreography	Herself	Won	
Outer Critics Circle Award	2018	Outstanding Choreography	Once On This Island	Nominated	
Outer Critics Circle Award	2022	Outstanding Choreography	for colored girls who have considered suicide/when the rainbow is enuf	Nominated	
Outer Critics Circle Award	2022	Outstanding Director of a Play	for colored girls who have considered suicide/when the rainbow is enuf	Nominated	
Princess Grace Awards	2006	Choreography Award	Here We Go...Again?!	Won	
Princess Grace Awards	2016	Choreographic Mentorship Co-Commission Award	Herself	Won	
Princess Grace Awards	2016	Statue Award	Herself	Won	
Tony Award	2019	Best Choreography	Choir Boy	Nominated	
Tony Award	2022	Best Direction of a Play	for colored girls who have considered suicide/when the rainbow is enuf	Nominated	
Tony Award	2022	Best Choreography	for colored girls who have considered suicide/when the rainbow is enuf	Nominated	
Tony Award	2024	Best Choreography	Hell's Kitchen	Nominated	
Tony Award	2025	Best Choreography	Gypsy	Nominated	

== Recognition ==
Brown has received awards and accolades including being a five-time Princess Grace Award recipient, Tony Award Nominee for best Choreography for Choir Boy, TED Fellow, Guggenheim Fellowship, Doris Duke Performing Artist Award, Obie Award, Dance Magazine Award Honoree, USA Jay Franke & David Herro Fellow, and a Bessie Award. She has been featured on the cover of Dance Magazine (April 2018) and Dance Teacher Magazine (August 2015).

She has also been recognized with the:

- 1997 - The Helen Tamiris Award – Performance
- 1997 - Young Artist's Award – Performance
- 1997 - Presidential Scholar of the Arts Award – Dance Performance; Young Artist's Award – Performance; The Helen Tamiris Award – Performance
- 2013 - Princess Grace Works in Progress Residency
- 2015 - USA Jay Franke & David Herro Fellow
- 2015 - TED Fellow
- 2016 - Jacob's Pillow Dance Award
- 2016 - Guggenheim Fellowship
- 2017 - Ford Foundation Art of Change Fellow
- 2017 - Irma P. Hall Black Theater Nomination (BELLA: An American Tall Tale)
- 2017 - Black Woman Scholar Warrior Award (Montclair State University)
- 2018 - Cover Girl of Dance Magazine (April)
- 2019 - Choreography Mentorship Co-Commission (CMCC) Award (Princess Grace Award)
- 2020 - Dance Magazine Award Honoree
- 2020 - Emerson Collective Fellow
- 2021 - ISPA Distinguished Artist Award
- 2022- Kennedy Center Next 50
- 2024- Dance Lab New York Honoree
- 2025 - Elected to the American Academy of Arts and Sciences.
