= Judy Dearing =

American designer (1940–1995)

- Born: 1940; New York, NY
- Died: September 30, 1995 (aged 54–55)
- Education: City College of New York
- Occupations: Costume designer, dancer, choreographer
- Employer(s): Alvin Ailey American Dance Theater, Howard University, University of Texas
- Known for: Costume design
- Notable work: Original costume design for A Soldier's Play (premiered November 20, 1981), for colored girls who have considered suicide / when the rainbow is enuf (premiered September 15, 1976), Once on This Island (premiered October 18, 1990)
- Spouse: John Parks
- Awards: Nine AUDELCO Awards, a 1985 Obie Awards and a 1988 Beverly Hills/Hollywood NAACP Image Award

Judy Dearing (1940 – September 30, 1995) was an American costume designer, dancer, and choreographer. She is best known for designing costumes for a wide range of theater and musical productions, including Charles Fuller's Pulitzer Prize-winning drama A Soldier's Play and the 1976 stage adaptation of Ntozake Shange's book for colored girls who have considered suicide / when the rainbow is enuf.

== Biography ==
Judy Dearing grew up in Manhattan and graduated from City College of New York, majoring in mathematics and science. She began her performance arts career dancing with Miriam Makeba and acting with the Negro Ensemble Company. Her husband was John Parks, a dancer who collaborated with her on a number of dance productions.

Dearing was a resident designer for the Crossroads Theatre, the University of Texas Drama Department, the New Federal Theatre, and the Negro Ensemble Company, as well as for the Alvin Ailey American Dance Theater. She designed costumes for a number of regional theaters: Goodman Theatre, the Alliance Theatre, the Hartford Stage, the Guthrie Theatre, the Milwaukee Repertory Theatre, GeVa Theatre, Asolo Theatre, Kennedy Center, Mark Taper Forum, the Egg, and the Goodspeed Opera House. She designed costumes for broadway productions of for colored girls..., A Raisin in the Sun, Porgy and Bess, A Streetcar Named Desire, and Joe Turner's Come and Gone.

In addition, Dearing was a professor of design at Howard University and resident designer at the University of Texas drama department.

Dearing was a recipient of nine AUDELCO Awards, a 1985 Obie Award and a 1988 Beverly Hills/Hollywood NAACP Image Award. She won the Obie Award her for her World War II uniforms for Charles Fuller's Pulitzer Prize winning drama "A Soldier's Play." She died at New York Hospital in 1995 of acute pneumonia.

== Productions ==
=== Theater ===
Judy Dearing was the costume designer for the following productions.

- Swinging on a Star (original music revue, dedicated to Costume Designer: Judy Dearing, Oct 22, 1995 - Jan 13, 1996)
- Having Our Say (original play, Apr 06, 1995 - Dec 31, 1995)
- Shimada (original play, Apr 23, 1992 - Apr 25, 1992)
- Once on This Island (original musical, Oct 18, 1990 - Dec 01, 1991)
- Checkmates (original play, comedy, Aug 04, 1988 - Dec 31, 1988)
- Death and the King's Horseman (original play, drama, Mar 01, 1987 - Mar 29, 1987)
- The Babe (original play, solo, May 17, 1984 - May 20, 1984)
- Trick (original play, comedy, Thriller, Feb 04, 1979 - Feb 11, 1979)
- The Mighty Gents (original play, Apr 16, 1978 - Apr 23, 1978)
- for colored girls who have considered suicide / when the rainbow is enuf (original play, Sep 15, 1976 - Jul 16, 1978)
- The Poison Tree (original play, Jan 08, 1976 - Jan 11, 1976)
- Lamppost Reunion (original play, Oct 16, 1975 - Dec 21, 1975)
- Black Picture Show (original play, Jan 06, 1975 - Feb 09, 1975)
- What the Wine-Sellers Buy (original play, Feb 14, 1974 - Mar 17, 1974

=== Dance ===
Dearing was the costume designer for the following productions at Alvin Ailey American Dance Theater:

- Nubian Lady
- Blood Burning Moon
- Inside

== Style ==
Dearing's designs were celebrated for their authenticity. She developed a folkloric look for the 1990 production of Once on This Island, using printed kente cloth, Dutch cotton prints, raw silk, and chiffon with metallics. "A costume has to appear natural", Ms. Dearing said in an interview that year with The New York Times. "Every night", she added, "everything has to be set up to look realistic." The Times article indicates that the authenticity of her World War II uniforms is what won her the Obie award for A Soldier's Play.

In the 2010 edition of Ntozake Shange's book, for colored girls who have considered suicide / when the rainbow is enuf, the author describes Dearing's costumes in the book's 1976-78 theater adaptation:

The fluid dresses, designed by the late Judy Dearing, took on colors from the set design, imbuing each lady with a persona and each persona with a unique deific principle marking the journey of womanhood. The personal story of a woman became every woman, the solo voice becoming many. Each poem fell into its rightful place, a rainbow of colors, shapes, and timbres of voice, my solo instrument blossoming into a cosmic chamber ensemble.

In 1996, The Black Theatre Network established the biennial Judy Dearing Design Competition to encourage African American students of design.
