= The Harlem KW Project =

Theatrical company in New York City, US

Harlem KW Project is a theatrical company in Harlem in New York City, created by Jaylene Clark Owens, Hollis Heath, Janelle Heatley, and Chyann Sapp. These women wrote the AUDELCO winning play, Renaissance in the Belly of a Killer Whale. The play focuses on the rich culture and history of Harlem. Each year since 2012, the women have been making adaptations and changes to the play. Owens is the director of the play. The play incorporates several modes of art such as spoken word, poetry, theatre, and song. On March 16, 2011, The Harlem KW Project was read at the Schomburg Center for Research in Black Culture, New York Public Library. Renaissance in the Belly of a Killer Whale began as a result of a Facebook status. Jaylene Clark Owens randomly posted a poetic Facebook status and referenced Harlem to the belly of a killer whale in her post. The KW references the killer whale.
