= Rajendra Ramoon Maharaj =

American playwright and theater director

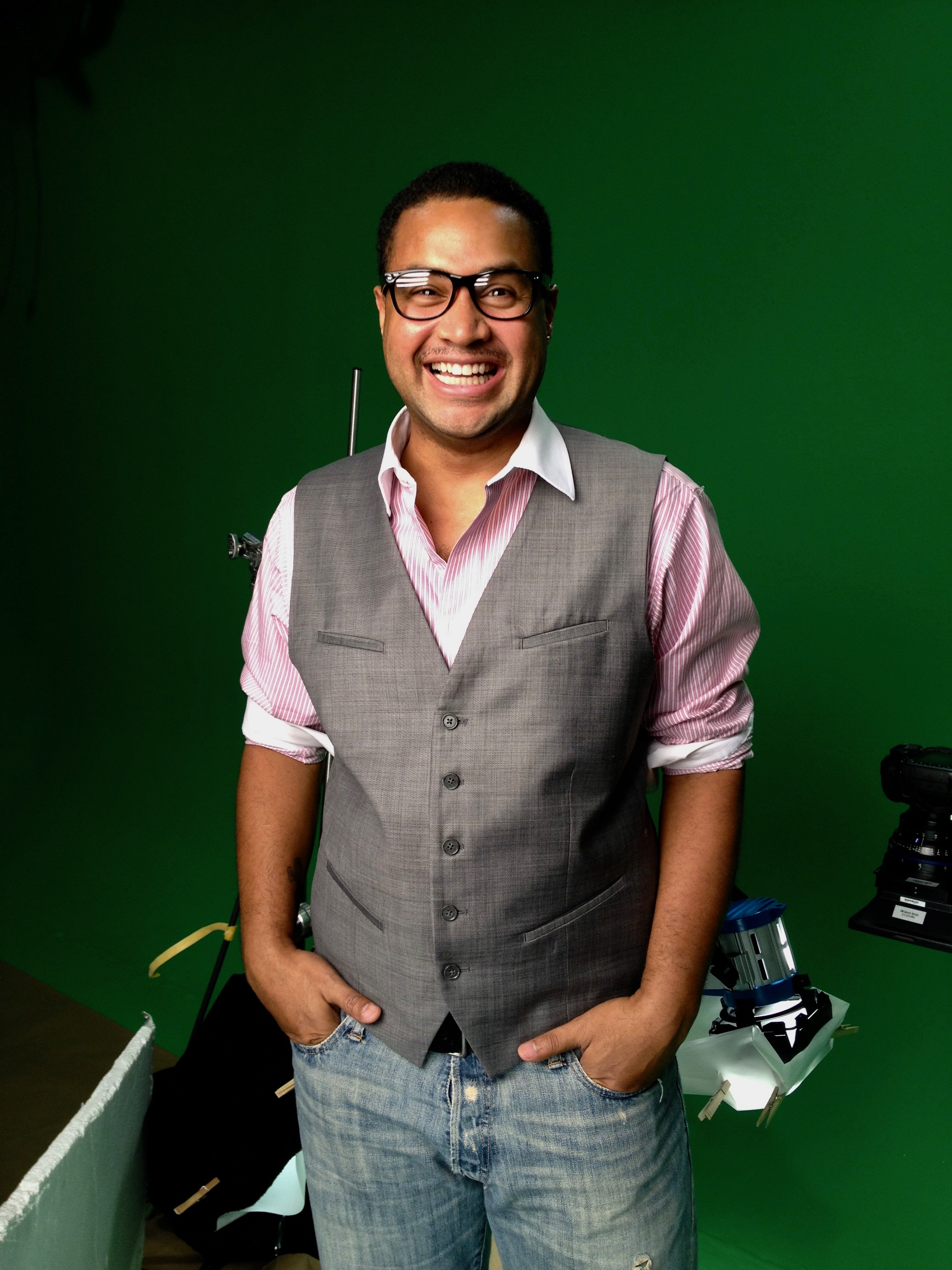
- Born: Rajendra Ramoon Maharaj; Brooklyn, New York, USA
- Website: Rajendra Maharaj Official Website

Rajendra Ramoon Maharaj is an Indo-Afro-Caribbean American theater director, playwright, producer and activist. He holds an associate degree in Criminal Justice from St. John's University, a Bachelor of Arts in Communication Arts from St. John's University, and a Master of Fine Arts in Theatrical Directing from Brooklyn College. He was the Associate Artistic Producer of Milwaukee Repertory Theater. He started Rebel Theater Company in 2003 in New York City, and served as Producing Artistic Director. He was the former Artistic Director of New Freedom Theatre in Philadelphia. He is the Third Vice President for the Brooklyn Branch of the National Association for the Advancement of Colored People (NAACP). He is the Chair of the Equity in the Arts and Culture Committee for the NAACP Brooklyn Branch. He was the former artistic director at American Stage in Florida before stepping down for personal reasons after 6 months.

== Career ==
As a director, Maharaj has worked on Broadway, off-Broadway, and at regional theaters. New York City selected directing/choreography credits include: The Public Theatre (365 Days, Memphis Minnie workshop), Classical Theatre of Harlem (Marat Sade), Lark Play Development Center (Man Measures Man, Breathe), Woodie King Jr.'s New Federal Theatre (Diss Diss and Diss Dat), Rebel Theater (Mother Emanuel - 2016 NY Fringe Festival), Othello: The Panther, Salome: Da Voodoo Princess of Nawlins, Black Footnotes, Trail of Tears, R+J: An Uncivil Tale - Choreographer), Making Books Sing (Band of Angels, Shelter in my Car, Chachajis Cup), Amas Musical Theatre (Bubbling Brown Sugar, Damn Yankees, Mamma I Want to Sing, Magpie).

His regional credits include: New Freedom Theatre (Mother Emanuel, An America Musical Play The Ballad of Trayvon Martin, Jamaica, Don't Bother Me, I Can't Cope (Barrymore Recommended), The Black Nativity and Walk Through Time, by Pulitzer Prize Recipient - Lynn Nottage - World Premiere), Passage Theatre (Little Rock - 2015 Barrymore Award - Outstanding Ensemble in a Play,.

Maharaj is the former Associate Artistic Director of Syracuse Stage.

He is the recipient of the Woodie King Jr. Award for Outstanding Direction, four Vivian Robinson AUDELCO awards for his direction and choreography, and the inaugural 2020 National Alliance for Musical Theatre (N.A.M.T.) Fifteen-Minute Musical Theatre Challenge Award. He received grants for the Van Lier Directing Fellowship, Brooklyn Arts Council Grant, Winthrop Rockefeller Grant, Doris Duke Charitable Grant, Andrew W. Mellon Grant and Time Warner Diverse Voices Grant. Maharaj is an alumnus of Lincoln Center Directors Lab, TCG Young Leaders of Color in the American Theater, and New Orleans Writers Residency 2020, and 2020 Letter of Marque Playwright in Residence.

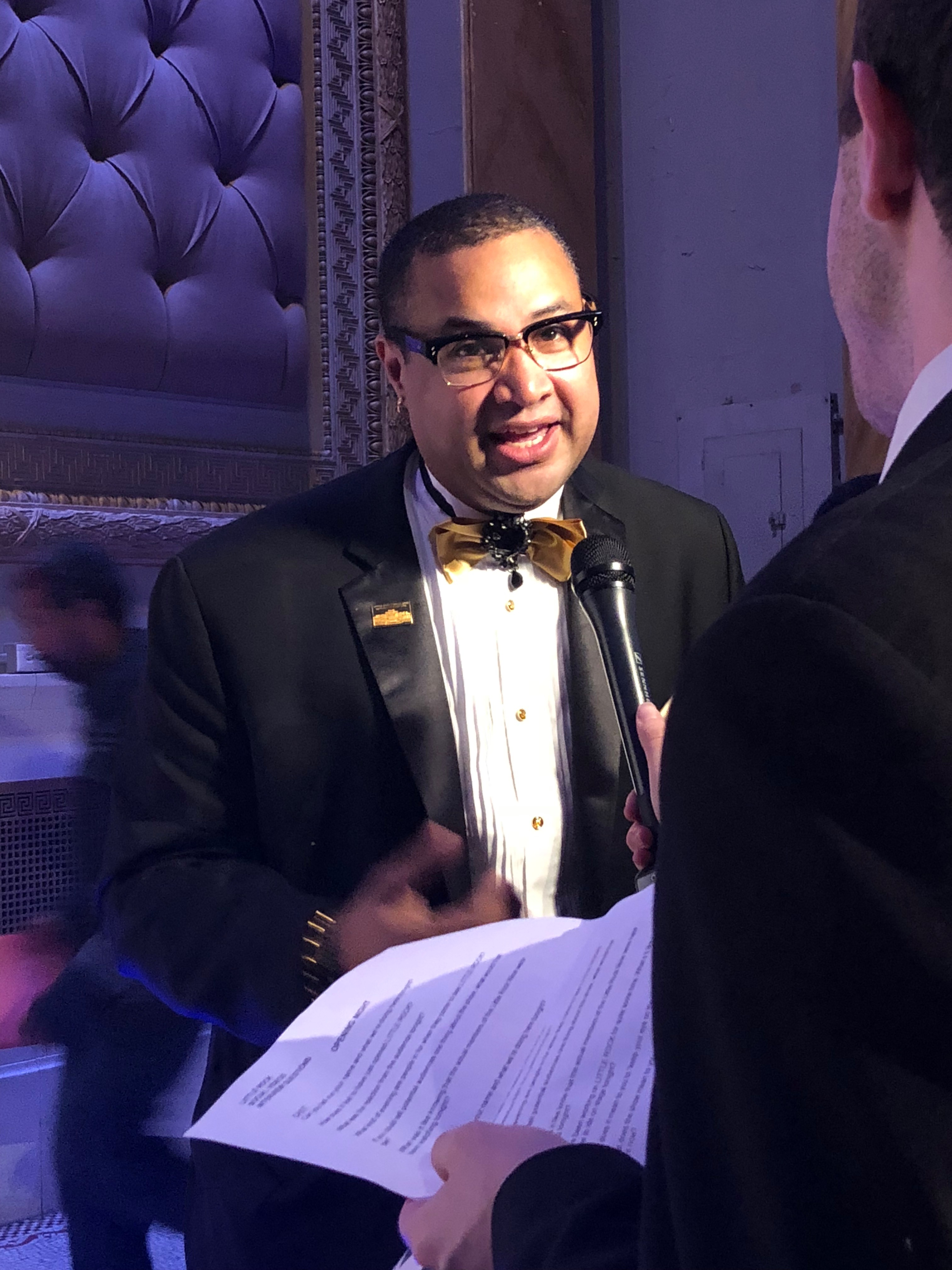
Maharaj at the Opening Night of Little Rock Off Broadway

== Little Rock ==
As a playwright, Maharaj has authored several plays, including Little Rock, a historical drama about the Little Rock Nine. Maharaj spent thirteen years interviewing members of The Little Rock Nine, the first nine African American teenagers who integrated Little Rock Central High School. The play had its developmental premiere at Arkansas Repertory Theatre. It received another developmental production as part of the 2011 New Works Festival at TheatreWorks in Palo Alto, California. It went on to receive a production in 2014 at Passage Theatre in Trenton, NJ where it won the 2015 Barrymore Award for Outstanding Ensemble in a Play.

In 2018 it made its New York Off-Broadway premiere at The Sheen Center for Thought & Culture.

== Additional writing credits ==
=== Produced work ===
- Sweet Lorraine
- Little Rock
- Mother Emanuel, An American Musical Play
- The Black Nativity
- The Ballad of Trayvon Martin
- Othello: The Panther
- Salome Da Voodoo Princess of Nawlins
- Black Footnotes
- Brown Gyal in di RIng
- History of the Word
- Diss Diss and Diss Dat
- Exposures

=== Other plays ===
- The Cut
- When You Come for One of Us, You Come for All of Us a.k.a. This is America
- Sister in Selma
- Charlottesville
- Daisy
- Children of the Dream
- Straight Outta Denmark
- america has a problem
