= Yuriko Kimura =

Dancer

- Born: Kanzawa, Japan
- Occupation: Dancer
- Career
- Former groups: Martha Graham Dance Company

Yuriko Kimura (木村百合子) is a modern dancer, and was a primary dancer for the Martha Graham Dance Company from 1967 to 1985. Various dance critics, such as Anna Kisselgoff and Clive Barnes from the New York Times, who often reviewed Yuriko's performances, referred to her dancing as "incandescent", and to Kimura as one of the "most outstanding performers in modern dance today" and "a brilliant technician for whom no movement seems impossible". She was born in Kanzawa, Japan.

== Career ==
Kimura studied under Sachiko Kousaka. She started her career as a freelance dancer in both ballet and modern dance. During that time Kimura took part in the Tokyo Shimbun National Dance Competition and received the Dance Pen Club Award. She performed with the Modern Dance Association.

She studied with modern dance companies that came on tour from the United States. In 1964, Kimura attended an avant-garde workshop given by the Merce Cunningham Dance Company.

Several dancers received Fulbright Scholarships to teach in Japan. Eventually, Kimura followed in the footsteps of Kanda Akiko, and applied for and received a Fulbright Scholarship to study with the Martha Graham Dance Company in the United States. She arrived in 1966. Though she danced with a variety of companies during her early years in the US including -- Kazuo Hirabayashi, Mary Anthony, Donald McKayle, Sophie Maslow, and Lar Lubovitch, and sometimes in performances specifically featuring Japanese dancers—by 1968 Kimura joined the Martha Graham Dance Company and quickly became a principal dancer.

Some of her major works with the Martha Graham Company included Appalachian Spring, Embattled Garden, Errand into the Maze, Diversion of Angles, and Clytemnestra. She debuted in the title role of Clytemnestra in 1974, a role originally choreographed by Graham for herself. Over the years, Kimura reprised this role numerous times, to ever-greater critical response. Her performance as Clytemnestra was iconic enough that PBS broadcast the 1979 reprise as part of Great Performances' Dance in America series. The dance company rebroadcast that episode a number of times during the shutdown due to the COVID-19 pandemic. In 1978 she wowed audiences with Ecuatorial, in which Rudolf Nereyev debuted in the first of many co-leads with Kimura just two years later. The first time the Martha Graham Dance Company performed at The Metropolitan Opera in New York City, alongside Liza Minnelli, Kimura danced the eponymous pussycat in "The Owl and the Pussycat."

Due to the demanding form of the Graham technique, Kimura formed permanent injury and chronic pain over the course of her career. In 1988 she suffered from injury to her spine and had to leave the dance company and return to Japan.

Sources from the time frequently confuse Yuriko Kimura with US-born, long-time member of the Martha Graham Dance Company, Yuriko Amemiya Kikuchi, who often went by simply "Yuriko." Kiguchi was a star dancer with the company a full decade before Kimura joined, and so they were often referred to as "Big Yuriko" (Kiguchi) and "Little Yuriko" (Kimura).

=== Later career ===
In the late 1990s, Kimura was performing as a lead dancer with the New National Theater Contemporary Dance troupe. She pursued and received a Ph.D. She became a professor at Tenri University, in Nara, Japan, on the Faculty of Physical Education. She also taught the Graham Technique for Taipei National University of the Arts in Taiwan and the National Gugak Center in Seoul, South Korea.
