= Champeen =

Champeen was a 1983 musical by Melvin Van Peebles. It looked at the careers of Bessie Smith and Joe Louis, and had a cast of 18. It won 7 awards at the 11th Audelco Recognition Awards for black theater, including best actress, best choreography, and best director. Although it covered Bessie Smith's life, it was not a biographical play. The New York Times reviewed it positively, although it was stated that Miss Reaves-Phillips was not given enough singing time.
