= Laurence Holder =

American playwright, poet, and director

Laurence Holder is an American playwright, poet, and director who focuses on the African-American experience. His plays often center historical African-American figures including Malcolm X, Elijah Muhammad, Thelonious Monk, Duke Ellington, Billie Holiday, and Zora Neale Hurston. He is a 1998–1999 Otto Rene Castillo award recipient for political theatre. Holder's work has been performed at the Henry Street Settlement New Federal Theatre, the Ford Theatre, the American Place Theatre, and more. His work has been reviewed by The New York Times and the Washington Post among others. In addition to being a playwright, Holder taught English at John Jay College of Criminal Justice.

== Education ==
Holder attended the City College of New York from which he received a bachelor's degree in geology and creative writing.

== Plays ==
=== ZORA! ===
Performed to a sold out audience at the Penn Live Art: University of Pennsylvania Anneberg Theatre and sold out opening night at the American Theatre of Actors, Sargent Theater starring NY NAACP Winner Antonia Badon as ZORA! Directed by Greg Freelon, executive produced by Collector, Caroline Schimmel.

=== When the Chickens Come Home to Roost ===
Performed at the New Federal Theatre and featured Denzel Washington as Malcolm X and Kirk Kirksey as Elijah Muhammad.

=== Zora Neale Hurston ===
Off-Broadway play about the early 20th century writer starring Elizabeth Van Dyke and Tim Johnson and directed by Wynn Handiman. Shown at the American Place Theatre on West 46th Street in Manhattan.

=== Their Eyes Were Watching God ===
Off-Broadway play adapted from Zora Neale Hurston's novel Their Eyes Were Watching God; directed by Marishka S. Phillips and starring Lauren Marissa Smith. Held at the WOW Café Theatre in New York.

=== Monk ===
Off-Broadway one-man show starring Rome Neal as Thelonious Monk performed at the Nuyorican Poets Café. Directed by Holder and Neal. Assistant director, Jennifer Cummings. Lighting by Neal. Executive producer, Miguel Algarín. Production stage manager and sound by Triple-5 (William J. Vila). Jechibea Adu-Peasah on set design. This play has been reviewed by The New York Amsterdam News.

=== MonknBud ===
A play depicting the relationship between the American jazz musicians Thelonious Monk and Bud Powell.

== Awards ==
- 1998–1999 Otto Rene Castillo Award for Political Theatre
- Garland Anderson Award from the National Black Arts Festival
- New York Foundation Grant
- AUDELCO Best Writer Award for "M: The Mandela Saga"
- AUDELCO Award for drama Off and Off Off Broadway presented at CCNY's Aaron Davis Hall (1981) for "When the Chickens Come Home to Roost"
