= Mary Anthony =

American choreographer, modern dancer, and dance teacher

- Citizenship: United States

Mary Anthony (11 November 1916, in Newport, Kentucky – 31 May 2014, in Manhattan) was an American choreographer, modern dancer, and dance teacher. Both her work as a dancer and choreographer were highly influenced by Martha Graham and Hanya Holm.

== Life and career ==
Born and raised in Kentucky, Anthony studied theater at Grinnell College in Iowa before pursuing studies in dance at the Hanya Holm School in New York City. She later studied dance with Martha Graham. She also studied acting at HB Studio in Greenwich Village. From 1943 to 1949 she danced as a member of Hanya Holm's dance company. In 1949–50 she was a featured dancer in the Broadway musical Touch and Go, which was choreographed by Helen Tamiris. She danced in several productions with the New York City Opera during the 1950s and also choreographed several musicals in Italy during that decade.

In 1956 Anthony founded the Mary Anthony Dance Company. The company included two of her previous dance partners, Joseph Gifford and Cameron McCosh. The company presented Anthony's own choreography which frequently utilized literary sources as subjects. Her two most well known works were Lady Macbeth, after the Shakespeare play, and Threnody, based on John Millington Synge's play Riders to the Sea.

In 1946 Anthony began teaching at the New Dance Group where she taught for many years and her pupils included Ronald K. Brown, Ulysses Dove, Yuriko Kimura, Donald McKayle, Arthur Mitchell, Elisa Monte, and Richard Siegal. Yuriko Kimura also danced with her, on occasion.

In 1988, she was a guest modern dance teacher at the University of Illinois, Urbana-Champaign in the Department of Dance where she reconstructed Charles Weidman’s “Fables for our Times”, which was based on James Thurber’s Fables For Our Times and Famous Poems Illustrated.

== See also ==
- List of dancers
