= Charles Moore (dancer) =

American dancer, choreographer, and teacher

- Born: May 22, 1927; Cleveland, Ohio
- Died: January 23, 1986 (aged 58); Brooklyn, New York
- Occupations: Dancer; Choreographer
- Years active: 1948-1986
- Known for: The Charles Moore Dance Theatre

Charles Moore (May 22, 1928 – January 23, 1986) was an African-American dancer, choreographer, teacher and founder of The Charles Moore Dance Theatre in Brooklyn, New York.

== Early life and education ==
Charles Moore was born on May 22, 1928, in Cleveland, Ohio. As a child, he sang as a soprano soloist in churches as well as studying voice at the Karamu House, an arts center near his home that celebrated the African-American experience through the arts. At Severance Hall in Cleveland, Moore saw West African dancer and choreographer, Asadata Dafora, perform the Ostrich Dance. Inspired to begin studying dance himself, Moore later recalled that he would "never forget that first glimpse of Africa".

In 1948, Moore moved to New York City after receiving the Charles Weidman dance scholarship. It was there where he began studying ballet, modern and African dance from Charles Weidman, Asadata Dafora, Pearl Primus, and Katherine Dunham. Moore also studied with Nigerian dancers M. Olatunji and S. Ilori, as well as Ghanaian dancers Kobla Ladzekpo and A. Opoku. Between 1952 and 1960, Moore was a member of Katherine Dunham's dance company at the Dunham School of Dance and Theater.

== Career ==
In 1959, Moore began teaching Katherine Dunham's technique in New York City at the Clark Center for the Performing Arts, the New Dance Group Studio, and for Harlem Youth Activities (Har-You-Act), Hunter College, Medgar Evers College, City College, and the Hanson Place Methodist Church in Brooklyn.

In 1974 Moore founded the Charles Moore Center for Ethnic Studies and Dances and Drums of Africa. Through Dances and Drums of Africa, Moore revived one of Asadata Dafora's most famous pieces, "Awassa Astrige", calling it "The Ostrich", which would later become one of Moore's most celebrated pieces. Moore reconstructed many traditional African dances such as "Bundao", "Spear Dance", "Sacred Forest", and "African Congo".

Moore was featured in many dance companies apart from Dunham's such as the companies of Geoffrey Holder, Donald McKayle, Pearl Primus, Talley Beatty, Jean Leon Destiné and Alvin Ailey. He performed in many Broadway productions, including revivals of "Carmen Jones" and "House of Flowers", and was featured on television with Harry Belafonte, Sammy Davis Jr., and Lauren Bacall.

At the time of his death, Moore was working on "Traces: An American Suite", which was later completed by his wife Ella, with added choreography by Eleanor Harris and Pepsi Bethel. After his death, Louis Johnson created "Spirit, A Dance For Charles", to celebrate the life, work and devotion of Moore's to African and Caribbean music.

== The Charles Moore Dance Theatre ==
In 1974, Moore and his wife Ella founded the Charles Moore Center for Ethnic Studies in New York City. Moore used his company to reconstruct African dances that had once been considered lost by blending techniques of his teachers with his own. The Charles Moore Center for Ethnic Studies specialized in recreating African and Caribbean traditional dances and revivals of works by African choreographers. Through his company, Moore brought many African dancers and musicians to the United States to perform, including master drummer, Chief Bay. Between 1974 and 1985, Moore's company toured nationally and internationally.

Currently, the Charles Moore Dance Theatre is one of the oldest not-for-profit Blacks Arts Organization in Brooklyn.

== Personal life ==
Moore married Ella Thompson, also a dancer, in 1960 after meeting at the Dunham School of Dance and Theater. Together, they had one son, Anthony.

On January 23, 1986, Moore died in New York.
