= Mariam McGlone =

American dancer, dance critic, and educator (1916–2008)

Mariam McGlone (January 20, 1916 – May 19, 2008) was an American dancer, dance critic, and educator.

== Biography ==
Born January 20, 1916, in New York City, daughter of Russian emigrant parents Abraham and Bertha Gessler Siwek, Mariam McGlone trained in classical ballet, entered Barnard College for a semester but left to join The Humphrey Wideman Company, led by Doris Humphrey and Charles Wideman and subsequently became an early member of the Martha Graham company in Manhattan. During the years leading up to World War II, she worked in Hollywood performing in various films, among them Winged Victory, and training actors and dancers. During World War II she took a job in Chicago working for Variety magazine where she met her husband James McGlone Jr. a yacht racer and early Volkswagen dealer. They married in 1945, moved to New York where she established a studio in Manhasset on Long Island and for several decades, wrote dance criticism and launched what became a long-running lecture program in New York City, The Dance, Scene.

In 1983 she and her husband moved to Guilford where in addition to working for the Democratic Party, she served on the board of the Long Wharf Theatre, the Wightwood School and the Shoreline Alliance for the Arts in which she initiated numerous and diverse major dance programs. In 1998, with Pam Tatge of the Wesleyan University Center for the Arts, Mrs. McGlone became the artistic director of the Wesleyan Dance Master Classes which brought prominent and experimental choreographers from major and emerging dance companies to Wesleyan for an intensive weekend program which has now gained a national reputation. Wesleyan University gives out the Mariam McGlone emerging Choreographer Award every year in her honor.

McGlone died at her home in Guilford, Connecticut, where she had lived for twenty-five years.
