= Shirley Prendergast =

US theater lighting designer (1929–2019)

- Born: June 15, 1929; Boston, Massachusetts
- Died: February 26, 2019 (aged 89)
- Other name: Merris Shirley Prendergast
- Occupation: lighting designer

Merris Shirley Prendergast (June 15, 1929 – February 26, 2019) was a theater lighting designer notable for being the first African-American woman admitted to the United Scenic Artists’ lighting division in 1969. She was also the first African-American woman lighting designer on Broadway in 1973. Prendergast designed lighting for Broadway shows such as Waltz of the Stork, Amen Corner, and the Paul Robeson one-man show. She designed lighting for fifty years, well into her mid-80s. One of her last productions was Zora Neale Hurston: a Theatrical Biography in 2016.

== Early life ==
Prendergast was born in Boston, Massachusetts, to Dorita and Wilford Prendergast. She grew up in Boston and New York. She studied microbiology at Brooklyn College, where she received her Bachelor of Arts degree in 1954. She worked as a bacteriologist with the New York City Health Department and focused on her art when not at work. Prendergast took a lighting design class at the YWCA (Young Women's Christian Association) with Nicola Cernovich, a designer with Alvin Ailey's dance troupe. She then went on to study lighting at Lester Polakov's Studio of Stage Design.

One of her first jobs was as a lighting designer for the Negro Ensemble Company; one of their shows, The River Niger, went on to Broadway where she became established in her new career.

== Awards and honors ==
- AUDELCO Award for Lighting Design (1974)
- AUDELCO Award for Lighting Design for Unfinished Women... (1977)
- Obie Award for Sustained Excellence in Lighting Design (1997)
- Winona Lee Fletcher Award from the Black Theatre Network (1998)
- AUDELCO Award for Lighting Design for The Dance on Widow's Row (2000)
- AUDELCO Award for Lighting Design for Knock Me a Kiss (2011)
- United States Institute for Theatre Technology’s Distinguished Achievement Award in Lighting Design (2014)
