= Zooman and the Sign =

1980 play by Charles Fuller

Zooman and the Sign is an Obie Award-winning play by Charles Fuller. Set in Philadelphia in 1979, the play focuses on the murder of a 12-year-old African American girl in front of many local witnesses who refuse to reveal the killer despite the family's attempts for justice. It was first produced on December 7, 1980 Off-Broadway by the Negro Ensemble Company directed by Douglas Turner Ward and starring notable actors such as Giancarlo Esposito and Carol Lynn Maillard. The production earned Fuller an Obie Award for playwriting.

The play was revived at Second Stage Theater from November 22, 1994 to January 15, 1995 directed by Seret Scott. The cast included Larry Gilliard Jr. Stephen M. Henderson, Oni Faida Lampley, Saundra McCain and Tony Todd.

In 2009 the play was revived Off-Broadway by the Signature Theatre Company directed by Stephen McKinley Henderson featuring Amari Cheatom, Rosalyn Coleman, and Ron Canada. The text of the play is available through Samuel French.

In 1995, the play was adapted for television by Fuller himself, with Khalil Kain in the title role.
