= Chuck Cooper (actor) =

American actor (born 1954)

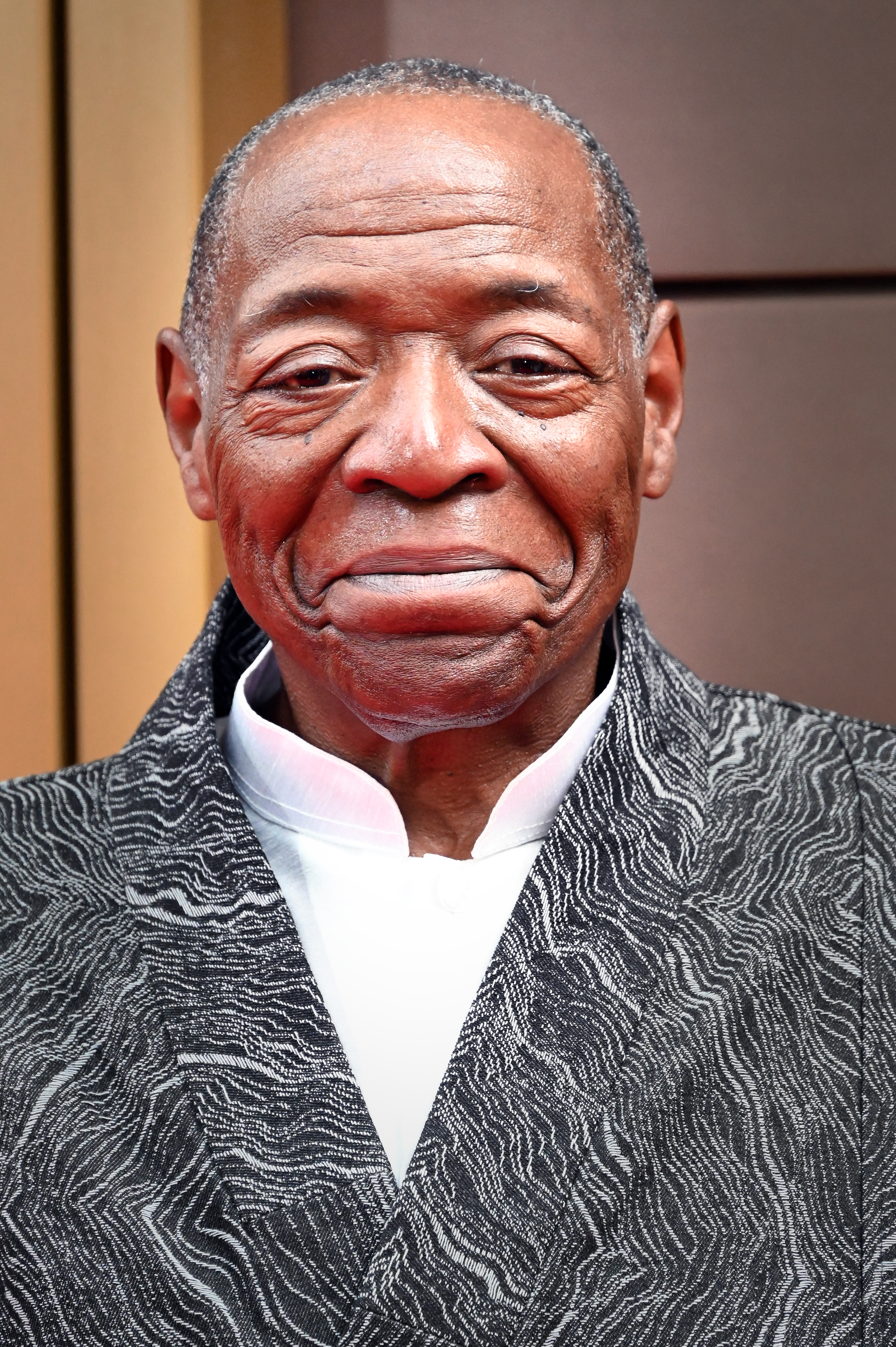
- Cooper in 2026
- Born: November 8, 1954 (age 71); Cleveland, Ohio, U.S.
- Occupation: Actor
- Years active: 1982–present
- Spouse: Deborah Brevoort (m. 2009)
- Children: 3, including Lilli Cooper
- Awards: Tony Award (1997), Antonyo Lifetime Achievement Award (2020)
- Website: chuckcooper.net

Chuck Cooper (born November 8, 1954) is an American actor. He won the 1997 Tony Award for Best Performance by a Featured Actor in a Musical for his performance as the pimp Memphis in The Life.

== Career ==
Cooper made his Broadway debut in 1983 in the musical Amen Corner, playing the role of Brother Boxer. He was an understudy in the original Broadway casts of his next three shows: Someone Who'll Watch Over Me (he eventually took over the role of Adam), Passion, and Getting Away with Murder.

Cooper won the Tony Award for Best Performance by a Featured Actor in a Musical for his performance as the pimp Memphis in the 1997 Broadway production of the musical The Life.

Cooper has also appeared in Chicago as Billy Flynn, Caroline, or Change in the dual role of The Bus and The Dryer, and Finian's Rainbow as Bill Rawkins, as well as benefit performances of Hair and A Wonderful Life. In February 2010 he was the narrator in the U.S. premiere of Seven Scenes from Hamlet, by the Spanish composer Benet Casablancas, at the Miller Theatre in Manhattan.

In 2015, Cooper appeared on Broadway as the slave Thomas in the new musical Amazing Grace, at the Nederlander Theatre. The musical is about John Newton, the redeemed slave-trader who wrote the hymn "Amazing Grace". In 2021, he returned for the Broadway debut production of Alice Childress's 1955 play Trouble in Mind, at Roundabout Theatre Company's American Airlines Theatre. For this performance, he has been nominated for the Tony Award for Best Featured Actor in a Play.

== Personal life ==
Cooper has three children—Eddie, Alex, and Lilli—from his first marriage. His son Eddie and daughter Lilli are also actors and have performed on television and on stage. In May 2009, Cooper and playwright Deborah Brevoort were married in Carmel, New York, after almost ten years of dating. Their initial meeting and eventual engagement were covered in a New York Times website video.

== Stage credits ==
| Year | Title | Role | Location | Notes |
|---|---|---|---|---|
| 1982 | Colored People's Time | Bert / Abner / Blind John / Isaac | Cherry Lane Theatre | Off-Broadway |
| 1983 | Amen Corner | Brother Boxer | Nederlander Theatre | Broadway |
| 1985-1986 | The Tap Dance Kid | William | —N/a | US National Tour |
| 1988-1989 | Rumors | Welch | Broadhurst Theatre | Broadway |
| 1989-1990 | Rumors | Welch | Ethel Barrymore Theatre | Broadway |
| 1991 | Four Short Operas, Break | Man 1 / Man in Dirty Dungeons / Cabbie / Man | Playwrights Horizons | Off-Broadway |
| 1993 | Someone Who'll Watch Over Me | Adam | Booth Theatre | Broadway |
| 1994-1995 | Passion | u/s Private Augenti / u/s Fosca's Father / u/s Lieutenant Barri / u/s Major Rizzolli / u/s Lieutenant Torasso | Plymouth Theatre | Broadway |
| 1995 | Police Boys | Capt. Jabali Abdul LaRouche | Playwrights Horizons | Off-Broadway |
| 1996-1997 | Whistle Down the Wind | Ed / Ensemble | National Theatre | Washington, D.C. |
| 1997-1998 | The Life | Memphis | Ethel Barrymore Theatre | Broadway |
| 1999 | Caroline, or Change | Dryer / Bus | The Public Theater | Off-Broadway |
| 2001 | Chicago | Billy Flynn | Shubert Theatre | Broadway |
| 2003-2004 | Caroline, or Change | Dryer / Bus | The Public Theater | Off-Broadway |
| 2004 | Caroline, or Change | Dryer / Bus | Eugene O'Neill Theatre | Broadway |
| 2005 | A Wonderful Life | Uncle Billy | Shubert Theatre | Broadway Concert |
| 2007 | Two Trains Running | Memphis | Old Globe Theatre | Regional |
| 2008 | Hamlet | Polonius | Shakespeare Theatre Company | Regional |
| 2009-2010 | Finian's Rainbow | Bill Rawkins | St. James Theatre | Broadway |
| 2011 | Lost in the Stars | Stephen Kumalo | New York City Center | Off-Broadway; Encores! |
| 2013 | The Piano Lesson | Wining Boy | Signature Theatre Company | Regional |
| 2013 | Choir Boy | Headmaster Marrow | New York City Center | Off-Broadway |
| 2013 | Romeo and Juliet | Capulet | Richard Rodgers Theatre | Broadway |
| 2014 | Act One | Wally / Charles Gilpin / Max Siegel / Langston Hughes | Vivian Beaumont Theatre | Broadway |
| 2014 | Amazing Grace | Thomas / Paketuh | Bank of America Theatre | Regional |
| 2015 | Amazing Grace | Thomas / Keita | Nederlander Theatre | Broadway |
| 2016 | West Side Story | Doc / Krupke | Carnegie Hall | Concert |
| 2016 | The Cherry Orchard | Pischik | American Airlines Theatre | Broadway |
| 2017 | Prince of Broadway | Performer | Samuel J. Friedman Theatre | Broadway |
| 2018 | Me and My Girl | Sir John Tremayne | New York City Center | Off-Broadway; Encores! |
| 2018-2019 | Choir Boy | Headmaster Marrow | Samuel J. Friedman Theatre | Broadway |
| 2019 | Much Ado About Nothing | Leonato | The Public Theater | Off-Broadway |
| 2019 | Road Show | Papa Mizner | New York City Center | Off-Broadway; Encores! |
| 2019 | Let 'Em Eat Cake | Matthew Fulton | Carnegie Hall | Concert |
| 2020 | Joseph and the Amazing Technicolor Dreamcoat | Jacob | David Geffen Hall | 50th Anniversary Concert |
| 2021-2022 | Trouble in Mind | Sheldon Forrester | American Airlines Theatre | Broadway |
| 2023 | The Frogs | Charon | Lincoln Center | Concert |
| 2024 | Titanic | Captain Edward John Smith | New York City Center | Off-Broadway; Encores! |
| 2024 | Two Gentlemen of Verona | Duke of Milan | Symphony Space | Concert |
| 2026 | The Winter's Tale | Old Shepherd | Delacorte Theatre | Shakespeare in the Park |
