= Glenda Dickerson =

American theatre director (1945–2012)

- Born: February 9, 1945; Houston, Texas
- Died: January 12, 2012 (aged 66); Ypsilanti, Michigan
- Education: Howard University (BFA); Adelphi University (MA)
- Occupations: Director, folklorist, writer, educator

Glenda Dickerson (February 9, 1945 – January 12, 2012) was an American director, folklorist, adaptor, writer, choreographer, actor, black theatre organizer, and educator. She was the second African-American woman to direct on Broadway, with her 1980 musical production of Reggae: a musical revelation. She is known throughout the American Theater as a promoter of a "womanist" direction in the theater and her work focused on folklore, myths, black legends, and classical works reinterpreted. She worked in venues including the Biltmore Theatre (Broadway), Circle in the Square (New York City), The Lorraine Hansberry Theatre (San Francisco), Ford's Theatre and the Kennedy Center (Washington, D.C.). In 1971, Dickerson received an Emmy nomination and in 1972 a Peabody Award.

She conceived and/or adapted numerous vehicles for the stage from various dramatic and non-dramatic sources, including the "miracle play" Jesus Christ, Lawd Today; Owen's Song; The Unfinished Song; Rashomon; Torture of Mothers; Jump at the Sun; Re/Membering Aunt Jemima: A Menstrual Show and Every Step I Take. She conceived and directed Eel Catching in Setauket: A Living Portrait of a Community, an oral history, creative performance project which documented the lives of the African-American Christian Avenue community in Setauket, Long Island. She performed in her one-woman shows, Saffron Persephone Brown, The Flower-storm of a Brown Woman; Spreading Lies, and in The Trojan Women: A Tale of Devastation for Two Voices.

She wrote African American Theater: A Cultural Companion, and completed a two-disk DVD, What's Cookin' in the Kitchen? A Planetary Portrait 9/11/01 - 9/11/04, which documented her "Kitchen Prayers" series. At the University of Michigan, she was Head of the African American Theater Minor and served as Director of the Center for World Performance Studies. Before Michigan, She was head of the Department of Drama and Dance at Spelman College and she taught at Rutgers University, both the New Brunswick and Newark campuses. Dickerson was also an Assistant Professor of Directing in the Department of Theater at Howard University and Chair of the Theater Department at The Duke Ellington School of the Arts (formerly, The School of the Arts at Western). She was the playwright with Breena Clarke of Re/Membering Aunt Jemima: A Menstrual Show, which is published in Colored Contradictions, An Anthology of Contemporary African-American Plays edited by Harry J. Elam and Robert Alexander and in Contemporary Plays by Women of Color, An Anthology, edited by Kathy Perkins and Roberta Uno.

Dickerson held the distinction, along with Vinnette Carroll, of being one of the few African-American women to have directed on Broadway and she directed such actors as Debbie Allen, Lynn Whitfield, Charles Brown, Philip Michael Thomas, Robert Townsend, Clifton Powell, and many others.

== Awards, honors, and recognition ==
Ms. Glenda Dickerson received the inaugural Shirley Verrett Award in November 2011, which was established to honor the legacy of the late internationally acclaimed opera singer Shirley Verrett, who was also the James Earl Jones Distinguished University Professor of Voice at the University of Michigan's School of Music, Theatre, and Dance. The award celebrates Dickerson's dedication to promoting the success of women of color students and faculty in the creative arts and for her commitment to diversity as part of the University's mission.

== Death ==
Dickerson died in Ypsilanti, Michigan, aged 66, on January 12, 2012. She was survived by her daughter, Anitra Y. Dickerson Duncan, and extended family.

== Directing credits ==
- Black Medea (1978)
- Bones (1979)
- Glorious Monster in the Bell of the Horn (1979)
- Reggae (1980)
- No (1980)
- The Tale of Madame Zora (1986)
