= Kirsten Childs =

American playwright

- Born: Kirsten J. Childs; Los Angeles, California, U.S.
- Occupations: Playwright, librettist
- Relatives: Billy Childs (brother)
- Writing career
- Notable works: The Bubbly Black Girl Sheds Her Chameleon Skin; Bella: An American Tall Tale

Kirsten J. Childs is an American playwright, librettist, and former actress.

== Early life and performing career ==
Childs was born in Los Angeles, California. Her parents were schoolteachers. Her younger brother is the jazz musician Billy Childs. She began her theatrical career in the late 1970s as a Broadway performer. In 1977, Bob Fosse cast her in the lead role of Velma Kelly in the first national tour of the musical Chicago. She went on to appear in productions of Dancin', Jerry's Girls, and Sweet Charity in the 1980s. Primarily a stage actress, her one major film role was the 1989 comedy See No Evil, Hear No Evil, in which she played Adele, the long-suffering sister of Richard Pryor's character.

== Later writing career ==
Childs subsequently turned to writing her own theatrical productions, beginning with the semi-autobiographical work The Bubbly Black Girl Sheds Her Chameleon Skin (2000), an off-Broadway musical that received an Obie Award. Her other musicals include Miracle Brothers (2005), Funked Up Fairy Tales (2007), and Bella: An American Tall Tale (2016), a winner of the Weston Playhouse New Musical Award.

Childs has also served as an assistant professor in New York University Tisch School of the Arts' Graduate Musical Theatre Writing program.
