= Choir Boy =

Play by American playwright Tarell Alvin McCraney

- Written by: Tarell Alvin McCraney
- Characters: Pharus Jonathan Young; Headmaster Marrow; Junior Davis; David Heard; Bobby Marrow; Anthony Justin ‘AJ’ James; Mr. Pendleton
- Original language: English
- Genre: Drama
- Setting: Charles R. Drew Prep School

Premiere
- Date premiered: September 4, 2012
- Place premiered: Royal Court Theatre; London, England
- https://choirboybroadway.com/

Choir Boy is a coming-of-age play by American playwright Tarell Alvin McCraney. The play premiered in September 2012 at the Royal Court Theatre, London, before going on to play productions at New York City Center, Alliance Theatre, Geffen Playhouse, and many more regional theaters across the United States. The show opened on Broadway at the Samuel J. Friedman Theatre on January 8, 2019, after entering previews on December 12, 2018.

== Main characters ==
Pharus Jonathan Young – teen male of color, junior at Charles R. Drew Prep School for Boys. Choir lead at the start of the play. Unclear sexuality. Has been rooming with Anthony Justin ‘AJ’ James since Sophomore year.

Headmaster Marrow – Man of color in his thirties or forties. New to being a headmaster at the school. The uncle of Bobby Marrow.

Junior Davis - teen male of color, junior at the school and a part of the boys choir. He is a school legacy, but at the school on scholarship.

David Heard - teen male of color, senior at the school and a member of the boys choir. Has aspirations to become a minister. Deeply religious.

Bobby Marrow – teen male of color. Junior at the school and a part of the boys choir. Nephew to Headmaster Narrow and a school legacy.

Anthony Justin ‘AJ’ James – teen male of color. Senior at the school. Roommates with Pharus.

Mr. Pendleton - white male professor. Has been teaching at the school for a long time.

== Plot summary ==
The play begins at the graduation ceremony at the Charles R. Drew Prep School for Boys. As Pharus sings a song for the ceremony, Bobby calls him racial and homophobic slurs, causing Pharus to freeze. Later, Headmaster Stephen Marrow scolds Pharus for freezing, but Pharus refuses to snitch on his peers. Summer passes.

On the first day of class, Bobby and Jr serve their punishment for disturbing the ceremony. Bobby accuses Pharus of snitching, but he denies it. This culminates in Pharus kicking Bobby out of choir. Pharus, Jr, David, and AJ continue to sing together. Months later, Headmaster Marrow threatens to remove Pharus as the choir lead for not being able to get along with its members. Pharus says that he will appeal to the board and lightly accuses him of making that choice because he is queer. Headmaster Marrow takes back the threat and allows Pharus to continue as lead. Pharus and Bobby bicker in Mr. Pendleton’s class, leading Bobby to leave class. In the shower room, AJ calls Pharus out for singing loudly. In retaliation, Pharus begins talking about AJ’s penis size. AJ also calls Pharus out for using neutral pronouns when describing who AJ might have sex with. David enters and informs the two that he overheard their conversation, but Pharus explains that they were just joking. Later, inside Pharus and AJ’s dorm room, they begin jokingly arguing. They begin play-fighting, tackling, and tickling, and Pharus becomes aroused and pushes AJ off him. AJ realizes what has happened.

During a call home to Pharus’ mom, he tells her that he will not be singing at Commencement, but he hopes that she will continue to be proud of him. Later in the shower room, Pharus enters and starts talking to someone, but they remain unseen to the audience. Pharus tells the person that he misses him. Jr. reenters, and the audience hears the sound of Pharus getting punched. Afterwards, the Headmaster starts to question people about the incident. Pharus insists that he fell and repeats that he is “a Drew man”. AJ and David both deny hitting Pharus, but David is suspended and his scholarship is taken away, causing him to no longer be able to attend the school. When the headmaster and Mr. Pendleton discuss the school, the headmaster says that he never expected to deal with queer issues. The teachers then explain how Pharus cannot sing during commencement because “boys with black eyes” are not allowed to represent the school.

The day before commencement, Pharus wakes AJ up with his practicing in hopes that the headmaster will change his mind. AJ cuts Pharus’ hair and tells him the story of the last time he went to the barbershop, where he was called a homophobic slur. After, AJ lets Pharus sleep beside him. In the final scene of the play, Bobby sings the commencement music. Bobby pauses at the same moment where Pharus did at the beginning of the play, turns around to look at him, and then continues the song.

== Production history ==
=== London (2012) ===
Choir Boy opened at the Royal Court Theatre on September 4, 2012, and it played until October 6. Dominic Cooke directed and the cast featured: Dominic Smith (Pharus), David Burke (Mr Pendleton), Gary McDonald (Headmaster Marrow), Eric Kofi-Abrefa (Bobby), Kwayedza Kureya (Junior Davis), Khali Best (Anthony Justin), and Aron Julius (David Heard).

=== Off-Broadway (2013) ===
Choir Boy was commissioned by Manhattan Theater Club. The production began previews on June 18, 2013, with an official opening on July 2, 2013. The production starred Jeremy Pope as Pharus Jonathan Young, Nicholas L. Ashe as Junior Davis, Kyle Beltran as David Heard, Grantham Coleman as Anthony Justin 'AJ' James, Chuck Cooper as Headmaster Marrow, Austin Pendleton as Mr. Pendleton, and Wallace Smith as Bobby Marrow. The show closed on August 11, 2013.

=== Atlanta (2013) ===
Choir Boy premiered on the Hertz Stage at Alliance Theatre on September 20, 2013, and closed on October 13, 2013.

The show featured Jeremy Pope as Pharus Jonathan Young and Nicholas L. Ashe as Junior Davis, both reprising their performances from the City Center run of the show. New cast members included Caleb Eberhardt as David Heard, Joshua Boone as Bobby Marrow, Scott Robertson as Mr. Pendleton, John Stewart as Anthony Justin 'AJ' James, and Charles E. Wallace as Headmaster Marrow. Serving as the production understudies were Victor Jackson for Pharus Jonathan Young and Junior Davis; Patrick McColery for Mr. Pendleton; Kevin O'Hara for Headmaster Marrow; and Alex B. West for Anthony Justin 'AJ' James, David Heard, and Bobby Marrow.

The production was directed by Trip Cullman, and featured set and costume design by David Zinn, lighting design by Peter Kaczorowski, sound design by Fitz Patton, music direction and vocal arrangements by Jason Michael Webb, and casting by Nancy Piccione, Kelly Gillespie, and Jody Feldman.

=== Los Angeles (2014) ===
The Geffen Playhouse production in Los Angeles, California began previews on September 16, 2014, before the official opening night on September 26, 2014, and a final performance on October 26, 2014. This production marked the show's West Coast premiere.

The cast included Jeremy Pope as Pharus Jonathan Young, Nicholas L. Ashe as Junior Davis, and Grantham Coleman as Anthony Justin 'AJ' James, all reprising their performances from New York City Center Stage I, and Caleb Eberhardt as David Heard, reprising his performance from the Alliance Theatre production. New to the company was Michael A. Shepperd as Headmaster Marrow, Donovan Mitchell as Bobby Marrow, and Leonard Kelly-Young as Mr. Pendleton.

The production was directed by Trip Cullman and featured set design by David Zinn, costume design by E.B. Brooks, lighting design by Peter Kaczorowski, sound design by Fitz Patton, music direction and vocal arrangements by Jason Michael Webb, and casting by Phyllis Schuringa.

=== Broadway (2018) ===
Choir Boy began previews on Broadway at the Samuel J. Friedman Theatre on December 12, 2018, officially opening on January 8, 2019, and closing on March 10, directed by Trip Cullman and with music direction and arrangements by Jason Michael Webb. The show features choreography by Camille A. Brown, scenic design and costume design by David Zinn, sound design by Fitz Patton, production stage manager Narda E. Alcorn, lighting design by Peter Kaczorowski. Jeremy Pope, Chuck Cooper, Caleb Eberhardt, Nicholas L. Ashe and Austin Pendleton reprised their roles.

The production was praised by critics, especially appreciating Jason Michael Webb's book, Brown's choreography and sound design by Patton. It received four nominations at the 73rd Tony Awards, including for Best Play, winning for Best Sound Design of a Play and a Special Tony Award for Webb.

=== Toronto ===
Choir Boy, co-produced by Canadian Stage and The Arts Club, opened on Friday November 11, 2022, at the Bluma Appel Theatre in the St. Lawrence Centre for the Arts. Directed by Mike Payette, it starred Andrew Broderick, Kwaku Okyere, David Andrew Reid, Clarence "CJ" Jura, Savion Roach, Daren Herbert and Scott Bellis.

=== Bristol (2023) ===
A UK revival of the play was done at the Bristol Old Vic in 2023. The production was directed by artistic director Nancy Medina and starred Terique Jarrett as Pharus, along with Daon Broni, Michael Ahomka-Lindsay, Alistair Nwachukwu, Jyuddah James, Khalid Daley, and Martin Turner. The production ran from 12 October 2023 to 11 November 2023.

=== London revival (2026) ===
The Bristol production transferred to London's Theatre Royal Stratford East as part of its new artistic director, Lisa Spirling's inaugural season. Most of the Bristol cast reprised their roles, along with the same creative team led by director Nancy Medina. The production began performances on 26 March 2026 and is scheduled to run through 25 April.

== Cast and characters ==
Character	London	Off-Broadway	Atlanta	Los Angeles	Broadway	Bristol	London Revival
Character	2012	2013		2014	2018	2023	2026
Pharus Jonathan Young	Dominic Smith	Jeremy Pope	Jeremy Pope	Jeremy Pope	Jeremy Pope	Terique Jarrett	Terique Jarrett
Headmaster Marrow	Gary McDonald	Chuck Cooper	Charles E. Wallace	Michael A. Shepperd	Chuck Cooper	Daon Broni	Daon Broni
David Heard	Aron Julius	Kyle Beltran	Caleb Eberhardt	Caleb Eberhardt	Caleb Eberhardt	Michael Ahomka-Lindsay	Michael Ahomka-Lindsay
Bobby Marrow	Eric Kofi-Abrefa	Wallace Smith	Joshua Boone	Donovan Mitchell	J. Quinton Johnson	Alistair Nwachukwu	Rabi Kondé
Anthony Justin 'AJ' James	Khali Best	Grantham Coleman	John Stewart	Grantham Coleman	John Clay III	Jyuddah James	Freddie MacBruce
Junior Davis	Kwayedza Kureya	Nicholas L. Ashe	Nicholas L. Ashe	Nicholas L. Ashe	Nicholas L. Ashe	Khalid Daley	Khalid Daley
Mr. Pendleton	David Burke	Austin Pendleton	Scott Robertson	Leonard Kelly-Young	Austin Pendleton	Martin Turner	Martin Turner

== Awards and nominations ==
=== Original Off-Broadway production ===
Year	Award	Category	Nominee	Result
2013	Drama League Award	Distinguished Performance	Jeremy Pope	Nominated
2013	Outer Critics Circle Award	Outstanding New Off-Broadway Play		Nominated

=== Broadway production ===
Year	Award	Category	Nominee	Result
2019	Tony Awards	Best Play		Nominated
2019	Tony Awards	Best Performance by an Actor in a Leading Role in a Play	Jeremy Pope	Nominated
2019	Tony Awards	Best Sound Design of a Play	Fitz Patton	Won
2019	Tony Awards	Best Choreography	Camille A. Brown	Nominated
2019	Tony Awards	Special Tony Award	Jason Michael Webb	Won
2019	Drama Desk Award	Outstanding Music in a Play	Jason Michael Webb and Fitz Patton	Won
2019	Drama Desk Award	Outstanding Sound Design in a Play	Fitz Patton	Nominated
2019	Drama Desk Award	Outstanding Choreography	Camille A. Brown	Nominated
2019	Outer Critics Circle Award	Outstanding Actor in a Play	Jeremy Pope	Nominated
2019	Outer Critics Circle Award	Outstanding Featured Actor in a Play	John Clay III	Nominated
2020	GLAAD Media Award	Outstanding Broadway Production		Nominated
