= Charles Fuller =

American dramatist (1939–2022)

- Born: March 5, 1939; Philadelphia, Pennsylvania, U.S.
- Died: October 3, 2022 (aged 83); Toronto, Ontario, Canada
- Education: Villanova University; La Salle University
- Spouses: Miriam Nesbitt (m. 1962; died 2006) Claire Prieto (m. 2008)
- Children: 2

Charles H. Fuller Jr. (March 5, 1939 – October 3, 2022) was an American playwright, best known for his play A Soldier's Play, for which he received the 1982 Pulitzer Prize for Drama and the 2020 Tony Award for Best Revival of a Play.

== Early life ==
Fuller was born in Philadelphia, Pennsylvania, on March 5, 1939, the son of Charles H. Fuller Sr. and Lillian Anderson. Raised Roman Catholic, he attended Roman Catholic High School and then Villanova University (1956–1958), then joined the U.S. Army in 1959, serving in Japan and South Korea. He left the military in 1962, and later studied at La Salle University (1965–1967), earning a DFA. Furthermore, he co-founded the Afro-American Arts Theatre in Philadelphia.

== Career ==
Fuller vowed to become a writer after noticing that his high school's library had no books by African-American authors. He achieved critical notice in 1969 with The Village: A Party, a drama about racial tensions between a group of mixed-race couples. He later wrote plays for the Henry Street Settlement theatre and the Negro Ensemble Company in New York City, which have performed several of his plays. His 1975 play, The Brownsville Raid, is based on the Brownsville affair, an altercation between black soldiers and white civilians in Brownsville, Texas, in 1906, which led to an entire black regiment being dishonorably discharged, though later pardoned in 1976.

Fuller won an Obie Award for Zooman and the Sign in 1980, about a black Philadelphia teen who kills a young girl on her own front porch, and whose neighbors eventually rise up against him after being goaded out of their apathy by the girl's father with a sign. Zooman presents himself as a helpless product of his society, but his victim's father convinces their neighbors that they need to stand together and achieve justice.

Fuller's next work, A Soldier's Play, told the story of the racially charged search by a black captain for the murderer of a black sergeant on a Louisiana army base in 1944, as a means to discuss the position of blacks in white society. Although the play enjoyed a long run, Fuller said it never played on Broadway because he refused to drop the last line, "You'll have to get used to black people being in charge." It was nevertheless a critical success, winning Fuller a Pulitzer Prize in 1982, and being produced as the 1984 film A Soldier's Story, for which Fuller himself wrote the screen adaptation. His screenplay was nominated for an Academy Award, a Golden Globe Award, and a Writers Guild Award of America, and it won an Edgar Award.

After this play, Fuller switched his focus to movies for several years, saying "I always wanted to reach the most people with my work. Not enough people go to the theater." He subsequently penned other works for the stage, but they were not critically acclaimed.

In January 2020, A Soldier's Play finally debuted on Broadway in a production by the Roundabout Theatre Company, starring David Alan Grier and Blair Underwood and directed by Kenny Leon. It ran for 58 performances, closing on March 11, 2020, when Broadway theaters were closed due to the COVID-19 pandemic. The production was declared eligible for a Tony Award for Best Revival of a Play at the 74th Tony Awards despite never having been performed on Broadway before. The Tony nominating committee had deemed A Soldier's Play a classic, but in their ruling, the committee also decided that due to this being the play's first Broadway production, Fuller would be included in the production's nomination as if the play were nominated for a Tony Award for Best Play. As such, Fuller won a Tony Award for A Soldier's Play nearly 40 years after its first production.

Of his methods for advancing the African-American cause, Fuller said in a 1982 interview, "My argument is on the stage. I don't have to be angry. O.K.? I get it all out right up there. There's no reason to carry this down from the stage and into the seats. And it does not mean that I am not enraged at injustice or prejudice or bigotry. It simply means that I cannot be enraged all the time. To spend one's life being angry, and in the process doing nothing to change it, is to me ridiculous. I could be mad all day long, but if I'm not doing a damn thing, what difference does it make?"

Fuller received grants from the Rockefeller Foundation, Guggenheim Foundation, the State of New York, and the National Endowment for the Arts. He also wrote short fiction and screenplays and worked as a movie producer. In 2010, he published his first novel, Snatch: The Adventures of David and Me, a work of children's fiction written for his two sons. He was a member of the Writers Guild of America, East.

== Personal life ==
He died of natural causes in Toronto at the age of 83. He left behind his second wife, Claire Prieto, his son, David Ira Fuller, his step-son, Ian Kamau, his two daughters-in-law, Cathy Fuller and Robin Meadows-Fuller, four grandchildren and three great-grandchildren.

== Bibliography ==
=== Plays ===
- The Village: A Party (also known as The Perfect Party), 1968
- An Untitled Play, 1970
- In My Many Names and Days, 1972
- The Candidate, 1974.
- In the Deepest Part of Sleep, 1974
- First Love (one-act), 1974.
- The Lay out Letter (one-act), 1975
- The Brownsville Raid, 1976
- Zooman and the Sign, 1982.
- A Soldier's Play, 1982
- We, 1988
- Eliot’s Coming, 1988

=== Novels ===
- Snatch: The Adventures of David and Me, 2010.
