= A Soldier's Play =

Play written by Charles Fuller

- Original language: English
- Written by: Charles Fuller
- Characters: Capt. Davenport; Sgt. Waters; Pvt. Wilkie; Cpl. Cobb; Pvt. Smalls; Capt. Taylor; C.J. Memphis; Cpl. Ellis; Pfc. Peterson; Pvt. Henson; Big Mary; Lt. Byrd; Capt. Wilcox; Sgt. Washington; Col. Nivens
- Subject: Racism, military life, police procedural
- Genre: Mystery; drama
- Setting: Fort Neal, Louisiana, in 1944

Premiere
- Date: November 20, 1981
- Place: Negro Ensemble Company at Theatre Four, 424 W 55th Street; New York City, New York

A Soldier's Play is a play by American playwright Charles Fuller. Set on a US Army installation in the segregation-era South, the play is a loose adaptation of Herman Melville's novella Billy Budd, and follows the murder investigation of the Sergeant in an all-black unit. The play uses a murder mystery to explore the complicated feelings of anger and resentment that some African Americans have toward one another, and the ways in which many black Americans have absorbed white racist attitudes.

The drama won the 1982 Pulitzer Prize for Drama, among other accolades. It was the basis for a 1984 feature film adaptation, A Soldier's Story, for which Fuller wrote the screenplay.

== Plot synopsis ==
In 1944 at the United States Army's Fort Neal in Louisiana, a light-skinned black man Sergeant Vernon Waters is murdered by an unseen shooter. Just before his death, Waters utters the enigmatic cry, "They still hate you!"

Captain Richard Davenport is a black Army officer; a rarity. He arrives to investigate the killing. Initially, the primary suspects are local Ku Klux Klansmen. Later, bigoted white soldiers fall under suspicion. Ultimately, Davenport discovers the killer was one of the black soldiers under Waters' command. Waters' men hated him because Waters himself treated Southern black men with disdain and contempt.

As Davenport interviews witnesses and suspects, flashbacks show what Sergeant Waters was like, and how he treated his men. The light-skinned Waters was highly intelligent and extremely ambitious. He loathed black men who conformed to old-fashioned racist stereotypes. Waters dreamed of sending his own children to an elite college where they would associate with white students, rather than with other blacks. In Waters' mind, Uncle Toms and "lazy, shiftless Negroes" reflected poorly on him, and made it harder for other African-Americans to succeed. For that reason, Waters persecuted black soldiers like Private C.J. Memphis, whose broad grin and jive talk infuriated Waters. Waters' cruelty and vindictiveness drove Memphis to suicide, which alienated the rest of Waters' men and turned them against him.

Shortly before he was murdered, Waters came to realize how futile and foolish his lifelong attempts to behave like a white man had been. His dying words, "They still hate you," reflected his belated understanding that white hatred and disdain of black men like himself had nothing to do with stereotypical black behavior, and that whites would probably always hate him, no matter how hard he tried to emulate "white" ways.

== Productions ==
The play originally was staged Off-Broadway by the Negro Ensemble Company at Theater Four (now called the Julia Miles Theater). It opened on November 20, 1981, and closed on January 2, 1983, after 468 performances. The original cast included Adolph Caesar as Sergeant Waters, Denzel Washington as Private Peterson, Larry Riley as Private C.J. Memphis, Samuel L. Jackson as Private Louis Henson, Peter Friedman as Captain Charles Taylor, and Charles Brown as Captain Davenport. The director was Douglas Turner Ward. In addition to the Pulitzer Prize, the play won the Outer Critics Circle Award for Best Off-Broadway Play, the New York Drama Critics' Circle Award for Best American Play, and the Obie Award for Distinguished Ensemble Performance.

The Valiant Theatre Company presented the play Off-Broadway at Theatre Four from November 19, 1996, to December 8. Directed by Clinton Turner Davis, the cast featured Wood Harris (Private First Class Melvin Peterson), Keith Randolph Smith, Danny Johnson (C.J. Memphis), Geoffrey C. Ewing (Captain Richard Davidson), Jonathan Walker and Albert Hall (Sergeant Waters).

The play was revived Off-Broadway by Second Stage Theatre from September 20, 2005 (previews), opening on October 17, 2005, and closing on November 27, 2005. Directed by Jo Bonney, the cast featured James McDaniel as Tech. Sergeant Vernon C. Waters, Anthony Mackie as Private First Class Melvin Peterson, Mike Colter as Private C.J. Memphis, Dorian Missick as Private Louis Henson, Steven Pasquale as Captain Charles Taylor, and Taye Diggs as Captain Richard Davenport.

Roundabout Theater Company presented the play's Broadway debut in January 2020, starring David Alan Grier as Sergeant Waters, Blair Underwood as Captain Davenport, and Nnamdi Asomugha as Private First Class Melvin Peterson; directed by Kenny Leon. As of March 8, 2020, the production had completed 55 performances. On March 11, 2020, all Broadway theaters closed due to the COVID-19 pandemic, suspending the play's run. Despite its shortened run, the production won multiple accolades, including the Tony Award for Best Revival of a Play, the Drama Desk Award for Outstanding Revival of a Play, the Drama League Award for Outstanding Revival of a Play, and the Outer Critics Circle Award for Outstanding Revival of a Play. The play embarked on a national tour during the 2022–2023 season, starring Norm Lewis as Davenport and Eugene Lee as Waters.

== Film adaptation ==
Caesar, Washington and Larry Riley reprised their roles in the film version, A Soldier's Story, directed by Norman Jewison.

== Television adaptation ==
In September 2021, it was reported that Sony Pictures Television planned to adapt the play into a limited television series titled A Soldier's Story. Grier was to reprise his role as Waters and also serve as executive producer on the series.

== Awards and nominations ==
=== Original Off-Broadway Production (1981) ===
Year	Award	Category	Nominee	Result
1982	Clarence Derwent Awards	Most Promising Male	Larry Riley	Won
1982	Drama League Awards	Outstanding Featured Actor in a Play	Adolph Caesar	Won
1982	Outer Critics Circle Awards	Outstanding New Off-Broadway Play		Won
1982	New York Drama Critics' Circle	Best American Play	Charles Fuller	Won
1982	Pulitzer Prize	Drama	Charles Fuller	Won

=== Off-Broadway Revival (2005) ===
Year	Award	Category	Nominee	Result
2006	Artios Awards	New York Off-Broadway	Tara Rubin	Nominated
2006	Drama League Awards	Outstanding Revival of a Play		Nominated
2006	Drama League Awards	Distinguished Performance Award	Taye Diggs	Nominated
2006	Drama League Awards	Distinguished Performance Award	Anthony Mackie	Nominated

=== Broadway Revival (2020) ===
Year	Award	Category	Nominee	Result
2020	Tony Awards	Best Revival of a Play		Won
2020	Tony Awards	Best Performance by a Leading Actor in a Play	Blair Underwood	Nominated
2020	Tony Awards	Best Performance by a Featured Actor in a Play	David Alan Grier	Won
2020	Tony Awards	Best Direction of a Play	Kenny Leon	Nominated
2020	Tony Awards	Best Scenic Design in a Play	Derek McLane	Nominated
2020	Tony Awards	Best Costume Design in a Play	Dede Ayite	Nominated
2020	Tony Awards	Best Lighting Design in a Play	Allen Lee Hughes	Nominated
2020	Drama Desk Awards	Outstanding Revival of a Play		Won
2020	Drama Desk Awards	Outstanding Featured Actor in a Play	David Alan Grier	Nominated
2020	Drama Desk Awards	Outstanding Fight Choreography	Thomas Schall	Won
2020	Drama League Awards	Outstanding Revival of a Play		Won
2020	Drama League Awards	Distinguished Performance Award	David Alan Grier	Nominated
2020	Drama League Awards	Distinguished Performance Award	Blair Underwood	Nominated
2020	Outer Critics Circle Awards	Outstanding Revival of a Play		Honoree
2020	Outer Critics Circle Awards	Outstanding Featured Actor in a Play	David Alan Grier	Honoree
2020	Outer Critics Circle Awards	Outstanding Director of a Play	Kenny Leon	Honoree
