= Ronald K. Brown =

American choreographer

Ronald K Brown
- Born: 1967 (age 58–59)
- Occupations: Dancer, choreographer
- Years active: 28 years

Ronald K. Brown is a dancer and choreographer, who founded the dance company Evidence in New York in 1985. Brown's work incorporates modern dance, Senegalese Sabar and other West African movement vocabularies, Afro-Caribbean dance, and contemporary urban dance from around the world. He has choreographed numerous works for his own company, as well as for Philadanco, Alvin Ailey American Dance Theater, the Jacob's Pillow Dance Festival, the Maimouna Keita West African Dance Company, and many others. Brown has received numerous awards, including a Guggenheim Fellowship, a Bessie Award, a Black Theater Alliance Award, and an Audelco Award for the choreography of Regina Taylor's musical Crowns. He has also been a guest artist at The Sharon Disney Lund School of Dance at CalArts. He studied dance with Mary Anthony.
