= Bella: An American Tall Tale =

- Music: Kirsten Childs
- Lyrics: Kirsten Childs
- Book: Kirsten Childs
- Premiere: September 22, 2016: Dallas Theatre Center, Dallas, Texas
- Productions: 2016 Dallas, Texas; 2017 Playwrights Horizons (Off-Broadway)

Bella: An American Tall Tale is a stage musical with book, music, and lyrics by Kirsten Childs. The musical is set in the 1870s and tells a tale of the American frontier from the perspective of an African-American woman.

The musical originally premiered at Dallas Theatre Center on September 22, 2016, before its Off-Broadway premiere at Playwrights Horizons on May 19, 2017. The Off-Broadway production was co-presented by Playwrights Horizons and Dallas Theatre Center.

== Development ==
Kirsten Childs noticed that African Americans were not included in history books about the 1870s in the Wild West, and decided "to create a new myth celebrating the power and the beauty of the black female".

The character of Nathaniel Beckworth, a train porter, is based on a real-life African American train porter named Nat Love. His last name "Beckworth" comes from James Beckwourth, who was an explorer, rancher, and fur trader. Tommie Haw is another real-life character that appears in Bella. Childs learned about his story while researching the Mai Wah Society in Butte, Montana, which works to document the history of Asian-Americans in the Rocky Mountains.

== Synopsis ==
Bella takes place in the 1870s in the Old West. Bella, a "Big Booty Tupelo Girl," sets off to Kansas to meet her fiancé, Aloysius T. Honeycutt, who is a Buffalo Soldier. Bella must make this journey under a false name in order to escape the law. Back home in Tupelo, Mississippi, Bella is in trouble for beating up Bonny Jonny. Her Mama, Grandma, and Aunt Dinah encourage her to leave the state so that she is not arrested. When Bella boards the train headed for Kansas, she attracts the attention of the passengers because of her large bottom. While on the train journey, Bella has fantasies about a gaucho and a Chinese cowboy. A porter on the train, Nathaniel Beckworth, falls in love with Bella.

== Cast and Character ==
- Ashley D. Kelley — Bella
- Marinda Anderson — Ida Lou/Aunt Dinah
- Yurel Echezarreta — Diego Moreno/CP Conyers
- Brandon Gill — Nathaniel Beckworth
- Olli Haaskivi — Gabriel Conyers/Scooter
- Josh Davis, Kevin Massey — Snaggletooth Hoskins/Bonny Jonny
- Jo’Nathan Michael — Mr. Dinwiddie/Scumbucket
- Kenita R. Miller — Miss Cabbagestalk/Mama
- Paolo Montalban — Tommie Haw/Skeeter
- Clifton Oliver — Aloysius T. Hunnicut
- Gabrielle Reyes — Mrs. Dinwiddie/Nurse
- NaTasha Yvette Williams — Grandma/Spirit of the Booty

== Musical Numbers ==
Act I

- "Big Booty Tupelo Gal" — Bella
- "The Language of My Nose and Lips and Hair" — Grandma, Aunt Dinah, Bella, Mama
- "Private Hunnicutt's Letter" — Aloysius
- "Quien Fuera Luna" — Diego Moreno, Miss Cabbagestalk, Bella
- "What I Want" — Bella, Nathaniel
- "Kansas Boun'" — Mama, Bella
- "Gal Over Younder" — Nathaniel, Bella
- "Tommie Haw" — Tommie Haw
- "Rollin' Along" — Bella, Nathaniel
- "Heaven Must Be Tupelo" — Bella
- "Bonny Johnny Rakehell" — Bonny Jonny, Bella
- "One Ass to Another" — Spirit of the Booty, Bonny Jonny, Bella

Act II

- "Bide a Little Time at the Circus" — Gabriel Conyers, Bella
- "White People Tonight" — Bella, CP Conyers
- "Trav'lin the World" — Bella, CP, Gabriel
- "Mama, Where Did You Go?" — Mama
- "Don't Start No S**t" — Aloysius
- "Nothin' But a Man" — Nathaniel
- "You Don't Know What Ya Got Until It's Gone" — Spirit of the Booty, Bella
- "Impossible" — Bella
- "Finale" — Bella, Company
