= 74th Tony Awards =

2021 US theatrical awards ceremony

- Promotional poster
- Date: September 26, 2021
- Location: Winter Garden Theatre
- Hosted by: Audra McDonald (ceremony); Leslie Odom Jr. (Broadway's Back!)

Highlights
- Most wins: Moulin Rouge! (10)
- Most nominations: Jagged Little Pill (15)
- Website: tonyawards.com

Television/radio coverage
- Network: Paramount+ (ceremony); CBS (Broadway's Back!)
- Runtime: 2 hours (ceremony); 2 hours (Broadway's Back!)
- Viewership: 2.8 million (Broadway's Back!)
- Produced by: Ricky Kirshner; Glenn Weiss
- Directed by: Glenn Weiss

The 74th Tony Awards were held on September 26, 2021, to recognize achievement in Broadway productions during the 2019–20 season. After being delayed due to the COVID-19 pandemic in New York City, the ceremony was held at the Winter Garden Theatre and was broadcast in two separate parts on CBS and Paramount+. Audra McDonald and Leslie Odom Jr. served as hosts.

The musical Jagged Little Pill led the nominations with 15, while the play with the most nominations was Slave Play, with 12. At the ceremony, Moulin Rouge! won ten awards, including Best Musical, becoming the production with the most wins of the season. The Old Vic production of A Christmas Carol won five awards, and The Inheritance won four, including Best Play. At 90 years old, Lois Smith became the oldest performer to win a Tony Award for acting, receiving the award for Featured Actress in a Play.

== Background ==
Originally scheduled to be held on June 7, 2020, at Radio City Music Hall in New York City and televised by CBS, the ceremony was postponed indefinitely due to the COVID-19 pandemic. Nominations were originally scheduled to be announced on April 28, 2020. Various receptions were scheduled to be held, including the Meet the Nominees Press reception (April 30) and Tony Nominees luncheon (May 19). At the Tony Honors reception, the Tony Honors for Excellence in the Theatre award was to be presented. On March 25, 2020, it was announced that the ceremony and all associated events had been postponed indefinitely due to the COVID-19 pandemic in the United States. New York had ordered the closure of all Broadway theatres on March 12 due to restrictions on gatherings. The ceremony's broadcaster CBS aired a sing-along version of the film adaptation of Grease on the Tony Awards' originally-scheduled night.

On August 21, 2020, it was announced that the ceremony would be held virtually later in the year, with further details to be announced at a later date. No subsequent date in the year was ever set. The nominations were announced on October 15, 2020, by James Monroe Iglehart. Voting for the Tony Awards was held from March 1–15, 2021, and the ceremony was announced to be held in conjunction with the reopening of Broadway. Jagged Little Pill led the nominations with fifteen, and Slave Play's twelve nominations broke the record for most nominations for a non-musical play (11) set by Angels in America at the 2018 ceremony.

== Ceremony information ==
On May 26, 2021, it was announced that the ceremony would be held on September 26 of that year in a format that differed from previous years. Paramount+ first streamed a two-hour ceremony at 7:00 p.m. ET with presentations of the awards for individual categories. CBS then aired a two-hour primetime special, The Tony Awards Present: Broadway's Back!, presented as a concert to "celebrate the joy and magic of live theatre". The special included performances of "beloved classics" and the three Best Musical nominees, and the presentation of the awards for Best Musical, Best Revival of a Play, and Best Play. On September 13, Audra McDonald and Leslie Odom Jr. were announced as hosts of the Tony Awards ceremony and Broadway's Back! special respectively.

In explaining the decision to split the ceremony between two platforms, producers Ricky Kirshner and Glenn Weiss said that allowed for a four-hour ceremony in total, as opposed to the typical three-hour limit imposed on a television-exclusive broadcast. Kirshner said that this also gave the chance to air complete acceptance speeches for winners in all categories, saying "In the past, a lot of these awards have been in a pre-show where they got a 10 second blurb on the air. Now they get their full award on the air."

=== Performances ===
==== Tony Awards ====
- "You Can't Stop the Beat" (from Hairspray) – Marissa Jaret Winokur, Matthew Morrison, Kerry Butler, Chester Gregory & Darlene Love
- "What I Did for Love" (from A Chorus Line) – Ali Stroker
- "Anyone Can Whistle" (from the musical of the same name) – Jennifer Nettles
- "And I Am Telling You I'm Not Going" (from Dreamgirls) – Jennifer Holliday

==== Broadway's Back! ====
- "Broadway's Back Tonight!" (opening number) – Leslie Odom Jr.
- "Burning Down the House" – American Utopia
- "My Girl" / "Ain't Too Proud to Beg" – John Legend and the cast of Ain't Too Proud
- "Lady Marmalade" / "Because We Can" – Moulin Rouge!
- Broadway Advocacy Coalition
- "Move On" (from Sunday in the Park with George) – Ben Platt & Anika Noni Rose
- "Ironic" / "All I Really Want" – Jagged Little Pill
- "Beautiful City" (from Godspell) – Josh Groban & Odom
- "The Impossible Dream (The Quest)" (from Man of La Mancha) – Brian Stokes Mitchell
- "Somewhere" (from West Side Story) – Norm Lewis & Kelli O'Hara
- "We Don't Need Another Hero (Thunderdome)" / "The Best" / "Proud Mary" – Tina
- "It Takes Two" (from Into the Woods) – Tituss Burgess & Andrew Rannells
- "You Matter to Me" (from Waitress) – Odom & Nicolette Robinson
- "For Good" (from Wicked) – Kristin Chenoweth & Idina Menzel
- "What You Own" (from Rent) – Adam Pascal & Anthony Rapp
- "Wheels of a Dream" (from Ragtime) – Audra McDonald & Mitchell
- Freestyle Love Supreme

== Eligibility ==
The official eligibility cut-off date for Broadway productions opening in the 2019–20 season was originally to have been April 23, 2020. As a result of the COVID-19 pandemic cutting the 2019–20 theatre season short, on August 21, 2020, it was announced that only the 18 shows that opened before February 19, 2020, would be considered eligible. A revival of West Side Story that opened February 20, 2020 and the new musical Girl from the North Country, which opened March 5, 2020, were thus not considered eligible because too few nominators and voters saw them before Broadway shut down on March 12, 2020. This meant that for the first time since 1993, there was no award for Best Revival of a Musical given out, as there were no eligible productions. Girl From the North Country was nominated the following year.

Original Plays

- A Christmas Carol
- Grand Horizons
- The Great Society
- The Height of the Storm
- The Inheritance
- Linda Vista
- My Name Is Lucy Barton
- Sea Wall/A Life
- Slave Play
- The Sound Inside

Original Musicals

- Jagged Little Pill
- The Lightning Thief: The Percy Jackson Musical
- Moulin Rouge!
- Tina

Play Revivals

- Betrayal
- Frankie and Johnny in the Clair de Lune
- The Rose Tattoo
- A Soldier's Play

== Non-competitive awards ==
Special Tony Awards were given to the following:

- The Broadway Advocacy Coalition
- David Byrne's American Utopia
- Freestyle Love Supreme

The award for Lifetime Achievement in the Theatre was given to Graciela Daniele. Julie Halston received the Isabelle Stevenson Award.

== Winners and nominees ==
Winners are listed first, and are highlighted in boldface:

| Best Play ‡ | Best Musical ‡ |
|---|---|
| **The Inheritance – Matthew López**; Grand Horizons – Bess Wohl; Sea Wall/A Life – Simon Stephens and Nick Payne; Slave Play – Jeremy O. Harris; The Sound Inside – Adam Rapp | **Moulin Rouge!**; Jagged Little Pill; Tina |
| Best Revival of a Play ‡ | Best Book of a Musical |
| **A Soldier's Play**; Betrayal; Frankie and Johnny in the Clair de Lune | **Diablo Cody – Jagged Little Pill**; John Logan – Moulin Rouge!; Katori Hall, Frank Ketelaar, and Kees Prins – Tina |
| Best Performance by a Leading Actor in a Play | Best Performance by a Leading Actress in a Play |
| **Andrew Burnap – The Inheritance as Toby Darling**; Ian Barford – Linda Vista as Wheeler; Jake Gyllenhaal – Sea Wall/A Life as Abe; Tom Hiddleston – Betrayal as Robert; Tom Sturridge – Sea Wall/A Life as Alex; Blair Underwood – A Soldier's Play as Captain Richard Davenport | **Mary-Louise Parker – The Sound Inside as Bella**; Joaquina Kalukango – Slave Play as Kaneisha; Laura Linney – My Name Is Lucy Barton as Lucy Barton; Audra McDonald – Frankie and Johnny in the Clair de Lune as Frankie |
| Best Performance by a Leading Actor in a Musical | Best Performance by a Leading Actress in a Musical |
| **Aaron Tveit – Moulin Rouge! as Christian** | **Adrienne Warren – Tina as Tina Turner**; Karen Olivo – Moulin Rouge! as Satine; Elizabeth Stanley – Jagged Little Pill as Mary Jane "M.J." Healy |
| Best Performance by a Featured Actor in a Play | Best Performance by a Featured Actress in a Play |
| **David Alan Grier – A Soldier's Play as Sergeant Vernon C. Waters**; Ato Blankson-Wood – Slave Play as Gary; James Cusati-Moyer – Slave Play as Dustin; John Benjamin Hickey – The Inheritance as Henry Wilcox; Paul Hilton – The Inheritance as Morgan/Walter Poole | **Lois Smith – The Inheritance as Margaret**; Jane Alexander – Grand Horizons as Nancy; Chalia La Tour – Slave Play as Teá; Annie McNamara – Slave Play as Alana; Cora Vander Broek – Linda Vista as Jules |
| Best Performance by a Featured Actor in a Musical | Best Performance by a Featured Actress in a Musical |
| **Danny Burstein – Moulin Rouge! as Harold Zidler**; Derek Klena – Jagged Little Pill as Nicholas "Nick" Healy; Sean Allan Krill – Jagged Little Pill as Steve Healy; Sahr Ngaujah – Moulin Rouge! as Henri de Toulouse-Lautrec; Daniel J. Watts – Tina as Ike Turner | **Lauren Patten – Jagged Little Pill as Joanne "Jo" Taylor**; Kathryn Gallagher – Jagged Little Pill as Bella Fox; Celia Rose Gooding – Jagged Little Pill as Mary Frances "Frankie" Healy; Robyn Hurder – Moulin Rouge! as Nini; Myra Lucretia Taylor – Tina as Gran Georgeanna |
| Best Direction of a Play | Best Direction of a Musical |
| **Stephen Daldry – The Inheritance**; David Cromer – The Sound Inside; Kenny Leon – A Soldier's Play; Jamie Lloyd – Betrayal; Robert O'Hara – Slave Play | **Alex Timbers – Moulin Rouge!**; Phyllida Lloyd – Tina; Diane Paulus – Jagged Little Pill |
| Best Original Score (Music and/or Lyrics Written for the Theatre) | Best Choreography |
| **Christopher Nightingale (music) – A Christmas Carol**; Paul Englishby (music) – The Inheritance; Fitz Patton and Jason Michael Webb (music) – The Rose Tattoo; Lindsay Jones (music) – Slave Play; Daniel Kluger (music) – The Sound Inside | **Sonya Tayeh – Moulin Rouge!**; Sidi Larbi Cherkaoui – Jagged Little Pill; Anthony Van Laast – Tina |
| Best Scenic Design in a Play | Best Scenic Design in a Musical |
| **Rob Howell – A Christmas Carol**; Bob Crowley – The Inheritance; Soutra Gilmour – Betrayal; Derek McLane – A Soldier's Play; Clint Ramos – Slave Play | **Derek McLane – Moulin Rouge!**; Riccardo Hernández and Lucy MacKinnon – Jagged Little Pill; Mark Thompson and Jeff Sugg – Tina |
| Best Costume Design in a Play | Best Costume Design in a Musical |
| **Rob Howell – A Christmas Carol**; Dede Ayite – Slave Play; Dede Ayite – A Soldier's Play; Bob Crowley – The Inheritance; Clint Ramos – The Rose Tattoo | **Catherine Zuber – Moulin Rouge!**; Emily Rebholz – Jagged Little Pill; Mark Thompson – Tina |
| Best Lighting Design in a Play | Best Lighting Design in a Musical |
| **Hugh Vanstone – A Christmas Carol**; Jiyoun Chang – Slave Play; Jon Clark – The Inheritance; Heather Gilbert – The Sound Inside; Allen Lee Hughes – A Soldier's Play | **Justin Townsend – Moulin Rouge!**; Bruno Poet – Tina; Justin Townsend – Jagged Little Pill |
| Best Sound Design of a Play | Best Sound Design of a Musical |
| **Simon Baker – A Christmas Carol**; Paul Arditti and Christopher Reid – The Inheritance; Lindsay Jones – Slave Play; Daniel Kluger – Sea Wall/A Life; Daniel Kluger – The Sound Inside | **Peter Hylenski – Moulin Rouge!**; Jonathan Deans – Jagged Little Pill; Nevin Steinberg – Tina |
Best Orchestrations
**Katie Kresek, Charlie Rosen, Matt Stine and Justin Levine – Moulin Rouge!**; Tom Kitt – Jagged Little Pill; Ethan Popp – Tina

‡ The award is presented to the producer(s) of the musical or play.

=== Productions with multiple nominations and awards ===
Productions with multiple nominations
| Nominations | Production |
|---|---|
| 15 | Jagged Little Pill |
| 14 | Moulin Rouge! |
| 12 | Slave Play |
| 12 | Tina |
| 11 | The Inheritance |
| 7 | A Soldier's Play |
| 6 | The Sound Inside |
| 5 | A Christmas Carol |
| 4 | Betrayal |
| 4 | Sea Wall/A Life |
| 2 | Frankie and Johnny in the Clair de Lune |
| 2 | Grand Horizons |
| 2 | Linda Vista |
| 2 | The Rose Tattoo |

Productions with multiple wins
| Awards | Production |
|---|---|
| 10 | Moulin Rouge! |
| 5 | A Christmas Carol |
| 4 | The Inheritance |
| 2 | Jagged Little Pill |
| 2 | A Soldier's Play |

== Reception ==
=== Critical reviews ===
Greg Evans of Deadline Hollywood called the show "truly excellent television", and praised the two-part format, writing "The no-nonsense presentation of award announcements and acceptance speeches was followed by a lively special that impressively showcased contemporary Broadway musicals on their home turfs and classic reunions that felt fresh and welcome." However, he criticized the program's emphasis on musicals, commenting, "the non-musical plays got unforgivably short shrift." In Variety, Clayton Davis praised it as "a sensational awards ceremony" and described the show as "a near flawless and detailed blueprint on how [other awards ceremonies] should assemble their future ceremonies to bring forth an inviting place for people of all backgrounds, and an impeccable pace to keep your attention." He also commended the show's tone, concluding, "The Tonys were pure, not shy about the times we were in — and they sent a signal of hope for our futures."

Conversely, however, Tim Teeman of The Daily Beast dismissed the Broadway's Back! portion of the show as "a purely commercial exercise based on telling people who kind of like theater that Broadway was back, and needs their financial support" and accused the ceremony at large of sending "mixed messages" about its industry, contrasting calls for diversity from winners and presenters with Slave Play, a work which addresses racism as a central theme, failing to win a single award. He also criticized the decision to present the vast majority of awards on the Paramount+ livestream, instead of on the CBS telecast, writing "A Tonys-themed song and dance show may suit ratings-counters at the network [...] But if you're going to show an awards show, show an awards show."

=== Ratings ===
The Broadway's Back! special received 2.8 million viewers during its CBS telecast, an approximate 50% decline in viewership from the 73rd Tony Awards in 2019. Rick Porter of The Hollywood Reporter said that the loss may have been attributable to certain mitigating factors, such as most awards being handed out during the Paramount+ portion of the program, and the ceremony taking place in September, as opposed to its usual June date, putting it in conflict with the fall television season.

== In Memoriam ==
Brian Stokes Mitchell performed the song The Impossible Dream (The Quest) from the musical Man Of La Mancha and Norm Lewis and Kelli O’Hara performed Somewhere from the musical West Side Story.

- Ann Reinking
- Melvin Van Peebles
- Peter Nichols
- Valerie Harper
- Tony Tanner
- Terry Hands
- Sondra Gilman
- Shirley Knight
- Robert F.X. Sillerman
- Samuel E. Wright
- Rebecca Luker
- Joseph Shabalala
- Brent Carver
- Roger Horchow
- Herbert Kretzmer
- Orson Bean
- Franco Zeffirelli
- Isabel Toledo
- Max Wright
- James Lipton
- Darren P. DerVerna
- Lee Breuer
- Pat Collins
- Bob Swash
- Anton Coppola
- Ian Holm
- Gershon Kingsley
- Margo Lion
- Elizabeth I. McCann
- Ed Asner
- Jackie Mason
- Cloris Leachman
- Robert Fletcher
- Phyllis Newman
- Peter Larkin
- Ann Crumb
- Peter Wright
- Martin Markinson
- Biff McGuire
- Louis Johnson
- Christopher Plummer
- Thomas Jefferson Byrd
- Bob Avian
- Bernard Slade
- Richard Easton
- Martin Charnin
- Jonathan Miller
- Howell Binkley
- Marion McClinton
- Arthur Kopit
- Douglas Turner Ward
- Jerry Stiller
- Anthony Powell
- Hal Holbrook
- Bernard Gersten
- René Auberjonois
- Roger Berlind
- Al Kasha
- Ming Cho Lee
- Arthur T. Birsh
- Peter H. Hunt
- Diana Rigg
- Rip Torn
- Clarence Williams III
- Lisa Banes
- Diahann Carroll
- Allee Willis
- William F. Brown
- Ron Leibman
- Philip J. Smith
- Zoe Caldwell
- Jacki Barlia Florin
- Larry Kramer
- Gerald Hiken
- Adam Schlesinger
- Anna Quayle
- Paul Ritter
- Nick Cordero
- Olympia Dukakis
- Micki Grant
- Brian Dennehy
- Lois De Banzie
- Anthony Chisholm
- Herbert Goldsmith
- Peg Murray
- Walter C. Miller
- Cicely Tyson
- Jerry Herman
- Harold Prince
- Elliot Lawrence
- Terrence McNally

== See also ==
- Drama Desk Awards
- 2020 Laurence Olivier Awards – equivalent awards for West End theatre productions
- Obie Award
- New York Drama Critics' Circle
- Theatre World Award
- Lucille Lortel Awards
