= Antonyo Awards =

Awards recognizing Black artists in theatre

The Awards
- Awarded for: Excellence of Black artists in theatre
- Country: United States
- Presented by: Broadway Black
- First award: 2020; 6 years ago

The Antonyo Awards are awards recognizing excellence of Black artists in theatre. Founded in 2020, the awards ceremony was produced by Broadway Black and honors Black artists from both the Broadway and Off-Broadway theatre communities.

For their second award season, they renamed the award to The Awards.

== Founding and inaugural ceremony ==
The Antonyo Awards were created in 2020 by Drew Shade. Shade founded Broadway Black in 2012, an organization that supports Black theatre and which helped produce the awards ceremony. Dustin Ross, a close friend of Shade, named the ceremony the "Antonyo Awards" as a light-hearted joke in reference to The Tony Awards. An additional purpose of the awards is to shed light on systemic racism in the New York theatre, a mostly-white institution, in the light of the racial protests that rocked America following the murder of George Floyd, and the deaths of Breonna Taylor, Eric Garner, and others. No one was paid to participate in or run these awards.

The nominees were selected by a nominating committee. However, since it was not as easy to get voters to see every show due to the shutdown of theatres across the nation due to the pandemic, the winners were chosen by people voting online. Around 8,000 people voted. There were no gendered categories. Also, all presenters and winners had their pronouns listed as well as their names on screen.

Due to the COVID-19 pandemic, there were no live awards in the inaugural ceremony. The awards took place over a YouTube livestream. The ceremony took place on June 19, 2020, since Juneteenth is the holiday commemorating the freedom from slavery for Black Americans in 1865. However, despite there being no live ceremony, there was a "red carpet" livestream one hour before the ceremony hosted by Chadaé McAlister, as well as an after-party hosted by Amber Iman with music by DJ Dorian, Both featured interviews with nominees and winners. The ceremony was hosted by Drew Shade. The event not only included the announcing of the winners, but also musical performances, skits, and monologues by Black playwrights performed by Black theatre artists that highlighted the struggles, joys and resilience of Black artists. Additionally, due to the coronavirus preventing many graduations from happening, nominee and actor Shereen Pimentel gave a commencement speech to the class of 2020, as she would have been graduating in 2020.

There were four non-competitive awards called the Kinfolk Awards which were created to honor individuals who were committed to the advancement of Black theatre in New York City. The Lorraine Hansberry Award was given to a female identifying or nonbinary femme Black playwright or book writer who incorporates themes of social justice into their work. The Langston Hughes Award was given to a male-identifying or nonbinary masculine Black playwright or book writer who balances storytelling and social justice ideology in their work. The Welcome Award is for a Black newcomer to New York City theatre. The Doors of the Theatre are Open Award is for a theatre company that has been dedicated to uplifting Black voices.

== Recipients ==
=== 2020 ===
Award	Recipient	Production
Best Play	Aziza Barnes	BLKS
Best Play	Donja R. Love	One in Two
Best Play	Lydia R. Diamond	Toni Stone
Best Play	C.A. Johnson	All the Natalie Portmans
Best Play	Zora Howard	STEW
Best Play	Eboni Booth	Paris
Best Musical	Tina: The Tina Turner Musical	
Best Musical	The Secret Life of Bees	
Best Musical	A Strange Loop	
Best Musical	The Wrong Man	
Best Musical	Girl From North Country	
Best Musical	Jagged Little Pill	
Best Revival	For Colored Girls Who Have Considered Suicide/when the rainbow is enuf	
Best Revival	West Side Story	
Best Revival	Native Son	
Best Revival	Little Shop of Horrors	
Best Revival	Fires in the Mirror	
Best Revival	Two Can Play	
Best Actor in a Play Off-Broadway	Danielle Brooks	Much Ado About Nothing
Best Actor in a Play Off-Broadway	Kara Young	All the Natalie Portmans
Best Actor in a Play Off-Broadway	Portia	STEW
Best Actor in a Play Off-Broadway	April Mathis	Toni Stone
Best Actor in a Play Off-Broadway	Kristolyn Lloyd	Little Women
Best Actor in a Play Off-Broadway	Ato Blankson Wood	The Rolling Stone
Best Actor in a Play On Broadway	Audra McDonald	Frankie and Johnny in the Clair de Lune
Best Actor in a Play On Broadway	LaChanze	A Christmas Carol
Best Actor in a Play On Broadway	Joaquina Kalukango	Slave Play
Best Actor in a Play On Broadway	Blair Underwood	A Soldier's Play
Best Actor in a Musical Off-Broadway	LaChanze	The Secret Life of Bees
Best Actor in a Musical Off-Broadway	Ciara Renée	The Wrong Man
Best Actor in a Musical Off-Broadway	Joshua Henry	The Wrong Man
Best Actor in a Musical Off-Broadway	Larry Owens	A Strange Loop
Best Actor in a Musical Off-Broadway	Janelle McDermoth	We're Gonna Die
Best Actor in a Musical Off-Broadway	Danyel Fulton	Broadbend, Arkansas
Best Actor in a Musical On Broadway	Adrienne Warren	Tina: The Tina Turner Musical
Best Actor in a Musical On Broadway	Kimber Elayne Sprawl	Girl From the North Country
Best Actor in a Musical On Broadway	Isaac Cole Powell	West Side Story
Best Actor in a Musical On Broadway	Shereen Pimentel	West Side Story
Best Actor in a Musical On Broadway	Daniel J. Watts	Tina: The Tina Turner Musical
Best Featured Actor in a Play Off-Broadway	Okwui Okpokwasili	For Colored Girls Who Have Considered Suicide/ when the rainbow is enuf
Best Featured Actor in a Play Off-Broadway	Leland Fowler	One in Two
Best Featured Actor in a Play Off-Broadway	Nicco Annan	The Hot Wing King
Best Featured Actor in a Play Off-Broadway	Crystal Lucas-Perry	A Bright Room Called Day
Best Featured Actor in a Play Off-Broadway	John-Andrew Morrison	Blues for an Alabama Sky
Best Featured Actor in a Play Off-Broadway	Latoya Edwards	The Rolling Stone
Best Featured Actor in a Play On Broadway	Chalia La Tour	Slave Play
Best Featured Actor in a Play On Broadway	David Alan Grier	A Soldier's Play
Best Featured Actor in a Play On Broadway	Ato Blankson-Wood	Slave Play
Best Featured Actor in a Play On Broadway	Zawe Ashton	Betrayal
Best Featured Actor in a Play On Broadway	Grantham Coleman	The Great Society
Best Featured Actor in a Play On Broadway	Jordan Barbour	The Inheritance
Best Featured Actor in a Musical Off-Broadway	Jasmine Cephas Jones	Cyrano
Best Featured Actor in a Musical Off-Broadway	John-Andrew Morrison	A Strange Loop
Best Featured Actor in a Musical Off-Broadway	L Morgan Lee	A Strange Loop
Best Featured Actor in a Musical Off-Broadway	Starr Busby	Octet
Best Featured Actor in a Musical Off-Broadway	Saycon Sengbloh	The Secret Life of Bees
Best Featured Actor in a Musical Off-Broadway	Taylor Iman Jones	Scotland, PA
Best Featured Actor in a Musical On Broadway	Celia Rose Gooding	Jagged Little Pill
Best Featured Actor in a Musical On Broadway	Sahr Ngaujah	Moulin Rouge!
Best Featured Actor in a Musical On Broadway	Jeanette Bayardelle	Girl From the North Country
Best Featured Actor in a Musical On Broadway	Dharon E. Jones	West Side Story
Best Solo Performance	Michael Benjamin Washington	Fires in the Mirror
Best Solo Performance	Donnetta Lavinia Grays	Where We Stand
Best Solo Performance	Dierdra McDowell	Down to Eartha
Best Director	Lileana Blain-Cruz	Anatomy of A Suicide
Best Director	Stevie Walker-Webb	One in Two
Best Director	Robert O’Hara	BLKS
Best Director	Whitney White	Our Dear Dead Drug Lord
Best Director	Colette Robert	STEW
Best Director	Raja Feather Kelly	We're Gonna Die
Best Choreography	Camille A. Brown	For Colored Girls Who Have Considered Suicide/when the rainbow is enuf
Best Choreography	Raja Feather Kelly	A Strange Loop
Best Choreography	Edisa Weeks	Novenas for a Lost Hospital
Best Choreography	Adesola Osakalumi	Coal Country
Best Choreography	Byron Easley	Slave Play
Best Choreography	nicHi Douglas	Skinfolk: An American Show
Best Quarantine Content	Daniel J. Watts	The Jam IG Live
Best Quarantine Content	Edward Mawere	#BroadwayRemixChallenge
Best Quarantine Content	Camille A. Brown	Social Dance for Social Distance
Best Quarantine Content	Drew Shade	Inside The Mind, a Mental Wellness Series
Best Quarantine Content	Jordan E. Cooper	Mama Got A Cough
Best Quarantine Content	Sis	Living with Sis IG Series
Best Lighting Design	Allen Lee Hughes	A Soldier's Play
Best Lighting Design	Allen Lee Hughes	Toni Stone
Best Lighting Design	Alan C. Edwards	The Hot Wing King
Best Lighting Design	Stacey Derosier	Novenas For A Lost Hospital
Best Scenic Design	Lawrence E. Moten IIIs	Native Son
Best Sound	Rucyl Frison	Anatomy of a Suicide
Best Sound	Justin Ellington	One in Two
Best Sound	Luqman Brown	The Hot Wing King
Best Costumes	Toni-Leslie James	For Colored Girls Who Have Considered Suicide/when the rainbow is enuf
Best Costumes	Dede Ayite	BLKS
Best Costumes	Andy Jean	One in Two
Best Costumes	Karen Perry	runboyrun/ In Old Age
Best Costumes	Sarita P Fellows	Native Son
Best Costumes	Ari Fulton	Novenas for a Lost Hospital
Best Hair & Wig Design	Nikiya Mathis	For Colored Girls Who Have Considered Suicide/when the rainbow is enuf
Best Hair & Wig Design	Nikiya Mathis	STEW
Best Hair & Wig Design	Cookie Jordan	Toni Stone
Best Hair & Wig Design	Cookie Jordan	A Strange Loop
Best Hair & Wig Design	Greg Cooper Spencer	A Soldier's Play
Best Orchestrations	Skinfolk: An American Show	
Best Orchestrations	The Secret Life of Bees	
Best Orchestrations	A Strange Loop	
Best Orchestrations	Tina: The Tina Turner Musical	
Best Orchestrations	We're Gonna Die	
Best Orchestrations	The Wrong Man	
Best Original Score	The Secret of Life Bees	
Best Original Score	A Strange Loop	
Best Original Score	Broadbend, Arkansas	
Best Original Score	The Wrong Man	
Best Original Score	We're Gonna Die	
Best Book	Michael R. Jackson	A Strange Loop
Best Book	Lynn Nottage	The Secret Life of Bees
Best Book	Katori Hall	Tina: A Tina Turner Musical
Best Book	Harrison David Rivers	Broadbend, Arkansas

=== Non-competitive awards ===
- Lifetime Achievement Award: Chuck Cooper

==== The Kinfolk Awards ====
Award	Recipient
Langston Hughes Award	Donja R. Love
Lorraine Hansberry Award	Loy. A. Webb
Welcome Award	Dharon E. Jones
The Doors of the Theatre are Open Award	The National Black Theatre

== In memoriam ==
=== 2020 ===
- Lucien Barbarin
- Diahann Carroll
- Walter Dallas
- Ja'Net DuBois
- Margaret Holloway
- Andile Gumbi
- Mykal D Laury II
- Dr. Vernell Lillie
- Lloyd Cornelius Porter
- Keldon Price
- L. Kenneth Richardson
- Darius Smith
- Danny Tidwell
