= Celia Rose Gooding =

American actor and singer (born 2000)

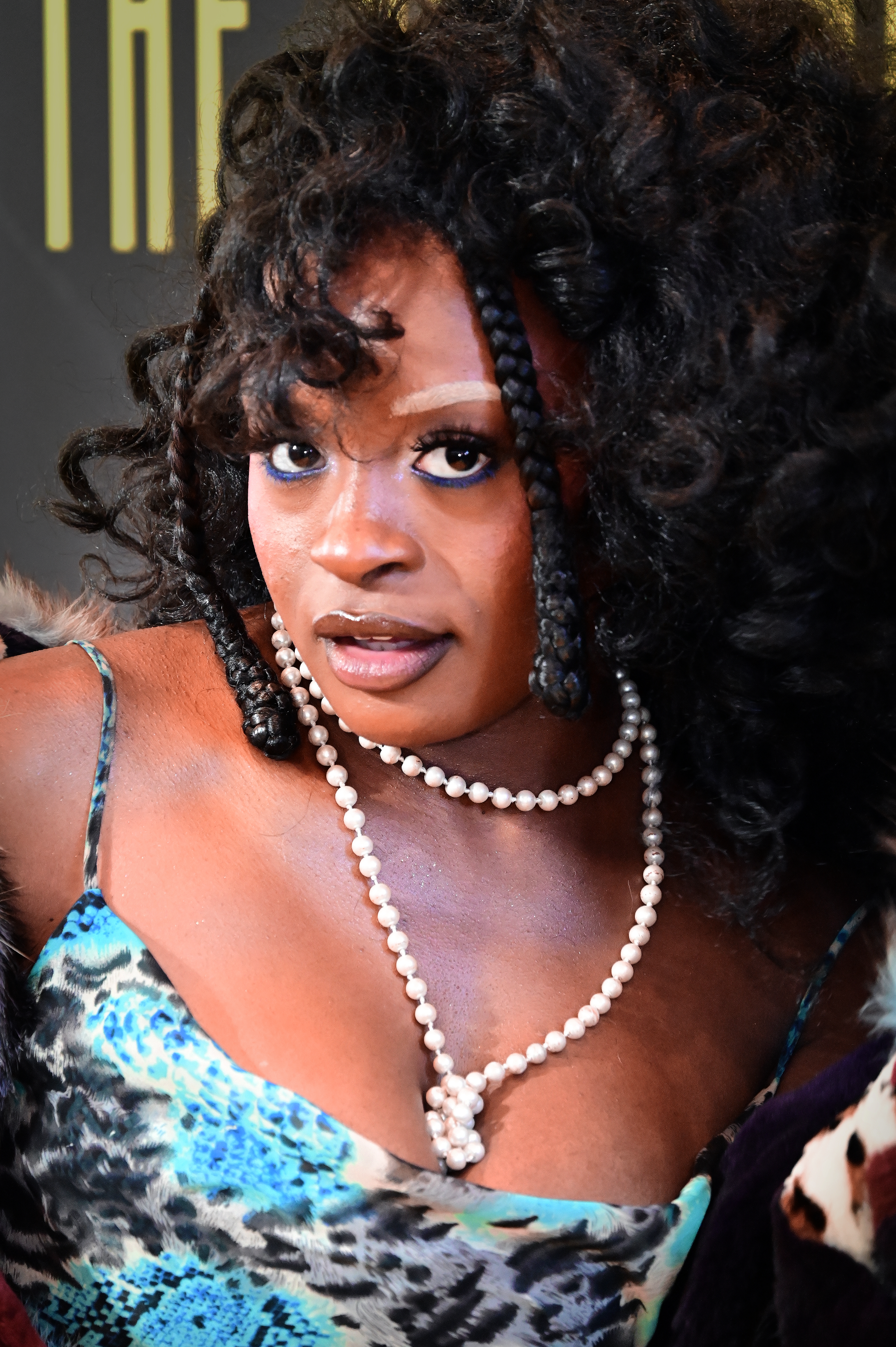
- Gooding in 2026
- Born: February 22, 2000 (age 26); New York City, New York, U.S.
- Occupations: Actor; singer
- Years active: 2017–present
- Known for: Jagged Little Pill; Star Trek: Strange New Worlds
- Mother: LaChanze
- Awards: Grammy Award for Best Musical Theater Album (2021); Antonyo Award (2020)

Celia Rose Gooding (/ˈsɛliə/; born February 22, 2000) is an American actor and singer. They (Note: Gooding uses they/them and she/her pronouns. This article uses they/them for consistency.) rose to prominence for their Broadway debut as Mary Frances "Frankie" Healy in the rock musical Jagged Little Pill for which they won a 2021 Grammy Award for Best Musical Theater Album and received a nomination for a 2020 Tony Award for Best Actress in a Featured Role in a Musical, becoming one of the youngest nominees in the category at age 20. Gooding plays the role of Nyota Uhura in the Paramount+ original series Star Trek: Strange New Worlds (2022–present).

== Early life ==
Gooding was born to actress, singer and dancer LaChanze, and Calvin Gooding, who died in the September 11 attacks. They have one sister, Zaya.

Gooding attended the Hackley School in Tarrytown, New York, with their sister and graduated with honors in performing arts. They occasionally took leaves of absence from high school to do readings for the musical Jagged Little Pill, which they were also involved in developing. In the workshop during their junior year, they had three hours of tutoring in the morning before rehearsals, to replace regular schooling. Their senior project revolved around their participation in the show's out-of-town tryout at the end of their senior year. Their other training included studying dance at the Alvin Ailey Institute and studying acting and film with a concentration in Shakespeare at the Berridge Conservatory in Normandy.

In 2018, Gooding began attending Pace University. Initially double majoring in musical theatre and child psychology, they dropped the latter major during their second and final semester.

== Acting career ==
Gooding was inspired to become an actor when they watched their mother win the Tony Award for Best Actress in a Leading Role in a Musical for The Color Purple in 2006 on TV. However, they only started participating in musical theatre productions in ninth grade. Throughout their high school experience, Gooding played various roles such as Carmen in the Rosetta LeNoire Musical Theatre Academy's production of Fame.

In 2017, at age 17, Gooding was cast in the first 29-hour reading of Jagged Little Pill, an original musical written by Diablo Cody based on the music of Grammy Award-winning artist Alanis Morissette, that included stars such as Idina Menzel. They originated one of the lead roles of the show, Frankie Healy: a 17-year-old Black, bisexual activist who was adopted into an affluent white family in a suburb in Connecticut. They participated in the 2018 lab and later the world premiere of the show at the American Repertory Theatre in Cambridge, Massachusetts in May 2018.

Gooding reprised their role as Frankie when the show transferred to Broadway in November 2019 at the Broadhurst Theatre. They received accolades including Broadway World's Debut of the Month a Clives Barnes Award nomination, and Broadway.com's Debut of the Year. They were also honored as one of BET's Future 40. They also performed on Late Night with Seth Meyers, Dick Clark's New Year's Rockin' Eve with Ryan Seacrest, and Good Morning America.

In 2019, Gooding and their mother, LaChanze, performed on Broadway at the same time, with LaChanze starring in A Christmas Carol and Gooding starring in Jagged Little Pill—a rare event previously accomplished by Debbie Reynolds and Carrie Fisher.

Gooding received accolades for their performance in Jagged Little Pill, which closed indefinitely due to the COVID-19 pandemic. They received the award for Best Actor in a Featured Role in a Musical at the inaugural Antonyo Awards and were nominated for the Tony Award for Best Actress in a Featured Role in a Musical. They also participated in the 2020 Playbill Pride Spectacular along with co-star Lauren Patten.

Gooding was cast as Nyota Uhura in the Paramount+ series Star Trek: Strange New Worlds.

On September 24, 2021, Gooding announced that they would not be returning to Jagged Little Pill due to alleged transphobic and abusive treatment of the show's non-binary cast members.

== Activism ==
Gooding has been particularly vocal about the issues surrounding being Black on Broadway. They participated in the New York Times' "Offstage" program in June 2020 that discussed racial justice on Broadway, a panel on ABC about the realities of being Black on Broadway for Black History Month, and a Black Theatre Matters benefit panel hosted by Samantha Williams.

Gooding has participated in a panel for normalizing consent and advocacy for sexual assault victims for the summer 2020 series, Transformation 2020: Popular Democracy Defined with co-star Kathryn Gallagher.

== Personal life ==
Gooding is bisexual, and gray asexual, Gooding is also non-binary, and uses she/her and they/them pronouns.

== Acting credits ==
=== Film ===
Year	Title	Role	Notes
2022	Breakwater	Jess	

=== Television ===
Year	Title	Role	Notes
2019	Good Morning America	Self	Episode: December 12, 2019
2019	Tamron Hall	Musical Guest	Episode: LaChanze/Celia Rose Gooding
2019	Today	Performer	
2019–2020	Broadway Profiles with Tamsen Fadal	Self	Five episodes: August on Broadway; November 2019; December 2019; January 2020; June 2020
2019–2020	Broadway.com #LiveatFive	Self	Two episodes: Celia Rose Gooding; Michael James Scott with Alex Newell, Celia Rose Gooding and Christian Dante White
2020	Stars in the House	Self	Four episodes; Jagged Little Pill Cast; Gen Z Broadway; Celebrating the 2020 Tony Awards Part 2; Thanksgiving Parade Stars
2020	Take Me to the World: A Sondheim 90th Birthday Celebration	Performer	I'm Still Here (Follies song)
2020	Project Sing Out!	Self	Also consulting producer
2020	Broadway Whodunit: Escape from Camp Eerie	Rebecca Garfinkel/Alberta Justice	Video
2020	Broadway Whodunit: All Hallows’ Eve	Bella Bram	Video
2020	My Halloween Friends	Self	Video short
2020	Arthur Miller Foundation Honors	Performer	TV special
2021	74th Tony Awards	Performer/Nominee	
2022–present	Star Trek: Strange New Worlds	Nyota Uhura	Main role

=== Theatre ===
Year	Production	Role	Venue	Dates	Notes
2018	Jagged Little Pill	Mary Frances "Frankie" Healy	Loeb Drama Center	May 5 – July 15, 2018	
2019–2020	Jagged Little Pill	Mary Frances "Frankie" Healy	Broadhurst Theatre	December 5, 2019 – March 12, 2020	
2021	Sisgendered	Self	Feinstein's/54 Below	December 7, 2021	Guest-star performer.

=== Web series ===
Year	Title	Role	Notes
2023	Star Trek: Very Short Treks	Nyota Uhura	Episode: "Holiday Party"
2025	Exandria Unlimited: Divergence	Rei'nia Saph	Actual play limited series
2025	Narrative Telephone	Herself	Episode: "Battle at the Big Top"; Episode: "A Flavorful Tale"

== Discography ==
=== Cast recordings ===
Title	Details
Jagged Little Pill (Original Broadway Cast Recording)	Release date: 2019; Label: Atlantic Records
Stone Crossed (Studio Concept Album)	Release date: 2021; Label: Broadway Records
Star Trek Strange New Worlds Season 2 - Subspace Rhapsody (Original Series Soundtrack)	Release date: 2023; Label: Lakeshore Records

== Accolades and honors ==
Year	Award	Category	Work	Result
2020	Clives Barnes Award	Theatre Artist Award	Jagged Little Pill	Pending
2020	Antonyo Awards	Best Actor in a Featured Role in a Musical on Broadway	Jagged Little Pill	Won
2020	Tony Awards	Best Actress in a Featured Role in a Musical	Jagged Little Pill	Nominated
2021	Grammy Awards	Best Musical Theater Album	Jagged Little Pill	Won
2024	Critics' Choice Television Awards	Best Supporting Actress in a Drama Series	Star Trek: Strange New Worlds	Nominated
2024	Saturn Awards	Best Supporting Actress in a Television Series	Star Trek: Strange New Worlds	Nominated

== See also ==
- African-American Tony nominees and winners
