= Outer Critics Circle Awards =

American NYC theater awards, since 1950

The Outer Critics Circle Awards are presented annually for theatrical achievements both on Broadway and Off-Broadway. They are presented by the Outer Critics Circle (OCC), the official organization of New York theater writers for out-of-town newspapers, digital and national publications, and other media beyond Broadway. The awards were first presented during the 1949–50 theater season.

== History ==
The Outer Critics Circle was founded as the Outer Circle during the Broadway season of 1949–50 by an assortment of theater critics led by John Gassner, a reviewer, essayist, dramaturg, and professor of theater. These critics were writing for academic publications, special interest journals, monthlies, quarterlies, and weekly publications outside the New York metro area, and were looking for a forum where they could discuss the theater in general, particularly the current New York season. The creation of the OCC was also a reaction to the New York Drama Critics Circle, which did not allow critics of lesser-known publications to join their ranks alongside writers of major New York and national publications. The first awards (for 1949–50) were: The Cocktail Party (Play); The Consul (Musical); Sheila Guyse, Performances in Supporting Roles for Lost in the Stars, and Daniel Reed, Performances in Supporting Roles for Come Back, Little Sheba.

In the early 1960s, the awards and forums of the OCC were supervised by Broadway veteran Charles K. Freeman and Joseph Kay, Manhattan reporter/critic for the Kansas City Star. This team was succeeded by Marjorie Gunner, who guided the group for 25 years before retiring in 2004. Simon Saltzman, a New Jersey–based theater critic, served as President until 2018, when he was succeeded by David Gordon of TheaterMania.

In addition to Gordon (president) and Saltzman (now President Emeritus), the Board of Directors currently includes Richard Ridge (Vice President), Joseph Cervelli (Recording Secretary), Patrick Hoffman (Corresponding Secretary), David Roberts (treasurer), Harry Haun (Historian), Cynthia Allen (Web Editor), Janice Simpson (Member), Doug Strassler (member), Dan Rubins (member), and Stanley L. Cohen (advisor).

== Categories ==
Awards are currently given in the following categories:

- Outstanding Broadway Play
- Outstanding Broadway Musical
- Outstanding Off-Broadway Play
- Outstanding Off-Broadway Musical
- Outstanding New Score
- Outstanding Revival of a Play
- Outstanding Revival of a Musical
- Outstanding Actor in a Play
- Outstanding Actress in a Play
- Outstanding Actor in a Musical
- Outstanding Actress in a Musical
- Outstanding Featured Actor in a Play
- Outstanding Featured Actress in a Play
- Outstanding Featured Actor in a Musical
- Outstanding Featured Actress in a Musical
- Outstanding Solo Performance
- Outstanding Direction of a Play
- Outstanding Direction of a Musical
- Outstanding Choreography
- Outstanding Set Design
- Outstanding Costume Design
- Outstanding Lighting Design
- Outstanding Projection Design
- Outstanding Sound Design
- Outstanding Orchestrations
- John Gassner Award (presented for an American play, preferably by a new playwright)

== Winners and nominees ==
=== 2008–2009 season ===
Billy Elliot the Musical and Shrek the Musical each received ten nominations, the most of any show. The winners were announced on May 11, 2009, with an awards dinner on May 21 at Sardi's Restaurant.

Billy Elliot the Musical won seven awards, including Outstanding New Broadway Musical, followed by Shrek the Musical with four. The award for Outstanding Actress in a Musical was a tie between Sutton Foster and Josefina Scaglione. Brian d'Arcy James won for Outstanding Actor in a Musical. Outstanding New Broadway Play was won by God of Carnage.

The John Gassner Award (presented for an American play, preferably by a new playwright) was won by Gina Gionfriddo for Becky Shaw, and the Special Achievement Award was given to the three actors who share the role of Billy Elliot, David Alvarez, Trent Kowalik and Kiril Kulish in Billy Elliot the Musical.

=== 2009–2010 season ===
Nominees for the 2009–2010 season were announced on April 26, 2010, by siblings Sutton Foster and Hunter Foster, with winners announced on May 17. Seven nominations each were received by the musical Memphis and the revival of The Royal Family, the most of any production. The Scottsboro Boys was nominated for six awards, including Best Off-Broadway musical. Shows receiving five nominations were The Addams Family, Bloody Bloody Andrew Jackson, The Orphans' Home Cycle, and Promises, Promises. Finian's Rainbow, La Cage aux Folles, Lend Me A Tenor, and Sondheim on Sondheim each received four nominations.

The Outstanding New Broadway Musical award was won by Memphis, which won a total of four awards. Other winners included: Outstanding New Broadway Play for Red and Outstanding New Off-Broadway Play for The Orphans' Home Cycle, which won two awards. The Outstanding New Off-Broadway Musical was a tie, won by Bloody Bloody Andrew Jackson and The Scottsboro Boys. La Cage aux Folles won four awards: Outstanding Revival of a Musical, Outstanding Actor In A Musical (Douglas Hodge), Director (Terry Johnson), and Costume Design (Matthew Wright). Montego Glover (Memphis) and Catherine Zeta-Jones (A Little Night Music) tied for Outstanding Actress In A Musical.

=== 2010–2011 season ===
The nominees, announced on April 26, 2011, included nine nominations for the musical Sister Act, the most of any show. Anything Goes received eight nominations. The Special Achievement Awards were also announced: Ellen Barkin, Outstanding Broadway Debut in The Normal Heart; and Adrian Kohler with Basil Jones for Handspring Puppet Company Puppet Design, Fabrication and Direction for War Horse.

The winners were:

- Outstanding New Broadway Play – War Horse
- Outstanding New Off-Broadway Play – Other Desert Cities (by Jon Robin Baitz)
- Outstanding New Off-Broadway Musical – The Kid (book by Michael Zam, music by Andy Monroe, lyrics by Jack Lechner)
- Outstanding Revival of a Musical – Anything Goes
- Outstanding Revival of a Play – The Normal Heart
- Outstanding Director of a Musical – Casey Nicholaw and Trey Parker for Book of Mormon
- Outstanding Director of a Play – Marianne Elliott and Tom Morris for War Horse
- Outstanding Choreographer – Kathleen Marshall for Anything Goes
- Outstanding Costume Design – Tim Chappel and Lizzy Gardiner for Priscilla Queen of the Desert
- Outstanding Lighting Design – Paule Constable for War Horse
- Outstanding Set Design – Neil Murray for Brief Encounter
- Outstanding Actress in a Musical – Sutton Foster
- Outstanding Actor in a Musical – Josh Gad
- Outstanding Actor in a Play – Mark Rylance
- Outstanding Actress in a Play – Nina Arianda and Frances McDormand (tie)
- Outstanding Featured Actor in a Play – Brian Bedford
- Outstanding Featured Actress in a Play – Elizabeth Rodriguez
- Outstanding Featured Actress in a Musical – Laura Benanti
- Outstanding Featured Actor in a Musical – Adam Godley

=== 2011–2012 season ===
The nominees included nine nominations for the new musical Nice Work If You Can Get It, the most of any production, with the musicals Newsies and Once each receiving seven nominations and the revival of Follies receiving five. The Public Theater received an honorary award "on its 50th anniversary presenting free theatre at the Delacorte Theater in Central Park."

Winners include One Man, Two Guvnors as Outstanding New Broadway Play, Sons of the Prophet by Stephen Karam as Outstanding New Off-Broadway Play, and Michael John LaChiusa's Queen of the Mist as Outstanding New Off-Broadway Musical. The Submission by Jeff Talbot received the John Gassner Award.

=== 2012–2013 season ===
The nominees included 11 nominations for the revival of the musical Pippin, nine nominations for Kinky Boots, eight nominations (each) for Chaplin: The Musical and Cinderella and six nominations (each) for Golden Boy and The Nance.

Winners include Vanya and Sonia and Masha and Spike as Outstanding New Broadway Play, My Name is Asher Lev as Outstanding New Off-Broadway Play and Here Lies Love as Outstanding New Off-Broadway Musical. Who's Afraid of Virginia Woolf? was named Outstanding Revival of a Play and Pippin as Outstanding Revival of a Musical. My Name is Asher Lev by Aaron Posner received the John Gassner Award. The Special Achievement Award was presented to the Irish Repertory Theatre.

=== 2013–2014 season ===
The nominees included 11 nominations for A Gentleman's Guide to Love and Murder, 8 nominations for the new musical Aladdin, and 7 nominations for the new musical Fun Home; the dramas Twelfth Night received 5 nominations, Act One 4 nominations, and All the Way 4 nominations. Winners of multiple awards were A Gentleman's Guide to Love and Murder (including New Musical) with 4; Bullets Over Broadway and The Glass Menagerie with 3 each; and All the Way (including New Play) and Hedwig and the Angry Inch with 2 each. Three plays tied for the John Glassner Award: Eric Dufault, Year of the Rooster; Madeleine George, The (Curious Case of the) Watson Intelligence; and Steven Levenson, The Unavoidable Disappearance of Tom Durnin.

=== 2014–2015 season ===
The nominees included Something Rotten! – 12, On the Twentieth Century – 9, An American in Paris – 8, Wolf Hall – 7, It Shoulda Been You – 6, The Audience – 6, The Curious Incident of the Dog in the Night-Time – 6, Hamilton – 5, The Elephant Man – 5, The King and I – 5, The Visit – 5, On The Town – 4, You Can't Take It with You – 4, The Heidi Chronicles – 3 and The Last Ship – 3.

Multiple winners: The Curious Incident of the Dog in the Night-Time (5, including Outstanding New Broadway Play), An American in Paris (3, including Outstanding New Broadway Musical), Hamilton (3, including Outstanding Off-Broadway Musical), The King and I (3), The Audience (2), On the 20th Century (2) and You Can't Take It With You (2).

The John Gassner Award winner was The Invisible Hand by Ayad Akhtar.

=== 2015–2016 season ===
The nominees included American Psycho and She Loves Me – 8; Bright Star and On Your Feet! – 7; Dear Evan Hansen – 6; Eclipsed, Lazarus, Long Day's Journey Into Night and Spring Awakening – 5; and The Humans, A View From the Bridge and Waitress – 4.

Multiple winners: She Loves Me – 4; Long Day’s Journey Into Night – 3. The Outstanding New Broadway Musical was Bright Star, and the Outstanding New Broadway Play was The Humans; Outstanding Revival of a Play was Long Day’s Journey Into Night and Outstanding Revival of a Musical was She Loves Me. The John Gassner Award winner was Marco Ramirez for The Royale.

=== 2016–2017 season ===
The nominees included Anastasia – 13; Hello, Dolly! – 10; The Band's Visit and Come from Away – 7; Groundhog Day – 5; A Bronx Tale – 4; Falsettos, Holiday Inn, and Natasha, Pierre & The Great Comet of 1812 – 3; and Miss Saigon, Sunset Boulevard – 1.

Multiple winners: Come from Away and Hello, Dolly! – 4; The Band's Visit and Natasha, Pierre & The Great Comet of 1812 – 2. The Outstanding New Broadway Musical was Come from Away, and the Outstanding New Broadway Play was Oslo; Outstanding Revival of a Play was Jitney and Outstanding Revival of a Musical was Hello, Dolly!. The John Gassner Award winner was Bess Wohl for Small Mouth Sounds.

=== 2017–2018 season ===
The nominees included SpongeBob SquarePants – 11; Harry Potter and the Cursed Child – 10; My Fair Lady – 9; Mean Girls – 8; Angels in America, Carousel, and Once on This Island – 6; Three Tall Women – 5; Frozen and Prince of Broadway – 4; Farinelli and the King and Travesties – 3.

The award winners were announced on May 7, 2018. Multiple winners are: Harry Potter and the Cursed Child with six awards, including Outstanding New Broadway Play, and My Fair Lady with five awards, including Outstanding Revival of a Musical. SpongeBob SquarePants won the Outstanding New Broadway Musical, with two additional awards. Jocelyn Bioh, for School Girls; Or, The African Mean Girls Play won the John Gassner Award.

=== 2018–2019 season ===
The Outer Critics Circle Award winners for the 2018–19 season include Hadestown (Musical), The Ferryman (Play), Girl From the North Country (Off-Broadway Musical), and White Noise (Off-Broadway Play).

=== 2019-2020 season ===
	Honorees
Outstanding New Broadway Play	Grand Horizons; The Height of the Storm; The Inheritance; Linda Vista; The Sound Inside
Outstanding New Broadway Musicals	Jagged Little Pill; Moulin Rouge!; Tina: The Tina Turner Musical
Outstanding New Off-Broadway Play	Cambodian Rock Band; Greater Clements; Halfway Bitches Go Straight to Heaven; Make Believe; Seared
Outstanding New Off-Broadway Musical	Darling Grenadine; Octet; The Secret Life of Bees; Soft Power; A Strange Loop
Outstanding Revival of a Play (Broadway or Off-Broadway)	Betrayal; Fires in the Mirror; For Colored Girls Who Have Considered Suicide/When the Rainbow is Enuf; Frankie and Johnny in the Clair de Lune; A Soldier's Play
Outstanding Revival of a Musical (Broadway or Off-Broadway)	Little Shop of Horrors; The Unsinkable Molly Brown; West Side Story
John Gassner Award	Catya McMullen, Georgia Mertching Is Dead; Will Arbery, Heroes of the Fourth Turning; Alexis Scheer, Our Dear Dead Drug Lord; Eboni Booth, Paris
Outstanding Book of a Musical (Broadway or Off-Broadway)	Diablo Cody, Jagged Little Pill; David Henry Hwang, Soft Power; Michael R. Jackson, A Strange Loop; Lynn Nottage, The Secret Life of Bees; Mark Saltzman, Romeo and Bernadette
Outstanding New Score (Broadway or Off-Broadway)	Susan Birkenhead and Duncan Sheik, The Secret Life of Bees; Ross Golan, The Wrong Man; Michael R. Jackson, A Strange Loop; Dave Malloy, Octet; Jeanine Tesori and David Henry Hwang, Soft Power
Outstanding Director of a Play	David Cromer, The Sound Inside; Stephen Daldry, The Inheritance; Kenny Leon, A Soldier’s Play; Jamie Lloyd, Betrayal; John Ortiz, Halfway Bitches Go Straight to Heaven
Outstanding Director of a Musical	Stephen Brackett, A Strange Loop; Michael Mayer, Little Shop of Horrors; Diane Paulus, Jagged Little Pill; Alex Timbers, Moulin Rouge!; Ivo van Hove, West Side Story
Outstanding Choreographer	Sidi Larbi Cherakoui, Jagged Little Pill; Raja Feather Kelly, A Strange Loop; Sonya Tayeh, Moulin Rouge!; Anthony Van Laast, Tina: The Tina Turner Musical; Travis Wall, The Wrong Man
Outstanding Orchestrations	Tom Kitt, Jagged Little Pill; Alex Lacamoire, The Wrong Man; Justin Levine, with Matt Stine, Katie Kresek, and Charlie Rosen, Moulin Rouge!; Christopher Nightingale, A Christmas Carol; Duncan Sheik and John Clancy, The Secret Life of Bees
Outstanding Actor in a Play	Ian Barford, Linda Vista; Edmund Donovan, Greater Clements; Raúl Esparza, Seared; Tom Hiddleston, Betrayal; Will Hochman, The Sound Inside; Jonathan Pryce, The Height of the Storm
Outstanding Actress in a Play	Eileen Atkins,The Height of the Storm; Judith Ivey, Greater Clements; Joaquina Kalukango, Slave Play; April Matthis, Toni Stone; Mary-Louise Parker, The Sound Inside; Portia, Stew
Outstanding Featured Actor in a Play	David Alan Grier, A Soldier’s Play; John Benjamin Hickey, The Inheritance; Paul Hilton, The Inheritance; Samuel H. Levine, The Inheritance; Andrew Morrison, Blues for an Alabama Sky; Chris Perfetti, Moscow Moscow Moscow Moscow Moscow Moscow
Outstanding Featured Actress in a Play	Liza Colón-Zayas, Halfway Bitches Go Straight to Heaven; Montego Glover, All the Natalie Portmans; Marsha Mason, Little Gem; Krysta Rodriguez, Seared; Lois Smith, The Inheritance; Jennifer Van Dyck, The Confession of Lily Dare
Outstanding Solo Performance	David Cale, We’re Only Alive For a Short Amount of Time; Laura Linney, My Name Is Lucy Barton; Aedin Moloney, Yes! Reflections of Molly Bloom; Deirdre O’Connell, Dana H.; Michael Benjamin Washington, Fires in the Mirror
Outstanding Actor in a Musical	Jonathan Groff, Little Shop of Horrors; Joshua Henry, The Wrong Man; Adam Kantor, Darling Grenadine; Larry Owens, A Strange Loop; Isaac Powell, West Side Story; Aaron Tveit, Moulin Rouge!
Outstanding Actress in a Musical	Beth Malone, The Unsinkable Molly Brown; Janelle McDermoth, We’re Gonna Die; Karen Olivo, Moulin Rouge!; Shereen Pimentel, West Side Story; Elizabeth Stanley, Jagged Little Pill; Adrienne Warren, Tina: The Tina Turner Musical
Outstanding Featured Actor in a Musical	Christian Borle, Little Shop of Horrors; Danny Burstein, Moulin Rouge!; Gus Halper, Sing Street; Jay Armstrong Johnson, Scotland, PA; Francis Jue, Soft Power; Daniel J. Watts, Tina: The Tina Turner Musical
Outstanding Featured Actress in a Musical	Eisa Davis, The Secret Life of Bees; Kathryn Gallagher, Jagged Little Pill; LaChanze, The Secret Life of Bees; Judy McLane, Romeo & Bernadette; Lauren Patten, Jagged Little Pill; Saycon Sengbloh, The Secret Life of Bees
Outstanding Scenic Design	Rob Howell, A Christmas Carol; Tim Mackabee, Seared; Derek McLane, Moulin Rouge!; Clint Ramos, Grand Horizons; Anthony Ward, The Height of the Storm
Outstanding Costume Design	Vanessa Leuck, Emojiland; Jeff Mahshie, Bob & Carol & Ted & Alice; Mark Thompson, Tina: The Tina Turner Musical; Rachel Townsend & Jessica Jahn, The Confession of Lily Dare; Catherine Zuber, Moulin Rouge!
Outstanding Lighting Design	Isabella Byrd, Heroes of the Fourth Turning; Heather Gilbert, The Sound Inside; Justin Townsend, Moulin Rouge!; Hugh Vanstone, A Christmas Carol; Hugh Vanstone, The Height of the Storm
Outstanding Projection Design	Luke Halls, West Side Story; Brad Peterson, Broadway Bounty Hunter; Lisa Renkel and Possible Productions, Emojiland; Aaron Rhyne, The Sound Inside; Hannah Wasileski, Fires in the Mirror
Outstanding Sound Design	Simon Baker, A Christmas Carol; Mikhail Fiksel, Dana H.; Peter Hylenski, Moulin Rouge!; Lee Kinney and Sanae Yamada, Is This A Room; Daniel Kluger, The Sound Inside

== See also ==
- Obie Awards
- Tony Awards
- Drama Desk Awards
- Drama League Award
- New York Drama Critics' Circle
