= Harrison David Rivers =

American playwright (born 1981)

- Born: Harrison David Rivers; September 11, 1981 (age 45); Manhattan, Kansas, US
- Education: Columbia University School of the Arts; Kenyon College
- Occupation: Playwright

Harrison David Rivers (born September 11, 1981) is an American playwright. Rivers' work has won him the Relentless Award, a GLAAD Media Award, a McKnight Fellowship for Playwrights, a Jerome Foundation Many Voices Fellowship, an Emerging Artist of Color Fellowship, a Van Lier Fellowship and the New York Stage & Film's Founders Award. He is based in Saint Paul, Minnesota and is married to Christopher Bineham.

== Life and career ==
Rivers was born in Manhattan, Kansas. He attended Manhattan High School, where he was active in the music and theater programs. He earned a B.A. in American Studies and Dance & Drama from Kenyon College in Gambier, Ohio (2004) and an M.F.A in Playwriting from the Columbia University School of Arts in New York City (2009), where he received the John Golden Playwriting Award.

While still a student at Columbia, Rivers was selected to participate in the inaugural "24 Hour Plays: Old Vic New Voices" event at the Atlantic Theatre. He also wrote a short play for The 24 Hour Plays on Broadway (2009) called "And It Seems To Me A Very Good Sign". His cast included Sam Rockwell, Naomi Watts, John Krasinski and Amber Tamblyn.

After graduation, Rivers received an Emerging Artist of Color Fellowship from New York Theatre Workshop and a Van Lier Fellowship from New Dramatists.

Rivers was a member of P73's Interstate 73 Writers' Group and the Emerging Writers Group at the Public Theater (2011–13).

Rivers' play "When Last We Flew" was selected for the Sundance Theatre Lab in 2010. The play went on to be produced in the New York International Fringe Festival where it won awards for Outstanding Play and Outstanding Performance (for Rory Lipede). The play was invited to be a part of the Fringe Encore Series. "When Last We Flew" also won the 2011 GLAAD Media Award for Outstanding New York Theatre: Off Off Broadway.

The Movement Theatre Company presented Rivers' play Look Upon Our Lowliness, directed by David Mendizábal, at the Harlem School for the Arts Theatre, in April 2013. It was subsequently developed at New York Theatre Workshop's Dartmouth residency in the summer of 2019.

In 2014, Rivers was awarded a Jerome Many Voices Fellowship from the Playwrights' Center and relocated to Minneapolis, Minnesota. He subsequently received a McKnight Fellowship for Playwrights (2015–16) and was a Core Writer at the Playwrights' Center from 2016 to 2019. He currently serves on the Playwrights' Center's board of directors.

Rivers received New York Stage & Film's 2015 Founder's Award and, in 2016, he was the Playwright-in-Residence at the Williamstown Theatre Festival.

In 2017, Rivers' play Sweet from National Black Theatre received four nominations at the 45th AUDELCO Awards including: Dramatic Production of the Year, Outstanding Ensemble Performance, Director/Dramatic Production and Playwright. The 45th annual Vivian Robinson AUDELCO Awards recognizes excellence in Black Theatre.

His play Where Storms are Born, produced by the Williamstown Theatre Festival in 2017, won an Edgerton Foundation New Play Award (2017) and was nominated for Outstanding New Play at the 2017 Berkshire Theatre Awards.

Also in 2017, Rivers' play This Bitter Earth premiered at New Conservatory Theatre Center in San Francisco. In 2018, it was produced at Penumbra Theater in Saint Paul, where it won a MN Theater Award for Exceptional New Work and a Lavender Magazine award for Outstanding New Playwriting, and at About Face Theatre in Chicago, where it was a Jeff Award Recommended Show. It was subsequently produced at Washington, D.C.'s Theater Alliance in 2020.

Rivers also wrote the book for the musical Five Points, with lyrics by Douglas Lyons and music by Douglas Lyons and Ethan Pakchar, which received its world premiere at Theater Latté Da, in Minneapolis, in 2018. The extended, sold-out production received a MN Theater Award for Exceptional New Work and the BroadwayWorld Minneapolis Award for Outstanding Original/New Work, as well as Lavender Magazine awards for Best New Musical Score and Lyrics and Outstanding New Playwriting (for Rivers' book) and was included on MinnPost's year-end Best Of list for 2018. In 2019, Tony Award-winning choreographer Andy Blankenbuehler joined the creative team as the show's director and choreographer. Blankenbuehler directed a sold-out concert staging of the show at Feinstein's/54 Below in New York City on September 16, 2019.

Rivers' play the bandaged place won the 2018 Relentless Award, a prize created in honor of the late actor Philip Seymour Hoffman, and was part of New York Stage & Film's 2019 Powerhouse season at Vassar College.

During the 2018–19 school year, Rivers was a Visiting assistant professor of drama at Kenyon College.

In May and June 2019, Rivers' play To Let Go & Fall received its world premiere production at Theater Latté Da.

Rivers wrote the libretto for the second part of the musical Broadbend, Arkansas. The libretto for the first part of the show is by Ellen Fitzhugh and music & additional lyrics were written by Ted Shen. The show received its world premiere in the fall of 2019 at The Duke on 42nd Street in New York City in a co-production of Transport Group and the Public Theater. The production appeared on Times Square Chronicles' and The Broadway Blog's "Best of 2019" lists, was named one of NewNowNext's "5 New Musicals in NYC to Be Thankful For", and was designated by AMNY as an "Off-Broadway show worth seeing". It was nominated for three Antonyo Awards (Danyel Fulton for Best Actor in a Musical Off-Broadway, Shen for Best Score and Rivers for Best Book), and was cited by Times Square Chronicles for Best New Off-Broadway Musical, Outstanding Book of a Musical, Outstanding Score, and Best Orchestrations. It streamed online during the summer of 2020.

Rivers was the 2019–2020 Rudolph William Rosati Visiting Writer at Duke University.

In May 2020, Theater Latté Da announced that Rivers would work on two projects as part of its Next Up laboratory series being held in lieu of a 2020–21 season. Rivers and composer Ted Shen were commissioned to write a third part to their musical Broadbend, Arkansas, and Rivers was commissioned to work on "a new piece about the Great Mississippi Flood of 1927 alongside the 1927 premiere of the Jerome Kern, Oscar Hammerstein and Edna Ferber's musical, Showboat".

In the fall of 2020, Rivers was a Visiting assistant professor of Theater at Macalester College.

An then-untitled project was part of Theaterworks Hartford's 2020–21 season, and Rivers is under commission to write plays for Yale Repertory Theatre, Penumbra Theatre, History Theatre, Trademark Theater, and the Williamstown Theatre Festival.

His 2023 work the bandaged place was shortlisted for the 2024 Lambda Literary Award for Drama.

== Works ==
=== Plays ===
- the bandaged place (New York Stage & Film)
- To Let Go & Fall (Theater Latté Da)
- This Bitter Earth (Penumbra Theatre, New Conservatory Theatre, About Face Theatre)
- Only You Can Prevent Wildfires (Ricochet Collective)
- A Crack in the Sky [with Ahmed Ismail Yusef] (History Theatre)
- Where Storms are Born (Williamstown Theatre Festival)
- And She Would Stand Like This (The Movement Theatre Company)
- Sweet (National Black Theatre)
- And All the Dead Lie Down (convergence-continuum)
- Look Upon Our Lowliness (with David Mendizábal) (The Movement Theatre Company)
- When Last We Flew (TheatreLAB, Diversionary, NYFringe)

=== Musicals ===
- Broadbend, Arkansas [with Ellen Fitzhugh and Ted Shen] (Transport Group/Public Theater
- Five Points [with Douglas Lyons and Ethan Pakchar] (Theater Latté Da)

=== Unproduced projects ===
- The Sea & The Stars (Ruth Easton New Play Series, 2017)
- The Salvagers
- The Last Queen of Canaan [with Rebekah Melocik and Jacob Yandura] (NAMT Festival of New Musicals)
- Just One [with Ellen Fitzhugh and Ted Shen]

== Personal life ==
He is married to a man.

== Awards and honors ==
- 2020 Siena Art Institute Residency
- 2020 Bogliasco Residency
- 2020 Rudolph William Rosati Visiting Writer Fellowship at Duke University
- 2018 Relentless Award
- 2017 Edgerton Foundation New Play Award
- 2016-19 Core Writer
- 2015-16 McKnight Fellowship for Playwrights
- 2015 Founder's Award
- 2014-15 Jerome Many Voices Fellowship
- 2013 Global Age Project Winner
- 2011 GLAAD Media Award for Outstanding New York Theater: Off Off Broadway
- 2011 New York International Fringe Festival Excellence in Playwriting Award
- 2011 Queer | Art | Mentorship
- 2010-12 Van Lier Fellowship
- 2009 Montblanc Young Writers Competition Winner
- 2009-10 Emerging Artist of Color Fellowship
- 2009 John Golden Playwriting Award

== Bibliography ==
- "Harrison David Rivers". pwcenter.org. Playwrights' Center.
- Harrison David Rivers. "Harrison David Rivers | Playwright".
- Ngugi, Fredrick (17 October 2016). "Interview: Harrison David Rivers Discusses What Inspired Him to Write Plays". Face2FaceAfrica, Babu Global.
- "6 Theatre Workers You Should Know". American Theatre, Theatre Communication Group. 10 July 2017.
- Walker, Brittney M. (20 November 2016). "'Sweet' on Stage Lives Up to Its Name". Lee Bailey's Eurweb Electronic Urban Report. Archived from the original on 1 December 2017.
- Herman, Donna (24 October 2016). "Sweet". The Front Row Center.
- "ArtsinColor". YouTube. 24 April 2013.
- "Nominations announced for 45th AUDELCO Awards". New York Amsterdam News: The new Black view. 19 October 2017.
- "Harrison David Rivers". New Play Exchange.
