= Kathryn Gallagher =

American actress and singer (born 1993)

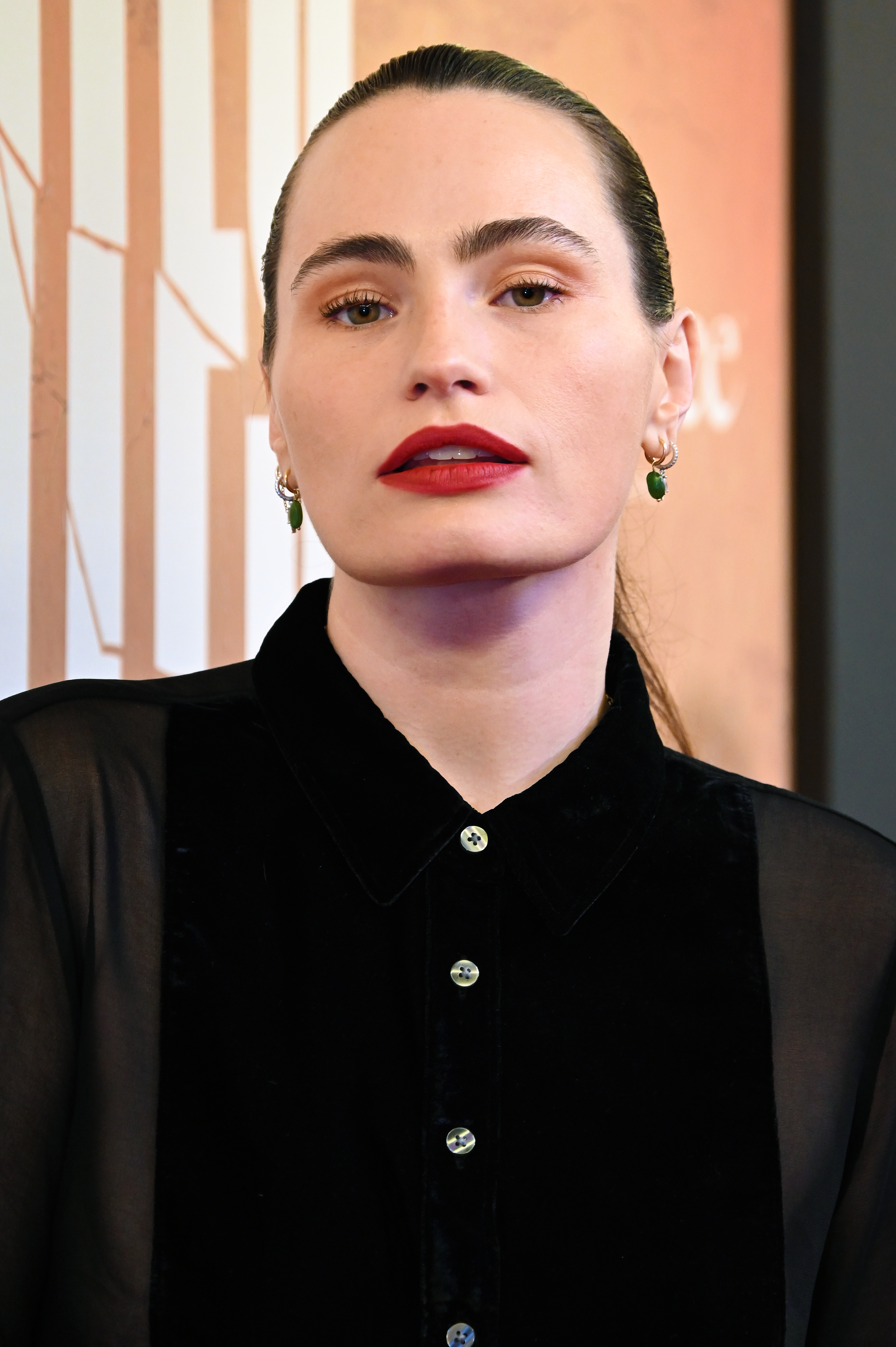
- Gallagher in 2025
- Born: July 23, 1993 (age 33); New York City, U.S.
- Education: USC Thornton School of Music
- Occupations: Singer; actress
- Years active: 2014–present
- Relatives: Peter Gallagher (father)

Kathryn Gallagher (born July 23, 1993) is an American singer and actress best known for her portrayal of Bella Fox in the Broadway musical Jagged Little Pill, for which she received a Grammy Award for Best Musical Theater Album and a nomination for the Tony Award for Best Featured Actress in a Musical.

== Early life and education ==
Gallagher was born in New York, daughter of actor Peter Gallagher and Paula Harwood. She moved to Los Angeles at 11 years old, where she began to study theater at the Adderley School. She also began writing her music when she was in middle school.

She attended University of Southern California's Thornton School of Music.

== Career ==
Gallagher's song "Nothing Ever None" was featured on the soundtrack for the 2011 film Someday This Pain Will Be Useful to You, and her song "Damaged" appears on the 2012 film Thanks for Sharing's soundtrack. Gallagher has released four solo EPs of her original music. She released her debut EP, I'm Fine, in 2014 and her second, American Spirit, in 2015. She released three singles in 2019 and 2020. In 2020, Gallagher released her third and fourth EPs, Demos, Vol. 1 and Demos, Vol. 2, which she produced by herself in her family house in the woods of Connecticut during the COVID-19 pandemic. Gallagher has done many live shows where she performs her music in Los Angeles and New York City.

Gallagher made her Broadway debut as the Voice of Martha in Deaf West Theatre's 2015 Broadway revival of Spring Awakening, also serving as the show's dance captain. She auditioned for the part after a suggestion from fellow theatre actor Ben Platt.

Gallagher has done several television projects, her most notable role being Annika in the Lifetime series You, in which she appeared in eight episodes of Season One. Gallagher also guest starred on The Flash and Indoor Boys.

In 2019, Gallagher joined the cast of Jagged Little Pill on Broadway in the role of Bella Fox. She was an original Broadway cast member. The Daily Beast's review of the show said Gallagher was "excellent in a truly tough part", while Deadline Hollywood noted that she "brings the focus of the many-issued musical to its most powerful note". In the show, she sings an original Alanis Morissette song, "Predator" that was created for the musical when Gallagher's part was upgraded from a featured ensemble role to a principal role. On October 15, 2020, Gallagher was nominated for the Tony Award for Best Featured Actress in a Musical, her first Tony nomination. The show began previews on Broadway in November 2019, opened on December 5, 2019, and closed on December 17, 2021, due to the pandemic.

== Acting credits ==
=== Film ===
Year	Title	Role	Notes
2014	Happy Pills	Clare	Short
2023	Parachute	Gwen	
2023	Woman of the Hour	Charlie	
2024	Pavements	Loretta	
2025	Ordinary Girl in a Tiara	Philippa Levreaux	Television film
TBA	Rest and Relaxation	TBA	Post-production

=== Television ===
Year	Title	Role	Notes
2018, 2025	You	Annika Attwater	9 episodes
2019	The Flash	Lia	Episode: "Godspeed"
2019	Indoor Boys	Matilda	Episode: "Soup"
2020	Acting for a Cause	Friar Lawrence	Episode: "Romeo and Juliet"
2020	Boy•Friends	Mildred	Web series; recurring role
2021	Blue Bloods	Diane Butler	Episode: "More Than Meets the Eye"
2021	Modern Love	Whitney	Episode: "How Do You Remember Me?"
2021–2023	Gossip Girl	Heidi Bergmann	5 episodes

=== Theater ===
Year(s)	Production	Role	Location	Ref.
2014	Spring Awakening	Voice of Martha; Guitar; Dance Captain	Inner City Arts, Regional	
2015	Spring Awakening	Voice of Martha; Guitar; Dance Captain	Wallis Annenberg Center for the Performing Arts, Regional	
2015	Spring Awakening	Voice of Martha; Guitar; Dance Captain	Brooks Atkinson Theatre, Broadway (debut)	
2016	Dust Can't Kill Me	Lily	New York Musical Theatre Festival, Off-Broadway	
2018	Jagged Little Pill	Bella Fox	American Repertory Theater	
2019–2021	Jagged Little Pill	Bella Fox	Broadhurst Theatre, Broadway	
2025	All Nighter	Jacqueline	The Newman Mills Theater, Off-Broadway	

=== Music video ===
Year	Title	Artist
2020	"Stay Next to Me"	Quinn XCII and Chelsea Cutler

== Discography ==
=== Extended plays ===
Title	Details
How Do I Grow Up	Released: July 25, 2012; Label: Self-released; Format: Digital download, streaming
American Spirit	Released: September 5, 2013; Label: Self-released; Format: Digital download, streaming
I'm Fine	Released: 2014; Label: Self-released; Format: Digital download, streaming
Demos, Vol. 1	Released: May 15, 2020; Label: Self-released; Format: Digital download, streaming
Demos, Vol. 2	Released: July 24, 2020; Label: Self-released; Format: Digital download, streaming

=== Singles ===
Song	Year	Album
"I'll Be Known" (with Erik Scott Smith)	2012	Erik Scott Smith & The Paper Heart Band
"Mess of a Machine" (with John O'Callaghan)	2012	Non-album single
"Damaged"	2012	Thanks for Sharing (Original Motion Picture Soundtrack)
"Nothing Ever Done"	2012	Someday This Pain Will Be Useful to You
"Father"	2017	We Love You, Sally Carmichael! Official Motion Picture Soundtrack
"Bad News"	2019	Non-album single
"Whistler"	2019	Non-album single
"I'll Get the Coffee"	2020	Non-album single
"If I Ain't Got You (Live)" (with Nick Cordero)	2020	Live Your Life (Live at Feinstein's/54 Below)
"Crosslegged in the Kitchen"	2020	Non-album single
"Nostalgic for the Moment"	2020	Non-album single

=== Cast album appearances ===
- Jagged Little Pill (Original Broadway Cast Recording) (2019)

=== Songwriting credits ===
- "Wanna Wear a Dress" by Harper Grae (2019)

== Awards and nominations ==
Year	Award	Category	Work	Result	Ref.
2015	Ovation Award	Acting Ensemble of a Musical	Spring Awakening	Won	
2016	Astaire Award	Outstanding Ensemble in a Broadway Show	Spring Awakening	Nominated	
2016	New York Musical Theatre Festival Award	Outstanding Ensemble	Dust Can't Kill Me	Won	
2020	Tony Award	Best Featured Actress in a Musical	Jagged Little Pill	Nominated	
2020	Outer Critics Circle Award	Outstanding Featured Actress in a Musical	Jagged Little Pill	Honoree	
2021	Grammy Award	Best Musical Theater Album	Jagged Little Pill	Won	
