= Lauren Patten =

American actor and singer (born 1992)

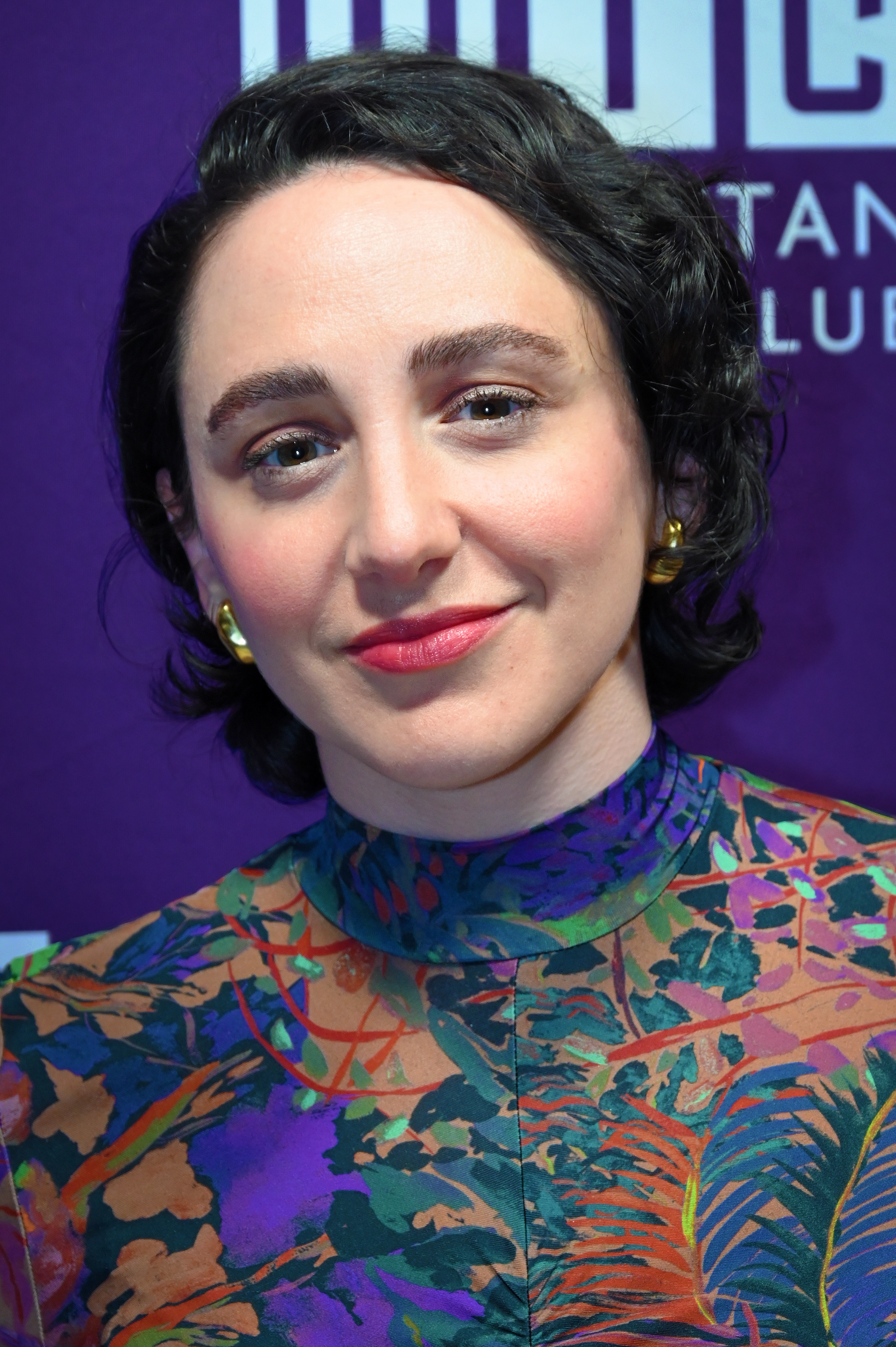
- Patten in 2026
- Born: Lauren Marie Patten; September 22, 1992 (age 34); Downers Grove, Illinois, U.S.
- Occupations: Actress, singer
- Years active: 2007–present

Lauren Marie Patten (born September 22, 1992) is an American actress, singer, and writer best known for originating the role of Jo in the Broadway musical Jagged Little Pill, as well as playing Officer Rachel Witten in the crime series Blue Bloods. For her performance in Jagged Little Pill, Patten won the Tony Award for Best Featured Actress in a Musical.

== Early life and education ==
Patten grew up in Downers Grove, Illinois. She started acting at four, and because of this early start to her career, started homeschooling in seventh grade.

Patten briefly attended New York University and University of Southern California before graduating from The New School with a BA in Creative Writing.

Patten came out as bisexual and queer in 2018.

== Career ==
Patten started doing commercials at age four and began to perform in community theatre soon afterwards. She made her professional theatre debut when she was 12-years-old, in the Goodman Theatre's production of A Christmas Carol. At age 14, she moved to Los Angeles to participate in the Rubicon Theatre's production of A Diary of Anne Frank as the title character. Patten participated in many productions at the Rubicon, and she was nominated for a 2008 Los Angeles Stage Alliance Ovation Award for Best Featured Actress in a Play for her portrayal of Elma in Bus Stop. Patten also won a Santa Barbara Independent Award for her performance as Emily in Our Town. Patten participated in Deaf West's production of Spring Awakening as Ilse. She also portrayed Trashley in the original rock musical Home Street Home by Fat Mike of NOFX.

In 2015, Patten moved to New York City to appear in the original Broadway cast of Fun Home as the cover for Medium Alison and Joan. In 2016, Patten was the captain for Fun Home's team for the Broadway Bowling League, "The Bowl Dykes". On February 2, 2016, Patten took over the role of Medium Alison while original actor Emily Skeggs was away doing a television project until May 22, 2016. Patten then covered Medium Alison and Joan until her final performance on June 19, 2016.

In 2017, Patten played the team captain, #25, in Sarah DeLappe's play, The Wolves about a soccer team of suburban teenage girls. Patten won two awards as part of the ensemble, an Obie Award for Ensemble Performance, and a Drama Desk Award for Outstanding Ensemble. Later in 2017, Patten was the lead in the New York Musical Festival's production of The Goree All-Girl String Band where she played Reable Childs.

Patten originated the role of Jo in the Alanis Morissette jukebox musical Jagged Little Pill in the 2017 reading, and continued in the role in the original production at the American Repertory Theater in 2018. Patten won an IRNE Award for Best Supporting Actress in a large stage musical and was nominated for the 2019 Elliot Norton Award for Best Musical Performance by an Actress for her performance. Later in 2018, Patten played Jenny in Steven Levenson's play, Days of Rage at Second Stage Theatre. In the fall of 2019, Patten reprised her role of Jo in Jagged Little Pill on Broadway at the Broadhurst Theatre, where she has received critical praise, especially for her performance of "You Oughta Know". In 2020, for her portrayal of Jo she won both a Drama Desk Award for Outstanding Featured Actress in a Musical and a Tony Award for Best Featured Actress in a Musical.

Patten has been a guest star on various television programs. Some of her major credits include the recurring roles of Officer Rachel Witten on the show Blue Bloods and Polly Dean on Season 3 of The Good Fight. Other television credits include being in the guest cast for shows such as Arrested Development, Switched at Birth, and Succession.

Patten has done two concerts with her band, whose members include Damien Bassman, Eric B. Davis, and Marc Schmied. Their first performance was at Rockwood Music Hall on August 5, 2019, and her second was at The Bitter End on October 13, 2019.

In 2024, Patten stars as "Anna" in Death and Other Details on Hulu.

== Acting credits ==
=== Film ===
Year	Title	Role	Notes
2017	The Big Sick	Party Goer 2	
2020	Estella Scrooge: A Christmas Carol with a Twist	Dawkins	Online release
TBA	Old Mission		Post-production

=== Television ===
Year	Title	Role	Notes
2013	Arrested Development	High School Girl #2	Guest cast: "Señoritis"
2013	Awkward	Nerdy Girl	Guest cast: "Who I Want to Be"
2015	Switched at Birth	Serena	Guest star: "Lock the Door Upon Myself"
2018–2021, 2023–2024	Blue Bloods	Officer Rachel Witten	Recurring; seasons 8–12; Guest; seasons 13–14
2018	Succession	Angela	Guest star: "Prague"
2019	The Good Fight	Polly Dean	Recurring; season 3
2024	Death and Other Details	Anna Collier	Series regular
2025	FBI	Josie DiArmas	Season 7 Episode 16: Covered
2026	Off Campus	Joanna Maxwell	Season 1 Episode 7: The Faceoff

=== Theatre ===
Year	Title	Role	Theatre	Notes
2007	The Diary of Anne Frank	Anne Frank	Rubicon Theatre	
2008	Bus Stop	Elma Duckworth	Rubicon Theatre	
2013	Our Town	Emily Webb	Rubicon Theatre	
2014	Deaf West's Spring Awakening	Ilse	Rosenthal Theater	
2015	Home Street Home	Trashley	Z Space	
2015–2016	Fun Home	Medium Alison/Joan Understudy	Circle in the Square Theatre	Broadway debut
2016	Fun Home	Medium Alison	Circle in the Square Theatre	Temporary replacement (February 2-May 22, 2016)
2016	The Wolves	#25	The Duke on 42nd Street	
2017	The Goree All-Girl String Band	Reable Childs	New York Musical Festival	
2018	Days of Rage	Jenny	Second Stage Theater	
2018	Jagged Little Pill	Joanne "Jo" Taylor	American Repertory Theatre	
2019–2021	Jagged Little Pill	Joanne "Jo" Taylor	Broadhurst Theatre	
2024	The Lonely Few	Lila	MCC Theater	
2025	The Counterfeit Opera	Jenny Diver	The Amph at Little Island	
2026	Becky Shaw	Suzanna Slater	Hayes Theater	

== Awards and nominations ==
Year	Award	Category	Work	Result
2008	Ovation Award	Featured Actress in a Play	Bus Stop	Nominated
2013	Santa Barbara Independent Theatre Award	Performance	Our Town	Won
2017	Drama Desk Award	Outstanding Ensemble	The Wolves	Won
2017	Obie Award	Ensemble	The Wolves	Won
2019	Elliot Norton Award	Outstanding Musical Performance by an Actress	Jagged Little Pill	Nominated
2019	IRNE Award	Best Supporting Actress in a Musical (Large Stage)	Jagged Little Pill	Won
2020	Tony Award	Best Featured Actress in a Musical	Jagged Little Pill	Won
2020	Drama Desk Award	Outstanding Featured Actress in a Musical	Jagged Little Pill	Won
2020	Drama League Award	Distinguished Performance	Jagged Little Pill	Nominated
2020	Outer Critics Circle Award	Outstanding Featured Actress in a Musical	Jagged Little Pill	Honouree
2021	Grammy Award	Best Musical Theater Album	Jagged Little Pill	Won
