= Elizabeth Stanley (actress) =

American stage actor and singer (born 1978)

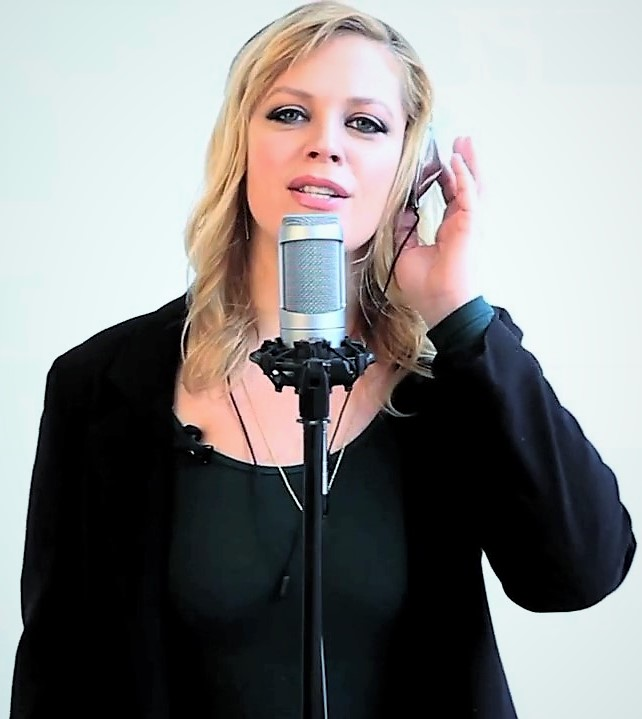
- Stanley singing in the "Make It Fair" video, 2015
- Born: December 10, 1978 (age 47); Cedar Rapids, Iowa, U.S.
- Education: Indiana University, Bloomington (BM)
- Occupations: Actor, singer
- Years active: 2006–present
- Children: 1

Elizabeth Stanley (born December 10, 1978) is an American stage actor and singer. She has originated a number of main and featured roles in Broadway musicals, including Allison in Cry-Baby and Dyanne in Million Dollar Quartet. In 2020, Stanley was nominated for a Tony Award for Best Actress in a Musical for her portrayal of Mary Jane Healy in Jagged Little Pill.

== Early life ==
Stanley was born in Cedar Rapids and grew up in Denison, Iowa and Camp Point, Illinois. As a youth, she trained at Interlochen Center for the Arts. She graduated from the Jacobs School of Music at Indiana University, Bloomington in 2001 as a voice major.

== Career ==
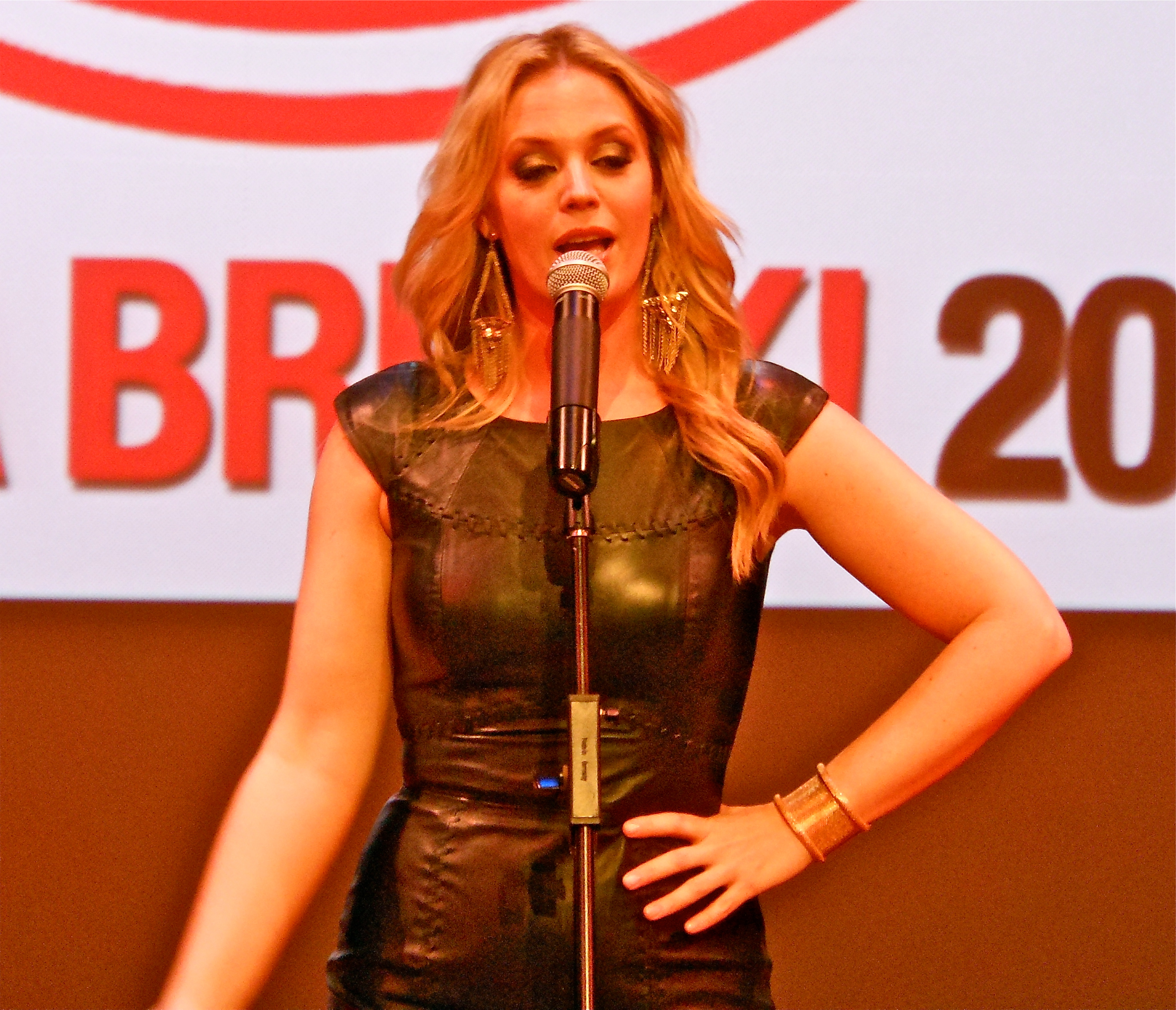
Stanley performing at The Transport Group's "Gimme a Break!" Gala in 2012.

Stanley made her Broadway debut as April in the 2006 revival of Stephen Sondheim's Company. In 2008, she originated the role of Allison in Cry-Baby, a musical adaption of the film of the same name. The following year, she starred as Clio in the first national tour of Xanadu. In 2010, she originated the role of Dyanne in the Broadway production of Million Dollar Quartet.

In 2014, she played Claire de Loone in the Broadway revival of On the Town. For this role, she was nominated for a Drama Desk Award for Outstanding Featured Actress in a Musical. In 2015, she starred as Francesca in the national tour of The Bridges of Madison County.

Stanley originated the role of Mary Jane Healy in the American Repertory Theater production of Jagged Little Pill, a musical based on Alanis Morissette's album of the same name. For this role, she was nominated for an Independent Reviewers of New England (IRNE) Award and the Boston Theater Critics Association's Elliot Norton Award. In 2019, she reprised the role for the Broadway production. This role earned her nominations for the 2020 Drama Desk Award for Outstanding Actress in a Musical and the 2020 Tony Award for Best Actress in a Musical. In 2022, Stanley, Nikki Renee Daniels, Jeff Kready, and Tamar Greene performed renditions of songs from the satirical animated series South Park with a 30-piece orchestra, celebrating the show’s 25th anniversary. Arranged by Broadway orchestrator Stephen Oremus, the orchestral versions included tracks such as "Gay Fish" and the show's theme song.

In 2026, Stanley starred Off-Broadway in the new play Disruption by Andrew Stein, at the Pershing Square Signature Center.

== Personal life ==
She is engaged to Charlie Murphy. She announced that she was pregnant with their first child on April 10, 2021. Her daughter, Solveig Stanley Murphy was born August 19, 2021.

== Theatre credits ==
Year	Title	Role	Theatre	Notes
2006	Company	April	Cincinnati Playhouse in the Park	Regional
2006–07	Company	April	Ethel Barrymore Theatre	Broadway
2007	Cry-Baby	Allison	La Jolla Playhouse	Regional
2008	Cry-Baby	Allison	Marquis Theatre	Broadway
2009–10	Xanadu	Clio / Kira		US National Tour
2010–11	Million Dollar Quartet	Dyanne	Nederlander Theatre	Broadway
2014–15	On the Town	Claire de Loone	Lyric Theatre	Broadway
2015–16	The Bridges of Madison County	Francesca Johnson		US National Tour
2018	Jagged Little Pill	Mary Jane Healy	American Repertory Theater	Regional
2019–21	Jagged Little Pill	Mary Jane Healy	Broadhurst Theatre	Broadway
2023	Ragtime	Mother	Tanglewood	Regional
2026	Jane Eyre	Bertha Mason / Miss Scatcherd	David Geffen Hall	Concert
2026	Disruption	Jill	Pershing Square Signature Center	Off-Broadway

== Filmography ==
=== Film ===
Year	Title	Role	Notes
2026	Disclosure Day	KCXE Anchor	

=== Television ===
Year	Title	Role	Notes
2007	Great Performances	April	Episode: "Company: A Musical Comedy"
2008	Fringe	Stacey	Episode: "The Same Old Story"
2012	Made in Jersey	Phebe Larkin	Episode: "Ancient History"
2013	All My Children	Mother	3 episodes
2013	Think Tank	Margot	5 episodes
2014	Black Box	Jennifer Redmond	Episode: "Emotion"
2014	My Day	Flynn's Mom	
2015	The Affair	Cynthia Rainer	Episode: "Episode #2.7"
2017	The Get Down	Shirley	Episode: "Only from Exile Can We Come Home"
2019	FBI	Linda McCann	Episode: "Exposed"
2019	NOS4A2	Sharon Smith	2 episodes
2021	Blue Bloods	Karen	Episode: "The Common Good"
2021	New Amsterdam	Julie	Episode: "Things Fall Apart"
2021	Younger	Elizabeth Holmes	Episode: "Older"
2022	Cars on the Road	Truck (voice)	Episode: "Trucks"

== Honors and awards ==
Year	Work	Award	Category	Result
2014	On the Town	Drama Desk Award	Outstanding Featured Actress in a Musical	Nominated
2019	Jagged Little Pill	Elliot Norton Awards	Outstanding Musical Performance by an Actress	Nominated
2019	Jagged Little Pill	IRNE Awards	Large Theatre: Best Actress in a Musical	Nominated
2020	Jagged Little Pill	Outer Critics Circle Award	Outstanding Actress in a Musical	Honoree
2020	Jagged Little Pill	Drama Desk Awards	Outstanding Actress in a Musical	Nominated
2020	Jagged Little Pill	Tony Award	Best Actress in a Musical	Nominated
2020	Jagged Little Pill	Grammy Awards	Best Musical Theater Album	Won
