= Jagged Little Pill (musical) =

2018 rock musical

- Original Broadway Promotional Poster
- Music: Alanis Morissette; Glen Ballard; Michael Farrell (additional music); Guy Sigsworth (additional music)
- Lyrics: Alanis Morissette
- Book: Diablo Cody
- Basis: Jagged Little Pill by Alanis Morissette
- Premiere: May 5, 2018: American Repertory Theater, Cambridge, Massachusetts
- Productions: 2018 Cambridge; 2019 Broadway; 2021 Australian Tour; 2022 US Tour
- Awards: Tony Award for Best Book of a Musical; Grammy Award for Best Musical Theater Album

Jagged Little Pill is a jukebox musical with music by Alanis Morissette and Glen Ballard, lyrics by Morissette, and book by Diablo Cody, with additional music by Michael Farrell and Guy Sigsworth. The musical is inspired by the 1995 album of the same name by Morissette and deals with pain, healing, and empowerment. It premiered at the American Repertory Theater in Cambridge, Massachusetts, on May 5, 2018, directed by Diane Paulus.

The show began previews on Broadway in November 2019, but closed due to the COVID-19 pandemic. It reopened on October 21, 2021, and closed on December 17, 2021. For the 74th Tony Awards, Jagged Little Pill won two awards on 15 nominations, the most nominations of any show of the 2019–20 season. It also won the Grammy Award for Best Musical Theater Album.

== Background ==
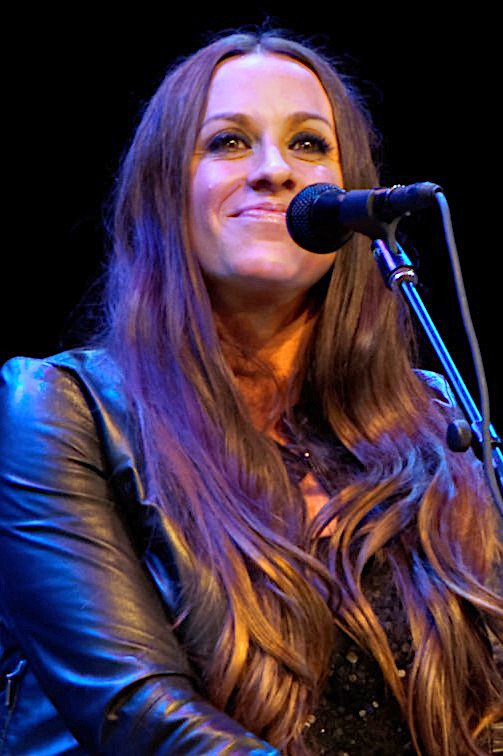
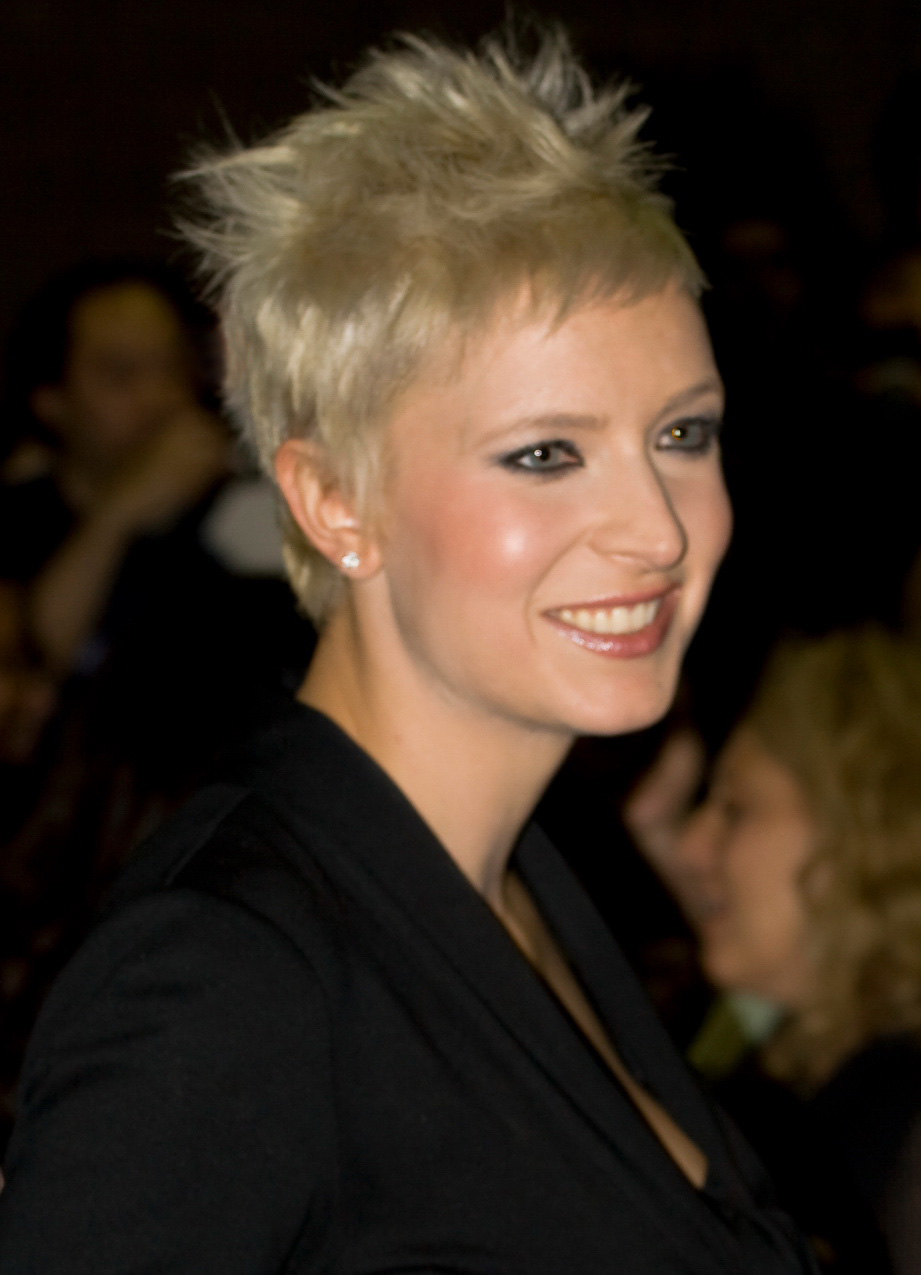
Co-composer and lyricist Alanis Morissette and book by Diablo Cody.

In November 2013, it was revealed that a musical version of the album Jagged Little Pill by Alanis Morissette was being adapted for the stage with composer Tom Kitt attached to pen new arrangements and orchestrations for the production. A first workshop was expected to take place in 2014, but in 2015 Morissette revealed that the show was still in early stages and had yet to be written. In May 2017, it was announced that the musical would receive its world premiere in May 2018, 23 years after the album came out. A reading took place in 2017, with Idina Menzel as Mary Jane. The first public performance of songs from the show took place in March 2018 at the American Repertory Theater Gala.

The show has a book by Diablo Cody, with direction by Diane Paulus, choreography by Sidi Larbi Cherkaoui, set design by Riccardo Hernandez, costume design by Emily Rebholz, lighting design by Justin Townsend, and video design by Finn Ross. Music and lyrics are by Alanis Morissette and Glen Ballard, with musical direction by Bryan Perri, sound design by Jonathan Deans, and orchestrations by Tom Kitt. In addition to music from the show's namesake album, the musical also features other songs from Morissette's catalog, including "Thank U", "That I Would Be Good", and "So Pure" from 1998's Supposed Former Infatuation Junkie, "So Unsexy" and "Hands Clean" from 2002's Under Rug Swept, "Unprodigal Daughter" from 2002's Feast on Scraps, "No" from the Japanese edition of 2012's Havoc and Bright Lights, and "Uninvited" from the soundtrack of the 1998 film City of Angels. Alanis also wrote two new songs for the musical, "Smiling" and "Predator", with the former included as the second single on her ninth studio album, Such Pretty Forks in the Road.

== Synopsis ==
Setting: Connecticut

=== Act I ===
This musical tells the story of how the Healys, a seemingly perfect white Connecticut family with an adopted Black daughter, begins to unravel when faced with issues of repressed gender identity, sexual assault, and substance abuse.

Mary Jane (MJ) Healy is a mother writing the yearly family Christmas letter. She writes about her husband Steve's job promotion, her daughter Frankie's art, and her son Nick's early admission to Harvard University. MJ writes that she got into a car crash, but is healing with the help of natural remedies. What she doesn't write is that Steve is addicted to pornography, Frankie is making out with her best friend, Jo, as the letter is being written, and MJ is addicted to the painkillers from the car accident ("Right Through You"). MJ pressures Nick and Frankie to be perfect to keep up the family's image ("All I Really Want"). At school, Frankie and Jo discuss how their mothers don't understand or accept them: Frankie's mom because of her disapproval of her self-expression, and Jo's mom not accepting them being gay or their gender expression. Jo is thankful for how Frankie understands them, and is sure that everything will turn out alright in the end ("Hand in My Pocket").

MJ tries to get drugs from the pharmacy, but she is out of refills. Desperate, she meets with a familiar dealer, who provides her with opioids. She moves through her day backward, starting with unpacking groceries at home, getting her painkillers in the alley, keeping up appearances with other school moms, and ending with her running out of pills at the beginning of the day ("Smiling"). On the last day of Frankie's English class before winter break, she reads a short story she wrote aloud. The students in the class criticize her since things she claims to be ironic in her piece are not technically ironic, just bad things that happened to someone. A new student, Phoenix, defends Frankie and encourages her to finish ("Ironic"). A romantic attraction begins between the two. After class, Phoenix and Frankie decide to go to a party that night. At home, MJ and Steve get into an argument. Steve says he wants to see a marriage counselor, but MJ refuses ("So Unsexy"). Nick comforts MJ after the fight, to which she responds that he is the only thing she has ever done right. Nick reflects on the pressures on him from his mother to be perfect ("Perfect").

Frankie and Nick go to the party ("Lancer's Party (So Pure)"). Frankie and Phoenix find each other and leave the crowded party to talk alone, and they discuss their imperfect family lives. Meanwhile, Jo doesn't attend the party because their mom forced them to go to a church function. Jo's mom scolds them for not dressing femininely enough ("That I Would Be Good"). The following day, Jo shows Frankie pictures that are circulating throughout the school of Bella, Nick's friend, who was drunk, passed out, and had her shirt pulled up at the party. Other students quickly mock Bella, calling her a slut. Despite barely knowing her, Frankie and Jo go to Bella's house to check on her. Bella reveals that Andrew, Nick's best friend, was the one who took the pictures and raped her. Frankie goes home and wakes Nick up to reprimand him about not going to the police, since he was the only one who saw how drunk Bella was. Nick brushes off Bella's claim, accusing her of being dramatic. MJ overhears the conversation and insists that Nick not come forward as it might ruin his reputation. MJ blames Bella for what happened since she chose to drink, but she is visibly upset by the story ("Wake Up"). MJ walks to the church for the first time in a while to pray about her failing marriage, struggling relationship with Frankie, and for help with her addiction. She then reflects on her memory of being raped in college, but blames herself and feels it was God's plan for her ("Forgiven").

=== Act II ===
Steve and MJ go to their first marriage counseling session, despite MJ's reluctance ("Not the Doctor"). Meanwhile, Frankie and Phoenix hang out at a playground and end up sleeping together ("Head over Feet"). Jo enters the Healys' house uninvited ("Your House") and walks in on Frankie and Phoenix. Jo gets mad and storms out of Frankie's room. MJ and Steve come home early, and Jo tells them that Frankie and Phoenix had sex. Phoenix flees quickly, leaving Frankie alone with her parents. MJ and Steve reprimand her for having sex so young. Frankie comes out to her parents as bisexual, and she gets mad at her parents for disapproving of her consensual sex but not caring about Bella's rape. She subsequently runs away from the house. Steve and MJ fight about the former not being present during Frankie's childhood, while Frankie takes a train alone to New York ("Unprodigal Daughter"). When she gets lost in the city, Frankie calls Phoenix. She tells him that she loves him and that he should come pick her up. However, when Phoenix doesn't say "I love you" back and says he needs to stay at home to help his sister with a medical condition, Frankie gets angry, feeling that Phoenix used her for her body.

Students gossip about Bella and her accusations against Andrew. Bella comes to the Healys' house to talk to Nick, but MJ is the only person at home. MJ tries to comfort Bella by telling her she was also raped in college. Bella asks MJ when she started to feel better after her rape, but MJ doesn't answer. Bella leaves, realizing that it may never get better. Nick comes clean to MJ, telling her he walked in on Andrew raping an unconscious Bella but did nothing and left ("Predator"). Nick says he wants to go to the police, but MJ protests, stating it would only ruin his life. When Nick accuses her of selfishness, MJ slaps him.

Jo comes to New York to pick up Frankie after she calls them out of desperation, lost, and out of money. Frankie shows little remorse for sleeping with Phoenix since she didn't think her relationship with Jo was exclusive. She tells Jo that she is in love with Phoenix. Jo, enraged that the one person they felt understood them doesn't love them, ends the relationship ("You Oughta Know"). At home, MJ overdoses on pills. Steve and Nick find her unconscious ("Uninvited"). When Steve gets to the hospital, he is devastated that he didn't know MJ had an addiction and promises her he will be there for her and the family from now on ("Mary Jane"). When Nick gets to the hospital, MJ tells him he should report to the police, but Nick reveals he already told them about what happened to Bella. Meanwhile, several students attend the rally that Frankie organized to get justice for Bella. Nick apologizes to Bella, who is angered that people only believed her once Nick came forward ("No").

A year has passed, and MJ is writing the Christmas letter again. She writes about the progress being made in their relationships and lives. MJ tells Frankie that she wanted her to feel like every other kid and not be treated differently because of her race, but Frankie tells her that she wouldn't have wanted to fit in with the people in their town ("Thank U"). Frankie dares MJ to email the Christmas letter to everyone, despite its frankness about her overdose and her dislike of the culture in their town. MJ sends it, deciding that this will be her last Christmas letter. Jo and Frankie rekindle their friendship, and Jo has a new girlfriend. Frankie and Phoenix are now just friends. Frankie and MJ, Bella and Nick, and Steve and MJ all now appear to have mended their relationships. Everyone acknowledges that their bad decisions all help them learn and become better people ("You Learn").

== Productions ==
=== Cambridge (2018) ===
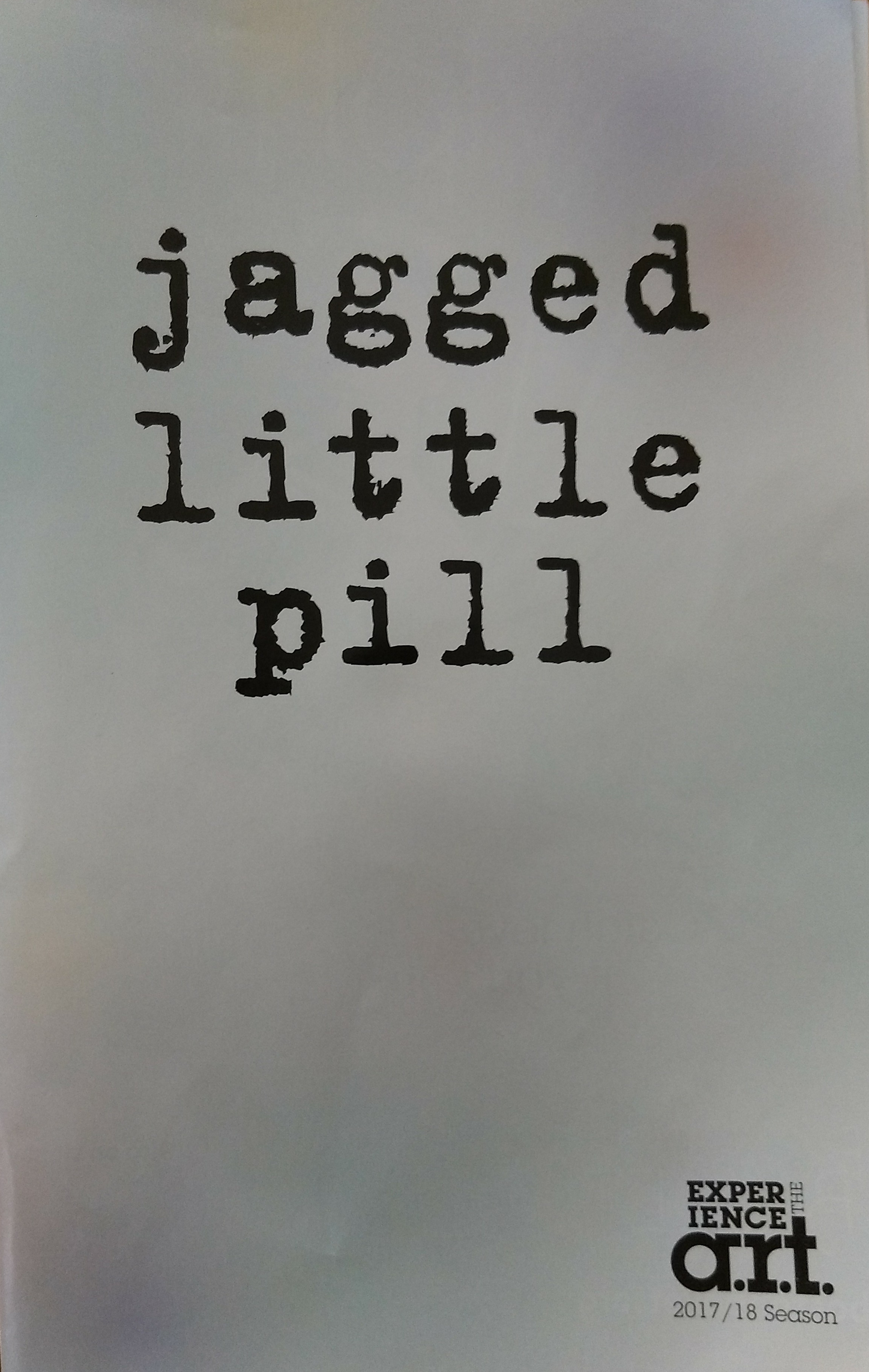
Original playbill for the 2018 world premiere at the American Repertory Theater in Cambridge, Massachusetts.

In May 2017, it was announced that Jagged Little Pill will premiere at the American Repertory Theater in 2018. In March 2018, principal casting was announced, which included Elizabeth Stanley starring as Mary Jane, Sean Allan Krill as Steve, and Derek Klena as Nick. Additionally, Lauren Patten was cast as Jo, Celia Rose Gooding as Frankie, and Kathryn Gallagher as Bella.

The world premiere production of Jagged Little Pill opened on May 5, 2018, and played through July 15. It was directed by Diane Paulus. The musical was sold out throughout the 79-performance run, and became the highest-grossing and longest-running musical at the American Repertory Theatre.

=== Broadway (2019–2021) ===
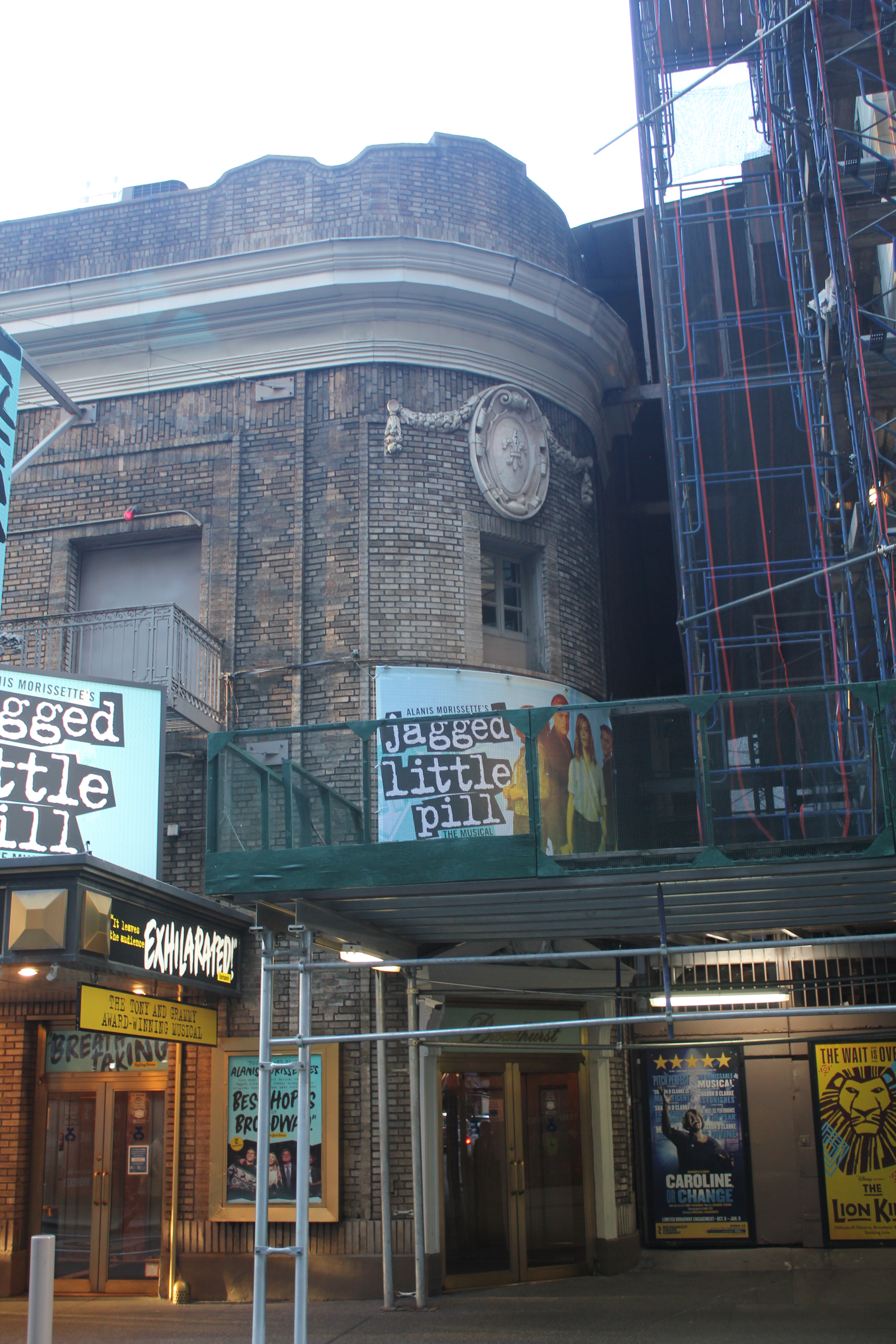
Branding seen outside the Broadhurst Theatre

In January 2019, it was announced that Jagged Little Pill would premiere on Broadway in fall 2019. The principal cast from the world premiere production all transferred with the show to Broadway, with Paulus also continuing as director. The show began previews at the Broadhurst Theatre on November 3, ahead of an official opening night on December 5, 2019. The show suspended performances in March 2020 when all Broadway theatres closed due to the COVID-19 pandemic.

At the 2020 Tony Awards, Jagged Little Pill led with 15 nominations. The musical won two Tony Awards, with Diablo Cody winning for Best Book of a Musical and Patten winning Best Performance by a Featured Actress in a Musical.

Performances resumed at the Broadhurst Theatre on October 21, 2021. Heidi Blickenstaff reopened the show as Mary Jane, filling in for Stanley who was on maternity leave. Once Stanley returned, the two shared the role. Morgan Dudley and Adi Roy joined the cast, replacing Gooding and Cipriano, respectively. In December 2021, multiple performances Jagged Little Pill were canceled due to COVID-19 issues with the cast and crew. On December 20, 2021, it was announced that the production would close permanently. The producers cited the need to "prioritize the health and safety of the cast, crew, and entire team", retroactively making December 17, 2021 its final show after 36 previews and 171 performances.

=== Australia (2021–2022) ===
An Australian production opened at Sydney's Theatre Royal in December 2021. It relocated to Melbourne's Comedy Theatre in January 2022. The cast features Natalie Bassingthwaighte (Mary Jane), Tim Draxl (Steve), Emily Nkomo (Frankie), Liam Head (Nick), Max McKenna (Jo), Grace Miell (Bella) and Aydan (Phoenix).

=== North American tour (2022–2024) ===
In February 2022, it was announced that Jagged Little Pill would launch a North American tour. In September 2022, the cast was announced. It stars Heidi Blickenstaff as Mary Jane, Chris Hoch as Steve, Lauren Chanel as Frankie, Dillon Klena as Nick, Jade McLeod as Jo, Allison Sheppard as Bella, and Rishi Golani as Phoenix.

Following technical rehearsals that began in August 2022 in Louisville, Kentucky, the North American tour opened on September 6, 2022, at the Smith Center in Las Vegas. The first year of the tour will travel to 30 cities across North America, with additional cities planned for subsequent years of the tour.

The North American tour of Jagged Little Pill officially closed on April 7, 2024 in Worcester, MA after 474 performances.

=== Planned West End production ===
In February 2022, it was announced that Jagged Little Pill would premiere on the West End, with an initially planned opening in November 2022. However, no further official plans for the production have been announced, and it has since been pushed back from its initial planned opening date.

== Cast and characters ==
Character	Reading	Workshop	American Repertory Theatre	Broadway	Australian Tour	North American Tour
Character	2017	2017	2018	2019	2021	2022
Mary Jane "MJ" Healy	Idina Menzel	Elizabeth Stanley	Elizabeth Stanley	Elizabeth Stanley	Natalie Bassingthwaighte	Heidi Blickenstaff
Steve Healy	Michael Park	Michael Park	Sean Allan Krill	Sean Allan Krill	Tim Draxl	Chris Hoch
Frankie Healy	Celia Rose Gooding	Celia Rose Gooding	Celia Rose Gooding	Celia Rose Gooding	Emily Nkomo	Lauren Chanel
Nick Healy	Derek Klena	Derek Klena	Derek Klena	Derek Klena	Liam Head	Dillon Klena
Jo Taylor	Lauren Patten	Lauren Patten	Lauren Patten	Lauren Patten	Maggie (Max) Mckenna	Jade McLeod
Bella Fox	—N/a	Kathryn Gallagher	Kathryn Gallagher	Kathryn Gallagher	Grace Miell	Allison Sheppard
Phoenix	—N/a	Antonio Cipriano	Antonio Cipriano	Antonio Cipriano	Aydan Calafiore	Rishi Golani

=== Notable replacements ===
==== Broadway ====
- MJ: Heidi Blickenstaff
- Frankie: Morgan Dudley

== Music ==
Jagged Little Pill features songs previously written and recorded by Alanis, with the exception of "Smiling" and "Predator", which she wrote for the show.

=== Musical numbers ===
Act I

- Overture – Company
- "Right Through You" – Company
- "All I Really Want" – Frankie, Mary Jane, Steve, Nick and Company
- "Hand in My Pocket" – Jo, Frankie and Company
- "Smiling" – Mary Jane and Company‡
- "Ironic" – Frankie and Phoenix
- "So Unsexy" – Steve, Mary Jane and Company
- "Perfect" – Nick
- "Lancer's Party (So Pure)" – Company
- "That I Would Be Good" – Phoenix, Frankie and Jo
- "Wake Up" – Frankie, Nick, Andrew, Bella, Steve, Mary Jane, Company
- "Forgiven" – Mary Jane, Steve, Nick, Andrew, Bella, Frankie, Jo, Phoenix, Company

Act II

- Entr'acte/"Hands Clean" – Company
- "Not the Doctor" – Mary Jane and Steve
- "Head over Feet" – Steve, Mary Jane, Phoenix and Frankie
- "Your House" – Jo†
- "Unprodigal Daughter" – Frankie and Company
- "Predator" – Bella and Company‡
- "You Oughta Know" – Jo and Company
- "Uninvited" – Mary Jane and Company
- "Mary Jane" – Steve and Company
- "No" – Bella and Company
- "Thank U" – Company
- "You Learn" – Company

Keys

- † Not included on the Cast Recording.
- ‡ Song newly written for the show

=== Cast recording ===
The original Broadway cast recording was released digitally on November 29, 2019, followed by a physical album release on December 6, 2019. The cast album is distributed through Atlantic Records, and is produced by Tom Kitt and Neal Avron. It debuted at number two on the Billboard Cast Albums chart, number 14 on the Alternative Album Sales chart, and number 26 on the Rock Album Sales chart.

At the 2021 Grammy Awards, the cast recording album won Best Musical Theater Album.

In the fall of 2022, Atlantic records released one new, stand-alone track featuring Heidi Blickenstaff and the original Broadway cast singing Uninvited.

No.	Title	Performer(s)	Length
1.	"Overture"	Ensemble	1:11
2.	"Right Through You"	Ensemble	0:53
3.	"All I Really Want"	Celia Rose Gooding, Elizabeth Stanley, Sean Allan Krill, Derek Klena, Ensemble	4:58
4.	"Hand in My Pocket"	Lauren Patten, Gooding, Ensemble	3:01
5.	"Smiling"	Stanley, Ensemble	4:13
6.	"Ironic"	Gooding, Antonio Cipriano, Laurel Harris, Kei Tsuruharatani, Ezra Menas, John Cardoza, Ensemble	3:54
7.	"So Unsexy"	Krill, Stanley, Ensemble	2:33
8.	"Perfect"	Klena, Ensemble	2:52
9.	"Lancer's Party (So Pure)"	Gooding, Kathryn Gallagher, Ensemble	1:32
10.	"That I Would Be Good"	Cipriano, Gooding, Patten, Ensemble	3:36
11.	"Wake Up"	Gooding, Klena, Logan Hart, Gallagher, Stanley, Ensemble	4:23
12.	"Forgiven"	Stanley, Ensemble	4:53
13.	"Entr'Acte (Hands Clean)"	Ensemble	0:56
14.	"Not The Doctor"	Stanley, Krill, Nora Schell, Ensemble	1:37
15.	"Head Over Feet"	Cipriano, Gooding, Krill, Stanley, Patten, Ensemble	4:09
16.	"Unprodigal Daughter"	Gooding, Ensemble	2:54
17.	"Predator"	Gallagher, Jane Bruce, Ensemble	4:40
18.	"You Oughta Know"	Patten, Ensemble	4:19
19.	"Uninvited"	Stanley, Gallagher, Ensemble	3:45
20.	"Mary Jane"	Krill, Ensemble	3:42
21.	"No"	Gallagher, Schell, Bruce, Menas, Max Kumangai, Patten, Gooding, Klena, Ensemble	3:38
22.	"Thank U"	Schell, Harris, Menas, Gooding, Ensemble	1:58
23.	"You Learn"	Ensemble	3:53

== Adaptations ==
=== Novelization ===
A young adult novel adaptation was announced in Rolling Stone on December 9, 2021, and was released on April 26, 2022, by Abrams Books, written by Eric Smith in collaboration with the show's creators.

== Controversy ==
In the original world premiere production at the American Repertory Theater, the character of Jo was nonbinary, and portrayed by Lauren Patten, a cisgender woman. During the original production, Patten confirmed the use of they/them pronouns for the character and referred to them as nonbinary and genderqueer on multiple occasions. Although the character's sexuality was never explicitly stated, there were multiple references to Jo being nonbinary.

But when the show transferred to Broadway, the show openly referred to Jo as a cisgender woman. In a 2020 interview, Patten said, "Jo never was written as anything other than cisgender". In April 2021, debate and backlash ensued on social media. The change in Jo's character was viewed as an example of the underrepresentation of trans and nonbinary people on Broadway. Despite this, following her Tony Award win for Best Featured Actress in a Musical, Patten thanked her "trans and nonbinary friends".

On September 18, 2021, lead producers Vivek Tiwary, Arvind Ethan David and Eva Price apologized for changing Jo's gender identity and for not listening to feedback. In their statement, the producers acknowledged their mistakes as they "set out to portray a character on a gender expansive journey without a known outcome". The show hired a new dramaturge to revise the scripts, and pledged to cast actors to play Jo who are on their own gender journeys.

Canadian actor Jade McLeod, who identifies as nonbinary, was cast as Jo in the North American tour of Jagged Little Pill. The character was re-established as nonbinary, with McLeod reporting being given some freedom to reimagine the role.

== Critical reception ==
=== Cambridge production ===
The New York Times called the Cambridge production "[p]assionate, dramatically compelling, and big-hearted...Jagged Little Pill breaks the jukebox musical mold, and takes on the good work we are always asking new musicals to do: the work of singing about real things." A New York Times feature story published on May 20, 2018, called the show's story, "steeped in hot-button issues like opiate addiction, gender identity and sexual assault", "very much of the present", and said the show "may just be the most woke musical since Hair."

Bob Verini of Variety wrote, "Not since Rent has a musical invested so many bravura roles with so much individual life...It's a risky business, making a musical not from a story demanding to be told but from a set of songs merely available to be used. Jagged Little Pill triumphantly avoids the pitfalls. Always engaging, often moving and even rousing, the show boasts dramatic interest and integrity on its own theatrical terms, courtesy of director Diane Paulus, first-time librettist Diablo Cody, and that peerless, soulful balladeer of the modern Western condition, Alanis Morissette."

=== Broadway ===
The Broadway production of Jagged Little Pill opened to positive reviews. The New York Times called the musical "redemptive, rousing and real ... Jagged Little Pill stands alongside the original musicals that have been sustaining the best hopes of Broadway". Praising the show's score, Variety wrote, "Morissette’s youthful perspective and the rocking-good score make Jagged Little Pill feel very much of the moment". Rolling Stone awarded the production four out of five stars, writing that although the show feels "overly 'woke'" at times and "wears its earnestness on its sleeve", Jagged Little Pill burns with passion ... and enthusiastic beauty." The show was nominated for 15 Tony Awards.

=== 2022–2023 North American Tour ===
Of a January 2023 performance at Providence Performing Arts Center, reviewer John McDaid wrote in BroadwayWorld that a "[s]tellar national tour brings Morisette's music to life" and called Jagged Little Pill "a powerful, moving production, superbly crafted and full of top-notch performances" and "a rare show: a jukebox musical that feels organic; a 'message' show that foregrounds authentic characters. Much of the credit goes to the excellent cast, who are intensely right there in the moment, at every moment. It's a powerful theatrical experience, a visual delight, and you absolutely will leave the theater singing."

== Awards and nominations ==
=== Cambridge premiere production ===
Year	Award	Category	Nominee	Result
2019	Elliot Norton Awards	Outstanding Musical Production		Nominated
2019	Elliot Norton Awards	Outstanding Musical Performance by an Actress	Lauren Patten	Nominated
2019	Elliot Norton Awards	Outstanding Musical Performance by an Actress	Elizabeth Stanley	Nominated
2019	Elliot Norton Awards	Outstanding Choreography	Sidi Larbi Cherkaoui	Won
2019	Elliot Norton Awards	Outstanding Musical Direction	Bryan Perri	Nominated
2019	IRNE Awards	Best Musical		Nominated
2019	IRNE Awards	Best New Musical		Nominated
2019	IRNE Awards	Best Actress – Musical	Elizabeth Stanley	Nominated
2019	IRNE Awards	Best Supporting Actress – Musical	Lauren Patten	Won
2019	IRNE Awards	Best Ensemble		Nominated
2019	IRNE Awards	Best Director – Musical	Diane Paulus	Nominated
2019	IRNE Awards	Best Music Director	Bryan Perri	Nominated
2019	IRNE Awards	Best Sound Design	Jonathan Deans	Nominated

=== Original Broadway production ===
Year	Award	Category	Nominee	Result
2020	Tony Awards	Best Musical		Nominated
2020	Tony Awards	Best Book of a Musical	Diablo Cody	Won
2020	Tony Awards	Best Performance by a Leading Actress in a Musical	Elizabeth Stanley	Nominated
2020	Tony Awards	Best Performance by a Featured Actor in a Musical	Derek Klena	Nominated
2020	Tony Awards	Best Performance by a Featured Actor in a Musical	Sean Allan Krill	Nominated
2020	Tony Awards	Best Performance by a Featured Actress in a Musical	Kathryn Gallagher	Nominated
2020	Tony Awards	Best Performance by a Featured Actress in a Musical	Celia Rose Gooding	Nominated
2020	Tony Awards	Best Performance by a Featured Actress in a Musical	Lauren Patten	Won
2020	Tony Awards	Best Direction of a Musical	Diane Paulus	Nominated
2020	Tony Awards	Best Choreography	Sidi Larbi Cherkaoui	Nominated
2020	Tony Awards	Best Orchestrations	Tom Kitt	Nominated
2020	Tony Awards	Best Scenic Design of a Musical	Riccardo Hernández and Lucy MacKinnon	Nominated
2020	Tony Awards	Best Costume Design of a Musical	Emily Rebholz	Nominated
2020	Tony Awards	Best Lighting Design of a Musical	Justin Townsend	Nominated
2020	Tony Awards	Best Sound Design of a Musical	Jonathan Deans	Nominated
2020	Drama Desk Awards	Outstanding Actress in a Musical	Elizabeth Stanley	Nominated
2020	Drama Desk Awards	Outstanding Featured Actress in a Musical	Lauren Patten	Won
2020	Drama Desk Awards	Outstanding Orchestrations	Tom Kitt	Won
2020	Drama League Awards	Outstanding Production of a Musical		Nominated
2020	Drama League Awards	Distinguished Performance	Lauren Patten	Nominated
2020	Outer Critics Circle Awards	Outstanding New Broadway Musical		Honoree
2020	Outer Critics Circle Awards	Outstanding Book of a Musical	Diablo Cody	Honoree
2020	Outer Critics Circle Awards	Outstanding Actress in a Musical	Elizabeth Stanley	Honoree
2020	Outer Critics Circle Awards	Outstanding Featured Actress in a Musical	Kathryn Gallagher	Honoree
2020	Outer Critics Circle Awards	Outstanding Featured Actress in a Musical	Lauren Patten	Honoree
2020	Outer Critics Circle Awards	Outstanding Director of a Musical	Diane Paulus	Honoree
2020	Outer Critics Circle Awards	Outstanding Choreographer	Sidi Larbi Cherkaoui	Honoree
2020	Outer Critics Circle Awards	Outstanding Orchestrations	Tom Kitt	Honoree
2020	GLAAD Media Awards	Outstanding Broadway Production		Nominated
2021	Grammy Awards	Best Musical Theater Album	Neal Avron, Kathryn Gallagher, Pete Ganbarg, Vivek J. Tiwary, Tom Kitt, Michael Parker, Lauren Patten, Celia Rose Gooding, Craig Rosen, Elizabeth Stanley	Won
2021	Artios Awards	New York Broadway Theatre – Musical	Stephen Kopel	Nominated
2022	Chita Rivera Awards	Outstanding Female Dancer in a Broadway Show	Heather Lang	Nominated
