= Sean Allan Krill =

American actor

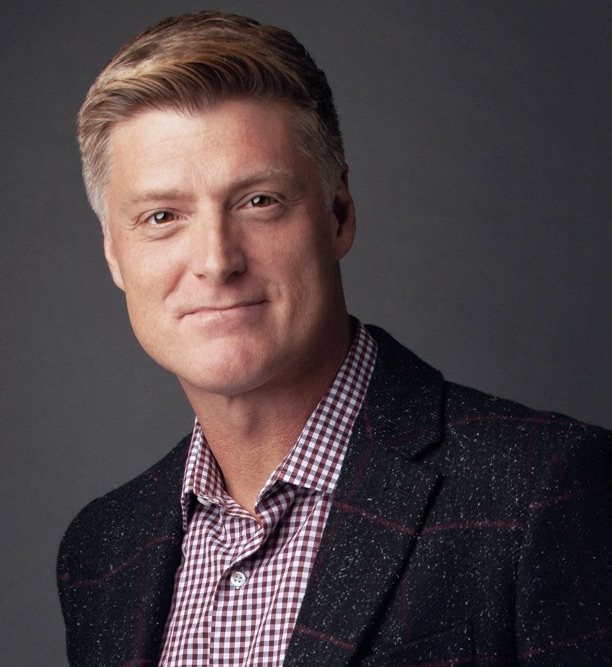
- Photo by Brian Ray Norris
- Born: June 10, 1971 (age 55)
- Education: Wayne State University
- Occupations: Actor, singer
- Spouse(s): Harry Bouvy (m. 2015), Guy Adkins
- Website: seanallankrill.com

Sean Allan Krill (born June 10, 1971) is an American actor and singer who has appeared in film and television, on Broadway, Off-Broadway, and at prestigious regional theaters across the country. Krill made his Broadway debut as Sam Carmichael in 2008 in Mamma Mia!. He originated the role of Steve Healy in the Alanis Morissette musical Jagged Little Pill for which he was nominated for the 2020 Tony Award for Best Featured Actor in a Musical, and the cast album of the critically acclaimed show was the recipient of the 2020 Grammy Award for Best Musical Theater Album. Krill played Governor Slaton in the 2023 Broadway production of Parade, which won the Tony Award for Best Revival. He voiced the role of VP Wheeler in the Netflix animated series Jentry Chau vs. the Underworld, and was recently seen as Buddy Holmes in the feature film Song Sung Blue.

== Life and career ==
Sean Allan Krill was born in Altus, Oklahoma. A self-professed "Air Force brat", Krill lived in many different places as a child, but grew up predominantly in Shelby Township, a suburb of Detroit, Michigan. After watching a national tour performance of Les Misérables at The Fisher Theater, Krill was inspired to pursue a career in acting. Krill studied at Wayne State University, where he received the Lily Tomlin Scholarship for Theatre.

== Theatre ==
| Year | Title | Role | Notes |
|---|---|---|---|
| 1993-1996 | Forever Plaid | Sparky | Gem Theater & Royal George Theater, Regional |
| 1996 | Disney's Hercules Summer Spectacular | The Prince | Chicago Theater, Regional |
| 1998 | Radio City Rockettes Christmas Spectacular | Featured Singer | Rosemont Theater, Regional |
| 1999 | Jesus Christ Superstar | Jesus | Drury Lane Oakbrook, Regional |
| 1999 | The All Night Strut | Baritone | Drury Lane Evergreen Park |
| 2000 | Damn Yankees | Joe Hardy | Marriott Theater, Regional |
| 2001 | Pirates of Penzance | Pirate King | Marriott Theater, Regional |
| 2001 | 1776 | Thomas Jefferson | Marriott Theater, Regional |
| 2002-2003 | Sunday in the Park with George | Soldier/Alex | Chicago Shakespeare Theater, Regional |
| 2003-2004 | Thoroughly Modern Millie | Trevor Graydon III | First National Tour |
| 2004 | Into the Woods | The Wolf / Cinderella's Prince | Peninsula Players, Regional |
| 2004 | The Importance of Being Earnest | Jack | Court Theater, Regional |
| 2005 | Travesties | Tristen Tzara | Court Theater, Regional |
| 2005 | Brigadoon | Tommy Albright | Marriott Theater, Regional |
| 2005 | Henry V | The Dauphin | Notre Dame Shakespeare, Regional |
| 2005 | Dessa Rose | Adam Nehemiah | Apple Tree Theater, Regional |
| 2006-2009 | Mamma Mia! | Sam Carmichael | Winter Garden Theatre, Broadway & National Tour |
| 2009 | The Brother/Sister Plays, by Tarell Alvin McCraney | O Li Roon | The Public Theater, Off-Broadway |
| 2010 | Antony & Cleopatra | Agrippa | Hartford Stage, Regional |
| 2011 | Spamalot | Sir Dennis Galahad / Prince Herbert's Father / The Black Knight | Drury Lane Oakbrook, Regional |
| 2011 | Hot L Baltimore | The Man | Steppenwolf Theater Company |
| 2011 | On a Clear Day You Can See Forever | Dr. Mark Bruckner Standby (Harry Connick, Jr.) | St. James Theater, Broadway |
| 2012 | Sunday in the Park with George | Georges Seurat / George | Skylight Music Theater, Regional |
| 2012 | Boeing Boeing | Bernard | Mason Street Warehouse, Regional |
| 2012 | A Civil War Christmas, by Paula Vogel | John Wilkes Booth | New York Theatre Workshop, Off-Broadway |
| 2013 | Hit The Wall, by Ike Holter | A-Gay | Barrow Street Theatre, Off-Broadway |
| 2013 | Sideways | Jack | La Jolla Playhouse, Regional |
| 2014 | Mamma Mia! | Sam Carmichael | Tropicana, Las Vegas |
| 2015 | Honeymoon in Vegas | Tommy Korman Standby (Tony Danza) | Nederlander Theatre, Broadway |
| 2015 | Sense and Sensibility, by Paul Gordon | Colonel Brandon | Chicago Shakespeare Theater, Regional |
| 2015 | White Christmas | Bob Wallace | Drury Lane Oakbrook, Regional |
| 2016 | Sense and Sensibility by Paul Gordon | Colonel Brandon | Old Globe Theater, Regional |
| 2017 | Joan of Arc: Into the Fire, by David Byrne | Bishop Cauchon | The Public Theater, Off-Broadway |
| 2017 | Deathless | Kevin Serling | Goodspeed, Regional |
| 2017 | Honeymoon in Vegas | Tommy Korman | Marriott Theater, Regional |
| 2018 | Chess (staged concert) | Walter de Courcey | Kennedy Center, Regional |
| 2018-2021 | Jagged Little Pill | Steve Healy | Broadhurst Theater, Broadway & American Repertory Theater, Regional |
| 2022 | Legally Blonde | Professor Callahan | The Muny, Regional |
| 2022 | Parade | Governor John Slaton | New York City Center, Off-Broadway |
| 2022 | Chess (staged concert) | Walter de Courcey | Broadhurst Theatre, Broadway |
| 2023 | Parade | Governor John Slaton | Bernard B. Jacobs Theatre, Broadway |
| 2023 | Elf | Walter Hobbs | North Carolina Theater, Regional |
| 2024 | Sunday in the Park with George | Georges Seurat / George | Porchlight Music Theatre, Regional |
| 2025 | Floyd Collins | H.T. Carmichael | Vivian Beaumont Theatre, Broadway |
| 2025-2026 | Chess | Walter de Courcey | Imperial Theatre, Broadway |

== Film & Television ==
| Year | Title | Role | Notes |
|---|---|---|---|
| 2016 | Mr. Robot | Kevin | TV Recurring - Season 2, 4 Episodes |
| 2019 | The Blacklist | Vance Palmer | TV Guest Star - Season 7, Episode 3 |
| 2019 | Godfather of Harlem | Lester Wolff | TV Recurring - Season 1, 2 Episodes |
| 2020 - 2022 | Search Party | Sydney Muscat | TV Recurring - Seasons 3 & 5, 3 Episodes |
| 2021 | Blue Bloods | Elon Lubin | TV Guest Star - Season 11, Episode 14 |
| 2021 | Dr. Death | Dr. Timothy Darnton | TV Guest Star - Season 1, Episode 5 |
| 2021 | Dopesick | Purdue Sales Manager | TV Recurring - 2 Episodes |
| 2021 | Getaway | Gregory | TV Pilot |
| 2023 | Intermedium | Greg Daugherty | Feature Film |
| 2023 | Sense and Sensibility | Colonel Brandon | Live Theatre Pro-Shot |
| 2024 | FBI: Most Wanted | John Parkman | TV Guest Star - Season 5, Episode 8 |
| 2024 | Jentry Chau vs. the Underworld | VP Wheeler (Voice) | TV Recurring - Season 1, 9 Episodes |
| 2024 | Champions | Gerald | Short Film |
| 2025 | Decorado | Demon/Carlos (Voice) | Feature Film |
| 2025 | Song Sung Blue | Buddy Holmes | Feature Film |

== Awards & Nominations ==
| Year | Award | Category | Nominated work | Result |
|---|---|---|---|---|
| 1995 | Joseph Jefferson Award | Best Ensemble and Best Revue | Forever Plaid | Won |
| 2003 | Carbonell Award | Best Supporting Actor | Thoroughly Modern Millie | Nominated |
| 2003 | Leon Rabin Award | Best Supporting Actor | Thoroughly Modern Millie | Nominated |
| 2005 | Joseph Jefferson Award | Outstanding Leading Actor in a Musical | Brigadoon | Nominated |
| 2006 | BroadwayWorld | Outstanding Lead Actor | Mamma Mia! | Won |
| 2015 | Joseph Jefferson Award | Outstanding Supporting Actor in a Musical | Sense and Sensibility | Nominated |
| 2016 | Craig Noel Award | Outstanding Featured Performance in a Musical | Sense and Sensibility | Won |
| 2020 | Tony Award | Best Performance by a Featured Actor in a Musical | Jagged Little Pill | Nominated |
| 2020 | Grammy Award | Best Musical Theater Album | Jagged Little Pill | Won |
| 2024 | Grammy Award | Best Musical Theater Album | Parade | Nominated |

== Personal life ==
After graduating from Wayne State University College of Fine, Performing, and Communication Arts, he moved to Chicago to open the original Chicago company of Forever Plaid in 1994, playing Sparky. Krill lived and worked in Chicago for over 15 years, appearing in both plays and musicals at theaters throughout the city, including Royal George Theater, Marriott Theatre, Drury Lane Theatre, Court Theater, Chicago Theatre, Rosemont Horizon, Cadillac Palace Theatre, Nederlander Theatre, CIBC Theater, Chicago Shakespeare Theater, and Steppenwolf Theatre Company.

Krill's partner of 13 years, fellow actor Guy Adkins, died on May 12, 2010, after a 15-month bout with colon cancer. Krill and actor Harry Bouvy married in 2015, after bonding over the experience of losing their partners. Krill & Bouvy performed together in regional productions of Boeing-Boeing & White Christmas, and in Parade at New York City Center & at Bernard B. Jacob's Theater on Broadway.

Krill lives in New York, New York.
