= God Didn't Give Me a Week's Notice =

2001 film by Richard Dailey

God Didn't Give Me a Week's Notice is a 15-minute documentary by Richard Dailey about Margaret Holloway, also known as "The Shakespeare Lady" of New Haven, Connecticut.

Richard Dailey attended Bennington College at the same time as Margaret Holloway. He was three years behind her and their acquaintance was casual. She was very talented and well known on campus. When he found that she was homeless and performing for tips on Whitney Ave in New Haven, Connecticut, he asked if he could record her performances and she agreed. He and Holloway worked two weeks to produce a 15-minute documentary. He then spent the next six months editing the material from his home in Paris.

As reported in the Yale Daily News, December 7, 2001:

Set to jazzy music, the film features Holloway dramatically reciting several pieces from Euripides, Shakespeare and Chaucer. Dailey also recorded Margaret speaking about her life. Interspersed through the documentary are candid and telling stills of Holloway in various locations in New Haven.

Dailey made a handshake agreement with Holloway that any revenue produced by the film would be divided equally between the two of them. The Yale Daily News reported that the Dec. 9 2001 benefit screening at York Square Cinemas on Broadway was an exception. All of the proceeds from that show would be donated to Holloway. It is unknown how much money was raised.

In the documentary, lines from Holloway's 1980 thesis run sporadically across the bottom of the screen.

"Many artists have aspired to a theater of hunger," Holloway wrote.

"Many were imprisoned, driven insane, etc. These artists know that there is no separation between the quest toward a theater of hunger and a quest toward a way of life. We continue in this quest."
