= Glen Ballard production discography =

Projects supervised by American songwriter

Songwriting and production discography of Glen Ballard.

== Discography ==
=== Songwriting discography ===
Songs written and co-written by Glen Ballard.

Year	Artist	Album/Film	Song	Co-written with
1979	Kiki Dee	Stay with Me	"One Step"	
1980	George Benson	Give Me the Night	"What's on Your Mind"	Kerry Chater
1983	Randy Crawford	Nightline	"Nightline"	Brie Howard, Davey Faragher
1983	Lee Greenwood	Somebody's Gonna Love You	"Someone Who Remembers"	Kerry Chater, Rory Bourke
1983	James Ingram	It's Your Night	"Try Your Love Again"	Brock Walsh
1983	George Strait	Right or Wrong	"You Look So Good in Love"	Rory Bourke, Kerry Chater
1983	The Pointer Sisters	Break Out	"Dance Electric"	Brock Walsh
1983	The Pointer Sisters	Break Out	"Nightline"	Davey Faragher, Brie Howard
1984	Patti Austin	Patti Austin	"It's Gonna Be Special"	Clif Magness
1984	Patti Austin	Patti Austin	"Change Your Attitude"	Clif Magness
1984	Patti Austin	Patti Austin	"Shoot The Moon"	Clif Magness
1984	Lee Greenwood	You've Got a Good Love Comin'	"(I Found) Love in Time"	Clif Magness
1984	Thelma Houston	Qualifying Heat	"Shake You"	Clif Magness
1984	Al Jarreau	High Crime	"Imagination"	Al Jarreau, Jay Graydon, Clif Magness
1984	Evelyn King	So Romantic	"Show Me (Don't Tell Me)"	Clif Magness
1984	Evelyn King	So Romantic	"Give Me One Reason"	Clif Magness
1984	Jack Wagner	All I Need	"Fighting the Nights"	Clif Magness
1984	Jack Wagner	All I Need	"All I Need"	Clif Magness, David Pack
1984	Jack Wagner	All I Need	"Lady of My Heart"	David Foster, Jay Graydon
1984	Philip Bailey	Chinese Wall	"I Go Crazy"	Philip Bailey, Marti Sharron
1984	Philip Bailey	Chinese Wall	"For Every Heart That's Been Broken"	Clif Magness
1984	Philip Bailey	Chinese Wall	"Show You the Way to Love"	Philip Bailey, Marti Sharron
1985	Teddy Pendergrass	Workin' It Back	"Want You Back in My Life"	Clif Magness
1985	DeBarge	Rhythm of the Night	"Prime Time"	Clif Magness, Jay Graydon
1985	John Farnham, Sarah M. Taylor	The Slugger's Wife	"Love (That's Just the Way It Goes"	
1986	Chaka Khan	Destiny	"I Can't Be Loved"	Randy Goodrum
1986	Pointer Sisters	Hot Together	"Say the Word"	Marti Sharron, Chuck Wild
1986	Pointer Sisters	Hot Together	"Eyes Don't Lie"	Siedah Garrett
1987	Earth, Wind & Fire	Touch the World	"Here Today and Gone Tomorrow"	Philip Bailey, Marti Sharron
1987	Michael Jackson	Bad	"Man in the Mirror	Siedah Garrett
1987	Deniece Williams	Water Under the Bridge	"Water Under the Bridge"	Marti Sharron
1988	Paula Abdul	Forever Your Girl	"State of Attraction"	Siedah Garrett
1988	Siedah Garrett	Kiss of Life	"The Legend of Ruby Diamond"	Siedah Garrett
1988	D'Atra Hicks, Evan Rogers	Everybody's All-American	"Until Forever"	
1988	Barbra Streisand	Till I Loved You	"The Places You Find Love"	Clif Magness
1989	Natalie Cole	Good to Be Back	"The Rest of the Night"	Randy Goodrum
1989	Aretha Franklin	Through the Storm	"Mercy"	Siedah Garrett
1989	Siedah Garrett	Lean on Me	"All the Way to Love"	Siedah Garrett
1989	Gregory Hines	Tap	"Can't Escape This Rhythm"	
1989	Quincy Jones	Back on the Block	"The Places You Find Love"	Clif Magness
1990	Thelma Houston	Throw You Down	"What He Has"	Richard Perry, Siedah Garrett
1990	Seiko Matsuda	Seiko	"Who's That Boy"	Randy Goodrum
1990	Wilson Phillips	Wilson Phillips	"Hold On"	Chynna Phillips, Carnie Wilson
1990	Wilson Phillips	Wilson Phillips	"You're in Love"	Chynna Phillips, Carnie Wilson, Wendy Wilson
1990	Wilson Phillips	Wilson Phillips	"Over and Over"	Chynna Phillips, Carnie Wilson, Wendy Wilson
1990	Wilson Phillips	Wilson Phillips	"Ooh You're Gold"	Chynna Phillips, Carnie Wilson, Wendy Wilson
1990	Wilson Phillips	Wilson Phillips	"The Dream Is Still Alive"	Chynna Phillips, Carnie Wilson, Wendy Wilson
1991	Curtis Stigers	Curtis Stigers	"I Wonder Why"	Curtis Stigers
1991	Curtis Stigers	Curtis Stigers	"People Like Us"	Curtis Stigers
1991	Michael Jackson	Dangerous	"Keep the Faith"	Michael Jackson, Siedah Garrett
1992	Stacy Earl	Stacy Earl	"Sho 'Nuf a Star"	Clif Magness, Siedah Garrett
1992	Trey Lorenz	Trey Lorenz	"It Only Hurts When It's Love"	Trey Lorenz
1992	Trey Lorenz	Trey Lorenz	"Find a Way"	Trey Lorenz
1992	Wilson Phillips	Shadows and Light	"You Won't See Me Cry"	Wilson Phillips
1992	Wilson Phillips	Shadows and Light	"Give It Up"	Wilson Phillips
1992	Wilson Phillips	Shadows and Light	"This Doesn't Have to Be Love"	Wilson Phillips
1992	Wilson Phillips	Shadows and Light	"Where Are You?"	Chynna Phillips
1992	Wilson Phillips	Shadows and Light	"Flesh and Blood"	Wilson Phillips
1992	Wilson Phillips	Shadows and Light	"Fueled for Houston"	Wilson Phillips
1992	Wilson Phillips	Shadows and Light	"Goodbye Carmen"	Wilson Phillips
1993	K. T. Oslin	Greatest Hits: Songs from an Aging Sex Bomb	"You Can't Do That"	Will Jennings, K. T. Oslin
1993	Lea Salonga	Lea Salonga	"Lessons of Love"	Siedah Garrett
1995	Alanis Morissette	Jagged Little Pill	"All I Really Want"	Alanis Morissette
1995	Alanis Morissette	Jagged Little Pill	"You Oughta Know"	Alanis Morissette
1995	Alanis Morissette	Jagged Little Pill	"Perfect"	Alanis Morissette
1995	Alanis Morissette	Jagged Little Pill	"Hand in My Pocket"	Alanis Morissette
1995	Alanis Morissette	Jagged Little Pill	"Right Through You"	Alanis Morissette
1995	Alanis Morissette	Jagged Little Pill	"Forgiven"	Alanis Morissette
1995	Alanis Morissette	Jagged Little Pill	"You Learn"	Alanis Morissette
1995	Alanis Morissette	Jagged Little Pill	"Head over Feet"	Alanis Morissette
1995	Alanis Morissette	Jagged Little Pill	"Mary Jane"	Alanis Morissette
1995	Alanis Morissette	Jagged Little Pill	"Ironic"	Alanis Morissette
1995	Alanis Morissette	Jagged Little Pill	"Not the Doctor"	Alanis Morissette
1995	Alanis Morissette	Jagged Little Pill	"Wake Up"	Alanis Morissette
1995	Sheena Easton	My Cherie	"Too Much in Love"	Clif Magness
1995	Chynna Phillips	Naked And Sacred	"Follow Love Down"	Chynna Phillips
1995	Toto	Tambu	"Just Can't Get to You"	Steve Lukather, David Paich
1995	Toto	Tambu	"The Road Goes On"	Steve Lukather, David Paich
1997	Aerosmith	Nine Lives	"Falling in Love (Is Hard on the Knees)"	Steven Tyler, Joe Perry
1997	Aerosmith	Nine Lives	"Taste of India"	Steven Tyler, Joe Perry
1997	Aerosmith	Nine Lives	"Pink"	Steven Tyler, Richard Supa
1997	Chicago	The Heart of Chicago 1967–1997	"Here in My Heart"	James Newton Howard
1997	The Corrs	Talk On Corners	"Queen of Hollywood"	The Corrs, Dane Deviller, Sean Hosein
1997	Amy Grant	Behind the Eyes	"Nobody Home"	Siedah Garrett
1997	Kenny Loggins	The Unimaginable Life	"One Chance at a Time"	Kenny Loggins
1997	Jennifer Rush	Credo	"The Places You Find Love"	Clif Magness
1998	Alanis Morissette	Supposed Former Infatuation Junkie	"Front Row"	Alanis Morissette
1998	Alanis Morissette	Supposed Former Infatuation Junkie	"Baba"	Alanis Morissette
1998	Alanis Morissette	Supposed Former Infatuation Junkie	"Thank U"	Alanis Morissette
1998	Alanis Morissette	Supposed Former Infatuation Junkie	"That I Would Be Good"	Alanis Morissette
1998	Alanis Morissette	Supposed Former Infatuation Junkie	"The Couch"	Alanis Morissette
1998	Alanis Morissette	Supposed Former Infatuation Junkie	"Can't Not"	Alanis Morissette
1998	Alanis Morissette	Supposed Former Infatuation Junkie	"UR"	Alanis Morissette
1998	Alanis Morissette	Supposed Former Infatuation Junkie	"I Was Hoping"	Alanis Morissette
1998	Alanis Morissette	Supposed Former Infatuation Junkie	"One"	Alanis Morissette
1998	Alanis Morissette	Supposed Former Infatuation Junkie	"Would Not Come"	Alanis Morissette
1998	Alanis Morissette	Supposed Former Infatuation Junkie	"Unsent"	Alanis Morissette
1998	Alanis Morissette	Supposed Former Infatuation Junkie	"So Pure"	Alanis Morissette
1998	Alanis Morissette	Supposed Former Infatuation Junkie	"Joining You"	Alanis Morissette
2000	Texas	Titan A.E.	"Like Lovers (Holding On)"	Johnny McElhone, Sharleen Spiteri
2000	Bliss 66	Titan A.E.	"Not Quite Paradise"	Cheyenne Goff
2000	Splashdown	Titan A.E.	"Karma Slave"	Adam von Buhler, Kasson Crooker, Melissa Kaplan
2001	Live	The Mummy Returns	"Forever May Not Be Long Enough"	Ed Kowalczyk
2001	Shakira	Laundry Service	"The One"	Shakira
2001	Dave Matthews Band	Everyday	"I Did It"	David J. Matthews
2001	Dave Matthews Band	Everyday	"When the World Ends"	David J. Matthews
2001	Dave Matthews Band	Everyday	"The Space Between"	David J. Matthews
2001	Dave Matthews Band	Everyday	"Dreams of Our Fathers"	David J. Matthews
2001	Dave Matthews Band	Everyday	"So Right"	David J. Matthews
2001	Dave Matthews Band	Everyday	"If I Had It All"	David J. Matthews
2001	Dave Matthews Band	Everyday	"What You Are"	David J. Matthews
2001	Dave Matthews Band	Everyday	"Angel"	David J. Matthews
2001	Dave Matthews Band	Everyday	"Fool to Think"	David J. Matthews
2001	Dave Matthews Band	Everyday	"Sleep to Dream Her"	David J. Matthews
2001	Dave Matthews Band	Everyday	"Mother Father"	David J. Matthews
2001	Dave Matthews Band	Everyday	"Everyday"	David J. Matthews
2001	Lit	Atomic	"She Comes"	A. Jay Popoff, Jeremy Popoff
2001	Shelby Lynne	Love, Shelby	"Trust Me"	Shelby Lynne
2001	Shelby Lynne	Love, Shelby	"Bend"	Shelby Lynne
2001	Shelby Lynne	Love, Shelby	"Jesus on a Greyhound"	Shelby Lynne
2001	Shelby Lynne	Love, Shelby	"Wall in Your Heart"	Shelby Lynne
2001	Shelby Lynne	Love, Shelby	"I Can't Wait"	Shelby Lynne
2001	Shelby Lynne	Love, Shelby	"Ain't It the Truth"	Various
2002	Sheila Nicholls	Wake	"Faith"	Sheila Nicholls
2002	Christina Aguilera	Stripped	"The Voice Within"	Christina Aguilera
2003	Lisa Marie Presley	To Whom It May Concern	"S.O.B."	Clif Magness, Lisa Marie Presley
2003	Lisa Marie Presley	To Whom It May Concern	"Lights Out"	Clif Magness, Lisa Marie Presley
2003	Lisa Marie Presley	To Whom It May Concern	"Sinking In"	Danny Keogh, Clif Magness, Lisa Marie Presley
2003	Lisa Marie Presley	To Whom It May Concern	"So Lovely"	John Barry, Lisa Marie Presley
2003	Lisa Marie Presley	To Whom It May Concern	"To Whom It May Concern"	Lisa Marie Presley
2004	Anastacia	Anastacia	"Left Outside Alone"	Anastacia, Dallas Austin
2004	Anastacia	Anastacia	"Time"	Anastacia, Dallas Austin
2004	Anastacia	Anastacia	"Sick and Tired"	Anastacia, Dallas Austin
2004	Anastacia	Anastacia	"Pretty Little Dum Dum"	Anastacia, Kara DioGuardi
2004	Elisa	Pearl Days	"Joy"	Elisa
2004	Elisa	Pearl Days	"Written in Your Eyes"	Elisa
2005	O.A.R.	Stories of a Stranger	"Love and Memories"	Marc Roberge
2006	Goo Goo Dolls	Let Love In	"Stay with You"	Johnny Rzeznik
2006	Goo Goo Dolls	Let Love In	"Let Love In"	Johnny Rzeznik, Gregg Wattenberg
2006	Goo Goo Dolls	Let Love In	"Become"	Johnny Rzeznik
2007	Carina Round	Slow Motion Addict	"Ready To Confess"	Various
2007	Anouk	Who's Your Momma	"Make It Rain"	Anouk Teeuwe
2007	Anouk	Who's Your Momma	"Ball and Chain"	Anouk Teeuwe
2007	Robin Wright	Beowulf	"Gently as She Goes"	Alan Silvestri
2007	Robin Wright	Beowulf	"A Hero Comes Home" (in-film version)	Alan Silvestri
2007	Idina Menzel	Beowulf	"A Hero Comes Home"	Alan Silvestri
2008	Idina Menzel	I Stand	"I Stand"	Idina Menzel
2008	Idina Menzel	I Stand	"Better to Have Loved"	Idina Menzel
2008	Idina Menzel	I Stand	"Brave"	Idina Menzel
2008	Idina Menzel	I Stand	"Where Do I Begin"	Idina Menzel
2008	Idina Menzel	I Stand	"I Feel Everything"	Idina Menzel
2008	Idina Menzel	I Stand	"My Own Worst Enemy"	Idina Menzel
2008	Anna Vissi	Apagorevmeno	"An S'Erotefto"	Christina Aguilera, Eleana Vrahali
2009	Andrea Bocelli	A Christmas Carol	"God Bless Us Everyone"	Alan Silvestri
2009	Kelly Clarkson	All I Ever Wanted	"Long Shot"	Katy Perry, Matt Thiessen
2009	Miley Cyrus, Billy Ray Cyrus	Hannah Montana: The Movie	"Butterfly Fly Away"	Alan Silvestri
2010	Carina Round	Valentine's Day	"Every Time You Smiled"	John Debney
2010	Wilson Phillips	Christmas in Harmony	"Christmastime"	Chynna Phillips
2012	Ringo Starr	Ringo 2012	"Anthem"	Richard Starkey
2013	Owl City, Yuna	The Croods	"Shine Your Way"	Alan Silvestri
2017	Ringo Starr	Give More Love	"Electricity"	Richard Starkey

=== Production discography ===
Albums produced and co-produced by Glen Ballard.

Year	Artist	Album	Co-produced with
1985	Jack Wagner	Lighting Up the Night	Clif Magness
1989	Jon Butcher	Pictures from the Front	Jon Butcher, Spencer Proffer
1990	Wilson Phillips	Wilson Phillips	
1991	Curtis Stigers	Curtis Stigers	Danny Kortchmar
1992	Wilson Phillips	Shadows and Light	
1992	Trey Lorenz	Trey Lorenz	Walter Afanasieff, Mariah Carey, Mark Morales, Mark C. Rooney, Keith Thomas, BeBe Winans
1993	K. T. Oslin	Greatest Hits: Songs from an Aging Sex Bomb	Jim Cotton, Joe Scaife, Harold Shedd
1993	Lea Salonga	Lea Salonga	
1995	Sheena Easton	My Cherie	Various
1995	Chynna Phillips	Naked And Sacred	Various
1996	Van Halen	Best Of – Volume I	Various
1997	The Corrs	Talk On Corners	Various
1998	Alanis Morissette	Supposed Former Infatuation Junkie	Alanis Morissette
1999	The Moffatts	Chapter I: A New Beginning	Various
2000	No Doubt	Return of Saturn	Jerry Harrison, No Doubt, Matthew Wilder
2001	Bliss 66	Trip to the 13th	
2001	Dave Matthews Band	Everyday	
2001	Lit	Atomic	Lit, Don Gilmore
2001	Shelby Lynne	Love, Shelby	
2002	Christina Aguilera	Stripped	Various
2002	Sheila Nicholls	Wake	
2004	Anastacia	Anastacia	Various
2004	Elisa	Pearl Days	
2004	Katy Perry	Fingerprints (unreleased)	Katy Perry
2005	Alanis Morissette	Jagged Little Pill Acoustic	
2006	Goo Goo Dolls	Let Love In	Rob Cavallo
2006	P.O.D.	Testify	P.O.D.
2007	Anouk	Who's Your Momma	
2007	Annie Lennox	Songs of Mass Destruction	
2008	Idina Menzel	I Stand	
2008	Katy Perry	One of the Boys	Various
2008	Anna Vissi	Apagorevmeno	Various
2009	Miley Cyrus, Billy Ray Cyrus	Hannah Montana: The Movie Soundtrack	Various
2010	Wilson Phillips	Christmas in Harmony	
2011	Stevie Nicks	In Your Dreams	David A. Stewart
2012	Anastacia	It's a Man's World	
2012	Ringo Starr	Ringo 2012	Bruce Sugar
