= The One Tour (Alanis Morissette) =

2000 concert tour by Alanis Morissette

One Tour
- Tour by Alanis Morissette
- Promotional poster for the tour
- Associated album: Supposed Former Infatuation Junkie
- Start date: July 7, 2000
- End date: October 6, 2000
- Legs: 1
- No. of shows: 8 in Europe; 4 in Asia; 2 in North America; 14 in total

Alanis Morissette concert chronology
- 5 ½ Weeks Tour (1999); One Tour (2000); Toward Our Union Mended Tour (2001–03)

The One Tour was the third headlining concert tour by Canadian American recording artist, Alanis Morissette. The tour was a continuation of the previous Junkie Tour. In contrast to Alanis's previous tours, she performed in places she had never toured (or rarely toured) before across Europe, North America and parts of Asia. In each city, she selected an ambassador through a website contest on "Z.com", to show her around and teach her the culture.

The October 6 show at the Monument Valley, in Navajo Nation was filmed as a part of the Music in High Places series. The full show was released on DVD/VHS, titled Live in the Navajo Nation, on August 27, 2002.

== Setlist ==
This set list is representative of the performance in Zeebrugge. It does not represent all concerts for the duration of the tour.

1. "Building Steam with a Grain of Salt" (intro)
2. "Baba"
3. "All I Really Want"
4. "Joining You"
5. "Would Not Come"
6. "Hand in My Pocket"
7. "So Pure"
8. "Sympathetic Character"
9. "Your House"
10. "You Learn"
11. "Forgiven"
12. "That I Would Be Good"
13. "You Oughta Know"
14. "Uninvited"
  Encore 1
15. "Thank U"
16. "Wake Up"
  Encore 2
17. "One"
18. "Ironic"

== Tour dates ==
Date	City	Country	Venue
Asia
July 5, 2000	Beirut	Lebanon	La Marina
Europe
July 7, 2000^{[A]}	Mulhouse	France	Lac de Malsaucy
July 8, 2000^{[B]}	Frauenfeld	Switzerland	Grosse Allmend
July 9, 2000^{[C]}	Monza	Italy	Autodromo Nazionale Monza
July 11, 2000^{[D]}	Lucca	Italy	Piazza San Martino
July 12, 2000	Pula	Croatia	Pula Arena
July 14, 2000^{[E]}	Porto	Portugal	Vilar de Mouros
July 15, 2000^{[F]}	Zeebrugge	Belgium	De Panne
July 16, 2000	Aachen	Germany	Katschhof
Asia
July 19, 2000	Caesarea	Israel	Caesarea Amphitheater
July 20, 2000	Tel Aviv	Israel	Rishon Park
July 22, 2000	Istanbul	Turkey	Park Orman
North America
August 17, 2000	Los Angeles	United States	Museum of Tolerance
October 6, 2000	Window Rock	United States	Navajo Nation Fairgrounds

Festivals
^{A} This concert is a part of Belfort Festival
^{B} This concert is a part of Out in the Green Festival
^{C} This concert is a part of Monza Rock Festival
^{D} This concert is a part of Lucca Summer Festival
^{E} This concert is a part of Vilar de Mouros Festival
^{F} This concert is a part of Beach Festival

== Personnel ==
- Alanis Morissette – vocals/guitar/harmonica
- Joel Shearer – guitar
- Jeffrey Young – keyboards
- Nick Lashley - guitar
- Chris Chaney – bass guitar
- Gary Novak – drums
