= Junkie Tour =

1999 concert tour by Alanis Morissette

- World tour by Alanis Morissette
- Promotional poster for the tour
- Associated album: Supposed Former Infatuation Junkie
- Start date: January 30, 1999
- End date: December 18, 1999
- Legs: 10
- No. of shows: 54 in North America; 36 in Europe; 13 in Asia; 12 in Australasia; 8 in South America; 3 in Africa; 126 in total

Alanis Morissette concert chronology
- Can't Not Tour (1995–96); Junkie Tour (1999); 5 ½ Weeks Tour (1999)

The Junkie Tour was the second headlining concert tour by Canadian American recording artist, Alanis Morissette. The tour promoted her fourth studio album, Supposed Former Infatuation Junkie. Beginning in January 1999, the tour played over 100 shows in the Americas, Europe, Asia, Oceania and Africa. Morissette took a break in the tour to co-headline a North American tour with American recording artist, Tori Amos. The tour was known as the 5 ½ Weeks Tour. The tour was extended into places she had never toured in 2000, where it became known as the One Tour.

== Opening acts ==
- Liz Phair (North America—Leg 1, select dates)
- Garbage (North America—Leg 1, 2, select dates) (Australasia, select dates)
- Furslide (Europe, select dates)
- Crash Test Dummies (Canada, select dates)
- Veda Hille (Vancouver)
- Sloan (Vancouver, Calgary and Edmonton)
- Kinnie Starr (Calgary, Edmonton, Saskatoon and Ottawa)
- Limblifter
- Wide Mouth Mason (Saskatoon)
- Emm Gryner (Winnipeg)
- Birth Through Knowledge (Sudbury)
- Esthero (Toronto)
- Catherine Durand (Quebec City)
- Nancy Dumais (Montreal)
- Thrush Hermit (Saint John's)
- Joydrop (Halifax)

== Set list ==
This set list is representative of the performance in San Jose. It does not represent all concerts for the duration of the tour.

1. "Building Steam with a Grain of Salt" (intro)
2. "Baba"
3. "Would Not Come"
4. "Joining You"
5. "Hand in My Pocket"
6. "Are You Still Mad"
7. "Sympathetic Character"
8. "Perfect"
9. "You Learn"
10. "Forgiven"
11. "I Was Hoping"
12. "So Pure"
13. "That I Would Be Good"
14. "All I Really Want"
15. "You Oughta Know"
16. "Uninvited"
  Encore 1
17. "Thank U"
18. "Ironic"
  Encore 2
19. "Unsent"
20. "Heart of the House"
21. "UR"

== Tour dates ==
Date	City	Country	Venue
North America
January 30, 1999	New Orleans	United States	UNO Lakefront Arena
February 1, 1999	Atlanta	United States	Fox Theatre
February 2, 1999	Atlanta	United States	Fox Theatre
February 4, 1999	Birmingham	United States	Boutwell Memorial Auditorium
February 6, 1999	Chapel Hill	United States	Carmichael Auditorium
February 7, 1999	Richmond	United States	Landmark Theater
February 9, 1999	Fairfax	United States	Patriot Center
February 11, 1999	Amherst	United States	Mullins Center
February 12, 1999	Portland	United States	Cumberland County Civic Center
February 13, 1999	Philadelphia	United States	First Union Center
February 15, 1999	Cleveland	United States	Gund Arena
February 16, 1999	Cincinnati	United States	The Crown
February 18, 1999	Uniondale	United States	Nassau Veterans Memorial Coliseum
February 19, 1999	East Rutherford	United States	Continental Airlines Arena
February 21, 1999	University Park	United States	Bryce Jordan Center
February 22, 1999	Boston	United States	FleetCenter
Europe
March 1, 1999	London	England	Shepherd's Bush Empire
March 2, 1999	Paris	France	Le Grand Rex
North America
March 7, 1999	Minneapolis	United States	Target Center
March 9, 1999	Rosemont	United States	Rosemont Horizon
March 10, 1999	Auburn Hills	United States	The Palace of Auburn Hills
March 11, 1999	Indianapolis	United States	Market Square Arena
March 14, 1999	St. Louis	United States	Kiel Center
March 15, 1999	Kansas City	United States	Kemper Arena
March 17, 1999	Dallas	United States	Reunion Arena
March 18, 1999	Houston	United States	Compaq Center
March 21, 1999	Phoenix	United States	Blockbuster Desert Sky Pavilion
March 23, 1999	Denver	United States	McNichols Sports Arena
March 24, 1999	West Valley City	United States	E Center
March 26, 1999	Nampa	United States	Idaho Center
March 27, 1999	Yakima	United States	Yakima SunDome
March 29, 1999	Seattle	United States	KeyArena
March 30, 1999	Portland	United States	Rose Garden Arena
April 1, 1999	San Jose	United States	San Jose Arena
April 2, 1999	Las Vegas	United States	The Joint
April 3, 1999	San Diego	United States	Cox Arena at Aztec Bowl
April 6, 1999	Anaheim	United States	Arrowhead Pond of Anaheim
April 7, 1999	Los Angeles	United States	Universal Amphitheatre
Asia
April 18, 1999	Yokohama	Japan	Kanagawa Prefectural Civic Hall
April 19, 1999	Osaka	Japan	Osaka-jō Hall
April 21, 1999	Fukuoka	Japan	Fukuoka Sunpalace
April 23, 1999	Nagoya	Japan	Century Hall
April 24, 1999	Tokyo	Japan	Nippon Budokan
April 25, 1999	Tokyo	Japan	Nippon Budokan
North America
May 2, 1999	Vancouver	Canada	General Motors Place
May 4, 1999	Calgary	Canada	Canadian Airlines Saddledome
May 5, 1999	Edmonton	Canada	Skyreach Centre
May 6, 1999	Saskatoon	Canada	Saskatchewan Place
May 8, 1999	Winnipeg	Canada	Winnipeg Arena
May 10, 1999	Sudbury	Canada	Sudbury Community Arena
May 11, 1999	Toronto	Canada	Air Canada Centre
May 13, 1999	Quebec City	Canada	Colisée de Québec
May 14, 1999	Ottawa	Canada	Corel Centre
May 15, 1999	Montreal	Canada	Molson Centre
May 17, 1999	Saint John	Canada	Harbour Station
May 18, 1999	Halifax	Canada	Halifax Metro Centre
Europe
May 22, 1999^{[A]}	Nuremberg	Germany	Zeppelinfeld
May 23, 1999^{[B]}	Nürburg	Germany	Nürburgring
May 24, 1999	Landgraaf	Netherlands	Megaland Landgraaf
May 26, 1999	Rotterdam	Netherlands	Rotterdam Ahoy
May 27, 1999	Oberhausen	Germany	Arena Oberhausen
May 28, 1999	Hanover	Germany	Stadionsporthalle
May 30, 1999	Copenhagen	Denmark	Forum Copenhagen
May 31, 1999	Oslo	Norway	Oslo Spektrum
June 2, 1999	Helsinki	Finland	Hartwall Areena
June 3, 1999	Gothenburg	Sweden	Scandinavium
June 5, 1999	Stockholm	Sweden	Stockholm Globe Arena
June 8, 1999	Kiel	Germany	Ostseehalle
June 9, 1999	Berlin	Germany	Velodrom
June 10, 1999	Dresden	Germany	Junge Garde
June 13, 1999^{[C]}	Amsterdam	Netherlands	Parkhal RAI
June 14, 1999	Brussels	Belgium	Forest National
June 15, 1999	Paris	France	Zénith de Paris
June 16, 1999	Basel	Switzerland	St. Jakobshalle
June 19, 1999^{[D]}	Prague	Czech Republic	Kemp Džbán
June 20, 1999	Vienna	Austria	Wiener Stadthalle
June 22, 1999	Rome	Italy	Ex mattatoio
June 23, 1999	Milan	Italy	FilaForum di Assago
June 25, 1999	Marseille	France	Le Dôme de Marseille
June 26, 1999	Toulouse	France	Zénith de Toulouse
June 28, 1999	Madrid	Spain	Sala Riviera
June 29, 1999	Lisbon	Portugal	Pavilhão Atlântico
July 7, 1999	Newcastle	England	Telewest Arena
July 8, 1999	Manchester	England	Manchester Evening News Arena
July 9, 1999	Birmingham	England	NEC Arena
July 11, 1999	Dublin	Ireland	Point Theatre
July 12, 1999	Dublin	Ireland	Point Theatre
July 14, 1999	London	England	Wembley Arena
July 15, 1999	London	England	Wembley Arena
July 17, 1999^{[E]}	Montreux	Switzerland	Auditorium Stravinski
North America
July 23, 1999^{[F]}	Rome	United States	Griffiss Air Force Base
Oceania
October 1, 1999	Auckland	New Zealand	Mount Smart Supertop
October 2, 1999	Wellington	New Zealand	Queens Wharf Events Centre
October 5, 1999	Perth	Australia	Perth Entertainment Centre
October 7, 1999	Adelaide	Australia	Adelaide Entertainment Centre
October 8, 1999	Melbourne	Australia	Centre Court
October 9, 1999	Melbourne	Australia	Centre Court
October 11, 1999	Sydney	Australia	Sydney Super Dome
October 13, 1999	Canberra	Australia	AIS Arena
October 14, 1999	Sydney	Australia	Sydney Entertainment Centre
October 15, 1999	Wollongong	Australia	WIN Entertainment Centre
October 16, 1999	Wollongong	Australia	WIN Entertainment Centre
October 18, 1999	Brisbane	Australia	Brisbane Entertainment Centre
Asia
October 20, 1999	Pasay	Philippines	Folk Arts Theater
October 22, 1999	Bangkok	Thailand	Thailand Cultural Centre
October 24, 1999	Wan Chai	Hong Kong	Hong Kong Convention and Exhibition Centre
October 26, 1999	Seoul	South Korea	Olympic Gymnastics Arena
October 28, 1999	Shah Alam	Malaysia	Stadium Melawati
October 29, 1999	Telok Blangah	Singapore	Harbour Pavilion
November 1, 1999	Jakarta	Indonesia	BSJCC Plenary Hall
North America
November 11, 1999	Mexico City	Mexico	Auditorio Nacional
November 13, 1999	Mexico City	Mexico	Auditorio Nacional
South America
November 18, 1999	Caracas	Venezuela	Poliedro de Caracas
November 21, 1999	Montevideo	Uruguay	Velódromo Municipal de Montevideo
November 22, 1999	Buenos Aires	Argentina	Luna Park
November 23, 1999	Buenos Aires	Argentina	Luna Park
November 25, 1999	Santiago	Chile	Teatro Monumental
November 27, 1999	São Paulo	Brazil	Credicard Hall
November 28, 1999	São Paulo	Brazil	Credicard Hall
November 29, 1999	Rio de Janeiro	Brazil	Metropolitan
Africa
December 3, 1999	North West Province	South Africa	Sun City Sundome
December 5, 1999	Bellville	South Africa	Bellville Velodrome
December 7, 1999	Durban	South Africa	Kings Park Stadium
North America
December 14, 1999	Los Angeles	United States	Palace Theater
December 15, 1999^{[G]}	Boston	United States	Avalon
December 18, 1999	San Juan	Puerto Rico	Coliseo Roberto Clemente

Festivals and other miscellaneous performances
^{A} Rock im Park
^{B} Rock am Ring
^{C} Tibetan Freedom Concert
^{D} E.T. Go Jam
^{E} Montreux Jazz Festival
^{F} Woodstock 1999
^{G} Kiss 108 Jingle Ball

Cancellations and rescheduled shows

June 18, 1999	Ljubljana, Slovenia	Tivoli Hall	Cancelled
November 11, 1999	Mexico City, Mexico	Hard Rock Cafe Ciudad de Mexico	Moved to the Auditorio Nacional
November 16, 1999	San Juan, Puerto Rico	Anfiteatro Luis Muñoz Marín	Rescheduled to December 18, 1999 and moved to the Coliseo Roberto Clemente

== Band ==
- Guitar: Nick Lashley and Joel Shearer
- Bass guitar: Chris Chaney
- Drums: Gary Novak
- Keyboards: Deron Johnson
