= MTV Unplugged (Alanis Morissette album) =

Live album by Alanis Morissette
- Released: November 9, 1999
- Recorded: September 18, 1999; MTV Unplugged at the Brooklyn Academy of Music, New York
- Genre: Acoustic rock
- Length: 53:42
- Labels: Maverick; Reprise
- Producer: Alanis Morissette

Alanis Morissette chronology
Supposed Former Infatuation Junkie (1998)	MTV Unplugged (1999)	Under Rug Swept (2002)

Singles from MTV Unplugged
- 1. "That I Would Be Good" Released: November 1999; 2. "You Learn" Released: 1999 (France and Europe); 3. "King of Pain" Released: April 19, 2000

Professional ratings
Review scores
Source	Rating
AllMusic	3/5 stars
Entertainment Weekly	B−
NOW Toronto	3/5 stars
Q	(2-star Honorable Mention)
Robert Christgau	(1-star Honorable Mention)
Rolling Stone	2.5/5 stars
Select	5/5 stars
The Harvard Crimson	B

MTV Unplugged is the first live album by Canadian singer-songwriter Alanis Morissette, released by Maverick Records in the United States on November 9, 1999 (see 1999 in music). It comprises songs performed by Morissette on the television program MTV Unplugged. Twelve tracks were included on the album, but Morissette also performed "Baba", "Thank U" (both from 1998's Supposed Former Infatuation Junkie) and "Your House" (the hidden track on 1995's Jagged Little Pill) during the live taping. These were later released as B-sides on the "King of Pain" single release. The first single, "That I Would Be Good", was moderately successful, and two other tracks, "King of Pain" (a cover of the song by The Police) and "You Learn" were released as singles outside North America. As of March 2012, the album has sold 673,000 copies in the U.S.

In addition to material from Morissette's first two U.S. albums, MTV Unplugged featured performances of "No Pressure over Cappuccino" and "Princes Familiar", two previously unreleased songs from her tours, and "These R the Thoughts", a previously released b-side. Morissette has stated that "Princes Familiar" in particular is one of her favorite and most vocally challenging songs. She performed it on her 2005 Diamond Wink Tour, where she dedicated it to "all of the dads in the audience." The ballad "No Pressure over Cappuccino", one of the first songs she wrote following the release of Jagged Little Pill, "was inspired by [her] twin brother," Wade.

Featuring cleaner vocals, slower arrangements and a few drastic reinventions (particularly in the case of "You Oughta Know"), MTV Unplugged foreshadowed much of Morissette's later, softer work, particularly 2005's Jagged Little Pill Acoustic and the accompanying Diamond Wink Tour.

== Track listing ==
All lyrics are written by Alanis Morissette; all music is composed by Alanis Morissette and Glen Ballard, except where noted.

No.	Title	Length
1.	"You Learn"	4:22
2.	"Joining You"	5:09
3.	"No Pressure Over Cappuccino" (Morissette, Nick Lashley)	4:41
4.	"That I Would Be Good"	4:14
5.	"Head over Feet"	4:23
6.	"Princes Familiar"	4:37
7.	"I Was Hoping"	4:54
8.	"Ironic"	4:14
9.	"These R the Thoughts"	3:26
10.	"King of Pain" (lyrics and music: Sting)	4:05
11.	"You Oughta Know"	5:00
12.	"Uninvited" (Alanis Morissette)	4:37
Total length:		53:42

== Personnel ==
- Alanis Morissette – vocals, guitar, harmonica and flute
- Nick Lashley – guitar
- Joel Shearer – guitar
- Deron Johnson – keyboards, background vocals in "King of Pain"
- Chris Chaney – bass
- Gary Novak – drums and percussion
- Chris Fogel – mixing
- Brad Dutz – percussion
- David Campbell – musical arranger and viola
- Suzie Katayama – cello and string arrangement for "You Oughta Know"
- Joel Derouin – violin
- Laura Seaton – violin
- Erik Friedlander – cello
- Juliet Haffner – strings contractor

== Charts ==
=== Weekly charts ===
Weekly chart performance for MTV Unplugged
Chart (1999–2000)	Peak position
Australian Albums (ARIA)	101
Austrian Albums (Ö3 Austria)	5
Belgian Albums (Ultratop Flanders)	10
Belgian Albums (Ultratop Wallonia)	41
Canada Top Albums/CDs (RPM)	42
Dutch Albums (Album Top 100)	4
European Top 100 Albums (Music & Media)	6
French Albums (SNEP)	21
German Albums (Offizielle Top 100)	5
Italian Albums (FIMI)	6
Norwegian Albums (VG-lista)	6
Portuguese Albums (AFP)	1
Scottish Albums (Official Charts)	88
Swedish Albums (Sverigetopplistan)	56
Swiss Albums (Schweizer Hitparade)	4
UK Albums (Official Charts)	56
US Billboard 200	63

=== Year-end charts ===
1999 year-end chart performance for MTV Unplugged
Chart (1999)	Position
Dutch Albums (Album Top 100)	63

2000 year-end chart performance for MTV Unplugged
Chart (2000)	Position
Belgian Albums (Ultratop Flanders)	67
Dutch Albums (Album Top 100)	25
German Albums (Offizielle Top 100)	80
Swiss Albums (Schweizer Hitparade)	44

== Certifications ==
Certifications and sales for MTV Unplugged
Region	Certification	Certified units/sales
Austria (IFPI Austria)	Gold	25,000^{*}
Belgium (BRMA)	Gold	25,000^{*}
Brazil (Pro-Música Brasil)	Platinum	250,000^{*}
France (SNEP)	Gold	100,000^{*}
Germany (BVMI)	Platinum	300,000^{^}
Italy (FIMI)	Gold	50,000^{*}
Netherlands (NVPI)	Platinum	100,000^{^}
Spain (Promusicae)	13× Platinum	1,300,000^{^}
Switzerland (IFPI Switzerland)	Gold	25,000^{^}
United Kingdom (BPI)	Gold	100,000^{^}
United States (RIAA)	Gold	500,000^{^}
Summaries
Europe (IFPI)	Platinum	1,000,000^{*}
^{*} Sales figures based on certification alone.^{^} Shipments figures based on certification alone.
