= The One Tour =

The One Tour may refer to:

- The One Tour, a 1992/93 tour by Elton John.
- The One Tour, a 2000 tour by Alanis Morissette.
