= Jon Butcher Axis (album) =

Studio album by Jon Butcher Axis
- Released: 1983
- Recorded: Electric Lady Studios, New York City and Rockfield Studios, Monmouth, South Wales
- Genre: Blues, rock
- Length: 33:35
- Label: Polydor/Polygram
- Producer: Pat Moran

Jon Butcher Axis chronology
Jon Butcher Axis (1983)	Stare at the Sun (1984)

Jon Butcher Axis is the eponymous debut studio album by Jon Butcher Axis, released in 1983 on Polydor/PolyGram Records. The single "Life Takes a Life" reached number 26 on the Billboard Mainstream Rock chart. The album reached number 91 on the Billboard Pop Albums chart.

== Reception ==
Professional ratings
Review scores
Source	Rating
Allmusic	4/5 stars

Christopher Hill of Record gave the album a rave review. He lauded the new band as having "solid, muscular power without a trace of bluster or plod; rhythm and nuance with nary a synthesizer fillip; a nourishing awareness of rock history without power pop or rockabilly affectation; accessibility without MOR superficiality." While he found the opening track "Life Takes a Life" too smooth and commercialized, he said the entirety of side two was brilliant, giving special praise to the irresistible rhythm and backbeat of "New Man", the yearning folk rock of "Send One, Care Of", and the tongue-in-cheek sexual tones of "Walk Like This". He was also impressed with Derek Blevins's "precise but inventive" drumming.

== Track listing ==
All songs written by Jon Butcher except where noted.

1. "Life Takes a Life" (Jon Butcher, Chris Martin) – 3:50
2. "It's Only Words" – 3:00
3. "Ocean in Motion" – 2:50
4. "Can't Be the Only Fool" – 3:28
5. "Sentinel" (Butcher, Derek Blevins, Martin) – 3:20
6. "New Man" – 3:10
7. "Fairlight" – 3:20
8. "Send One, Care Of" – 3:42
9. "Walk Like This" – 3:00
10. "We Will Be as One" – 3:55

== Personnel ==
- Jon Butcher – guitar, vocals
- Derek Blevins – drums
- Chris Martin - bass
