= Wishes (Jon Butcher album) =

Studio album by Jon Butcher
- Released: 1987
- Genre: Hard rock
- Length: 44:12
- Label: Capitol
- Producer: Spencer Proffer, Jon Butcher

Jon Butcher chronology
Along the Axis (1985)	Wishes (1987)	Pictures from the Front (1989)

Professional ratings
Review scores
Source	Rating
Allmusic	3.5/5 stars

Wishes is an album by hard rock singer Jon Butcher. It was released in 1987 by Capitol Records. The album peaked at No. 77 on the Billboard 200. The singles of this album were "Wishes", "Goodbye Saving Grace" and "Holy War".

== Track listing ==
1. "Goodbye Saving Grace"
2. "Living for Tomorrow"
3. "Holy War"
4. "Wishes"
5. "Churinga"
6. "Long Way Home"
7. "Show Me Some Emotion"
8. "Little Bit of Magic"
9. "Angel Dressed in Blue"
10. "Partners in Crime"
11. "Prisoners of the Silver Chain"

== Chart positions ==
=== Album ===
Chart (1987)	Peak position
US (Billboard 200)	77

=== Singles ===
Single	Year	Chart	Position
"Goodbye Saving Grace"	1987	US (Billboard Mainstream Rock)	7
"Holy War"	1987	US (Billboard Mainstream Rock)	25
"Wishes"	1987	US (Billboard Mainstream Rock)	42
