= Jon Butcher =

American rock musician

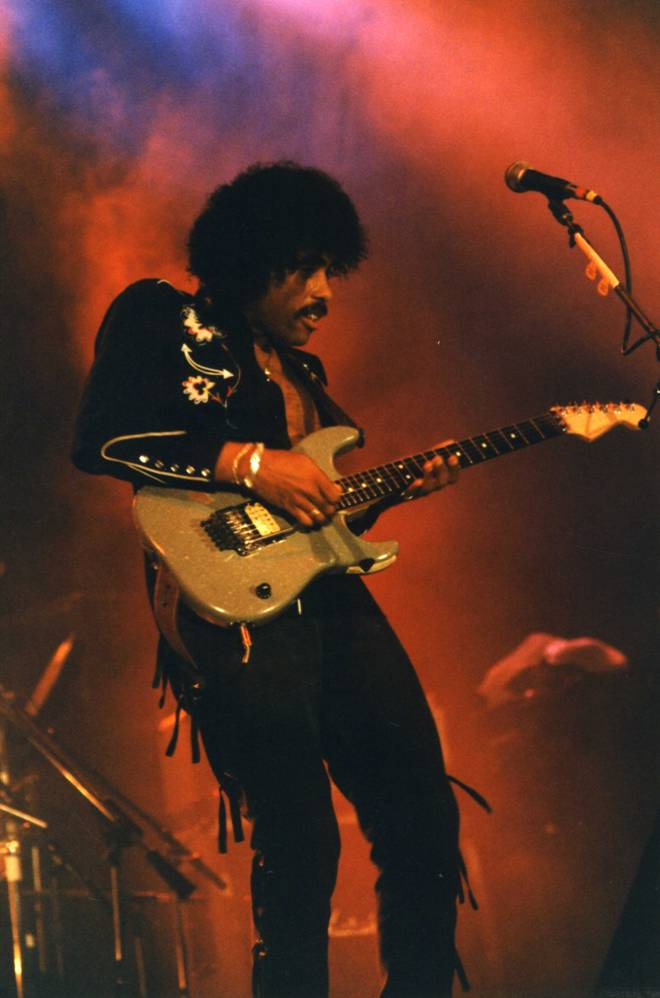

Background information
- Origin: Philadelphia, Pennsylvania, U.S.
- Genres: Rock, blues
- Occupations: Musician, songwriter, record producer
- Years active: 1970s–present
- Website: Official website

Jon Butcher (born 1955/1956) is an American rock, blues songwriter, guitarist and freelance multimedia producer.

== Influences ==
Many people have made comparisons between Jon Butcher and Jimi Hendrix particularly in the early stages of Butcher's career. These comparisons were fueled by Butcher's onstage appearance and mannerisms, patterned after Hendrix, and his choice for the band name Axis, a reference to Hendrix album Axis: Bold as Love. Butcher's stated influences are Richie Havens, John Lennon, Phil Lynott, Bob Dylan, and Taj Mahal, and he maintains that the Hendrix comparisons are superficial, saying "... outside of the surface aspect, I don’t think there was much about me that was Jimi Hendrix-like, if you disregard the fact that I’m black and play a Stratocaster."

== Johanna Wild ==
During the middle to late 1970s, Butcher toured the Northeast U.S. with the Boston-based band Johanna Wild. Other band members were Jeff Linscott (guitar), Derek Blevins (drums) and Troy Douglas Sutler III (bass). Their song, "Suzanne" was played on local radio stations such as WBCN. Johanna Wild opened for Foghat at the Alosa Civic Center in Concord, New Hampshire on May 2, 1977.

== Jon Butcher Axis ==
Butcher appeared on MTV and radio station WBCN in Boston, Massachusetts. He formed Jon Butcher Axis with Sandy Higgins (guitar), Chris Martin (bass) and former Johanna Wild drummer Derek Blevins and the band opened for Kiss in Fort Worth, Texas) in October 1979. Soon after, Higgins left to be the front man for Balloon, while Charlie Farren fronted the Mk3 lineup of The Joe Perry Project. Later Axis became a power trio and performed throughout New England.

== American tour opening for The J. Geils Band ==
Jon Butcher Axis has toured with J. Geils Band on their 1982 Freeze Frame American tour. Jon Butcher Axis secured an international record deal with PolyGram Records which led to the albums The Jon Butcher Axis and Stare at the Sun, both produced by Pat Moran, who produced for Robert Plant, Edie Brickell and Lou Gramm.

== 1983 ==
1983 saw the release of their first and self-titled album, Jon Butcher Axis, featuring "Life Takes A Life". Other notable tracks included "Ocean in Motion" and "Walk Like This". This album reached No. 91 in the Billboard Pop Albums chart and Jon Butcher Axis's video "Life Takes a Life" became one of the few videos by a black artist to receive airtime on MTV. At that time, the following black artists had appeared on MTV: Tina Turner, Prince, Michael Jackson, Eddy Grant, Musical Youth and the Busboys. The band's second album, Stare at the Sun (1984), reached No. 160 on the Billboard album chart. The result of these two albums' successes afforded further growing popularity for the band, which added the opportunity to tour with Rush ('Signals' tour '83), Def Leppard ('Pyromania' tour '83) and Scorpions ('Hurricane' tour '84), among others.

== 1985–1986 ==
In 1985, Jon Butcher Axis signed with Capitol Records and released Along the Axis. The track, "The Ritual", earned multiple writers in the band a Grammy Nomination for Best Rock Instrumental Performance. On that same album, singles and videos were released for the songs "The Sounds of Your Voice" and "Stop". "The Sounds of Your Voice" (written by band member Thom Gimbel) was the only single to hit the Billboard charts Hot 100 reaching No. 94. Quotes Jon, "The Capitol Records experience was a positive one. Jon Butcher Axis frequently toured major venues across the US during this period, opening for INXS".

== 1987–1989 ==
The following releases, Wishes (1987) and Pictures from the Front (1989) were simply recorded under the Jon Butcher name. Wishes was Butcher's most successful album. Rumored to have achieved Gold Award status, there is no evidence of this on the RIAA database. MTV videos released from both of these records included "Holy War", "Goodbye Saving Grace" and "Wishes".

== Barefoot Servants ==
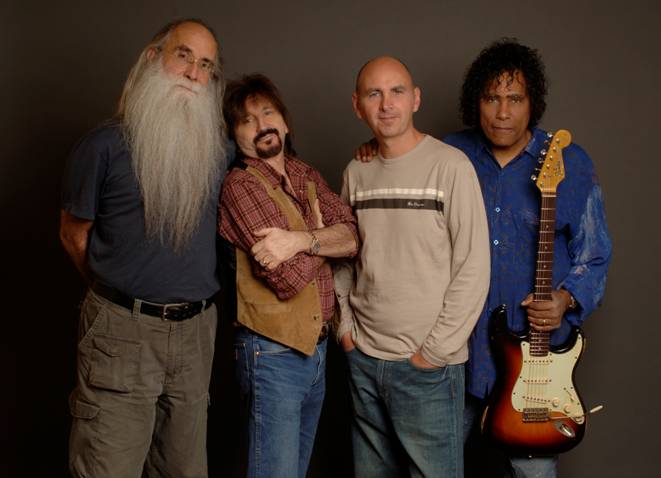
Barefoot Servants line-up

In 1991, Jon Butcher Axis ended its run. Jon Butcher himself spent most of the '90s on various multimedia projects. In 1994, he formed Barefoot Servants which released their self-titled album on Epic Records. The band included Leland Sklar (bass), Ben Schultz (guitar) and Ray Brinker (drums). Their second record, Barefoot Servants 2 was released by Atom Records in August 2005. Drummer Ray Brinker was replaced by Londoner Neal Wilkinson.

== Solo endeavors ==
In the mid 1990s, Butcher released two solo blues albums, Positively the Blues and Electric Factory, a title loosely derived from Jimi Hendrix's Electric Ladyland. In 1998, Razor & Tie released The Best of Jon Butcher – Dreamers Would Ride. In November 2000, Butcher released a CD exclusively through his web site A Long Way Home. A Stiff Little Breeze was released on Atom Records in 2001 and was Jon's first solo project with the independent label. This CD resurrected the Jon Butcher Axis name, and again the Hendrix reference. 2002 brought an additional Jon Butcher Axis release, An Ocean in Motion – Live in Boston 1984. Jon joined the Chris Pierce band in 2008 as guitarist and released a live CD Live at the Hotel Cafe. Jon is currently working on Chris' third studio release.

== Video ==
Butcher's first DVD video release came in 2004. Live at the Casbah was filmed in December 1984 at The Casbah concert venue in Manchester, New Hampshire. It contains several never-released songs, and additional music from his first three Jon Butcher Axis releases.

== Multimedia projects ==
In addition to touring all over the United States and other countries to support various incarnations of both Jon Butcher Axis and Barefoot Servants, Butcher created his own production company and state of the art recording studio "Electric Factory" located in the San Fernando Hills of California. In addition to providing music production services for recording artists, Butcher through his company "Electric Factory Music" spends a great amount of his time scoring music for television, film and computer gaming. Recent projects include music for the HBO series Deadwood and A&E's The Life and Times of Wild Bill Cody, The Hughleys (UPN), The Unit (CBS), Ugly Betty (ABC), Star Trek: The Next Generation (UPN), My Name Is Earl (NBC), and Hendrix: The Movie (Wood Harris).

== Discography ==
=== Albums ===
| Year | Album | Tracks | Credits | Billboard | Review |
|---|---|---|---|---|---|
| 1983 | Jon Butcher Axis; Label – Polydor; Producer – Pat Moran | 1. "Life Takes a Life"; 2. "It's Only Words"; 3. "Ocean in Motion"; 4. "Can't Be the Only Fool"; 5. "Sentinel"; 6. "New Man"; 7. "Fairlight"; 8. "Send One Care Of"; 9. "Walk Like This"; 10. "We Will Be as One" | Derek Blevins – drums Jon Butcher – guitar, vocals Christopher Martin – bass Pat Moran – producer, engineer | 91 | |
| 1984 | Stare at the Sun; Label – Polydor; Producer – Pat Moran | 1. "Wind It Up"; 2. "Victims"; 3. "Dreams Fade Away"; 4. "Stay Low"; 5. "Can't Tell the Dancer from the Dance"; 6. "Don't Say Goodnight"; 7. "Walk on the Moon"; 8. "Call to Arms"; 9. "Eros Arriving"; 10. "Breakout" | Derek Blevins – drums Jon Butcher – guitar, vocals Christopher Martin – bass Pat Moran – producer, engineer | 160 | |
| 1985 | Along the Axis; Label - Capitol; Producer - Spencer Proffer | 1. "Stop!" (4:14); 2. "Electricity" (3:35); 3. "Sounds of Your Voice" (3:38); 4. "Only the Fox" (4:07); 5. "Along the Axis" (3:40); 6. "Two Hearts Running" (4:29); 7. "I've Got Money" (3:45); 8. "Between the Lines" (4:38); 9. "Carrie" (3:34); 10. "That's How Strong My Love Is" (3:29); 11. "The Ritual (Instrumental)" (3:11) | Randy Bishop - Vocals; Derek Blevins - Drums; Larry Brown - percussion Jon Butcher - Guitar, Percussion, Arranger, Vocals, Vocals (Background); Ava Cherry - Vocals; Thom Gimbel - Guitar, Arranger, Horn, Keyboards, Vocals, Vocals (Background), Maxtone; Hanspeter Huber - Engineer; Jimmy Johnson - Bass; Moneygrabbers - Vocals; Spencer Proffer - Arranger, Producer | 66 | |
| 1987 | Wishes; Label - Capitol; Producer - Spencer Proffer | 1. "Goodbye Saving Grace"; 2. "Living for Tomorrow"; 3. "Holy War"; 4. "Wishes"; 5. "Churinga [Instrumental]"; 6. "Long Way Home"; 7. "Show Me Some Emotion"; 8. "Little Bit of Magic"; 9. "Angel Dressed in Blue"; 10. "Partners in Crime"; 11. "Prisoners of the Silver Chain" | Derek Blevins - Percussion, Drums; Jon Butcher - Bass, Guitar, Percussion, Vocals; Thom Gimbel - Horn, Keyboards; Hanspeter Huber - Engineer; Rob Jefferies - Bass; Spencer Proffer - Producer | 77 | |
| 1989 | Pictures from the Front; Label - Capitol; Producer - Glen Ballard | 1. "I'm Only Dreaming"; 2. "Might As Well Be Free"; 3. "Live Or Die"; 4. "99 (May Be All You Need)"; 5. "Beating Drum"; 6. "The Mission"; 7. "Send Me Somebody"; 8. "Division Street"; 9. "Come And Get It"; 10. "Waiting For A Miracle" | Glen Ballard - Keyboards, Producer; Jon Butcher - Guitar, Vocals; Jammin' James Carter - Bass, Vocals; Thom Gimbel - Guitar, Horn, Keyboards, Vocals; Jamie Hunting - Bass; Ronnie Lee Sage - Percussion, Drums, Vocals; Timothy B. Schmit - Vocals | 121 | |
| 1995 | Positively the Blues; Label - Blues Bureau International; Producers - Ben Schultz, Jon Butcher | 1. "Cadillac Limousine" (2:54); 2. "Clean-Up Time" (6:52); 3. "Taxman Blues" (3:39); 4. "Union Hall" (2:19); 5. "Honey Bee" (3:47); 6. "Here I Am" (2:54); 7. "20 Years" (3:47); 8. "I Hate Myself" (3:00); 9. "At the Feet of the Master" (5:53); 10. "Two Penny Nail" (4:13); 11. "High Heel Shoes" (4:07)"; 12. "Sail On" (1:44) | Jon Butcher - Dobro, Guitar, Vocals, Producer; Ben Schultz - Guitar, Keyboards, Producer, Engineer, Slide Guitar | - | |
| 1996 | Electric Factory; Label - Blues Bureau International; Producer - Jon Butcher | 1. "Rocket Ship" (6:25); 2. "Chili Sauce" (6:23); 3. "Rather Go Fishin'" (3:14); 4. "Cactus Flower" (7:08); 5. "A Sea of Blues" (5:04); 6. "The Fireman's Ball" (3:19); 7. "Gambler" (5:07); 8. "Yes, She Does" (3:45); 9. "Brian's Electric Factory" (5:24); 10. "The Coleman Mine" (1:04); 11. "By Railroad Line" (3:24) | Jon Butcher - Multi Instruments, Producer; Kelly Rucker - Harmonica; Ben Schultz - Multi Instruments, Engineer, Mixing | - | |
| 1998 | The Best of Jon Butcher: Dreamers Would Ride (compilation); Label - Razor & Tie | 1. "Might as Well Be Free" (4:32); 2. "Life Takes a Life" (3:54); 3. " Goodbye Saving Grace" (4:16); 4. "Holy War" (4:11); 5. "Don't Say Goodnight" (3:23); 6. "Stop" (4:11); 7. "Sounds of Your Voice" (3:41); 8. "Waiting for a Miracle" (5:19); 9. "May This Be Love" (3:08); 10. "Wishes" (4:01); 11. "The Ritual" (2:57); 12. "Whiskey River" (3:47); 13. "If I Love You" (1:42); 14. "Send Me Somebody" (4:07); 15. "This Raging Fire" (4:10); 16. "It's Only Words" (Live) (3:48); 17. "Division Street" (4:45) | | - | |
| 1999 | Live on the King Biscuit Flower Hour; Label - King Biscuit Flower Hour; Producer - Joe Pheifer | 1. "Writing on the Wall" (3:40); 2. "Life Takes a Life" (5:01); 3. "Long Way Home" (4:27); 4. "American Dream" (3:59); 5. "Goodbye Saving Grace" (7:25); 6. "Heaven" (6:43); 7. "Wishes" (3:59); 8. "Fire Down the Well" (7:09); 9. "Holy War" (4:34); 10. "Higher Ground" (5:26); 11. "Interview With Jon Butcher" (12:09) | Jon Butcher - Main Performer; Kevin Flaherty - Executive Producer; Len Handler - Executive Producer; Joe Pheifer - Producer; Kevin T. Cain - Executive Producer | - | |
| 2001 | Stiff Little Breeze; Label - Orchard; Producer - John Butcher | 1. "Stiff Little Breeze" (2:43); 2. "Tie the Devil Down" (3:37); 3. "Red House" (4:39); 4. "The Tiger in the Tall Grass" (4:42); 5. "Big Guitars" (3:29); 6. "Love Is a River" (3:35); 7. "Bats" (1:27); 8. "High Road to Heaven" (3:17); 9. "Money" (3:35); 10. "The Dreamer" (3:13); 11. "Wicked Woman" (3:57); 12. "A Light Texas Rain" (2:14); 13. "When the Heart Beats Once" (3:14); 14. "Beal St." (1:26) | Jon Butcher - Producer, Engineer; Jeff Clark - Engineer; Larry Mah - Mastering | - | |
| 2002 | An Ocean In Motion: Live In Boston 1984; Label - Atom; Producer - John Butcher | 1. "Ocean in Motion" (2:54); 2. "Victims" (4:56); 3. "Life Takes a Life" (4:42); 4. "Fairlight" (4:42); 5. "Sentinel" (6:24); 6. "Walk Like This" (3:15); 7. "Walk on the Moon" (5:23); 8. "New Man" (4:46)"; 9. "It's Only Words" (3:30); 10. "Not Fade Away" (3:11); 11. "Don't Say Goodnight" (4:28) | Derek Blevins - Percussion, Drums; Jon Butcher - Guitar, Vocals, Producer, Liner Notes, Graphic Design, Art Direction; Thom Gimbel - Keyboards, Saxophone, Vocals (Background); Larry Mah - Mastering | - | |
| 2004 | American Dream (reissue of the KBFH album); Label - Disky; Producer - John Butcher | 1. "American Dream"; 2. "Fire Down The Well"; 3. "Higher Ground"; 4. "Long Way Home"; 5. "Writing On The Wall"; 6. "Holy War"; 7. "Heaven"; 8. "Life Takes A Life"; 9. "Wishes"; 10. "Goodbye Saving Grace" | Derek Blevins - Percussion, Drums; Jon Butcher - Guitar, Vocals, Producer, Liner Notes, Graphic Design, Art Direction; Thom Gimbel - Keyboards, Saxophone, Vocals (Background); Larry Mah - Mastering | - | |
| 2016 | 2 Roads East; Label - Electric Factory | 1. "Transcendence"; 2. "Power Of Soul"; 3. "Madness"; 4. "Without You: 5. "Same Old Heart"; 6. "How Does It Feel"; 7. "Brontosaurus"; 8. "Dust"; 9. "2 Roads East"; 10. "Path Of Life" | | | |
| 2018 | 360° | 1. "Intro"; 2. "360°"; 3. "The Season"; 4. "Breathe"; 5. "Grow Old With Me"; 6. "Water on Europa"; 7. "USB"; 8. "The Coalman Mine" | John Anthony - Drums; Jon Butcher - Guitar, Vocals; John Cameron - Piano; Allen Estes - Banjo, Mandolin; Tom Guerra - Guitar; Jared Holaday - Clarinet, Saxophone; Jeff Keithline - Bass; Peter Koeplin - Drums; Megan Wolf - Backing Vocals | - | |
| 2021 | Special Day | 1. "Devil's Train"; 2. "Special Day"; 3. "Kiss The Sky"; 4. "Senior Garcia"; 5. "Kalena"; 6. "Still Crazy After All These Years"; 7. "Little Things"; 8. "Make A Little Room"; 9. "How Does It Feel"; 10. "Architect Of Peace" | | | |

=== Singles ===
| Year | Single | The Billboard Hot 100 | Mainstream Rock Tracks | Album |
|---|---|---|---|---|
| 1983 | Life Takes A Life | - | 26 | Jon Butcher Axis |
| 1983 | Don't Say Goodnight | - | 24 | Stare at the Sun |
| 1985 | Stop | - | 31 | Along the Axis |
| 1985 | Sounds of Your Voice | 94 | - | Along the Axis |
| 1987 | Goodbye Saving Grace | - | 7 | Wishes |
| 1987 | Holy War | - | 25 | Wishes |
| 1987 | Wishes | - | 42 | Wishes |
| 1989 | Send Me Somebody | - | 7 | Pictures from the Front |
| 1989 | Might as Well Be Free | - | 38 | Pictures from the Front |
