= Sheila Nicholls =

British musician

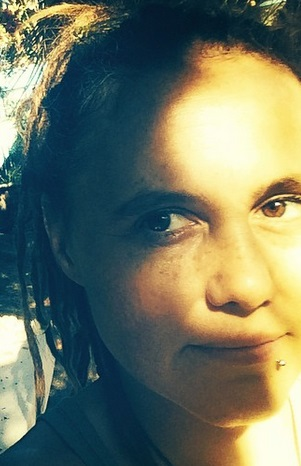
Nicholls in 2014

Sheila Elizabeth Nicholls (born 9 February 1970) is an English singer and songwriter now residing in Highland Park, Los Angeles.

== Early years ==
While growing up, Nicholls attended Felsted School. She first found fame for performing cartwheels while streaking at an England vs. Australia cricket match at Lord's in May 1989, in which she joined fellow school players Derek Pringle and John Stephenson on the field of play; this footage was later included in the video Streaker, narrated by George Best.

== Career ==
Nicholls travelled to the United States later in 1989 and began performing with her band, Sheila Nicholls and the Splendid Frock, in New York City in the mid-1990s. She then moved to Los Angeles where she recorded a solo album, the critically acclaimed Brief Strop (1999), and started her own label, Essex Girl Records.

Shortly thereafter, Nicholls signed a deal with Hollywood Records, which began distributing Brief Strop. The song "Fallen for You," from the album, became a hit on college radio stations and found its way onto the best-selling soundtrack for the movie High Fidelity. She toured extensively with the album, including several gigs alongside k.d. lang.

"After some moral deliberations about taking Disney blood money... I negotiated a deal in which I asked for final creative say across the board and the full ownership of my master copies, both of which I got."

In mid-2002, Nicholls released her second album, Wake, in which she worked with producers Glen Ballard and Jez Colin. The album's first single, "Faith," co-written with Ballard, received ample radio play and reached the pop chart. Nicholls third album, Songs From the Bardo, was released in August 2009. "After releasing two albums with Hollywood Records, I decided to lay low for a minute. I built a studio, bought equipment, and taught myself ProTools. I really wanted to expand my abilities and have more creative independence. Consequently this record took a while because I did it myself, with some help from friends. Oh and I also had a baby."

In 2018, Nicholls released her fourth album, All of Nature.

== Personal life ==
Sheila has one daughter, born in 2007.

In 2011, she spent two months with Occupy Los Angeles, camping outside City Hall and appearing in NPR's coverage.

== Discography ==
- Brief Strop
  - Released: 16 November 1999, Label: Essex Girl
1. "Question' (3:53)
2. "Elevator" (4:19)
3. "Hannah" (5:15)
4. "Eiderdown" (4:20)
5. "Fallen For You" (3:16)
6. "Peanuts" (5:34)
7. "Don't Die on the Vine" (3:50)
8. "Medusa" (3:38)
9. "Patience" (3:09)
10. "Perfection" (4:22)
11. "War Isn't Working" (2:17)
12. "So One Day" (2:32)
13. "Rapunzel" (3:32)
14. "Pan" (3:41)
- Wake
  - Released: 14 May 2002, Label: Essex Girl
1. "How Strong" (4:23)
2. "Bread and Water" (4:39)
3. "Faith" (4:12)
4. "Love Song" (4:23)
5. "Maze" (3:50)
6. "Ruby" (2:51)
7. "Moth and the Streetlight" (4:43)
8. "Seven Fat Englishmen" (3:59)
9. "Won't Get Lost in You" (3:32)
10. "Come To Me" (3:23)
11. "Breath" (4:20)
12. "Ownership" (hidden track)
- "Ode To Britney" (4:41)
  - Released: 8 May 2008
- Songs from the Bardo
  - Released: August 2009, Label: Essex Girl
1. "Where None are Afraid" (3:48)
2. "Pinking Up" (3:57)
3. "Bardo" (4:32)
4. "Old Friend" (3:18)
5. "Natural Law" (3:44)
6. "Pointless Tackles Vision" (5:03)
7. "Mighty Love" (3:26)
8. "Celery Bay" (4:19)
9. "City Between" (3:20)
10. "Bed" (3:44)
11. "Lay Low" (4:36)
12. "Simplify" (4:04)
