= Pictures from the Front =

Studio album by Jon Butcher
- Released: 1989
- Studio: The Pasha Music House
- Genre: Rock, pop
- Label: Capitol
- Producer: Glen Ballard, Jon Butcher, Spencer Proffer

Jon Butcher chronology
Wishes (1987)	Pictures from the Front (1989)	Positively the Blues (1995)

Pictures from the Front is an album by the American musician Jon Butcher, released in 1989. It was Butcher's second album fronting the Jon Butcher Group. He supported the album with a North American tour.

The album peaked at No. 121 on the Billboard 200. "Send Me Somebody" peaked at No. 7 on Billboard's Album Rock Tracks chart.

== Production ==
Produced by Glen Ballard, Butcher, and Spencer Proffer, the album was recorded in Los Angeles. "Come and Get It" is an instrumental track; "Beating Drum" is about apartheid in South Africa.

== Critical reception ==
Professional ratings
Review scores
Source	Rating
AllMusic	2/5 stars
MusicHound Rock: The Essential Album Guide	1.5/5 stars

The Los Angeles Times wrote that the album shows that "Butcher is capable of conveying honest emotion while turning out a reasonably palatable brand of arena rock." The St. Petersburg Times deemed it "tuneful, if rather bland, guitar-driven rock."

The Atlanta Journal-Constitution determined that the album "continues the music-with-a-message style of Wishes, with guitar-playing that ranges from gently melodic to blistering and lyrics that come from Mr. Butcher's life and his concerns." The Omaha World-Herald thought that "Butcher's biggest stumbling block—his throaty voice—too often crowds out his guitar playing this time out." The Advocate concluded that "Butcher's lyrics are a cut above most other rockers ... his problem is that his musical style falls into that middle ground between grinding hard rock and the pop metal which is now in vogue."

MusicHound Rock: The Essential Album Guide considered Pictures from the Front to be "a desperate-sounding grab bag."

== Track listing ==
No.	Title	Length
1.	"I'm Only Dreaming"
2.	"Might as Well Be Free"
3.	"Live or Die"
4.	"99 (May Be All You Need)"
5.	"Beating Drum"
6.	"The Mission"
7.	"Send Me Somebody"
8.	"Division Street"
9.	"Come and Get It"
10.	"Waiting for a Miracle"
