= Supposed Former Infatuation Junkie =

Studio album by Alanis Morissette
- Released: November 3, 1998
- Recorded: 1997–1998
- Studio: Royaltone (Los Angeles, California)
- Genres: Alternative rock; post-grunge; trip hop; chamber rock
- Length: 71:50
- Labels: Maverick; Reprise
- Producers: Glen Ballard; Alanis Morissette

Alanis Morissette chronology
The Singles Box (1997)	Supposed Former Infatuation Junkie (1998)	MTV Unplugged (1999)

Singles from Supposed Former Infatuation Junkie
- 1. "Thank U" Released: October 12, 1998; 2. "Joining You" Released: January 3, 1999; 3. "So Pure" Released: March 10, 1999; 4. "Unsent" Released: March 18, 1999

Supposed Former Infatuation Junkie is the fourth studio album and second internationally released album by Canadian singer-songwriter Alanis Morissette, released by Maverick Records in the United States on November 3, 1998. Inspired from her trip to India over late 1996 and early 1997, the album cover contains phrases from eight precepts, a basic code of ethics of the followers of Buddhism. Morissette later described writing this record after the massive success of her international debut, as her most important professional accomplishment.

Morissette experimented with more complex and unconventional songwriting, including stream of consciousness, often deviating from traditional verse-chorus structures. This approach resulted in a richer, more textured sound that incorporated new musical ideas leaning into trip hop and chamber rock while still maintaining her characteristic vocal style and introspective lyrics. She promoted the album with worldwide touring. The album gets its name from a lyric in the track "So Pure".

The album received critical praise, topping the U.S. Billboard 200 and breaking the record for first week album sales by a female artist at the time. It also topped the album charts in Canada, New Zealand, Germany and Norway. The album's lead single, "Thank U", reached the top 20 of the US Billboard Hot 100. It additionally won the 2000 Juno Award for Album of the Year and two Grammy nominations for "Thank U" and "So Pure".

== Background ==
After an exhausting 18-month worldwide tour in support of her major breakthrough album Jagged Little Pill, which was finished on December 14, 1996 in Hawaii, Morissette decided to retreat to India to recover and heal her post-traumatic stress disorder, which occurred to her during the tour. The trip inspired the concept of her next album.

The album explores themes of personal growth, self-reflection, and spiritual searching inspired by Morissette's experiences in India and her changing perspectives on relationships, self-worth, and acceptance. While there are songs about relationships and inner longing, the album deals with a wide range of emotional topics.

In this context, "junkie" is used metaphorically to suggest someone who was once compulsively attached (a "junkie" for infatuation) but is now supposedly past that phase. It does not refer to the object of love, but rather to the person experiencing the attachment or craving.

It reflects a journey toward balance, self-awareness, and moving beyond old patterns of obsessive or addictive attachment—not only in love, but more generally in life.

Morissette wrote "Thank U" and "Baba" after her trip to India in 1997. The protagonist of "Baba" goes on a spiritual pilgrimage to India where she encounters a guru who, like many spiritual teachers in India, is referred to as "Baba". The word "Baba" means "father" in the Hindi language. Morissette opened most of shows during the Junkie era with the song, and it was featured as an opener during her 2002 tours. It has been seldom played since then. "Baba" opened Morissette's performance on the television show MTV Unplugged in 1999, but it was excluded from the CD release Alanis Unplugged. Another live version of "Baba" was released on the No Boundaries: A Benefit for the Kosovar Refugees CD.

In a 2012 interview with fans, director Kevin Smith confirmed that "Front Row" was partially inspired by a phone conversation he and Morissette once had. They were mutually attracted to each other but never actually dated. His suggestion of naming the reasons they were not a couple became part of the lyrics.

== Promotion ==
As with her previous album, Morissette did an extensive amount of touring in support of the record. In the fall of 1998, she embarked on a club tour, titled Dhanyavad (धन्यवाद), which is the Hindi word for "thank you". The tour took place across North America, with select appearances in Europe, Asia and Australia. The North American leg of the tour included opening act Chris Whitley.

Guitarist Nick Lashley and bassist Chris Chaney remained for this album's touring from the previous years, although there were several new band members. The band now incorporated a keyboardist, Deron Johnson, and welcomed guitarist Joel Shearer (from the Jagged Little Pill recording sessions) and drummer Gary Novak. Morissette herself continued playing guitar (more than on previous tours), as well as her signature harmonica. She also started playing the flute live, during the song "That I Would Be Good".

In January 1999, the Junkie Tour kicked-off, lasting through July, then returned from October through December. Opening acts included Garbage and Liz Phair, among others. The worldwide tour had alternating setlists for every leg, but included the usual set openers and closers. The concert introduction music was a track from DJ Shadow, entitled "Building Steam with a Grain of Salt".

During the tour, Morissette wrote the song "Still" for the Kevin Smith film, Dogma. This song was performed live for the first time in July at Morissette's VH1 Storytellers special. After that special, she performed in front of thousands during the Woodstock '99 concert festival in New York. Unlike the previous tours, Morissette focused mainly on performing songs that had been released and did not perform any new songs, aside from a couple of B-sides during the second half of the year.

In May, Morissette and Tori Amos announced the "5 1/2 Week Tour" which filled the touring void in August and September before "The Junkie Tour" re-commenced. The tour would be a joint venture, as they both co-headlined the bills. Toward the end of the tour, Morissette recorded her MTV Unplugged concert special. During the final weeks of "The Junkie Tour", keyboardist Deron Johnson left the band and was replaced, and Gary Novak took a temporary leave and was replaced as well.

Morissette announced a summer 2000 mini-tour, called The One Tour, which saw her enlisting a different fan in each city as her own ‘local ambassador’, to guide her during the daytime and show her the best that the region has to offer (food, history, culture, music, language, and more). These local guides were selected after having won Z.com’s online contest. The One Tour kicked-off on July 7, 2000 with a rare performance in Beirut, Lebanon, before continuing on to Europe, stopping in countries and cities she had never (or rarely) performed in, namely Belgium, Croatia, France, Germany, Italy, Portugal and Switzerland. This was followed by shows in Tel Aviv and Caesarea, Israel, and a final stop on July 22nd in Istanbul.

On August 17, 2000, Morissette gave a special performance in Los Angeles at the Museum of Tolerance. Two months later, in October, she participated in a televised special from the Navajo Nation in Arizona. This was filmed as the premiere episode of a series on MSN and DirecTV, called Music in High Places; in addition to acoustic performances, Morissette learned about key moments in Navajo history, as well as Navajo cultural practices, traditions and music. She also explored the local wilderness and went into nature, studying, meditating and reflecting with elders and spiritual leaders. The video Live in the Navajo Nation was released on August 27, 2002.

The Navajo Nation special was Morissette's final date of the year, and her final promotion connected to Supposed Former Infatuation Junkie, before she started work on her follow-up record, Under Rug Swept.

In November 2023, Morissette also announced The Triple Moon Tour with 33 live dates in the United States for the summer 2024 with the Joan Jett and the Blackhearts as support act, commemorating 25th anniversary of the album. However, aside from the traditional "Thank U" number, she performed only "That I Would Be Good" and "Heart of the House" as full performance, the other few songs were performed as segues.

== Singles ==
The first single from Supposed Former Infatuation Junkie, "Thank U", was released to US radio in October 1998. It charted considerably high in initial airplay because of the anticipation for the album, but many critics and listeners who had pigeonholed Morissette as an angry woman were surprised by the song's calm and serene feel. Released in November, the album debuted at number one on the US Billboard 200 with the highest first-week sales for a female artist at the time, selling 469,054 copies in its first seven days. She held this record for two years, until being outsold in first week sales by Britney Spears' Oops!... I Did It Again which sold 1.3 million copies in 2000. It held the number-one spot for an additional week, before falling to eighth place in what is generally a busy shopping period because of the holiday season. Over the next few weeks sales for the album slowly declined, and then faltered drastically. After 28 weeks, the album had fallen off the Billboard 200, and as of September 2008 it had sold 2.6 million copies in the US, less than a fifth in sales of that of Jagged Little Pill.

Though not an official single release in the US, "Joining You" became a modest hit on the Modern Rock Tracks chart; it was released as the album's second single in the UK and Europe. "Unsent", the second US single, peaked outside the top 40 on the US Billboard Hot 100. The third single "So Pure" made the top 40 in the UK as well as certain airplay charts in the US, though not the Billboard Hot 100. None of the singles revived significant interest in the album.

== Unreleased songs ==
=== B-sides and unreleased songs ===
Many songs were performed live during the Jagged Little Pill tour (1995–1996) and at festivals between albums that did not appear on either album:

- Death of Cinderella debuted live on December 6, 1995, remained unreleased until the 2015 deluxe edition.
- King of Intimidation debuted live on January 12, 1996, was unreleased until the 2015 Jagged Little Pill deluxe edition.
- No Pressure Over Cappuccino debuted live on January 12, 1996, appeared on the 1999 live album Alanis Unplugged.
- Gorgeous and London (debuted June 8, 1997): A live version of "London" appeared as a B-side to "Joining You" and "Unsent"; the studio versions were released on the 2015 deluxe edition.
- Pray for Peace (also known as "She Gave Me a Wink"): Debuted October 18, 1997; never released.
- The Weekend Song (or I Don't Know): Debuted February 4, 1996; never released.
- After A Year Like This One: Debuted July 12, 1996; never released.

Several songs were written specifically for Supposed Former Infatuation Junkie:

- Pollyanna Flower: Released as a B-side to "Thank U".
- These Are The Thoughts: Appeared on the "Joining You" single and later on Alanis Unplugged.
- Can't Not: Originally intended as a B-side but included on the album instead. Debuted live on January 12, 1996.
- Princes Familiar: Never officially released; only available in live acoustic form on Alanis Unplugged and The Collection.

=== Demo versions ===
Demos of several songs have leaked online

1. Thank U – Additional verses and lyrics; more upbeat drum track.
2. Unsent – Lower quality; features two extra verses and different names.
3. That I Would Be Good – Includes throat-clearing at the start, a lyric change, and a longer flute solo.
4. Can't Not – 30-second clip.
5. Uninvited – Vocals and piano only; officially released on the "Thank U" single and Japanese/Australian releases.
6. These Are the Thoughts – Features backing vocals and lyric changes; officially released on the Jagged Little Pill deluxe edition.

== Critical reception ==
Professional ratings
Review scores
Source	Rating
AllMusic	4/5 stars
Entertainment Weekly	B+
Los Angeles Times	4/4 stars
NME	6/10
Rolling Stone	4/5 stars
Slant Magazine	4/5 stars
Spin	7/10
Uncut	4/5 stars
USA Today	3.5/4 stars
The Village Voice	A−

Supposed Former Infatuation Junkie was acclaimed by music critics.

Stephen Thomas Erlewine from AllMusic called it a "clear step forward" and concluded that "Morissette is a weird acquired taste, due to her idiosyncratic vocals and doggedly convoluted confessionals – but [the album] certainly confirms that she doesn't quite sound like anyone else, either."

The Village Voice's Robert Christgau commented that he felt "privileged to listen along with all the young women whose struggles Morissette blows up to such a scale."

Ken Tucker from Entertainment Weekly complimented Morissette's new style and wrote that "Morissette has used her year-plus recording hiatus and newfound star status wisely, in pursuit of a way to make a vulnerable, openhearted album in the face of intense commercial expectations."

Slant Magazine critic Sal Cinquemani complimented the production and Morissette's songwriting: "... this only adds to the album's grandeur and overwhelming sense of import. Influenced musically as much as she was spiritually by her global journeys, songs like 'The Couch' have an undeniable world-music flair ... not one moment of Junkie's 70-plus minutes is less than captivating."

Despite the B+ grade from Ken Tucker in 1998, fellow Entertainment Weekly music critic David Browne was much harsher, writing that the album "has been the decade's foremost clunker --was corporate grunge and victim-culture whining incarnate". It was also listed amongst "the worst albums ever" by Q magazine.

== Commercial performance ==
In the United States, Supposed Former Infatuation Junkie debuted at number one on the Billboard 200 with 469,000 copies sold in its first week. The album broke the record for sales in its first week by a female act, surpassing Lauryn Hill's The Miseducation of Lauryn Hill which opened with 423,000 copies. This was later surpassed in 2000 by Britney Spears with the release of her second album Oops!... I Did It Again selling 1.3 million copies in its first week. In the New Zealand Albums Chart, it was Morissette's second consecutive number one album, and was certificated 2× Platinum by RIANZ, selling over 30,000 copies. The album also debuted at number one in Switzerland, and stayed in the charts for thirty-one weeks. It was certified Platinum in that country. The album entered at number one in Norway, staying there for three weeks. It was certificated platinum there as well. It also peaked in the top ten in many countries, including the United Kingdom, Australia, France, Sweden, and other European countries. The album has sold 2,604,000 copies in the United States as of March 2012. The album sold 2.2 million copies worldwide on its first week of release and over 5.2 million copies worldwide within a month.

== Accolades ==
"Thank U" received a Grammy Award nomination for Best Female Pop Vocal Performance, and "So Pure" was nominated in the category of Best Female Rock Vocal Performance.

The album itself won a Juno Award for Album of the Year. The third single So Pure won the award for Best Video.

== Track listing ==
All lyrics are written by Alanis Morissette; all music is composed by Morissette and Glen Ballard, except where noted.

No.	Title	Length
1.	"Front Row"	4:13
2.	"Baba"	4:29
3.	"Thank U"	4:18
4.	"Are You Still Mad" (°)	4:04
5.	"Sympathetic Character" (°)	5:13
6.	"That I Would Be Good"	4:16
7.	"The Couch"	5:24
8.	"Can't Not"	4:35
9.	"UR"	3:31
10.	"I Was Hoping"	3:51
11.	"One"	4:40
12.	"Would Not Come"	4:05
13.	"Unsent"	4:10
14.	"So Pure"	2:50
15.	"Joining You"	4:24
16.	"Heart of the House" (°)	3:46
17.	"Your Congratulations" (°)	3:54
Total length:		71:50

Japanese and Australian bonus track
No.	Title	Length
18.	"Uninvited" (demo) (°)	3:02
Total length:		74:52

° lyrics and music written solely by Morissette

=== Thank U Edition reissue ===
In honour of its 25th anniversary, the album was re-issued and re-titled as the "Thank U Edition" on September 6, 2024 via Rhino Records on vinyl and featuring a new cover artwork. It was made available on streaming platforms on June 21, 2024. The reissue contains 5 bonus-tracks, which were previously released as B-sides and other forms:

Thank U Edition bonus tracks
No.	Title	Length
18.	"Pollyanna Flower"	4:06
19.	"These Are The Thoughts"	3:16
20.	"Death of Cinderella"	3:15
21.	"Uninvited" (demo)	3:02
22.	"Uninvited" (Freemasons Remix)	4:33
Total length:		90:02

== Personnel ==
- Alanis Morissette – flute, harmonica, piano, vocals, producer, photography
- Glen Ballard – synthesizer, guitar, piano, programming, producer, engineer, string arrangements
- Benmont Tench – organ, chamberlin
- David Campbell – string arrangements
- Scott Campbell – engineer
- Gary Novak – percussion, drums
- Joel Shearer – guitar
- Jolie Levine – production coordination
- Nick Lashley – guitar
- Chris Bellman – mastering
- Chris Fogel – programming, engineer, mixing
- Kevin Reagan – art direction, design
- Roger Sommers – engineer, second engineer
- Dash Mihok – photography, loop
- Regina Thomas – photography
- Chris Chaney – bass guitar
- Stefan G. Bucher – design
- Shad T. Scott – programming
- Heather Stanley – photography

== Charts ==
=== Weekly charts ===
Weekly chart performance for Supposed Former Infatuation Junkie
Chart (1998–99)	Peak position
Australian Albums (ARIA)	2
Austrian Albums (Ö3 Austria)	3
Belgian Albums (Ultratop Flanders)	5
Belgian Albums (Ultratop Wallonia)	15
Canadian Albums (Billboard)	2
Canada Top Albums/CDs (RPM)	1
Dutch Albums (Album Top 100)	2
European Top 100 Albums (Music & Media)	1
Finnish Albums (Suomen virallinen lista)	4
French Albums (SNEP)	5
German Albums (Offizielle Top 100)	1
Italian Albums (FIMI)	2
Japanese Albums (Oricon)	9
New Zealand Albums (RMNZ)	1
Norwegian Albums (VG-lista)	1
Scottish Albums (Official Charts)	5
Spanish Albums (AFYVE)	6
Swedish Albums (Sverigetopplistan)	2
Swiss Albums (Schweizer Hitparade)	1
UK Albums (Official Charts)	3
US Billboard 200	1

Chart (2024)	Peak position
Hungarian Physical Albums (MAHASZ)	18

=== Year-end charts ===
1998 year-end chart performance for Supposed Former Infatuation Junkie
Chart (1998)	Position
Australian Albums (ARIA)	18
Austrian Albums (Ö3 Austria)	48
Belgian Albums (Ultratop Flanders)	25
Belgian Albums (Ultratop Wallonia)	74
Canada Top Albums/CDs (RPM)	37
Dutch Albums (Album Top 100)	31
French Albums (SNEP)	57
German Albums (Offizielle Top 100)	46
New Zealand Albums (RMNZ)	28
Swiss Albums (Schweizer Hitparade)	32
UK Albums (OCC)	31
US Billboard 200	99

1999 year-end chart performance for Supposed Former Infatuation Junkie
Chart (1999)	Position
Austrian Albums (Ö3 Austria)	22
Belgian Albums (Ultratop Flanders)	91
Canada Top Albums/CDs (RPM)	61
Dutch Albums (Album Top 100)	41
German Albums (Offizielle Top 100)	15
New Zealand Albums (RMNZ)	48
Swiss Albums (Schweizer Hitparade)	37
US Billboard 200	46

== Certifications and sales ==
Certifications and sales for Supposed Former Infatuation Junkie
Region	Certification	Certified units/sales
Argentina (CAPIF)	Gold	30,000^{^}
Australia (ARIA)	2× Platinum	140,000^{^}
Austria (IFPI Austria)	Platinum	50,000^{*}
Belgium (BRMA)	Gold	25,000^{*}
Brazil (Pro-Música Brasil)	Gold	150,000
Canada (Music Canada)	4× Platinum	400,000^{^}
Chile	Gold	
Czech Republic	Gold	
Denmark (IFPI Danmark)	Platinum	50,000^{^}
Finland (Musiikkituottajat)	Gold	20,846
France (SNEP)	2× Gold	200,000^{*}
Germany (BVMI)	Platinum	500,000^{^}
Hong Kong (IFPI Hong Kong)	Platinum	20,000^{*}
Indonesia	Gold	
Ireland (IRMA)	3× Platinum	45,000^{^}
Italy (FIMI)	2× Platinum	200,000^{*}
Japan (RIAJ)	Platinum	200,000^{^}
Malaysia	Gold	
Mexico (AMPROFON)	Gold	100,000^{^}
Netherlands (NVPI)	Platinum	100,000^{^}
New Zealand (RMNZ)	2× Platinum	30,000^{^}
Norway (IFPI Norway)	Platinum	83,000
Philippines (PARI)	Gold	20,000^{*}
Portugal (AFP)	Platinum	40,000^{^}
Singapore (RIAS)	2× Platinum	30,000^{*}
Spain (Promusicae)	Platinum	100,000^{^}
Sweden (GLF)	Platinum	80,000^{^}
Switzerland (IFPI Switzerland)	Platinum	50,000^{^}
Taiwan (RIT)	Gold	25,000^{*}
Thailand	Gold	
United Kingdom (BPI)	Platinum	300,000^{^}
United States (RIAA)	3× Platinum	3,000,000^{^}
Summaries
Europe (IFPI)	2× Platinum	2,000,000^{*}
Worldwide	—	8,000,000
^{*} Sales figures based on certification alone.^{^} Shipments figures based on certification alone.
