= Titan A.E. =

2000 film by Don Bluth and Gary Goldman

- Theatrical release poster
- Directed by: Don Bluth; Gary Goldman
- Screenplay by: Ben Edlund; John August; Joss Whedon
- Story by: Hans Bauer; Randall McCormick
- Produced by: David Kirschner; Gary Goldman; Don Bluth
- Starring: Matt Damon; Bill Pullman; Drew Barrymore; Nathan Lane; John Leguizamo; Janeane Garofalo; Ron Perlman
- Edited by: Bob Bender; Fiona Trayler; Paul Martin Smith
- Music by: Graeme Revell
- Production companies: 20th Century Fox Animation; Fox Animation Studios
- Distributed by: 20th Century Fox
- Release date: June 16, 2000
- Running time: 95 minutes
- Country: United States
- Language: English
- Budget: $75–90 million
- Box office: $36.8 million

Titan A.E. is a 2000 American animated post-apocalyptic science fiction action film directed by Don Bluth and Gary Goldman, and starring Matt Damon, Bill Pullman, John Leguizamo, Nathan Lane, Janeane Garofalo, and Drew Barrymore. Its title refers to the spacecraft central to the plot with A.E. meaning "After Earth". The animation of the film combines traditional hand-drawn created animation with the extensive use of computer-generated imagery.

The film tells the story of a young man named Cale Tucker who receives a mission to save humanity and protect the giant spaceship Titan that can create a new planet, after a hostile alien species have destroyed the planet Earth. Along the way, he joins up with a ship's crew and their captain, who help him race against time and find the ship, before the aliens can destroy it.

Theatrically released on June 16, 2000, by 20th Century Fox in the United States as the third and final project produced by Fox Animation Studios, Titan A.E. received mixed reviews from critics, with praise for its visuals and animation but criticism for its characters and plot. The film was also a box office disappointment, grossing $36.8 million against a budget of $75–90 million. It has since become a cult classic.

== Plot ==
In 3028 A.D., a groundbreaking scientific project known as "The Titan Project" incurs the wrath of the Drej, a hostile race of aliens made of pure energy, who fear that it will allow humans to challenge them. Determined to wipe out humanity due to the potential of the project, the Drej (who the Drej Queen orders to kill all humans) initiate a massive attack on Earth, forcing the human race to evacuate the planet. During the evacuation, Professor Sam Tucker—head researcher on the Titan Project—leaves his young son Cale in the care of his Vusstran friend Tek and flees Earth in the spaceship Titan. Before he leaves, he gives Cale a gold ring, promising him that there will be hope for humanity as long as he wears it. The Drej destroy Earth, and the surviving humans flee into space.

15 years later, the remnants of humanity live on as refugees, but face extinction with no home planet of their own. Ex-military officer Joseph Korso, a former friend and confidant of the late Sam, tracks down a jaded and cynical Cale, who works in the salvage yard of space station Tau 14. Korso reveals that a holographic map leading to the location of the Titan is encoded in Cale's ring, and invites Cale to join the crew of his spaceship, the Valkyrie, as they seek the Titan. Accepting Korso's offer, Cale escapes the Tau 14 with him as the Drej pursue them and wanting Cale killed. On the Valkyrie, Cale befriends human pilot Akima Kunimoto, and 3 alien crew members: first mate Preedex "Preed" Yoa, surly weapons officer Stith, and eccentric astronomer Gune.

Cale's map leads the crew of the Valkyrie to the planet Sesharrim, where an alien race called the Gaoul help them interpret the map, revealing that the Titan is hidden in the Andali Nebula. Drej fighters then attack the planet and abduct Cale (who the Drej actually want alive) and Akima in order to copy the map and imprision Cale. Akima is rescued by the crew due to having been jettisoned by the Drej Queen, while Cale, after hearing the Drej Queen's new plan to kill the humans, escapes the Drej mothership in a stolen fighter and makes his way back to the Valkyrie. The map changes to reveal that the Titan is hidden in the Ice Rings of Tigrin, a labyrinthine ice field in space. While resupplying at human space station New Bangkok, Cale and Akima discover that Korso and Preed teamed up with the Drej (only to sell the Titan's location to them) and manage to escape the Valkyrie and are left stranded on New Bangkok when Korso leaves for the Titan. Determined to beat Korso to the Titan, they fix up a dilapidated spaceship with help from the station's inhabitants.

Cale and Akima navigate the ice rings of Tigrin in a race against the Valkyrie and dock with the Titan. They discover the DNA coding of various animals (which either are, or will be) onboard and a pre-recorded message left by a now-deceased Sam (who was killed by the Drej due to not facing the truth), explaining that the ship was designed to create planets. However, the ship's power cells were drained during the escape from Earth, and lack the energy necessary, making the ship no longer start a transformation and create a planet. The Valkyrie arrives, and Preed sets off a bomb in an attempt to kill Stith and Gune. Finding Cale and Akima, Preed betrays Korso and reveals his own deal he made with the Drej, just having arrived and located the Titan, only to prepare to destroy it. A fight ensues, and Korso kills Preed by snapping his neck. Cale and Korso fight, resulting in Korso falling over a railing.

As the Drej begin their attack on the Titan, Cale realizes that he may be able to recharge the Titan by using the Drej, as they are made of pure energy, but a circuit breaker stalls before he can complete the process. As Cale attempts to repair it, Akima, Stith and Gune fight off the Drej. Korso, who survived his fall, has a change of heart and sacrifices his life to repair the circuit breaker. Cale triggers the Titan's systems, which absorb the Drej and their mothership, killing them. The Titan creates a new world.

One year later, Cale and Akima embrace in the rain on the newly created planet (which Cale thinks he'll call "Bob") as ships filled with human colonists arrive to start a new life on the planet which is actually known as New Earth.

== Voice cast ==
- Matt Damon as Cale Tucker, a yard-salvager who carries the map to Titan on his hand.
  - Alex D. Linz as young Cale Tucker
- Bill Pullman as Captain Joseph Korso, former soldier and captain of the Valkyrie.
- Drew Barrymore as Akima Kunimoto, pilot of the Valkyrie and Cale's love interest.
- Nathan Lane as Preedex "Preed" Yoa, a fruit bat-like Akrennian and Korso's first mate.
- John Leguizamo as Gune, a frog-like Grepoan and Korso's chief scientist.
- Janeane Garofalo as Stith, a kangaroo-like Sogowan and munitions officer of the Valkyrie.
- Ron Perlman as Professor Sam Tucker, Cale's father who helped develop Project Titan.
- Tone Lōc as Tek, Sam Tucker's Vusstran friend who raises Cale after Sam left.
- Jim Breuer as the Cook, a cockroach-like alien who works in a cafeteria at Tau 14.
- Christopher Scarabosio as the Drej Queen, the ruler of the Drej who fears the potential threat of humans and intends to destroy them.
- Jim Cummings as Chowquin, Cale's alien overseer at the salvage yard of Tau 14.
- Charles Rocket as:
  - Firrikash, an alien salvage yard worker at Tau 14 who bullies Cale.
  - A Slave Trader Guard who surprises Preed with his intelligence.
- Ken Hudson Campbell (credited as Ken Campbell) as Po, an alien salvage yard worker at Tau 14 who bullies Cale.
- Tsai Chin as an old woman
- Crystal Scales as a drifter girl
- David Lander as the Mayor of New Bangkok
- Roger L. Jackson as the first alien who works as a salvage yard worker at Tau 14
- Thomas A. Chantler as Male Announcer
- Elaine A. Clarke as a citizen
- Roy Conrad as Second Human
- Leslie Hedger as First Human
- Shannon Orrock as the female announcer that states that the Drej Stingers are attacking the escape vehicles
- Alex Pels as a soldier
- Eric Schniewind as an alien
- Stephen Stanton as a colonist

== Production ==
=== Development ===
Titan A.E. was originally intended to be a live-action film tentatively titled Planet Ice, with Art Vitello hired to direct. By November 1997, the project had been revamped into an animated feature, with Matt Damon joining the voice cast, along with Bill Pullman, Drew Barrymore, Nathan Lane, Jim Breuer, Janeane Garofalo, Hank Azaria and Lena Olin. John Leguizamo joined the cast after Azaria and Olin dropped out due to scheduling conflicts. In an interview with Variety, Chris Meledandri, then-president of Fox Family Films, stated: "The imagery would be too costly to realize in live action. It will distinguish this film, which has a cast not only of humans but also aliens. And the group of actors we've put together is about the finest assembled for an animated film."

By September 1997, Ben Edlund had written the first screenplay draft. John August came aboard the project in February 1998, and was hired to polish the dialogue but remained on the project for further rewrites. The film's visual effects were handled by the Blue Sky/VIFX visual effects studio, and millions had been spent on previsualization tests of the space environments and spacecraft. In February 1998, Vitello departed the project. During the summer of 1998, Bill Mechanic, then-chairman of 20th Century Fox, handed the script to Fox Animation Studios creative heads Don Bluth and Gary Goldman, who had finished directing Bartok the Magnificent (1999). Mechanic had no in-development projects for Fox Animation Studios to work on and was faced with the choice of potentially laying off the animation staff unless they took another project.

Despite their inexperience with the science fiction genre, Bluth and Goldman took the script regardless. Bluth explained, "When we came to Fox, one of the things that we all talked about was that we shouldn't try to be a 'Disney wanna-be'. We wanted to make a picture that's edgier, still reaches the family and goes a little further and even brings in the teenagers." Joss Whedon, who had signed a multi-picture film and television deal with 20th Century Fox, was hired to finalize the script.

As directors, Bluth and Goldman were given a production budget of $55 million and 19 months to finish the film. Before their involvement, $30 million had been spent on pre-production. Unlike Bluth and Goldman's previous films, the animation in Titan A.E. is predominantly computer-generated while the main characters and several backgrounds were traditionally animated. Many of the scenes were enacted by the animation staff using handbuilt props before being captured by a computer.

Many scenes and backgrounds were painted by concept artist Paul Cheng, who had previously worked on Anastasia (1997) and its direct-to-video spin-off Bartok the Magnificent (1999). Much like Anastasia, the storytelling and tone in Titan A.E. is much darker and edgier than Bluth and Goldman's previous films with the film being regularly compared to Japanese anime. Although Bluth and Goldman denied any influence by anime, they have acknowledged the comparison.

During production, Fox Animation Studios suffered a number of cutbacks which ultimately led to its closure in 2000. Over 300 animation staff were laid off from the studio in 1999 and as a result, much of the film's animation was outsourced to several independent studios. Several scenes were contracted to David Paul Dozoretz's POVDE group; the "Wake Angels" scene was animated by Reality Check Studios (their first feature film work) while the film's "Genesis" scene was animated by Blue Sky Studios, who would later go on to produce 20th Century Fox's Ice Age and Rio film franchises as well as Horton Hears a Who! (2008) and The Peanuts Movie (2015) and the CGI Animals in The Greatest Showman (2017). Under pressure from executives, Bill Mechanic was dismissed from 20th Century Fox prior to Titan A.E.'s release eventuating in the closure of Fox Animation Studios on June 26, 2000, ten days after the film's release. All these events stunted the film's promotion and distribution.

== Music ==
=== Soundtrack ===
Titan A.E.: Music from the Motion Picture

Soundtrack album by various artists
- Released: June 6, 2000
- Genres: Post-grunge; pop-punk; nu metal; alternative rock; pop rock; rap
- Length: 44:30
- Labels: Capitol; EMI

Professional ratings
Review scores
Source	Rating
AllMusic	2.5/5 stars

The soundtrack to Titan A.E. was released on audio cassette and CD by Capitol/EMI Records on June 6, 2000, and featured 11 tracks by contemporary rock bands Lit, Powerman 5000, Electrasy, Fun Lovin' Criminals, The Urge, Texas, Bliss 66, Jamiroquai, Splashdown, The Wailing Souls and Luscious Jackson.

No.	Title	Artist	Length
1.	"Over My Head"	Lit	3:39
2.	"The End Is Over"	Powerman 5000	3:10
3.	"Cosmic Castaway"	Electrasy	3:30
4.	"Everything Under the Stars"	Fun Lovin' Criminals	4:04
5.	"It's My Turn to Fly"	The Urge	3:44
6.	"Like Lovers (Holding On)"	Texas	4:36
7.	"Not Quite Paradise"	Bliss 66	3:59
8.	"Everybody's Going to the Moon"	Jamiroquai	5:24
9.	"Karma Slave"	Splashdown	3:26
10.	"Renegade Survivor"	The Wailing Souls	4:07
11.	"Down to Earth"	Luscious Jackson	4:51

Creed's song "Higher" was played in many of the theatrical trailers for Titan A.E., but the song did not appear either on the soundtrack or in the film itself.

=== Score ===
Titan A.E.: Limited Edition

Film score by Graeme Revell
- Released: October 23, 2014
- Genre: Film score
- Length: 76:55
- Label: La-La Land Records
- Producer: Graeme Revell

Don Bluth Music of Films chronology
Anastasia (1997)	Titan A.E. (2000)

Titan A.E.'s score was composed and conducted by Graeme Revell. Although an official album containing the film's underscore was not originally released alongside the film, it was eventually made available for the first time on October 23, 2014, by La-La Land Records as a limited edition CD of 1,500 copies. The soundtrack contains 32 tracks and music cues, most of what Revell composed for the film, and includes two bonus tracks: an orchestra-only version of "Creation" and an alternative version of "Prologue" with a different opening.

== Release ==
=== Digital screening ===
Titan A.E. became the first major motion picture to be screened in end-to-end digital cinema. On June 6, 2000 (ten days before the film was released) at the SuperComm 2000 trade show, the film was projected simultaneously at the trade show in Atlanta, Georgia as well as a screen in Los Angeles, California. It was sent to both screens from the 20th Century Fox production facilities in Los Angeles via a VPN.

=== Home media ===
Titan A.E. was released on VHS and a THX certified "Special Edition" DVD on November 7, 2000 by 20th Century Fox Home Entertainment, which contains extras such as a commentary track by Don Bluth and Gary Goldman, a "Quest for Titan" featurette, deleted scenes, web links, and a music video for Lit's "Over My Head". The region 1 North American version also comes with an exclusive DTS English audio track in addition to Dolby Digital 5.1 featured in most international releases. During its first week on the US DVD sales chart, it ranked second behind Mission: Impossible 2. Chris Carle of IGN rated the DVD an 8 out of 10, calling the film "thrilling... with some obvious plot and character flaws" but called the video itself "a fully-packed disc which looks and sounds great" and "for animation and sci-fi fans, it's a must-have".

== Reception ==
=== Box office ===
Titan A.E. earned nearly $9.4 million during its opening weekend, ranking in fifth place behind Shaft, Gone in 60 Seconds, 20th Century Fox's own Big Momma's House and Mission: Impossible 2. The film then lost 60 percent of its audience during its second weekend, dropping to eighth place, with a gross of $3.7 million. The film grossed nearly $22.8 million in the United States and Canada, and $14 million in international markets, totaling $36.8 million worldwide. The film's budget is estimated between $75 and $90 million. According to former Fox executive and future Illumination founder Chris Meledandri, who had supervised production of the film, Titan A.E. lost $100 million for the studio.

=== Critical response ===
On Rotten Tomatoes, the film has an approval rating of 51% based on 102 reviews with an average rating of 5.70/10. The site's consensus reads: "Great visuals, but the story feels like a cut-and-paste job of other sci-fi movies". On Metacritic, the film has a score of 48 out of 100 based on 30 reviews, indicating "mixed or average reviews". Audiences polled by CinemaScore gave the film an average grade of "A−" on an A+ to F scale. Roger Ebert gave the film 3 1/2 stars out of 4, praising it for its "rousing story", "largeness of spirit" and "lush galactic visuals [which] are beautiful in the same way photos by the Hubble Space Telescope are beautiful". He cited the Ice Rings sequence as "a perfect example of what animation can do and live-action cannot". Bob Graham of the San Francisco Chronicle wrote: "Titan A.E. comes through where it counts, in the big picture. It will fascinate anyone old enough to read comic books, and, with its dark undercurrents, sudden reversals and confrontation of an uncertain future, teens probably can identify with it." Robert Koehler of Variety praised the animation and felt the film was an improvement over Bluth and Goldman's previous film Anastasia, resulting in a "canny attraction for genre purists, hard-core ani-heads and the mass aud for galactic adventure."

Reviewing for the Chicago Tribune, Michael Wilmington stated "Despite its highly derivative story, this animated saga from the Don Bluth-Gary Goldman team is done with such visual razzle-dazzle, there's no denying it's some kind of a technological marvel: a modern lollapalooza concocted out of old-fashioned space opera elements." Richard Corliss, in his Time magazine review, felt the film has "the retro-pioneering spirit of recent [science fiction] movies" and praised the animation visuals. Kenneth Turan of the Los Angeles Times wrote the film's "rudimentary narration does work up a certain amount of propulsion. But it's not the story that's the story here, it's the film's bravura visual look. Under the joint direction of animation veterans Don Bluth and Gary Goldman and influenced, connoisseurs say, by the style of Japanese anime, Titan A.E. does an excellent job of using computer-generated effects to create a vast and wondrous outer-space world."

Stephen Holden of The New York Times gave the film a mixed review, stating: "Despite some gorgeous sequences, including one set in a lake of glowing hydrogen 'trees,' Titan A.E. is bland. Although crammed with action, little of it produces roller-coaster thrills of adventure and self-discovery." Similarly, Owen Gleiberman of Entertainment Weekly graded the film a C, writing the story and visuals were "unutterably bland ... Bluth had the right idea with those epic ice crystals, but it takes more than one F/X flash to create a universe. Titan A.E. is Star Wars pulped and mashed into flavorless kiddie corn." Dennis Lim, in his review for The Village Voice, dismissed the film, writing it is "suggestive of nothing so much as Saturday-morning TV: 2-D characters frolic in 3-D CGI spacescapes, but the handiwork is uninspired, the digi-chicanery obviously expensive but bland, the New Age odor off-putting, and the reliance on inspirational Glen Ballard power ballads fatal."

=== Accolades ===
Titan A.E. won a Golden Reel Award for "Best Sound Editing for an Animated Feature", and was nominated by the same organization for "Best Sound Editing for Music in Animation", and a Satellite Award for "Best Motion Picture, Animated or Mixed Media", losing both to Chicken Run. The film was also nominated for three Annie Awards, including "Outstanding Achievement in An Animated Theatrical Feature", "Effects Animation", and "Production Design" which it lost to Toy Story 2 and Fantasia 2000, respectively, and was nominated for Best Science Fiction Film at 27th Saturn Awards, but lost to X-Men, another film from 20th Century Fox. Drew Barrymore was nominated for "Best Voice-Over Performance" by the Online Film & Television Association for her role as Akima, but was beaten by Eartha Kitt from The Emperor's New Groove.

Award	Nomination	Nominee	Result
Annie Award	Outstanding Individual Achievement for Effects Animation	Julian Hynes (visual effects)	Nominated
Annie Award	Outstanding Individual Achievement for Production Design in an Animated Feature Production	Philip A. Cruden (production design)	Nominated
Annie Award	Outstanding Achievement in An Animated Theatrical Feature	Titan A.E.	Nominated
Golden Reel Award	Best Sound Editing - Animated Feature	Christopher Boyes, et al. (editors)	Won
Golden Reel Award	Best Sound Editing - Music - Animation	Joshua Winget (scoring/music editor)	Nominated
OFTA Film Award	Best Voice-Over Performance	Drew Barrymore (Akima)	Nominated
Satellite Award	Best Motion Picture, Animated or Mixed Media	Titan A.E.	Nominated
Saturn Award	Best Science Fiction Film	Titan A.E.	Nominated

== Novels ==
To tie-in with the film, two prequel novels written by Kevin J. Anderson and Rebecca Moesta were released on February 10, 2000, by Ace Books, the same day the official novelization of the film written by Steve and Dal Perry was released:

- Titan A.E.: Cale's Story – the adventures of Cale, ending with the beginning of the film. The book chronicles Cale growing up on Vusstra (Tek's home planet) for ten years and having to move to a different place every time the Drej attack. It also reveals how Cale became resentful of his father's disappearance and how he came to despise "drifter colonies".
- Titan A.E.: Akima's Story – the adventures of Akima, ending with the beginning of the film. The book chronicles Akima's life aboard drifter colonies and also reveals where she learned her karate skills, her friendship with Stith and her reason to find the Titan.

A Dark Horse Comics comic series focusing on the character Sam was also released in May 2000:

- Titan A.E.: Sam's Story – a three-issue comic book series telling the story of Sam Tucker, his crew and their quest to hide the Titan.

== See also ==
- List of films featuring space stations
- List of 20th Century Fox theatrical animated features
- List of American films of 2000
