= Bliss 66 =

- Origin: Taylor, Michigan
- Genres: Alternative rock, pop rock
- Years active: 1997–2003; 2013 (reunion)
- Labels: Epic Records, Java/Capitol Records

Bliss 66 was a six-member American rock band from Taylor, Michigan.

== History ==
Bliss 66, originally called Utopia, then Novicain, was formed by guitarists Aaron Schossau and Rob Harbin in Taylor, Mi, a suburb of Detroit, in 1997. The band was later renamed to Bliss and was forced to add the 66 when signing with Capitol Records. He met some of the other members of the group at a church camp. Their first record was a self-released 11-track demo, recorded at Tempermill. They first found local exposure on Detroit radio station 105.1, who played their single "Do It Again". In the summer of 2000, the group signed to Capitol Records. Soon after, their song "Not Quite Paradise" was used in the film Titan A.E.. Glen Ballard, who oversaw the soundtrack to Titan A.E., produced the band's debut album, Trip to the 13th, which was released in June 2001 after the band switched labels, signing with Epic Records. Schossau wrote most of the tracks on the album. Following the release of the album, the group toured with Fuel, Evan and Jaron, Athenaeum, Mayfield Four, and Default. They also toured with Smash Mouth, Shaggy, Vertical Horizon, and Seven Mary Three.

The album received critical acclaim, but was unable to chart a national hit, and the group was dropped from the label. Trip to the 13th was nominated for Outstanding National Album at the Detroit Music Awards in 2002. In 2002, after replacing Aaron with guitarist Derek Dorey, the band self-pressed their last release, the ten-track Life Is a Comedown, and sold it at shows.

The group split up in 2003. Lead vocalist Cheyenne Goff went on to form the group Paper Street Saints which also featured Bliss 66 bassist Don Patty, and Charlie Grover from Sponge on drums. The band won a Detroit Music Award in 2007 for their full length lp entitled "Pride and Punishment", and still play periodical shows on a regional level. Goff and Patty also began recording and performing with a group called Half Light Music in '09.

Aaron Schossau went off to start a new project titled "Stolen" with local musician Chad Dickinson, however, the group disbanded shortly after their development. Schossau was playing drums and writing material for a Downriver Michigan pop rock band titled "The Koy," but later abandoned the project to pursue other goals.

Jordan Barnett started a band called the Supernovas and went on to record the "pearl sessions", a short demo of the bands "rockier" songs. The band fell apart after disagreements and feuds between the five members. Barnett began writing material for a project called "The North".

== Members ==
- Cheyenne Goff - vocals
- Aaron Schossau - guitar
- Jordan Barnett - keyboards, vocals
- Bob Cook - drums, shakers
- Rob Harbin - guitar, vocals
- Don Patty - bass
- Derek Dorey - guitar

== Discography ==
Studio albums

- In Bliss (Demo, 1998)
- Trip to the 13th (Sony/Epic, June 26, 2001)
- Life Is a Comedown (Self-released, November 29, 2002)
