= That I Would Be Good =

1999 single by Alanis Morissette

Single by Alanis Morissette

from the album MTV Unplugged
- B-side: "Would Not Come (Reverb Live)"; "Forgiven (Reverb Live)"; "I Was Hoping (99X Live)"
- Released: 1999
- Recorded: Mid-1998 (album version); September 18, 1999 (live version)
- Studio: Royaltone (Los Angeles; album version)
- Length: 4:07
- Label: Maverick
- Songwriters: Alanis Morissette; Glen Ballard
- Producer: Alanis Morissette

Alanis Morissette singles chronology
"Unsent" (1999)	"That I Would Be Good" (1999)	"You Learn (MTV Unplugged)" (1999)

"That I Would Be Good" is a song by Canadian singer-songwriter Alanis Morissette that was first included on her fourth studio album, Supposed Former Infatuation Junkie (1998). An acoustic live version of the song was recorded during a session for MTV Unplugged on September 18, 1999. The live version was released as a single in Europe in 1999 and in Canada on February 8, 2000.

The lyrics relate Morissette's intimate feelings about being judged, expressing insecurity and self-doubt, in theme and variation, and the desire to be sufficient in the face of changing external circumstances. The song received mostly positive reviews from music critics, who praised the flute solo by Morissette and its sweetness. Commercially, the single charted on the US Billboard Adult Top 40 and the Netherlands' Single Top 100.

== Background and writing ==
"That I Would Be Good" was one of the songs included on Alanis Morissette's fourth studio album, Supposed Former Infatuation Junkie (1998). Eventually, the album spawned four singles, with "Thank U" being the most successful single. Later, Alanis wrote the song "Still" for the soundtrack album of the 1999 film, Dogma. On September 18, 1999, Alanis recorded an MTV Unplugged special, singing songs from her previous albums, Jagged Little Pill (1995) and Supposed Former Infatuation Junkie (1998), as well as previously unreleased tracks.

The constant electrical buzz that can be heard throughout the track came unintentionally from Ballard recording too close to an amplifier. He re-recorded the guitar section to correct it, but Morissette immediately noticed the change - "What happened to the original?" - Ballard told her the buzz was bothering him, but she said, "No way. We've lost the magic, and you've gotta put it back."

"That I Would Be Good" was chosen to be the lead single of the album, being released in December 1999. The CD single features the MTV Unplugged version of "That I Would Be Good" and live versions of "Would Not Come", "I Was Hoping" (from Supposed Former Infatuation Junkie) and "Forgiven" (from Jagged Little Pill).

== Composition ==
"That I Would Be Good" was written by Morissette and Glen Ballard; both wrote Morissette's biggest hits, "You Oughta Know", "Ironic", "You Learn", "Head over Feet", and "Thank U". Produced by Morissette herself, the song is a "muted" and "crawling" ballad, with a flute solo coda, where Alanis plays her own flute. Written in the key of A major, it has a moderate tempo of 84 beats per minute, while Morissette's vocals span from the low-note of B3 to the high-note of A6.

Lyrically, "That I Would Be Good" claims a self-confidence independent of fluctuations in emotional state or physical appearance. It is filled with wonder over whether one still feels whole in the face of any number of life's ills: losing youth, bankruptcy, insanity, the absence of a chosen lover. According to Morissette on VH1 Storytellers and the documentary Sensitive the Untold Story (2015), the song was written during a time when there were many people in her house and she retreated to her closet to write the lyrics. She also confirmed that she wrote the lyrics and then the music at different times.

== Critical reception ==
The song's studio version received positive reviews from most music critics. Rob Sheffield of Rolling Stone was positive, calling it "the boldest, sweetest statement" on the album, realizing that while playing the flute, "she works her ass off to get it right, but she wins you over with her sheer daring; it isn't every day that a megastar comes right out and auditions for you." Chuck Taylor of Billboard noted that the track is "intense and meaningful", praising the addition of the flute, writing that "it's unique and appealing". Taylor also saw it as "a beautiful song" and "it could turn out to be a solid return hit." Sal Cinquemani of Slant Magazine wrote that the song "ends with a painful yet endearing flute solo by Morissette."

The unplugged version also gathered favorable reaction. Stephen Thomas Erlewine of AllMusic saw that Alanis chose to perform tracks from her latest album Supposed Former Infatuation Junkie on the Unplugged album "as a way to reintroduce it to an audience that largely ignored it the first time around," describing the tracks, including "That I Would Be Good" as "extremely personal songs, which benefit from the stripped-down arrangements and intimate surroundings." Neva Chonin of Rolling Stone commented that during some parts of the acoustic set, Alanis "overpowers her band", sometimes she kills them with neglect - 'Ironic' and 'That I Would Be Good,' for instance, have been whittled down to bare acoustic essentials."

== Commercial performance ==
"That I Would Be Good" was a minor hit on Billboard's Adult Top 40 Tracks chart, peaking at number 24. It also charted on the Netherlands's Single Top 100 chart, debuting at number 75 on November 20, 1999, while peaking at number 55 the following week. It remained at the peak position for a further week, while charting for ten weeks in the chart.

== Covers and pop culture ==
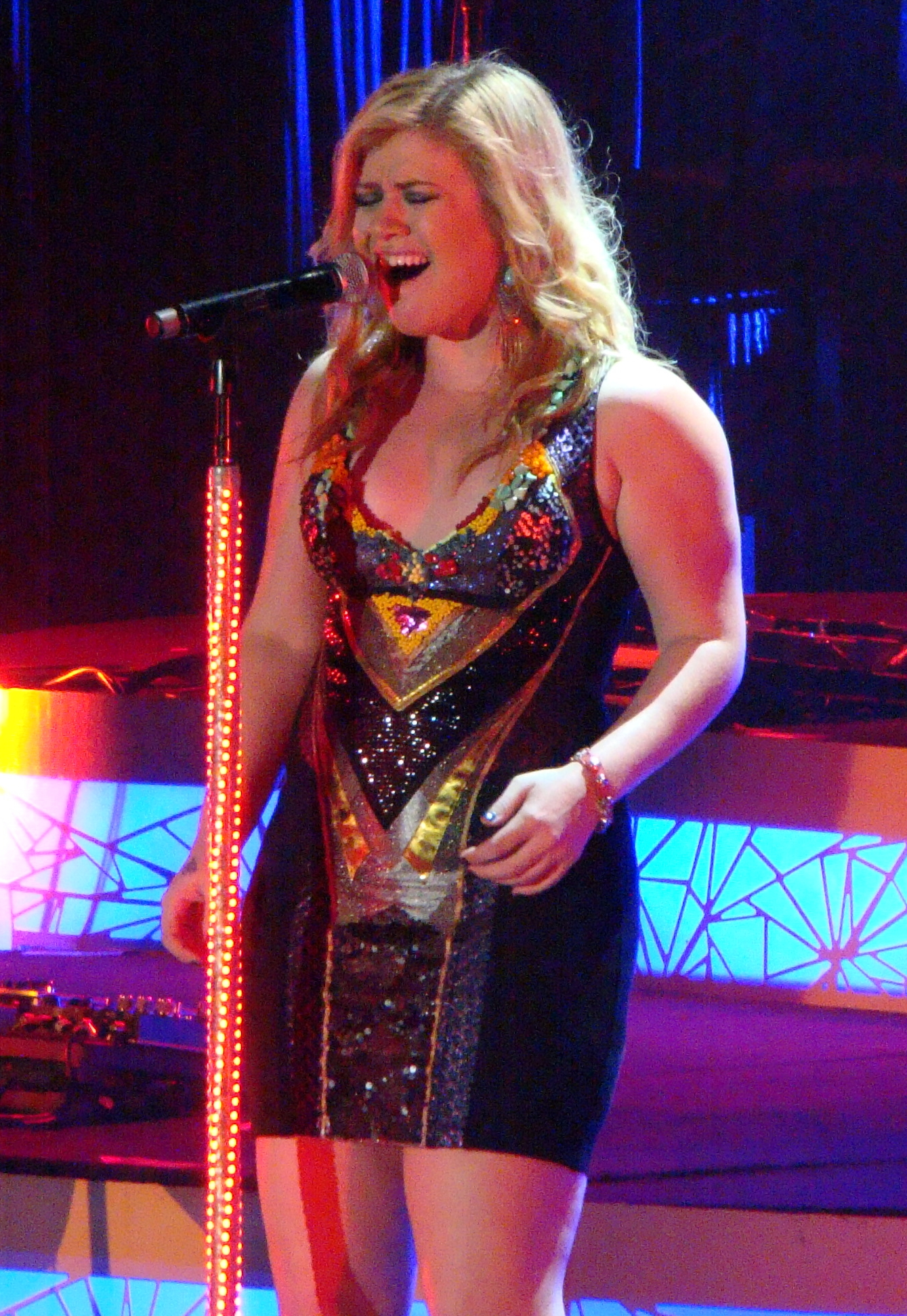
Kelly Clarkson covered the track on her tour.

Kelly Clarkson covered "That I Would Be Good" during her "All I Ever Wanted Tour", being mashed up with Kings of Leon's "Use Somebody". It was later recorded and included on her third EP The Smoakstack Sessions Vol. 2 released along with her Greatest Hits: Chapter One album. For Jessica Sager of Pop Crush, "it's an unexpected combination, but thematically and sonically, they work together perfectly," also praising Clarkson's vocals on "That I Would Be Good", writing that, "Clarkson replaces the Canadian crooner’s warbling with her own soulful pipes." Alex Nagorsi of MuuMuse wrote that, "Clarkson’s soaring vocal range takes center stage to deliver a powerhouse performance."

The song was used in the episode of Dawson's Creek which aired on May 19, 1999.

== Track listing ==
1. "That I Would Be Good" (MTV Unplugged) – 4:07
2. "Would Not Come" (Reverb live) – 4:11
3. "Forgiven" (Reverb live) – 5:11
4. "I Was Hoping" (99X live) – 4:37

== Charts ==
Chart (1999–2000)	Peak position
Australia (ARIA)	139
Canada Top Singles (RPM)	28
Canada Adult Contemporary (RPM)	48
Netherlands (Dutch Top 40 Tipparade)	3
Netherlands (Single Top 100)	55
US Adult Pop Airplay (Billboard)	24

== Release history ==
Region	Date	Format(s)	Label(s)	Ref.
Europe	1999	CD	Maverick	
Japan	January 19, 2000	CD	Maverick	
Canada	February 8, 2000	CD	Maverick	
