= Unsent =

1999 single by Alanis Morissette

Single by Alanis Morissette

from the album Supposed Former Infatuation Junkie
- Released: March 18, 1999
- Recorded: Mid-1998
- Studio: Royaltone (Los Angeles)
- Length: 4:08
- Label: Maverick; Reprise
- Composers: Alanis Morissette; Glen Ballard
- Lyricist: Alanis Morissette
- Producers: Alanis Morissette; Glen Ballard; Nick Rasculinecz

Alanis Morissette singles chronology
"So Pure" (1999)	"Unsent" (1999)	"That I Would Be Good" (1999)

Music video
- "Unsent" on YouTube

"Unsent" is a song by Canadian singer-songwriter Alanis Morissette from her fourth studio album, Supposed Former Infatuation Junkie (1998). The lyrics were written by Morissette, who also composed the music with Glen Ballard. It was released as the album's third single on March 18, 1999. It was one of the few Junkie tracks on which she played her harmonica. Morissette directed the music video for the song. Without a chorus or hook, "Unsent" has an unconventional song structure. The lyrics consist of letters addressed to Morissette's former boyfriends and friends. The single became a moderate hit, reaching number nine in Canada, number 28 in New Zealand, and number 58 in the United States.

== Background ==
While introducing the song on VH1's Storytellers special in 1999, Alanis Morissette said:

This is a song called "Unsent". And I wrote this song last summer, started off by writing the first verse and.... once I wrote about this one particular person in a letter that I had not had the courage to send to them, I realized that there were about fifty people that I could write about but I wasn't sure that I wanted to write a song that was going to be an hour long so... I got the top five or six people that I really wanted to have closure with and I think it's... it was one of the most... closure-inducing songs to say the least, and some of them I actually finished the record and couldn't sleep for a long time because well there were several things on the record that made it so that I couldn't really sleep very well knowing that I was about to share it with a bunch of people. But this song in particular... I felt like I needed to call a few people before I actually released this song, so I did. And the song itself actually forced me to deal directly with these people because it's so easy to write a song about something... In the past something would happen to me and I would run somewhere and write about it, and not necessarily talk directly to the person. It was very convenient and it resulted in a lot of release but not necessarily in a lot of closure so, this song I thought I was gonna get away with that once again, and because I couldn't sleep I knew that I was, my plans were foiled. So I had to actually call these people and they were all very very sweet about it, they appreciated the fact that I called them. And now when I sing it I know that I can sing it with permission and blessing, really.

A demo version of the song included lyrics about Morissette's former touring drummer, Taylor Hawkins.

== Critical reception ==
Chuck Taylor of Billboard wrote positively of "Unsent", naming it the most affecting single out of all the Supposed Former Infatuation Junkie singles. He called Morissette's vocals "lovely" and that it would bring the singer back to "a dominant place on the playlists of modern rock, adult, and mainstream top 40."

== Music video ==
Morissette herself directed the song's music video. Its format reminds of a movie, with subtitles portraying everything that the characters are saying. It opens with "Matthew" playing the guitar to Morissette, who feels she's bothering him and says she should leave. He says she should, but in a kind way. Alanis looks happy, but uncomfortable and leaves. The second act shows Morissette, with curly hair, sitting with "Jonathan" at a bar, asking if she could come to wherever he is going the next day. She's concerned girls are coming on the trip too. He says she can, but doesn't look too interested.

The third act shows Alanis and "Terrance" (played by Josh Hopkins) by the lake, having a conversation about whether he is coming to visit her, to which he jokingly responds that he's "too busy". They laugh and look happy. "Marcus" is the fourth to be shown. They kiss on a sofa, and he says he is very proud of Alanis. "What for?" she replies, and he says "[to be] open to testing different waters at the same time". Morissette looks confused, awkward, and sad. The last scene shows Morissette entering a car driven by "Lou". They say "hi" to one another, but the only other dialogue is when Lou says "What are you thinking?" at the very end of the video.

A 10-minute movie of the video is available with no music and no subtitles, but the actors speak this time. It shows extended footage of all five stories.

== Usage in media ==
In the American television show Cougar Town, Season 4 Episode 10 'You Tell Me', the video is referenced due to character Grayson Ellis', (played by Josh Hopkins), appearance as Terrance, which he wants to keep a secret. The secret gets out and another character Andy Torres, (played by Ian Gomez), shares his secret that he appeared in the Alanis Morissette Video 'Hands Clean' as the Music Executive.

== Track listing ==
Canadian and Australian CD single

1. "Unsent" (album version) – 4:08
2. "Are You Still Mad" (BBC/Radio One live) – 3:59
3. "London" (Bridge School Benefit live) – 4:46

== Charts ==
=== Weekly charts ===
Chart (1999)	Peak position
Australia (ARIA)	85
Canada Top Singles (RPM)	8
Canada Adult Contemporary (RPM)	11
New Zealand (Recorded Music NZ)	28
US Billboard Hot 100	58
US Adult Pop Airplay (Billboard)	14
US Pop Airplay (Billboard)	21
US Adult Alternative (Radio & Records)	29
US CHR/Pop (Radio & Records)	16
US Hot AC (Radio & Records)	12
US Pop/Alternative (Radio & Records)	14

=== Year-end charts ===
Chart (1999)	Position
Canada Top Singles (RPM)	42
Canada Adult Contemporary (RPM)	61
US Adult Top 40 (Billboard)	58
US Hot AC (Radio & Records)	62
