= Thank U =

1998 single by Alanis Morissette

Single by Alanis Morissette

from the album Supposed Former Infatuation Junkie
- B-side: "Pollyanna Flower"; "Uninvited" (demo)
- Written: 1997
- Released: October 12, 1998
- Studio: Royaltone (Los Angeles)
- Length: 4:19
- Label: Maverick; Reprise
- Songwriters: Alanis Morissette; Glen Ballard
- Producers: Alanis Morissette; Glen Ballard

Alanis Morissette singles chronology
"Uninvited" (1998)	"Thank U" (1998)	"Joining You" (1999)

Audio sample
- file; help

Music video
- "Thank U" on YouTube

"Thank U" (titled "Thank You" on her 2005 greatest hits compilation The Collection) is a song by Canadian-American singer Alanis Morissette from her fourth studio album, Supposed Former Infatuation Junkie (1998). She wrote and produced it with Glen Ballard after coming back from a trip to India. Maverick and Reprise Records released the song as a single on October 12, 1998.

"Thank U" received generally positive reviews from music critics and performed well on the record charts, reaching number one in Canada as well as the top 10 in eight other countries. An accompanying music video was released for the single, featuring Morissette nude in the streets. The song was nominated for Best Female Pop Vocal Performance at the 2000 Grammy Awards.

== Background ==
Alanis Morissette wrote "Thank U" during a trip to India in 1997. In 1998, Morissette contributed the song "Uninvited" to the soundtrack of the 1998 film City of Angels. In September of the same year, "Thank U" was released on radio and Alanis talked with MTV about the break between LPs and the first single: "Basically, I had never stopped in my whole life, hadn't taken a long breath, and I took a year and a half off and basically learned how to do that. When I did stop and I was silent and I breathed... I was just left with an immense amount of gratitude, and inspiration, and love, and bliss, and that's where the song came from, you know."

== Composition and writing ==
"Thank U" was written and produced by Alanis Morissette and Glen Ballard. "Thank U" is a rock song composed in the key of C Major. It is written in common time and moves at a moderate tempo of 91 beats per minute. The song uses a simple chord progression alternating between a tonic C major chord, dominant G major chord, and the subdominant F major chord. The music is simple, mid-tempo rock, with the drum track being a loop of the oft-sampled break in Sly and the Family Stone's "Sing a Simple Song". An electric piano intro underscores Morissette's vocals, which begin by asking, "How bout getting off these antibiotics?" The rest of the song continues with Morissette posing similar questions -- "How bout remembering your divinity?"—and her thanking the circumstances—terror, disillusionment, and consequence, among others—that helped her achieve personal growth.

The lyrics document Morissette's spiritual awakenings following her trip to India, as well as other physical and internal journeys. In "Thank U", Alanis expresses the heartfelt gratitude, inspiration, and compassion that she felt at the time she wrote it. According to Jon Pareles of The New York Times, the song has "verses of self-help," such as, "How 'bout no longer being masochistic?, how 'bout remembering your divinity?, how 'bout unabashedly bawling your eyes out?." Liana Jones of Allmusic noticed that "There aren't many artists, let alone everyday people, who acknowledge and pay tribute to life's lessons."

== Critical reception ==
Stephen Thomas Erlewine of AllMusic picked the song as a highlight from the album, writing that "the textured production functions as a backdrop for Morissette's cryptically introspective lyrics." Liana Jones also of AllMusic wrote that the song's lyrics are "a real boon for contemporary rock music, which tends to be simplistic and hackneyed in its themes." Larry Flick of Billboard praised the singer's performance, acknowledging her "zen-like confidence", calling it "an instantly memorable single that will saturate radio airwaves at all possible formats within a split-second." Daily Record noted that Morissette "returns to angst-ridden form". Ken Tucker of Entertainment Weekly wrote that the song's structure "creates an immediate catchiness, underpinned and emphasized by Gary Novak's hypnotic drum pattern." Tucker also called 'Thank U,' "a terrific single, with its positive sentiments tucked inside a crystalline melody like a message in a bottle." NME praised the "pleasant, lilting Liz Cocteau-on-a-broomstick style frame." Rob Sheffield of Rolling Stone wrote that the song "could've been a pretentious disaster, but instead it's a pretentious stroke of brilliance – she finds something shockingly smart to say about her spiritual crises, riding an indelible Eighties AOR synth hook and wailing like Robert Plant stealing 'Kashmir' back from Jimmy Page and 'Puffy'. Sal Cinquemani of Slant Magazine called the "soft-rock synth hook" and "the bundle of Morissette's signature list-y lyrics," "anything but ordinary."

== Chart performance ==
In Canada, "Thank U" topped the RPM 100 Hit Tracks chart for three consecutive weeks (six weeks if counting the holiday period in which no charts were published), becoming her fifth number-one single on that chart. On the Canadian Singles Chart, which tracked physical sales only, it stayed at number one for a single week in November 1998. In the United States, "Thank U" peaked at number 17 on the Billboard Hot 100 chart, on the issue date December 5, 1998. On the issue of November 28, 1998, "Thank U" topped the Adult Top 40 chart. It additionally peaked at number two on the Mainstream Top 40, number four on the Triple A chart, and number 12 on the Modern Rock Tracks chart.

"Thank U" was also successful in the Oceania region. In Australia, it debuted at number 20 and peaked at number 15 on the ARIA Singles Chart, becoming the album's only single that charted there. In New Zealand, the song proved to be more successful, debuting at number six and peaking at number two, becoming Morissette's highest charting-single in New Zealand, until "Hands Clean" peaked at number one in 2002. In Austria, it peaked at number 10, becoming her last top-ten single, while in Norway, "Thank U" was her highest charting-single, peaking at number three. In the United Kingdom, the song was the highest charting-single of Morissette's career, peaking at number five in a week when the whole top five was made up of new entries. Despite being her highest-charting UK single, it is her second-highest-selling single there, behind "Ironic", which reached number 11.

== Accolades ==
"Thank U" was nominated for Best Female Pop Vocal Performance at the 2000 Grammy Awards, but lost to Sarah McLachlan's "I Will Remember You". Morissette was nominated for a Juno Award for Songwriter of the Year (for writing the songs "So Pure", "Thank U" and "Unsent") at the 2000 edition. Additionally, the song entered About.com's "Top 10 Alanis Morissette Lyrics" list at number 3, with Bill Lamb picking the lyrics, "How about me not blaming you for everything/How about me enjoying the moment for once/How about how good it feels to finally forgive you/How about grieving it all one at a time" as the best.

ReDigi website also listed the "Top 10 Alanis Morissette Songs", picking "Thank U" as her third best song, writing that, "Most of the attention might have been focused on its revealing video, but the angst-ridden melancholy of 'Thank You' works just as well without images of Alanis wandering the streets in her birthday suit."

== Music video ==
A stranger (actor/producer Sanjay Pandya) places his hand on Morissette as she stands in the middle of the street.

The music video for the song was directed by French director Stéphane Sednaoui (who previously directed "Ironic" for Morissette) and premiered on October 12, 1998, on MTV's Total Request Live. It features Morissette walking around and being embraced by strangers in a variety of public locations, such as in the street, at a supermarket, and on a subway car. Throughout the video, Morissette is completely nude with her long hair shrouding her breasts and her pubic region blurred out. Slight modifications to the video were made before broadcasting by MTV in India and certain other Asian countries. Subsequent replays, however, aired the video in its original format. In May 2001, the video was voted number 66 on VH1's 100 Greatest Videos.

While being asked why she chose to be nude in the video, Morissette said, "Actually, the idea for that video hit me in my shower – I was thinking about the song and its simplicity and its baring itself, and I just thought, 'Wouldn't it be great if I could just walk around New York City or grocery stores in just a symbolism of being naked everywhere I went?'. Less about overt sexuality and more about the symbolism of being really raw and naked and intimate in all these environments where you'd seemingly need protection, like in a subway and those kinds of places. So that hit me in the shower and then we executed it." It was filmed in Downtown Los Angeles, under a closed set.

== Track listings ==
Canadian maxi-single and international CD single

1. "Thank U" (album version) – 4:18
2. "Pollyanna Flower" – 4:05
3. "Uninvited" (demo) – 3:02

UK 7-inch jukebox single

A. "Thank U" (album version)
B. "Uninvited" (demo)

== Charts ==
=== Weekly charts ===
Weekly chart performance for "Thank U"
Chart (1998–2017)	Peak position
Australia (ARIA)	15
Austria (Ö3 Austria Top 40)	10
Belgium (Ultratip Bubbling Under Flanders)	25
Belgium (Ultratip Bubbling Under Wallonia)	22
Canada (Nielsen SoundScan)	1
Canada Top Singles (RPM)	1
Canada Adult Contemporary (RPM)	9
Denmark (IFPI)	20
Europe (Eurochart Hot 100)	9
Germany (GfK)	19
Iceland (Íslenski Listinn Topp 40)	3
Ireland (IRMA)	13
Italy (FIMI)	5
Italy Airplay (Music & Media)	3
Netherlands (Dutch Top 40)	7
Netherlands (Single Top 100)	8
New Zealand (Recorded Music NZ)	2
Norway (VG-lista)	3
Poland Airplay (Music & Media)	9
Scottish Singles Sales (Official Charts)	4
Sweden (Sverigetopplistan)	49
Switzerland (Schweizer Hitparade)	18
UK Singles (Official Charts)	5
US Billboard Hot 100	17
US Adult Alternative Airplay (Billboard)	4
US Adult Pop Airplay (Billboard)	1
US Alternative Airplay (Billboard)	12
US Pop Airplay (Billboard)	2
US Adult Alternative (Radio & Records)	5
US Alternative (Radio & Records)	10
US CHR/Pop (Radio & Records)	1
US Hot AC (Radio & Records)	1
US Pop/Alternative (Radio & Records)	1

=== Year-end charts ===
1998 year-end chart performance for "Thank U"
Chart (1998)	Position
Australia (ARIA)	49
Canada Top Singles (RPM)	72
Canada Adult Contemporary (RPM)	49
Iceland (Íslenski Listinn Topp 40)	65
Netherlands (Dutch Top 40)	67
New Zealand (RIANZ)	34
UK Singles (OCC)	115
US Mainstream Top 40 (Billboard)	47
US Modern Rock Tracks (Billboard)	85
US Triple-A (Billboard)	49
US Adult Alternative (Radio & Records)	48
US Alternative (Radio & Records)	88
US CHR/Pop (Radio & Records)	44
US Hot AC (Radio & Records)	37

1999 year-end chart performance for "Thank U"
Chart (1999)	Position
Canada Top Singles (RPM)	85
Canada Adult Contemporary (RPM)	86
US Adult Top 40 (Billboard)	32
US Mainstream Top 40 (Billboard)	81
US Adult Alternative (Radio & Records)	89
US Hot AC (Radio & Records)	56

=== Decade-end charts ===
Decade-end chart performance for "Thank U"
Chart (1990–1999)	Position
Canada (Nielsen SoundScan)	90

== Certifications ==
Certifications for "Thank U"
Region	Certification	Certified units/sales
Australia (ARIA)	Gold	35,000^{^}
Norway (IFPI Norway)	Gold	
United Kingdom (BPI)	Gold	400,000^{‡}
^{^} Shipments figures based on certification alone.^{‡} Sales+streaming figures based on certification alone.

== Release history ==
Release dates and formats for "Thank U"
Region	Date	Format(s)	Label(s)	Ref.
Europe	October 12, 1998	CD	Maverick; Reprise	
Canada	October 13, 1998	CD	Maverick; Reprise	
United Kingdom	October 19, 1998	CD; cassette	Maverick; Reprise	
Japan	November 2, 1998	CD	Maverick; Reprise	
