= Joining You =

1998 single by Alanis Morissette

Single by Alanis Morissette

from the album Supposed Former Infatuation Junkie
- B-side: "These Are the Thoughts"; "London" (live); "Thank U" (live)
- Released: January 3, 1999
- Recorded: Mid-1998
- Studio: Royaltone (Los Angeles)
- Length: 4:26
- Label: Maverick
- Songwriters: Alanis Morissette; Glen Ballard
- Producers: Alanis Morissette; Glen Ballard

Alanis Morissette singles chronology
"Thank U" (1998)	"Joining You" (1999)	"So Pure" (1999)

Music video
- "Joining You" on YouTube

"Joining You" is a song by Canadian singer-songwriter Alanis Morissette from her fourth studio album, Supposed Former Infatuation Junkie (1998). It was released as the album's second single on January 3, 1999. "Joining You" peaked at number 16 on the US Billboard Modern Rock Tracks chart.

== Composition ==
The song distinctly is composed of a verse and chorus in two distantly related keys: C minor and E minor, respectively.

== Music video ==
Footage was shot for a video, but a completed video was never released as Morissette felt the visuals did not work with the song. A clip from one of the treatments for the footage was later released on the DVD included on the limited edition of Morissette's compilation album, The Collection (2005).

== Track listings ==
CD1

1. "Joining You" (Melancholy mix) – 4:24
2. "Joining You" (album version) – 4:24
3. "These Are the Thoughts" (non-album track) – 3:16
4. "Thank U" (BBC/Radio One live) – 4:13

CD2

1. "Joining You" (album version)
2. "Your House" (BBC/Radio One live)
3. "London" (Bridge School Benefit live) [non-album track]

German CD single

1. "Joining You" (Melancholy mix) – 4:24
2. "These Are the Thoughts" (non-album track) – 3:15
3. "Thank U" (BBC/Radio One live) – 4:13

== Charts ==
=== Weekly charts ===
Weekly chart performance for "Joining You"
Chart (1999)	Peak position
Austria (Ö3 Austria Top 40)	26
Canada Top Singles (RPM)	27
Canada Rock/Alternative (RPM)	14
Europe (Eurochart Hot 100)	81
France (SNEP)	89
Germany (GfK)	28
Italy (FIMI)	16
Italy Airplay (Music & Media)	9
Netherlands (Dutch Top 40 Tipparade)	11
Netherlands (Single Top 100)	51
Scottish Singles Sales (Official Charts)	26
Switzerland (Schweizer Hitparade)	46
UK Singles (Official Charts)	28
US Alternative Airplay (Billboard)	16
US Alternative (Radio & Records)	14

=== Year-end charts ===
Year-end chart performance for "Joining You"
Chart (1999)	Position
US Modern Rock Tracks (Billboard)	61
US Alternative (Radio & Records)	94

== Release history ==
Relesse dates and formats for "Joining You"
Region	Date	Format(s)	Label(s)	Ref.
Canada	January 3, 1999	CD	Maverick	
United Kingdom	March 1, 1999	CD; cassette	Maverick	
