= So Pure =

1999 single by Alanis Morissette

Single by Alanis Morissette

from the album Supposed Former Infatuation Junkie
- Released: March 10, 1999
- Recorded: Mid-1998
- Studio: Royaltone (Los Angeles)
- Length: 2:49
- Label: Maverick; Reprise
- Songwriters: Alanis Morissette; Glen Ballard
- Producers: Alanis Morissette; Glen Ballard

Alanis Morissette singles chronology
"Joining You" (1999)	"So Pure" (1999)	"Unsent" (1999)

Music video
- "So Pure" on YouTube

"So Pure" is a song written and produced by Alanis Morissette and Glen Ballard for Morissette's fourth album, Supposed Former Infatuation Junkie (1998). It was released in Japan as the album's second single on March 10, 1999, and as the third single worldwide in June 1999. One line in the song, "supposed former infatuation junkie", inspired its album's title. A special "radio friendly remix" was featured on US promotional singles and was only commercially released on the Australian domestic single.

"So Pure" peaked outside the top 20 on the US Billboard Adult Top 40 and Top 40 Mainstream charts, but inside the top 20 in Canada. "So Pure" failed to chart on the US Billboard Hot 100 and performed moderately in the United Kingdom, where it reached the top 40. In 2000, the song was nominated for Best Female Rock Vocal Performance at the 43rd Annual Grammy Awards but lost to Sheryl Crow's live version of "There Goes the Neighborhood", which original version was already nominated in the same category in 1999, but lost to "Uninvited" by Morissette. The music video won the award for Best Video at 2000 Juno Awards.

== Music video ==
The single's video, directed by Morissette, featured her and (then boyfriend) actor Dash Mihok as dance partners transitioning through time and style, from ballroom to salsa, swing, tap, contemporary and rave. It was filmed over two days in Toronto, Canada. Morissette said of the video, "Over the last year, I'd become enamored with the dancing styles of the '40s in particular, and intrigued by the evolution of dancing throughout the last five decades and the spirit and different kinds of attitudes that fuel them. When it came time to create this video, there was no question that there would be dancing in it and that these different eras needed to be referenced!" The video world-premiered on AOL on June 25, 1999, and was the first from a major artist to debut on the internet.

== Track listings ==
Canadian CD single

1. "So Pure" (album version) – 2:49
2. "I Was Hoping" (acoustic modern rock live) – 4:34
3. "So Pure" (Pure Ecstasy extended mix) – 6:04
4. "So Pure" (acoustic modern rock live) – 2:42

US promo CD

1. "So Pure" (radio friendly remix) – 2:39
2. "So Pure" (Pure Ecstasy mix) – 6:04
3. "So Pure" (album version) – 2:49

UK CD1

1. "So Pure" (album version) – 2:49
2. "I Was Hoping" (acoustic modern rock live) – 4:34
3. "So Pure" (Pure Ecstasy extended mix) – 6:04

UK CD2

1. "So Pure" (album version) – 2:49
2. "Would Not Come" (live) – 4:13
3. "So Pure" (acoustic modern rock live) – 2:42

Australian CD single

1. "So Pure" (album version)
2. "I Was Hoping" (acoustic modern rock live)
3. "So Pure" (Pure Ecstasy extended mix)
4. "So Pure" (Guido's radio friendly mix)

Japanese CD single

1. "So Pure" (album version)
2. "Your House" (BBC/Radio One live)
3. "London" (Bridge School Benefit live)

== Charts ==
=== Weekly charts ===
Chart (1999)	Peak position
Australia (ARIA)	112
Canada Top Singles (RPM)	14
Canada Rock/Alternative (RPM)	25
Canada CHR (Nielsen BDS)	10
Scottish Singles Sales (Official Charts)	37
UK Singles (Official Charts)	38
US Adult Pop Airplay (Billboard)	25
US Pop Airplay (Billboard)	38

=== Year-end charts ===
Chart (1999)	Position
US Adult Top 40 (Billboard)	95

== Release history ==
Region	Date	Format(s)	Label(s)	Ref.
Japan	March 10, 1999	CD	Maverick; WEA Japan	
Canada	June 14, 1999	CD	Maverick	
United States	June 28, 1999	Hot adult contemporary; modern adult contemporary; contemporary hit radio	Maverick; Reprise	
United Kingdom	July 19, 1999	CD; cassette	Maverick	
