= The Diamond Wink Tour =

2005 concert tour by Alanis Morissette

- Tour by Alanis Morissette
- Promotional poster for the tour
- Associated album: Jagged Little Pill Acoustic
- Start date: April 9, 2005
- End date: July 17, 2005
- Legs: 2
- No. of shows: 20 in Europe; 28 in North America; 48 in total

Alanis Morissette concert chronology
- Au Naturale Tour (2004); The Diamond Wink Tour (2005); Flavors of Entanglement Tour (2008–09)

The Diamond Wink Tour, also known as the Jagged Little Pill Acoustic Tour, was the fifth headlining concert tour by Canadian singer-songwriter Alanis Morissette. The tour celebrates the 10th anniversary release of the Jagged Little Pill album. Alanis took the commemorative date to re-record the album in an acoustic version, which was named Jagged Little Pill Acoustic. The 1st leg consisted of electric performances for big audiences throughout Europe, and the 2nd leg of acoustic performances at intimate venues throughout North America to promote the re-release of the album.

== Opening acts ==
- Gabriel Mann
- Jude
- Lionel Lodge
- Schmid Vera
- Squeeze Theeze Pleeze
- Blister
- Beltane
- Lullabye
- Jason Mraz

== Set list ==
Leg 1

This set list is representative of the performance in Budapest. It does not represent all concerts for the 1st Leg of the tour.

1. "Eight Easy Steps"
2. "All I Really Want"
3. "Hands Clean"
4. "Spineless"
5. "Perfect"
6. "Head Over Feet"
7. "Excuses"
8. "Hand in My Pocket"
9. "So Pure"
10. "A Man"
11. "You Learn"
12. "Everything"
13. "You Oughta Know"
14. "Wake Up"
  Encore 1
15. "Your House"
16. "Uninvited"
  Encore 2
17. "Ironic"
18. "Thank U"
Leg 2

This set list is representative of the performance in New Orleans. It does not represent all concerts for the 2nd Leg of the tour.

1. "Your House"
2. "You Learn"
3. "Not the Doctor"
4. "Perfect"
5. "Hand in My Pocket"
6. "Sister Blister"
7. "Head Over Feet"
8. "Forgiven"
9. "Mary Jane"
10. "Hands Clean"
11. "All I Really Want"
12. "Everything"
13. "Right Through You"
14. "Wake Up"
  Encore 1
15. "You Oughta Know"
16. "Uninvited"
  Encore 2
17. "Ironic"
18. "Thank U"

== Band ==
- Alanis Morissette – vocals/guitar/harmonica
- Jason Paul Orme – guitar
- Zac Rae – keyboards
- David Levita – guitar
- Cedric Lemoyne Williams – bass guitar
- Blair Sinta – drums
