= Au Naturale Tour =

2004 concert tour

- Tour by Barenaked Ladies and Alanis Morissette
- Location: North America
- Associated album: Everything to Everyone; So-Called Chaos
- Start date: July 13, 2004
- End date: August 14, 2004
- Legs: 1
- No. of shows: 24
Barenaked Ladies tour chronology
Everywhere for Everyone Tour (2004)	Au Naturale Tour (2004)	Barenaked for the Holidays Tour (2004–05)
Alanis Morissette tour chronology
So-Called Chaos Tour (2004)	Au Naturale Tour (2004)	The Diamond Wink Tour (2005)

The Au Naturale Tour was a co-headlining concert tour by Canadian rock band Barenaked Ladies and Canadian singer-songwriter Alanis Morissette. The tour promoted their albums, Everything to Everyone and So-Called Chaos. Over the course of a month, the tour played 24 shows in North America.

== Opening act ==
- Nellie McKay

== Setlist ==
Barenaked Ladies
1. "Brian Wilson"
2. "Some Fantastic"
3. "Maybe Katie"
4. "Enid"
5. "Testing 1,2,3"
6. "For You"
7. "Really Don't Know"
8. "One Week"
9. "Pinch Me"
10. "The Old Apartment"
11. "Center of Attention"
12. "Call and Answer" (performed with Morissette)
13. "Tonight Is the Night I Fell Asleep at the Wheel"
14. "The Humour of the Situation"
15. "It's All Been Done"
16. "Shopping"

Encore

17. "If I Had $1000000"
Alanis Morissette
1. "Eight Easy Steps"
2. "All I Really Want"
3. "Excuses"
4. "Not the Doctor"
5. "Head over Feet"
6. "This Grudge"
7. "So Pure"
8. "You Oughta Know"
9. "Uninvited"
10. "Hand in My Pocket"
11. "Ironic"

Encore

12. "Everything"
13. "You Learn" (performed with the Barenaked Ladies)
14. "Thank U"

== Tour dates ==
Date	City	Country	Venue
North America
July 13, 2004	Cuyahoga Falls	United States	Blossom Music Center
July 14, 2004	Columbus	United States	Germain Amphitheater
July 16, 2004	Wantagh	United States	Tommy Hilfiger at Jones Beach Theater
July 17, 2004	Holmdel Township	United States	PNC Bank Arts Center
July 18, 2004	Burgettstown	United States	Post-Gazette Pavilion
July 20, 2004	Noblesville	United States	Verizon Wireless Music Center
July 21, 2004	Tinley Park	United States	Tweeter Center
July 22, 2004	Milwaukee	United States	Marcus Amphitheater
July 25, 2004	Auburn	United States	White River Amphitheatre
July 26, 2004	Ridgefield	United States	The Amphitheater at Clark County
July 28, 2004	Mountain View	United States	Shoreline Amphitheatre
July 29, 2004	Los Angeles	United States	Greek Theatre
July 30, 2004	Los Angeles	United States	Greek Theatre
August 1, 2004	Albuquerque	United States	ABQ Journal Pavilion
August 2, 2004	Morrison	United States	Red Rocks Amphitheatre
August 4, 2004	Maryland Heights	United States	UMB Bank Pavilion
August 5, 2004	Atlanta	United States	HiFi Buys Amphitheatre
August 6, 2004	Raleigh	United States	Alltel Pavilion at Walnut Creek
August 8, 2004	Philadelphia	United States	Mann Center for the Performing Arts
August 9, 2004	Mansfield	United States	Tweeter Center for the Performing Arts
August 10, 2004	Columbia	United States	Merriweather Post Pavilion
August 12, 2004	Clarkston	United States	DTE Energy Music Theatre
August 13, 2004	Clarkston	United States	DTE Energy Music Theatre
August 14, 2004	Cincinnati	United States	Riverbend Music Center
