= Pitchfork Music Festival 2024 =

Music festival

- Dates: July 19–21, 2024
- Locations: Union Park, Chicago, United States
- Website: pitchforkmusicfestival.com

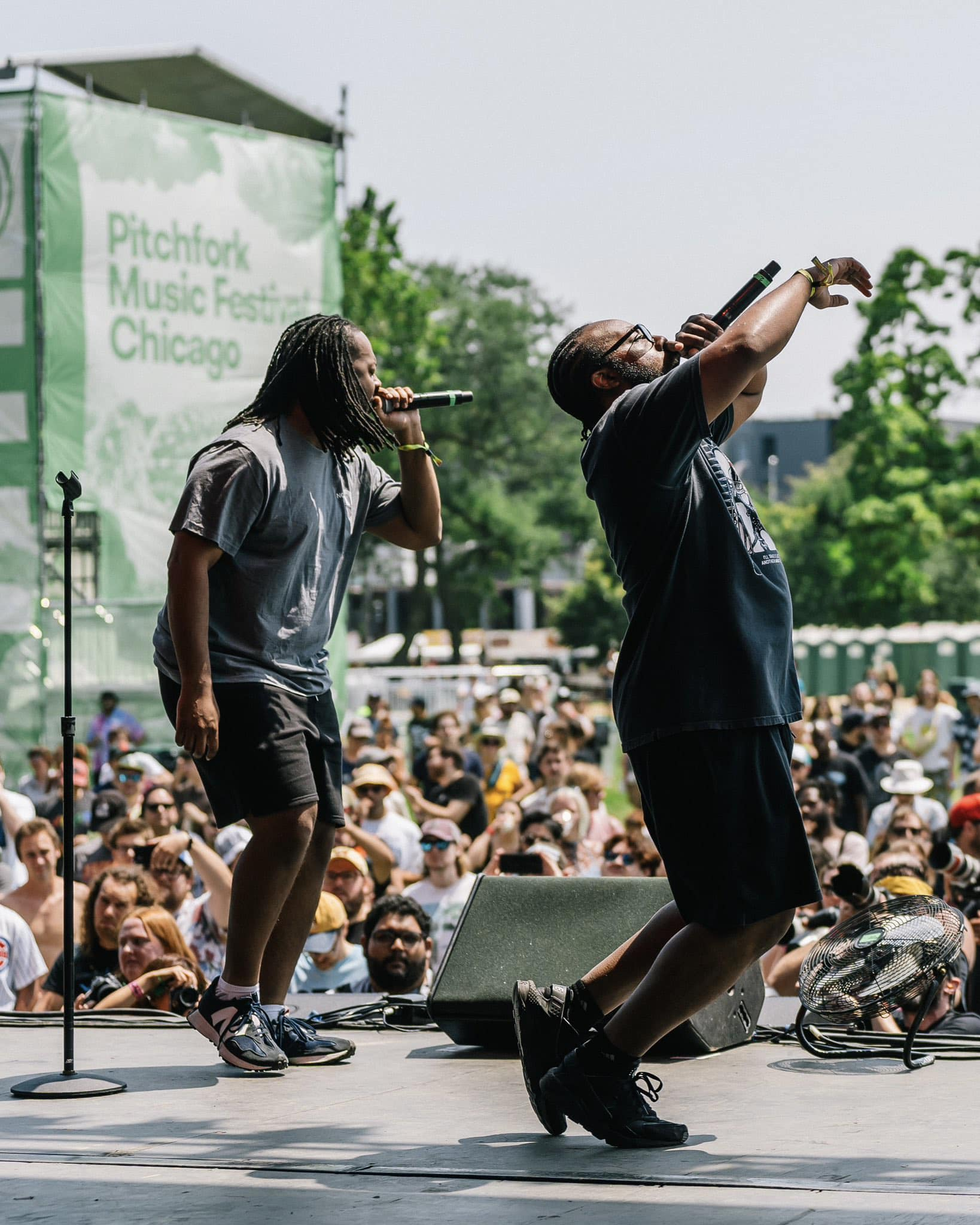
Quentin Branch (left) and Brian Warren (right) performing at Pitchfork Music Festivals in 2024

The Pitchfork Music Festival 2024 was held from July 19 to 21, 2024, at the Union Park, Chicago, United States. The festival was headlined by singer-songwriter Alanis Morissette, psychedelic soul duo Black Pumas, and disk jockey Jamie xx. It was followed by after shows in various venues around Chicago with a line-up, including Doss, Feeble Little Horse, Hailu Mergia, Model/Actriz, among others.

This year marks the festival's last edition, since Pitchfork announced that it would not host the festival in 2025.

== Headlining set lists ==
Black Pumas
1. "Fire"
2. "Sauvignon"
3. "Ice Cream (Pay Phone)"
4. "Confines"
5. "Gemini Sun"
6. "Angel"
7. "More Than a Love Song"
8. "Old Man"
9. "Know You Better"
10. "Black Moon Rising"
11. "Tomorrow"
12. "Rock and Roll"
13. "OCT 33"
14. "Colors"
Jamie xx
1. "Ghetto Shout Out!!" (Parris Mitchell Project cover)
2. "Baddy on the Floor"
3. "It's the Music" (Murphy Jax & Mike Dunn cover)
4. "Beginners" (Angelo Ferreri cover)
5. "KILL DEM"
6. "Frikitona" (Andruss cover)
7. "Pyrophobia" (Megra cover)
8. "Treat Each Other Right"
9. "Shine" (PROZAK cover)
10. "Movin'" (Neumonic cover)
11. "I Need Space" (Boulderhead cover)
12. "Idontknow"
13. "Brighter Dayz" (DJ Rashad cover)
14. "Don't Believe" (Henry Rodrick cover)
15. "This Is L.A." (Lemon D cover)
16. "Breather"
17. "I Need" (Known Artist cover)
18. "Gosh"
19. "Falling Together"
20. "Mr Ooh" (Tripmastaz cover)
21. "LET'S DO IT AGAIN"
22. "Loving" (O.C. cover)
23. "Life"
Alanis Morissette
1. "Hand in My Pocket"
2. "Right Through You"
3. "Reasons I Drink"
4. "A Man"
5. "Hands Clean"
6. "Can't Not"
7. "Lens"
8. "Sorry to Myself"
9. "Head over Feet"
10. "Reckoning"
11. "You Learn"
12. "Would Not Come"
13. "Smiling"
14. "Mary Jane"
15. "Forgiven"
16. "Ironic" with Muna
17. "Not the Doctor"
18. "Are You Still Mad"
19. "All I Really Want"
20. "Sympathetic Character"
21. "You Oughta Know"

Encore

22. "Uninvited"
23. "Thank U"

== Lineup ==
The lineup was announced on March 13, 2024. Headline performers are listed in boldface. Artists listed from latest to earliest set times.

**Green Stage**
Friday, July 19	Saturday, July 20	Sunday, July 21
**Black Pumas**; 100 gecs; billy woods & Kenny Segal; ML Buch; Black Duck	**Jamie xx**; Jessie Ware; Wednesday; Kara Jackson; Lifeguard	**Alanis Morissette**; Muna; Jessica Pratt; Maxo; Akenya

**Red Stage**
Friday, July 19	Saturday, July 20	Sunday, July 21
Jai Paul; Yaeji; Tkay Maidza; Angry Blackmen	Carly Rae Jepsen; De La Soul; Feeble Little Horse; L'Rain	Brittany Howard; Grandmaster Flash; Model/Actriz; Joanna Sternberg

**Blue Stage**
Friday, July 19	Saturday, July 20	Sunday, July 21
Jeff Rosenstock; Sudan Archives; Amen Dunes; Doss; Rosali	Unwound; Bratmobile; Sweeping Promises; Water from Your Eyes; Hotline TNT	Les Savy Fav; Crumb; Mannequin Pussy; Hailu Mergia; Nala Sinephro
