= The Singles Box =

Box set by Alanis Morissette
- Released: April 8, 1997
- Length: 1:22:05
- Label: Maverick, Warner Bros.
- Producer: Glen Ballard

Alanis Morissette chronology
Space Cakes (1995)	The Singles Box (1997)	Supposed Former Infatuation Junkie (1998)

Alanis Morissette – The Singles Box, commonly abbreviated simply as The Singles Box, is a compilation box set by Alanis Morissette, released on April 8, 1997, by Maverick. The set includes five of her six singles from 1995's Jagged Little Pill: "Ironic", "Hand in My Pocket", "Head over Feet", "You Learn" and "You Oughta Know", as well as live tracks and alternate versions of JLP tracks spread across five maxi-CDs. Also included in the box set is a short booklet of Alanis photos and other extras, including a note to her fans written by Morissette herself.

The Singles Box was released only in Europe and Australia in limited quantities.

Morissette's sixth single, "All I Really Want", is the only single that wasn't given a disc in The Singles Box. "All I Really Want" and "Mary Jane" are the only tracks from Jagged Little Pill that didn't appear in the set in any form.

== Track listing ==
All lyrics written by Alanis Morissette. All music written by Alanis Morissette and Glen Ballard.

=== CD 1: "You Oughta Know" ===
1. "You Oughta Know" – 4:09
2. "You Oughta Know" (Clean Album Version) – 4:08
3. "Perfect" (Studio Acoustic Version) – 3:06
4. "You Oughta Know" (Live at the 1996 Grammys) – 3:48

=== CD 2: "Ironic" ===
1. "Ironic" – 3:50
2. "Forgiven" (Live from Tokyo) – 6:10
3. "Not the Doctor" (Modern Rock Live from L.A.) – 6:05
4. "Wake Up" (Modern Rock Live from L.A.) – 5:06

=== CD 3: "You Learn" ===
1. "You Learn" – 4:00
2. "Your House" (Live from Tokyo) – 3:06
3. "Wake Up" (Modern Rock Live from L.A.) – 5:06
4. "Hand in My Pocket" – 3:42

=== CD 4: "Hand in My Pocket" ===
1. "Hand in My Pocket" (Clean Version) – 3:42
2. "Head Over Feet" (Live from Holland) – 4:11
3. "Not the Doctor" (Live from Holland) – 3:58

=== CD 5: "Head Over Feet" ===
1. "Head Over Feet" – 4:27
2. "You Learn" (Live from Michigan) – 4:15
3. "Right Through You" (Live from Michigan) – 3:12
4. "Hand in My Pocket" (Live from Brisbane) – 4:29
5. "Ironic" (Live from Sydney) – 4:35

== Credits ==
- All lyrics written by Alanis Morissette
- Music written by Alanis Morissette and Glen Ballard
- Produced by Glen Ballard
- Alanis Morissette: Vocals, Harmonica
