= Space Cakes =

EP by Alanis Morissette
- Released: October 25, 1995 (Japan)
- Label: Maverick; Reprise

Alanis Morissette chronology
Jagged Little Pill (1995)	Space Cakes (1995)	The Singles Box (1997)

Space Cakes is an EP by Alanis Morissette, released only in Japan in 1995. It comprises acoustic recordings of some of the songs from her third studio album, Jagged Little Pill. In other countries, these have been released as B-sides.

The recordings were made in the NOB studios in Hilversum, the Netherlands, on June 9, 1995, for Jan Douwe Kroeske's radio program, 2 Meter Sessies. A seventh recording, "Hand in My Pocket", was never released (at the time), though it has been aired. All seven tracks of the EP were included as bonus tracks on the Target-exclusive deluxe edition of Jagged Little Pill, released on October 30, 2015.

== Track listing ==
1. "Head over Feet"
2. "Right Through You"
3. "Forgiven"
4. "Perfect"
5. "Not the Doctor"
6. "You Learn"
