= Jagged Little Pill (disambiguation) =

Jagged Little Pill is a 1995 album by Alanis Morissette.

Jagged Little Pill may also refer to:

- Jagged Little Pill (musical), a 2018 musical inspired by Morissette's 1995 album
- Jagged Little Pill Acoustic, a 2005 album by Alanis Morissette
- Jagged Little Pill Tour, also called the Can't Not Tour, Morissette's debut concert tour
- Jagged Little Pill, Live, a Grammy award-winning video chronicling the Jagged Little Pill Tour
- "Jagged Little Pill", an episode of Degrassi: The Next Generation (season 1)

== See also ==
- Jagged Little Thrill, a 2001 album by American R&B group Jagged Edge
