= Jagged Little Pill, Live =

Video by Alanis Morissette
- Released: July 1, 1997
- Recorded: April 1995 – December 14, 1996
- Directors: Alanis Morissette, Steve Purcell
- Producers: Alanis Morissette, David May, Glen Ballard, Steve Purcell

Alanis Morissette chronology
Jagged Little Pill, Live (1997)	Live in the Navajo Nation (2002)

Jagged Little Pill, Live is a video chronicling Alanis Morissette's Jagged Little Pill world tour from 1995 to 1996. It was primarily filmed in New Orleans, Louisiana, United States, but it features clips from various other tour stops, including Morissette's hometown of Ottawa, Ontario, Canada. All of the Jagged Little Pill album is featured on this release.

The video won a Grammy Award for "Best Long Form Music Video".

== Track listing ==
1. "Welcome the Charmed Ones I'm Sure" – 1:19
2. "All I Really Want" – 5:45
3. "The Craziness" – 3:06
4. "Right Through You" – 3:13
5. "Sexual Chocolate Intros" – 1:53
6. "Not the Doctor" – 6:24
7. "Synergy" – 0:36
8. "Hand in My Pocket" – 4:58
9. "Enuf About Me" – 2:33
10. "10 Feathers" – 0:21
11. "Head over Feet" – 5:05
12. "Mary Jane" – 6:02
13. "He Would for Someone" – 1:18
14. "Forgiven" – 5:36
15. "Spotless Pseudo Home" – 0:13
16. "Perfect" – 3:55
17. "Release Not Revenge" – 1:08
18. "You Oughta Know" – 5:14
19. "Wake Up" – 7:38
20. "Explosion of Blueness" – 1:59
21. "Ironic" – 4:23
22. "Under Arrest" – 0:13
23. "You Learn" – 7:42
24. "Your House" – 4:11
25. "No Pressure over Cappuccino/The Culprits" – 2:08

== Personnel ==
- Alanis Morissette – vocals, harmonica, guitar
- Chris Chaney – bass
- Taylor Hawkins – drums, percussion
- Nick Lashley – guitar, background vocals
- Jesse Tobias – guitar, background vocals

== Certifications ==
Region	Certification	Certified units/sales
Australia (ARIA)	Platinum	15,000^{^}
United Kingdom (BPI)	Gold	25,000^{*}
^{*} Sales figures based on certification alone.^{^} Shipments figures based on certification alone.
