= Jagged Little Pill Acoustic =

2005 re-recorded album by Alanis Morissette

Studio album (re-recorded) by Alanis Morissette
- Released: June 13, 2005
- Studios: Westlake (Los Angeles, California); Aerowave (Encino, California)
- Genre: Acoustic rock
- Length: 58:54
- Labels: Maverick; Warner Bros.
- Producer: Glen Ballard

Alanis Morissette chronology
So-Called Chaos (2004)	Jagged Little Pill Acoustic (2005)	The Collection (2005)

Singles from Jagged Little Pill Acoustic
- 1. "Hand in My Pocket" Released: July 2005

Jagged Little Pill Acoustic is a re-recorded studio album by Alanis Morissette. It is a largely acoustic retrospective version of her highly successful third album, Jagged Little Pill (1995); the songs are stripped-down versions of the originals, though producer Glen Ballard has augmented them with studio production effects to create an alternative pop album. The album was released by Maverick Records in the United States on June 13, 2005 (the 10th anniversary of the original album), available only at North American Starbucks outlets until July 26, 2005, when it was made available in other retail stores. This limited availability led to a dispute between Maverick Records and HMV Canada, who retaliated by removing from sale Morissette's other albums for the duration of Starbucks' exclusive month-long sale. The album's single in the U.S. was "Hand in My Pocket". The cover artwork is a sepia-toned tribute to the cover of the original Jagged Little Pill.

== Reception ==
The release received mostly negative reviews from critics. The album scored 40/100 on Metacritic, indicating generally unfavorable reception.

Much of the criticism centered on the versions losing the original's raw energy and emotional intensity. Reviewers noted the acoustic versions were "blandly matured" and lacked the original album's "anger and angst". One critic described Mojo's assessment as "a second rate version of the original".

The re-recordings were criticized for softening rather than sharpening the originals' jagged edges. Entertainment Weekly wrote that the album was "pretty, but mostly free of innovation, softening rather than sharpening the originals' enjoyably jagged edges". NME remarked that the album "can't even make you feel angry; just desperately sad".

Some critics questioned the commercial necessity of the release. Drowned in Sound called it "about as welcome as a bout of testicular cancer". MusicOMH noted "an element of sly marketing at play" while conceding the album's quality "cannot be underestimated".

Reviewers argued that stripping away the electrified sound was unnecessary given that MTV Unplugged (1999) had already featured prominent acoustic performances. Additionally, two tracks on the original 1995 album—"Perfect" and "Mary Jane"— were already acoustic to begin with.

Professional ratings
Aggregate scores
Source	Rating
Metacritic	40/100
Review scores
Source	Rating
AllMusic	3/5 stars
Blender	2/5 stars
Drowned in Sound	2/10
Entertainment Weekly	B
Mojo	2/5 stars
NME	0/10
PopMatters	3/10
Q	3/5 stars
Rolling Stone	2.5/5 stars
Uncut	1.5/5 stars

== Track listing ==
All lyrics are written by Alanis Morissette; all music is composed by Alanis Morissette and Glen Ballard.

No.	Title	Length
1.	"All I Really Want"	5:24
2.	"You Oughta Know"	4:58
3.	"Perfect"	3:26
4.	"Hand in My Pocket"	4:32
5.	"Right Through You"	3:40
6.	"Forgiven"	4:43
7.	"You Learn"	4:10
8.	"Head over Feet"	4:17
9.	"Mary Jane"	5:08
10.	"Ironic"	3:57
11.	"Not the Doctor"	4:26
12.	"Wake Up" / "Your House" (hidden track)	9:56
Total length:		58:54

== Personnel ==
- Alanis Morissette – lead vocals, harmonica
- David Levita – guitars, marxophone, perapaloshka, mandolin
- Blair Sinta – drums, percussion, maraca, cajon
- Zac Rae – pianoforte, keyboards, organ, pump organ
- Jason Orme – guitars
- Cedric Lemoyne – bass
- Glen Ballard – string arrangements
- Suzie Katayama – string arrangements, conductor
- Ralph Morrison – violin I
- Sara Parkins – violin II
- Roland Kato – viola
- Steve Erdody – cello

Technical

- Glen Ballard – producer
- Bill Malina – mixing and recording

== Charts ==
=== Album ===
Chart (2005)	Peak position
Australian Albums (ARIA)	21
Austrian Albums (Ö3 Austria)	9
Belgian Albums (Ultratop Flanders)	19
Belgian Albums (Ultratop Wallonia)	6
Dutch Albums (Album Top 100)	16
French Albums (SNEP)	8
German Albums (Offizielle Top 100)	15
Irish Albums (IRMA)	11
Italian Albums (FIMI)	38
Scottish Albums (Official Charts)	67
Spanish Albums (Promusicae)	42
Swiss Albums (Schweizer Hitparade)	5
UK Albums (Official Charts)	12
US Billboard 200	50

=== Singles ===
Year	Title	Chart positions			
Year	Title	CAN	GER	SPA	ITA
2004	"Hand In My Pocket (Acoustic)"	23	58	7	42

== Certifications ==
Region	Certification	Certified units/sales
United Kingdom (BPI)	Gold	100,000^{‡}
^{‡} Sales+streaming figures based on certification alone.
