= Live in the Navajo Nation =

Alanis Morissette: Live in the Navajo Nation

Video by Alanis Morissette
- Released: August 27, 2002 (U.S.)
- Length: 53 min.
- Label: Image Entertainment

Alanis Morissette chronology
Jagged Little Pill, Live (1997)	Alanis Morissette: Live in the Navajo Nation (2002)	Feast on Scraps (2002)

Live in the Navajo Nation is an Alanis Morissette DVD/VHS released in 2002 (see 2002 in music). It is part of the Music in High Places series and was recorded in October 2000 in Arizona, United States. It was released on August 27, 2002.

== Track listing ==
1. "Baba"
2. "That I Would Be Good"
3. "No Pressure over Cappuccino"
4. "UR"
5. "Heart of the House"
6. "Your House"
7. "I Was Hoping"
8. "Uninvited"
9. "Ironic"
