= Ironic (song) =

1996 single by Alanis Morissette

- Canadian limited edition of North American artwork

Single by Alanis Morissette

from the album Jagged Little Pill
- B-side: "You Oughta Know" (acoustic/live); "Forgiven" (live); "Not the Doctor" (live); "Wake Up" (live)
- Released: February 27, 1996
- Studio: Westlake, Signet Sound (Hollywood, California)
- Genre: Alternative rock; folk rock
- Length: 3:48
- Label: Maverick; Warner Bros.
- Songwriters: Alanis Morissette; Glen Ballard
- Producer: Glen Ballard

Alanis Morissette singles chronology
"Hand in My Pocket" (1995)	"Ironic" (1996)	"Head over Feet" (1996)

Music video
- "Ironic" on YouTube

"Ironic" is a song by Canadian singer-songwriter Alanis Morissette, released in February 1996 by Maverick and Warner Bros. Records as the fourth single from her third studio album, Jagged Little Pill (1995). It was written by Morissette and Glen Ballard, and was produced by him. The lyrics present several unfortunate situations labelled as "ironic", prompting debate over whether they reflect the accepted meaning of irony.

For six weeks, the track topped the Canadian RPM 100 Hit Tracks chart, becoming the second-most-successful song of the year in the country. It also reached the top five in Australia, Israel, New Zealand, and Norway, and the top ten in seven additional countries. In the United States, the song reached number four, remaining Morissette's highest-charting single on the Billboard Hot 100. "Ironic" has received multiple certifications, including those in Canada, the United Kingdom, and the US.

French director Stéphane Sednaoui filmed the music video. In it, Morissette drives through a winter landscape while portraying multiple passengers. It received six nominations at the 1996 MTV Video Music Awards, winning three of them, and was listed on VH1's "Greatest Music Videos" list. It also won the Juno Award for Single of the Year, and received two Grammy Award nominations in 1997, for Record of the Year and Best Short Form Music Video.

"Ironic" was included on the set list of Morissette's Jagged Little Pill Tour (1995), and on later releases, including MTV Unplugged (1999) and The Collection (2005). She also re-recorded an acoustic version of "Ironic", with slight changes to the lyrics, for her album Jagged Little Pill Acoustic (2005). Singers such as Kelly Clarkson and Avril Lavigne have covered the song, and the video has been parodied as well.

== Writing and composition ==
=== Composition ===
"Ironic"
A 23-second sample of the first verse and refrain of "Ironic". Tom Breihan of Stereogum wrote about Morissette’s delivery in the verse.

"Ironic" was written by Alanis Morissette and Glen Ballard, who also produced it, for her third studio album, Jagged Little Pill (1995). In a 2001 interview with Christopher Walsh of Billboard, Ballard explained how he and Morissette met and wrote the song in less than 15 minutes: "'Ironic' was the third song we wrote. Oh God, we were just having fun. I thought 'I don't know what this is—what genre it is—who knows? It's just good'". Morissette said "Ironic" was penned as a warm-up and not intended to be recorded for the album, but many people encouraged her to include it, because of its tune. She considers the lyrics to be non-autobiographical and more akin to storytelling, although she liked the music.

An anthemic alternative rock and "bubbling folk rock" song with a Cocteau Twins-style sound, "Ironic" is set in common time, with a moderate tempo of 82 beats per minute, and played in the key of B major. During the track, Morissette's vocals range from the tone of E_{5} to B♯_{5}, and the chord progression starts with the sequence of Emaj7–F♯_{6}–Emaj7–F♯_{6}, before changing to F♯–A♯–Badd2–F♯–A♯–G♯m_{7} in the verse and refrain. "Ironic" was recorded at Westlake Recording Studios and Signet Sound Studios, both in Hollywood, California. Ballard plays the guitar along with Basil Fung, Lance Morrison plays the bass guitar, Rob Ladd plays the drums and percussion, and Michael Thompson plays the organ. Chris Fogel was responsible for the audio mixing.

Tom Breihan of Stereogum describes the lyrics as a series of "coincidences, dramatic turns of fate, funny little nothings" intended to sound ironic (for example, "It's like rain on your wedding day"), in which Morissette later reaffirms this by asking the audience whether they are ironic ("Isn't it ironic, don't you think?"). The song opens with an acoustic guitar, soon joined by Morissette's softly controlled vocals. Breihan mentions that she lingers the letter "c" in "ironic" and clings tightly to the word "rain", while the refrain's chords shift rapidly as a hip-hop drum machine enters. At the end of the refrain, Morissette sings "it figures", but pronounces it "figgers".

Breihan considers that a scene from the 1994 film Reality Bites served as an inspiration for the song. In it, Winona Ryder's character asks Ethan Hawke's character to define irony, and he replies, "It's when the actual meaning is the complete opposite of the literal meaning". Breihan also compares the lyrics of "Ironic" to those of "Mmm Mmm Mmm Mmm" by Crash Test Dummies, saying that both tell stories of misfortune, but the former has a refrain.

=== Linguistic dispute ===
Morissette on "Ironic"
"For me the great debate on whether what I was saying in 'Ironic' was ironic wasn't a traumatic debate. I'd always embraced the fact that every once in a while I'd be the malapropism queen. And when Glen and I were writing it, we were not doggedly making sure that everything was technically ironic."

"Ironic"'s use of the word irony attracted media attention. According to Jon Pareles of The New York Times, the song conveys a distinctly "unironic" sense in its implications. According to the Oxford English Dictionary, irony is defined as "a state of affairs or an event that seems deliberately contrary to what was or might be expected; an outcome cruelly, humorously, or strangely at odds with assumptions or expectations". From a prescriptivist perspective, lyrics such as "it's a free ride when you've already paid" and "a traffic jam when you're already late" do not meet this definition of irony.

Comedian Ed Byrne performed a skit in which he jokingly criticized the song for its lack of ironies: "The only ironic thing about that song is it's called 'Ironic' and it's written by a woman who doesn't know what irony is. That's quite ironic." In 2014, Michael Reid Roberts wrote a defence of the song for Salon, saying that it cites situational ironies, in which circumstances or events have opposing expected results, and often produce a wry or understated sense of amusement.

Morissette said she initially felt embarrassed of the lyrics, and noted that, from then on, people kept pointing out the mistakes, which basically amounted to telling her "'you're a [dumbass]' for your malapropism". She added she did not expect the song to become a worldwide hit and be scrutinized for lyrics lacking much thought. She pointed out that the meaning of irony has changed since the release, with newer definitions, including that of Webster's Dictionary, being more aligned with the lyrics. Breihan criticized those who mocked her, saying that the controversy surrounding "Ironic" had transformed into "a popular intellectual punching bag" and "an excuse for smug pedantry".

Morissette later started poking fun at the situation. During a 2013 performance of "Semicolon" with The Lonely Island on Jimmy Kimmel Live!, where Morissette cut off their song to explain that their use of hashtag rap to demonstrate a semicolon is incorrect, to which they respond that critique of their grammar is "ironic". Similarly, in a 2015 performance, Morissette sang an updated version of "Ironic" on The Late Late Show with James Corden, in which she added the line "it's singing 'Ironic' when there are no ironies".

In a 2020 interview with Songfacts, Ballard reflected on the aftermath of the dispute, accepting the public debate over its definition, finding it amusing and ultimately enjoying the discussion. He mentioned his background in English literature, including work on T. S. Eliot, understanding that the song uses irony in a loose, non-technical sense.

== Release and promotion ==
Warner Bros. Records sent "Ironic" to US contemporary hit radio on February 13, 1996, and one day after the 39th Annual Grammy Awards ceremony, the single was physically released on February 27, 1996. It was also released in Canada and France on the same date, in the United Kingdom on April 8, 1996, Germany on April 19, 1996, and Japan on June 25, 1996.

Some versions of the CD single included a live version of "You Oughta Know", which she performed at the Grammy Awards ceremony, as a B-side. Other versions include live versions of "All I Really Want", "Forgiven", "Mary Jane", "Not the Doctor", and "Wake Up".

=== Live performances and other versions ===
"Ironic" was included in the set list for Morissette's concert tour, Jagged Little Pill World Tour (1995). Several performances were included in the tour's video compilation, Jagged Little Pill, Live (1997). Since its release, "Ironic" has been included in her live and compilation albums The Singles Box (1997), MTV Unplugged (1999), Feast on Scraps (2002), Live in the Navajo Nation (2002), and The Collection (2005). It also appears on the 1997 compilation albums published by the Grammys and MTV Unplugged series. Additionally, she included "Ironic" in the set list of her subsequent tours, including the Flavors of Entanglement Tour (2008–2009) and Guardian Angel Tour (2012).

With "Ironic", Morissette expressed her support for same-sex marriage. In March 2004, Morissette amended a lyric during the 15th GLAAD Media Awards, where she changed the word "wife" to "husband" ("It's meeting the man of my dreams / And then meeting his beautiful husband"). She commented to USA Today that her support for same-sex unions "goes a step further than clever lyrics". She added that she would like to officiate weddings for her gay friends. Later in June 2004, she said to VH1 that she would be "honored to support the gay community in that way", recalling that she had spontaneously done so for a couple at a radio station.

Morissette recorded an acoustic version of the song featuring the revised lyric for her 2005 album Jagged Little Pill Acoustic. Morissette performed this song's version with Avril Lavigne live at the House of Blues in that same year. Morissette also sang the acoustic version on her 25th anniversary tour, in 2020.

Morissette brought her daughter on stage on June 23, 2024, to sing "Ironic" to mark both her daughter's birthday and the song's upcoming 30th anniversary. The performance aired on Breakfast Television on Citytv.

== Critical response ==
Breihan graded "Ironic" 7 out of 10, concluding his review by stating that, "Maybe hundreds of years from now, some evolved version of humanity will continue to wonder if any of the things described in 'Ironic' are actually ironic. Maybe they won't be such dicks about it". Pareles noted that in verses of "Ironic", and another song from the album ("Mary Jane"), "it's easy to envision Morissette on the stage of a club" setting with acoustic backing. He also commented in another article that the song was "unironic". Stephen Thomas Erlewine of AllMusic selected "Ironic" as a highlight, while in a separate unsigned review from the website rated it with two-and-a-half out of five stars. Cam Lindsay for Vice called it the album's standout track, naming it a "bona fide karaoke jam". When it came to the acoustic version on Jagged Little Pill Acoustic (2005), Jaime Gill of Dot Music called it "more relaxed and engaging" than the 1996 album version, while Dave Brecheisen of PopMatters considered the acoustic version inferior, explaining that her vocal delivery becomes grating, and the lyrics come across as even more absurd than before.

"Ironic" won the Juno Award for Single of the Year at the 1997 ceremony, and in the same year, it was nominated for a Grammy Award in the category of Record of the Year at the 39th Grammy Awards.

=== 2001 Clear Channel memorandum ===
In September 2001, in the aftermath of the September 11 attacks, "Ironic" was included on a list by Clear Channel Communications of songs with "questionable lyrics", commonly known as the Clear Channel memorandum. This was likely due to the song's second verse, which depicts an aviophobic man referred to as "Mr. Play-It-Safe" aboard a flight that ends up crashing.

== Commercial performance ==
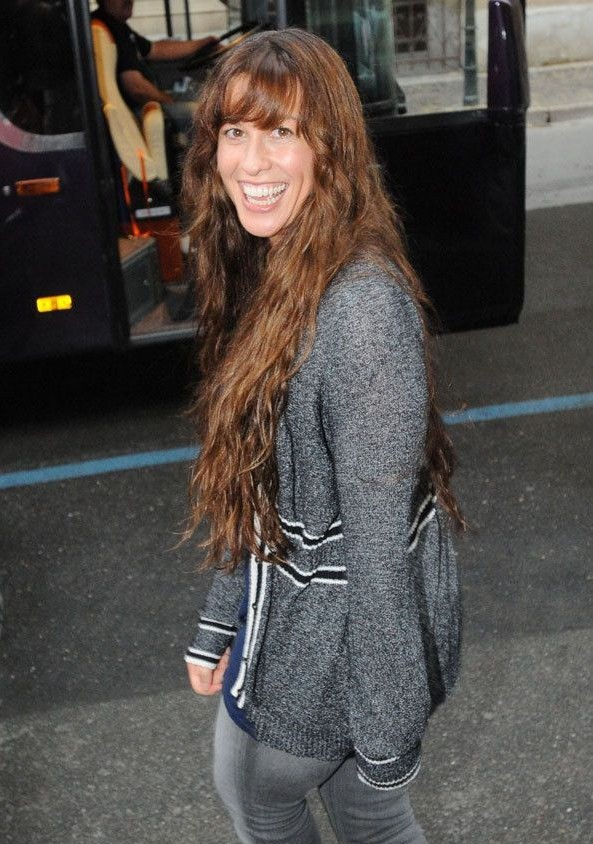
Morissette in 2008. "Ironic" is her highest-charting single in the United States.

In Canada, "Ironic" debuted on the radio-only RPM 100 Hit Tracks at number 95 on the issue dated January 8, 1996. Twelve weeks later, it topped the chart on April 1, 1996, remaining there for six weeks. It spent 29 weeks in the top 100 and was last seen on July 22, 1996, at number 81. It spent 14 weeks in the top 10 and was the second-highest-charting song of 1996, behind Morissette's own "You Learn". On other RPM charts, the single topped the Alternative 30 for one week, spending 11 weeks in the top 10, finishing 1996 as the fifth-highest-charting song of the year. It reached number six on the Adult Contemporary Tracks chart.

In the US, the track debuted at number 11 on the Billboard Hot 100 following its commercial release, becoming the highest debut on the issue ending March 16, 1996. The single eventually reached a peak of number four, on April 13, 1996. and remains Morissette's highest-charting hit on the Hot 100. On other US charts, the single became her third number-one hit on the Billboard Modern Rock Tracks chart, where it stayed for three weeks. The song topped the Top 40/Mainstream chart, reached number five on Adult Top 40, and peaked at number 28 on the Adult Contemporary chart. On May 1, 1996, the Recording Industry Association of America (RIAA) certified the single gold, denoting sales of 500,000 copies.

In Australia, the song debuted at number 40 on the ARIA Singles Chart. In its eighth week, it peaked at number three on May 12, 1996, remaining there for two weeks. As of 2026, "Ironic" is her best-charting song in the country. It was certified double-platinum by the Australian Recording Industry Association (ARIA), indicating sales of 35,000 copies. In New Zealand, where the song was released as a double A-side with "You Oughta Know", it debuted at number 13 on April 21, 1996, peaked at number three on May 19, spending a total of 11 weeks in the top 50. The solo single was certified triple-platinum by the Recording Industry Association of New Zealand (RIANZ), representing sales of 90,000 copies, while the double-A side single received a gold certification, denoting 5,000 copies sold.

In the United Kingdom, "Ironic" debuted at and peaked at number 11 on April 20, 1996. It left the chart eight weeks later at number 67. On the Norwegian Singles Charts, it debuted at number 18, and later peaked at number four, staying there for five weeks. "Ironic" remained on the chart for seventeen weeks. In January 2025, the song was certified double-platinum by the British Phonographic Industry (BPI), denoting 1,200,000 units sold and streamed in the UK. In Belgium, reached number six on the Ultratop 50 (Flanders region) and number nine on the Ultratop 50 (Wallonia region).

== Music video ==
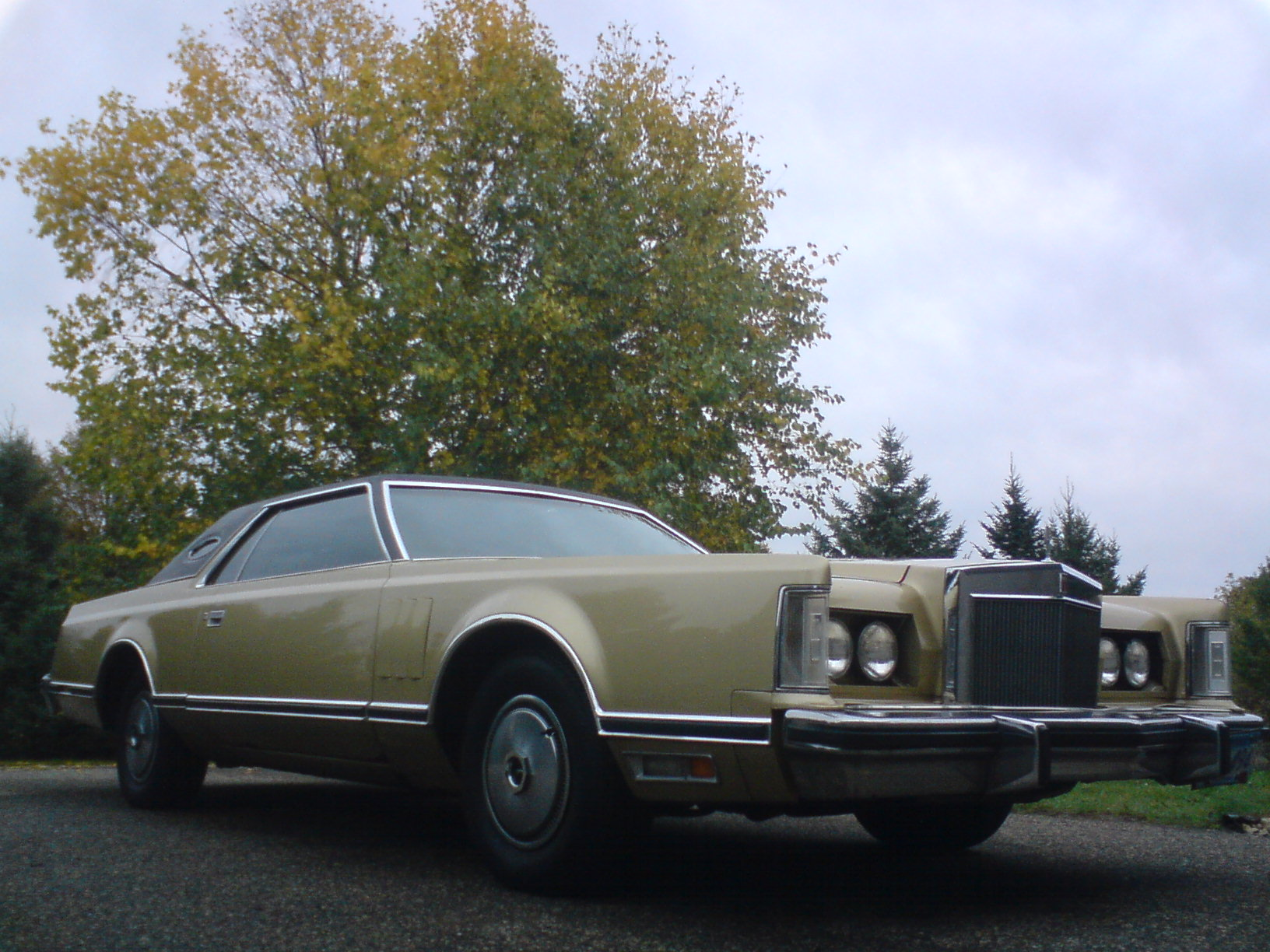
A Lincoln Continental Mark V. In the music video, Morissette drives a similar car.

Stéphane Sednaoui directed the music video for "Ironic", and it was released on January 23, 1996. It was filmed on the snowy streets of Brooklyn, New York.

In the beginning of the video, Morissette is at a gas station, walking to her automobile with a cup of coffee in her hand. She then drives her car through a winter landscape, and she begins to sing the song's first verse. During the chorus, a second Morissette appears in the backseat on the passenger side, wearing a green sweater and singing euphorically. After the first chorus, a third version appears in the backseat on the driver's side, wearing a yellow sweater and braided hair. This version sings and eats simultaneously. In the second verse, a fourth and final version appears in the front passenger seat, wearing a red sweater.

During the second chorus, the red-sweater version climbs out of the window while the car is still moving and nearly hits a bridge, but smiles afterward. The camera then returns to the driving Morissette; after the breakdown, she removes her beanie, tosses it into the backseat, and sings more forcefully alongside the others. In the outro, she continues driving through the winter landscape until she looks at the dashboard surprised as the vehicle comes to a stop, possibly due to running out of gas. She exits the vehicle and walks away, only to find that the other versions of herself have disappeared.

In an interview for Vogue in 2015, Morissette explained that her clothes in the video reflect the personalities of each character. The driver, rearing a red knit beanie, was in control, the Morissette in a yellow sweater was the "quirkster". She wears braids because Morissette liked them so much that she would often wear them on stage. The passenger seat companion, who wears a red sweater and pajama-style pants, was "the romantic-wistful[,] thoughtful and also the risk-taker", while the last Morissette in green sweater is the closest representation of the real Morissette, describing her as "fun[ny] and frolic-y".

Blaine Allan noted in the book Television: Critical Methods and Applications (2002) how Morissette interacts with the viewer. He commented that unlike the music video for "Lucky", by Britney Spears, where she plays a dual role as a girl named "Lucky" and her fan, with both appearing together through visual effects, "Ironic" does not utilize them, relying solely on editing to create the sense that all versions of Morissette interact with one another.

=== Reception ===
Author Carol Vernallis found that Morissette's conversational singing style creates a sense of intimacy with the viewer. In her book Experiencing Music Video: Aesthetics and Cultural Context (2004), she discussed how audiences attend to song lyrics in music videos, adding that the "Ironic" music video functions as a limited example of how lyrical meaning can become "inaccessible" when set to video and broadcast. Charles Aaron of Spin described the "Ironic" music video as "neat", and Liana Satenstein called it a "classic chime-in" for Vogue.

The video received six nominations at the 1996 MTV Video Music Awards: Video of the Year, Best Direction in a Video, Viewer's Choice, Best Female Video, Best New Artist in a Video and Best Editing, winning the latter three. It was nominated in 1997 for the Grammy Award for Best Short Form Music Video. It was also ranked at number 18 on VH1's 100 Greatest Videos.

In 1996, it was parodied by Jimmy the Cab Driver, a character from MTV promos portrayed by Donal Logue. Another parody version of the video was released featuring a six-year-old Canadian girl named Allison Rheaume, who mimics Morissette's actions and wardrobe while lip syncing to the original song. At the end, her father notices her in the car sitting in the driveway and tells her to stop fooling around. It was directed by David Rheaume.

The comedy website CollegeHumor released a spoof video of the song called "Actually Ironic", featuring actress Sarah Natochenny, in which the lyrics were amended in a form that would be appropriately ironic. For example, "it's like rain on your wedding day, to the Egyptian sun god Ra. The CollegeHumor spoof was similarly replicated in July 2013 with a song called "It's Finally Ironic", by sisters Rachael and Eliza Hurwitz, who published their version on YouTube. The sisters adjusted the lyrics to reflect irony. For example, "it's a black fly in your Chardonnay, that was specifically purchased to repel black flies", adding: "We fixed it for you, Alanis. You're welcome" in the refrain.

In 2018, Toronto R&B singer Ramriddlz honored "Ironic" on the music video for his single "Worst Love".

== Covers and use in media ==
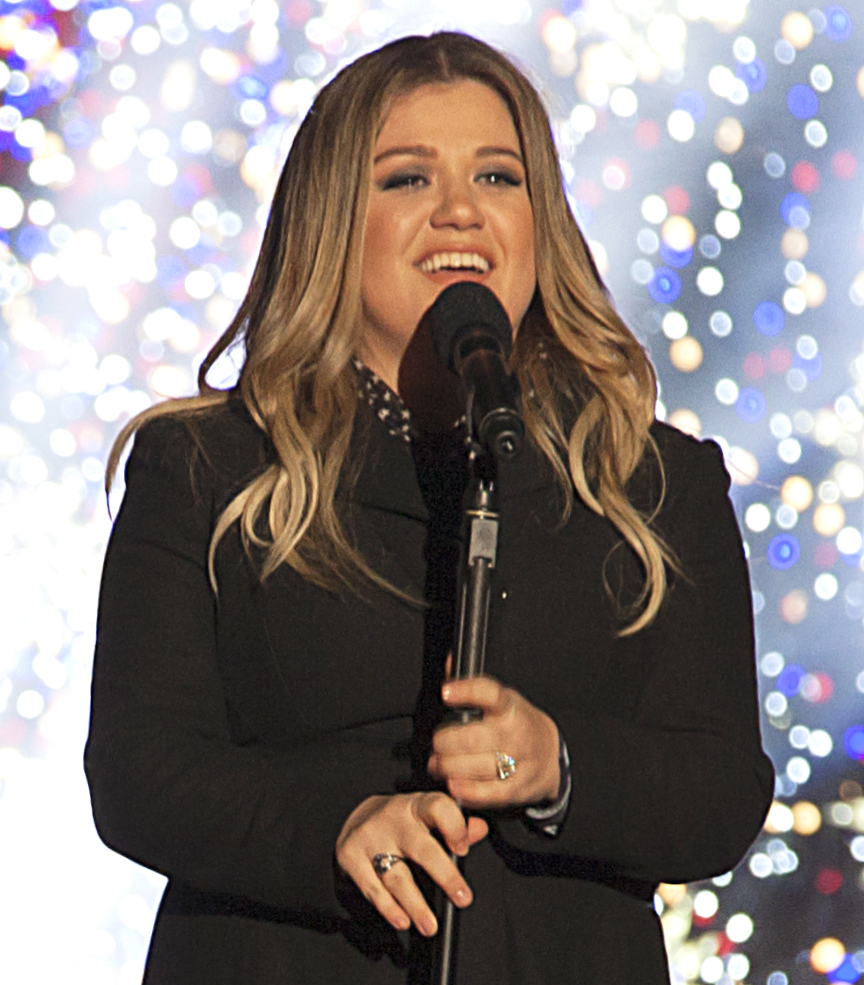
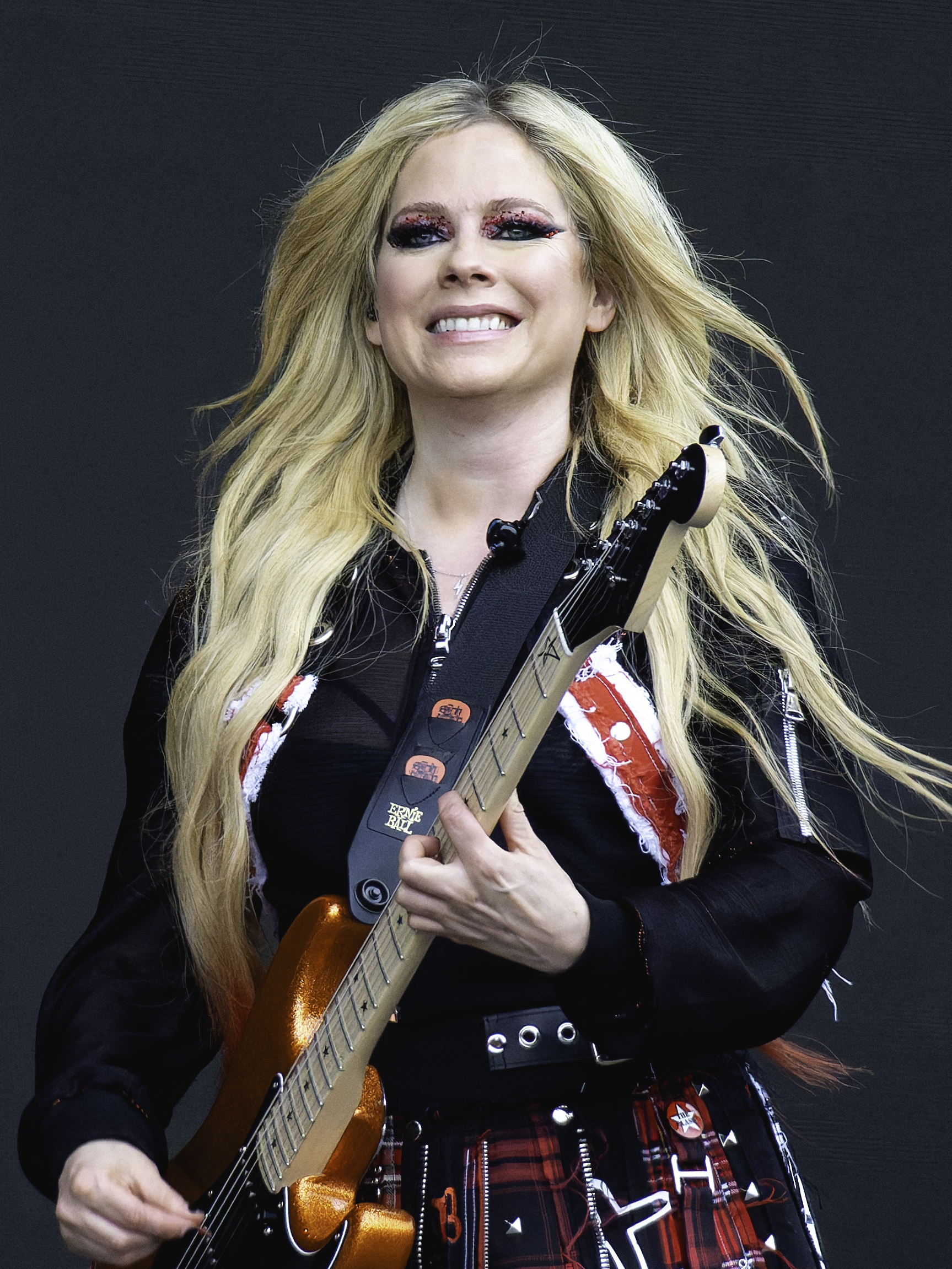
Singers like Kelly Clarkson (left) and Avril Lavigne (right) have covered the song either solo or in duets with Morissette.

In 1998, the American pop rock band Self parodied the song under the title "Moronic" for their internet-exclusive compilation album Feels Like Breakin' Shit. In 2003, Ji-In Cho covered the song for the German version of the Fame Academy talent show, which appeared on the German charts. "Ironic" was covered by Mexican duo Jesse & Joy for their acoustic album Esta Es Mi Vida Sesiones (2007). Pop punk band Four Year Strong recorded it for their 1990s cover album Explains It All (2009), in which the song has a heavier arrangement over down-tuned guitars and double-bass drumming.

"Ironic" was featured in the romantic comedy film I Could Never Be Your Woman (2007), where Saoirse Ronan, as Izzie Mensforth, sings an altered version of the lyrics. It also made an appearance as the opener to 2013 comedy film The Internship, starring Owen Wilson and Vince Vaughn, as they sing along to it.

In his song "Word Crimes" (2014), "Weird Al" Yankovic references Morissette's lyrics by singing "irony is not coincidence", and the music video for the song shows a fire truck burning (depicted as "Irony") compared with rain during a wedding (which is described as "Weather"). In 2015, Morissette appeared on The Late Late Show with James Corden and sang a version of the song with new lyrics "updated" for the technology era, and an homage to the linguistics of the original mentioned above.

In 2018, Jagged Little Pill was adapted into a musical by Diablo Cody. "Ironic" is sung in a scene in which Frankie Healy reads a short story that consists of the song’s lyrics. She is interrupted by classmates, who say it is not ironic but rather depicts unfortunate events. Phoenix, a new student, defends her writing and encourages her to finish, and romantic attraction sparks.

In January 2022, Kelly Clarkson covered "Ironic" on her television show The Kelly Clarkson Show, as part of her "Kellyoke" segment. The next year, Morissette joined her on the show and performed acoustic duets of "Ironic" and "You Oughta Know". Lavigne released a solo cover for the 2025 film Mile End Kicks, which was released theatrically in Canada in April 2026.

== Track listings ==
- CD single, cassette
1. "Ironic" – 3:49
2. "You Oughta Know" (acoustic/live from the Grammy Awards) – 3:48
3. "Mary Jane" (live) – 5:52
4. "All I Really Want" (live) – 5:22
- Special-edition maxi-CD single
1. "Ironic" (album version) – 3:48
2. "Forgiven" (live) – 6:09
3. "Not the Doctor" (live) – 6:05
4. "Wake Up" (live) – 5:05

== Personnel ==
Personnel are adapted from the "Ironic" CD single.

- Alanis Morissette – vocals, producer, writer
- Glen Ballard – producer, guitar, writer
- Lance Morrison – bass guitar
- Rob Ladd – drums and percussion
- Michael Thompson – organ
- Basil Fung – guitar
- Chris Fogel – mixing

== Charts ==
=== Weekly charts ===
Weekly chart performance
Chart (1996)	Peak position
Australia (ARIA)	3
Belgium (Ultratop 50 Flanders)	6
Belgium (Ultratop 50 Wallonia)	9
Canada Top Singles (RPM)	1
Canada Adult Contemporary (RPM)	6
Canada Rock/Alternative (RPM)	1
Croatia (HR Top 40)	3
Europe (Eurochart Hot 100)	22
Europe Airplay (European Hit Radio)	4
France (SNEP)	16
Germany (GfK)	8
Iceland (Íslenski Listinn Topp 40)	8
Ireland (IRMA)	8
Israel (Israeli Singles Chart)	1
Netherlands (Dutch Top 40)	6
Netherlands (Single Top 100)	6
New Zealand (Recorded Music NZ) with "You Oughta Know"	3
Norway (VG-lista)	4
Scottish Singles Sales (Official Charts)	9
Sweden (Sverigetopplistan)	24
Switzerland (Schweizer Hitparade)	9
UK Singles (Official Charts)	11
UK Airplay (Music Week)	5
US Billboard Hot 100	4
US Adult Alternative Airplay (Billboard)	7
US Adult Contemporary (Billboard)	28
US Adult Pop Airplay (Billboard)	5
US Alternative Airplay (Billboard)	1
US Mainstream Rock (Billboard)	18
US Pop Airplay (Billboard)	1
US Rhythmic Airplay (Billboard)	11
US Cash Box Top 100	3
US Active Rock (Radio & Records)	18
US Adult Alternative (Radio & Records)	7
US Alternative (Radio & Records)	1
US CHR/Pop (Radio & Records)	1
US CHR/Rhythmic (Radio & Records)	15
US Hot AC (Radio & Records)	6
US Pop/Alternative (Radio & Records)	1
US Rock (Radio & Records)	10

Chart (2015)	Peak position
Poland Airplay (ZPAV)	81

Chart (2021)	Peak position
Canada Digital Song Sales (Billboard)	42

=== Year-end charts ===
Year-end chart performance
Chart (1996)	Position
Australia (ARIA)	25
Belgium (Ultratop 50 Flanders)	31
Belgium (Ultratop 50 Wallonia)	45
Canada Top Singles (RPM)	2
Canada Adult Contemporary (RPM)	37
Canada Rock/Alternative (RPM)	5
Europe (Eurochart Hot 100)	61
Europe Airplay (European Hit Radio)	9
France (SNEP)	57
Germany (Media Control)	40
Iceland (Íslenski Listinn Topp 40)	38
Israel (Israeli Singles Chart)	2
Netherlands (Dutch Top 40)	39
Netherlands (Single Top 100)	46
Norway (VG-lista)	19
Switzerland (Schweizer Hitparade)	51
UK Airplay (Music Week)	17
US Billboard Hot 100	13
US Adult Top 40 (Billboard)	14
US Mainstream Rock Tracks (Billboard)	82
US Modern Rock Tracks (Billboard)	18
US Top 40/Mainstream (Billboard)	1
US Top 40/Rhythm-Crossover (Billboard)	54
US Active Rock (Radio & Records)	75
US Adult Alternative (Radio & Records)	31
US Alternative (Radio & Records)	20
US CHR/Pop (Radio & Records)	4
US CHR/Rhythmic (Radio & Records)	53
US Hot AC (Radio & Records)	18
US Rock (Radio & Records)	59

== Certifications ==
Certifications and sales for "Ironic"
Region	Certification	Certified units/sales
Australia (ARIA)	Gold	35,000^{^}
Denmark (IFPI Danmark)	Gold	45,000^{‡}
France (SNEP)	Gold	250,000^{*}
Italy (FIMI) sales since 2009	Gold	35,000^{‡}
New Zealand (RMNZ) with "You Oughta Know"	Gold	5,000^{*}
New Zealand (RMNZ) "Ironic" solo single	3× Platinum	90,000^{‡}
Norway (IFPI Norway)	Gold	
Spain (Promusicae)	Gold	30,000^{‡}
United Kingdom (BPI)	2× Platinum	1,200,000^{‡}
United States (RIAA)	Gold	600,000
^{*} Sales figures based on certification alone.^{^} Shipments figures based on certification alone.^{‡} Sales+streaming figures based on certification alone.

== Release history ==
Release dates and formats for "Ironic"
Region	Date	Format(s)	Label	Ref(s).
United States	February 13, 1996	Contemporary hit radio	Warner Bros.	
Canada	February 27, 1996	CD single; cassette single; maxi single	Warner Bros.	
France	February 27, 1996	CD single; cassette single; maxi single	Warner Bros.	
United States	February 27, 1996	CD single; cassette single; maxi single	Warner Bros.	
United Kingdom	April 8, 1996	CD single; cassette single	Maverick	
Germany	April 19, 1996	CD single; cassette single	Warner Bros.	
Japan	June 25, 1996	CD single	Maverick; Reprise	

== See also ==
- List of Mainstream Top 40 number-one hits of 1996 (U.S.)
- List of RPM number-one singles of 1996 (Canada)
- List of RPM Rock/Alternative number-one singles (Canada)
- Number one modern rock hits of 1996
