= Jagged Little Pill =

1995 album by Alanis Morissette

Studio album by Alanis Morissette
- Released: June 13, 1995
- Recorded: 1994–1995
- Studios: Westlake, Los Angeles, California; Signet Sound West Hollywood, California
- Genres: Alternative rock; post-grunge
- Length: 57:23
- Labels: Maverick; Reprise
- Producer: Glen Ballard

Alanis Morissette chronology
Now Is the Time (1992)	Jagged Little Pill (1995)	Space Cakes (1995)

Singles from Jagged Little Pill
- 1. "You Oughta Know" Released: July 10, 1995; 2. "You Learn" Released: September 25, 1995; 3. "Hand in My Pocket" Released: October 16, 1995; 4. "Ironic" Released: February 27, 1996; 5. "Head over Feet" Released: July 22, 1996; 6. "All I Really Want" Released: November 25, 1996

Jagged Little Pill is the third studio album by Canadian-American singer Alanis Morissette, released by Maverick on June 13, 1995. Recorded in Hollywood at Westlake with production by Glen Ballard, it was Morissette's first album to be released worldwide. It marks a significant stylistic departure from the dance-pop sound of her first two efforts, Alanis (1991) and Now Is the Time (1992). She began work on the album after moving from her hometown Ottawa to Los Angeles, where she met Ballard. The pair had an instant connection and began co-writing and experimenting with sounds. The experimentation resulted in an alternative rock album that takes influence from post-grunge, hip-hop and pop rock, and features guitars, bass, keyboards, drum machines, and harmonica. The lyrics touch upon themes of aggression and unsuccessful relationships, while Ballard introduced a pop sensibility to Morissette's angst. The title of the album is taken from a line in the first verse of the song "You Learn".

Jagged Little Pill received positive reviews from critics, who praised its music and Morissette's lyrics and vocals. At the 38th Grammy Awards, it received nine Grammy Award nominations, of which it won five: Album of the Year, making her the youngest artist to win the award at the time; Best Rock Album; Best Female Rock Vocal Performance ("You Oughta Know"); Best Rock Song ("You Oughta Know"); and Best Long Form Music Video. It was certified ten times platinum by the British Phonographic Industry (BPI), seventeen times platinum by the Recording Industry Association of America (RIAA), and double diamond by Music Canada, making Morissette the first Canadian artist to achieve double diamond. With combined sales of over 33 million copies worldwide, Jagged Little Pill is one of the best-selling albums of all time. It has been included on several all-time lists, such as those of Apple Music, the Rock and Roll Hall of Fame and Rolling Stone.

The album has been re-released twice: on October 30, 2015, in a two-disc deluxe edition and a four-disc collector's edition commemorating its 20th anniversary; and on June 26, 2020, in a 25th anniversary deluxe edition. An acoustic re-recording of the album was released on June 13, 2005, to mark its 10th anniversary. It inspired a musical stage production, which premiered at the American Repertory Theater in Cambridge, Massachusetts, on May 5, 2018; it transferred to Broadway the following year, and was nominated for 15 Tony Awards, including Best Musical. A world tour celebrating the 25th anniversary of Jagged Little Pill began in early 2020 but was postponed due to the COVID-19 pandemic.

== Background ==
In 1991, MCA Records Canada released Morissette's debut studio album Alanis, which went Platinum in Canada. Her second album Now Is the Time sold a little more than half the copies of her first album. With her two-album deal complete, Morissette was left without a recording contract. In 1993, Morissette's publisher Leeds Levy at MCA Music Publishing introduced her to manager Scott Welch. Welch told HitQuarters he was impressed by her "spectacular voice", her character and her lyrics. At the time she was still living with her parents in Ottawa. Together they decided it would be best for her career for her to move to Toronto and start writing with other people.

After graduating from high school, Morissette made the move. Her publisher funded part of her development and when she met producer and songwriter Glen Ballard, he believed in her talent enough to let her use his studio.

== Recording ==
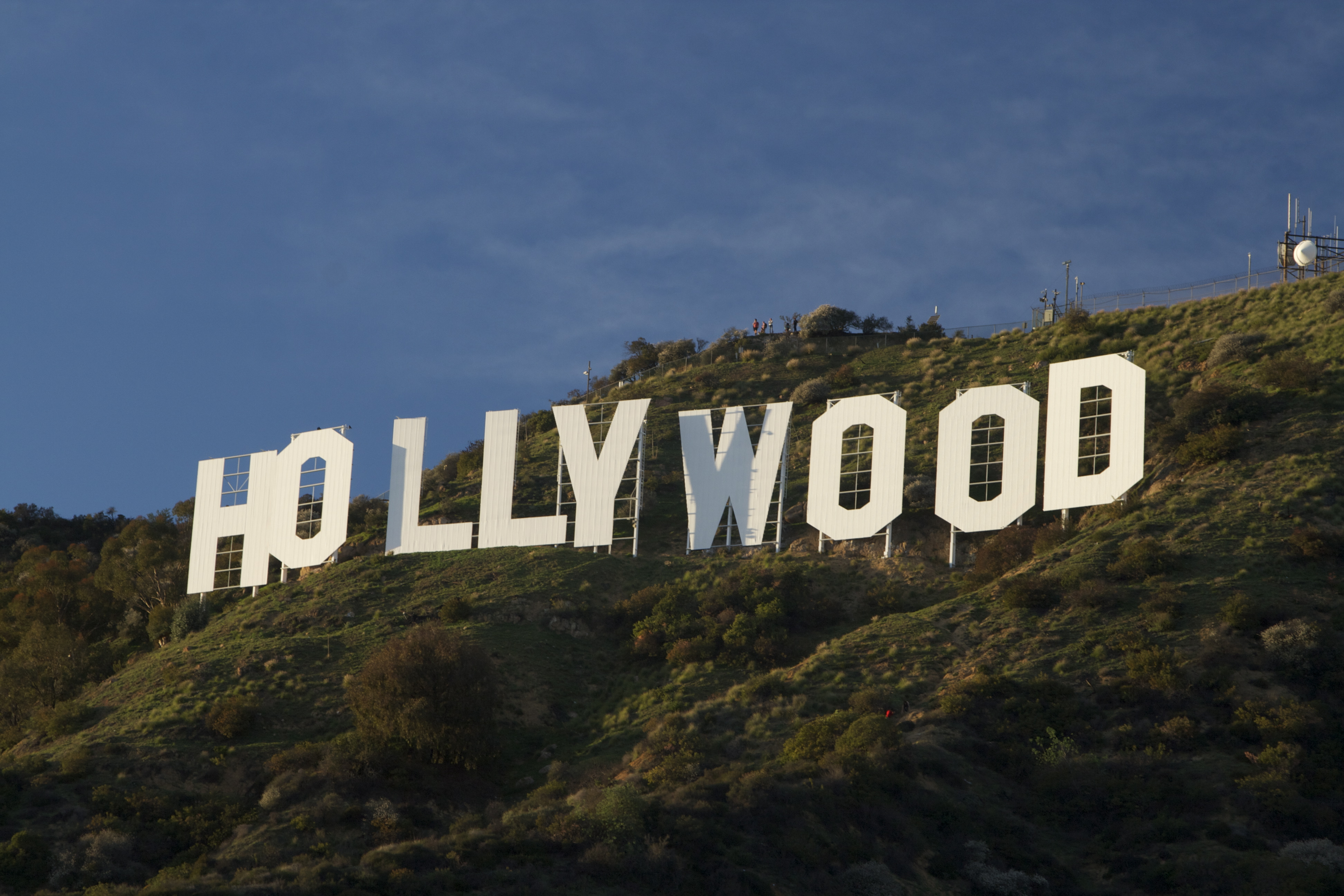
Jagged Little Pill was recorded in Hollywood after Morissette relocated there and met with Glen Ballard.

Morissette co-wrote the album solely with Ballard, who also produced the album. The demo recording sessions started in 1994 at Ballard's home studio, and included only Morissette and Ballard as the producer, who recorded the songs as they were being written. Ballard provided the rough tracks, playing the guitars, keyboards, and programming drum machines, and Morissette played harmonica. The duo sought to write and record one song a day, in twelve- or sixteen-hour shifts, with minimal overdubbing later. All of Morissette's singing on the album respects that rule, each recorded in one or two takes. The tracks that were redone later in a professional studio used the original demo vocals.

Ballard met Morissette in 1994 when his publishing company matched them up. According to Ballard, the connection was "instant", and within 30 minutes of meeting each other they had begun experimenting with different sounds in Ballard's home studio in San Fernando Valley, California. Ballard also declared to Rolling Stone that, "I just connected with her as a person, and, almost parenthetically, it was like 'Wow, you're 19?' She was so intelligent and ready to take a chance on doing something that might have no commercial application. Although there was some question about what she wanted to do musically, she knew what she didn't want to do, which was anything that wasn't authentic and from her heart." The first track the pair wrote was "The Bottom Line", which was not included on the album's initial release, but was included on the album's 2015 re-release. The song was written in one hour, immediately after they met.

The album's most successful single "Ironic" was the third track to be written for the album. In an interview with Christopher Walsh of Billboard, Ballard explained how he and Morissette met, and how "Ironic" was written. He commented: "I'm telling you, within 15 minutes we were at it — just writing. 'Ironic' was the third song we wrote. Oh God, we were just having fun. I thought 'I don't know what this is — what genre it is — who knows? It's just good'."

The lead single, "You Oughta Know", has guitar by Dave Navarro and bass by Flea of Red Hot Chili Peppers. The song was written with a different instrumentation; the pair were then asked to re-write the music – something Navarro described as being "A lot like a remix ... The structure of the song was in place but there were no guide tracks, we just had the vocal to work from. It was just a good time and we basically jammed until we found something we were both happy with. Alanis was happy too."

The first song to be shown to A&R and record company people was "Perfect", with a simple arrangement containing only Morissette's vocals and Ballard's acoustic guitar. In December 1994, the duo took the demos to a studio and began working on full band arrangements for 5 songs: "You Oughta Know", "Right Through You", "Forgiven", "Wake Up" and "Mary Jane". Los Angeles engineer Chris Fogel engineered the sessions. By January 1995, having been passed over by many labels, Ballard was considering an independent release before Morissette's lawyer Ken Hertz arranged a meeting with Guy Oseary, who worked at A&R for Maverick Records. Oseary said he got interested in working with Morissette right at the beginning of "Perfect", which he would later describe as "the first time I heard anyone tell stories that way and express themselves in such a manner", and within two days Morissette was signed with the label.

== Content ==
Jagged Little Pill departed from Morissette's previous releases – Alanis and Now Is the Time – that predominantly featured dance-pop. To underscore this transformation and establish herself on the international stage, Morissette adopted her full name professionally, moving beyond her previous mononym "Alanis". This deliberate change in both musical direction and personal branding signaled a new chapter in her career, setting the stage for her breakthrough international debut. All of the lyrics were written by Morissette. Morissette stated that during the process of making the album, she was in a bad mental condition after being robbed at gunpoint, suffering from angst and daily panic attacks, and tried to overcome her troubled feelings by expressing her emotions in the lyrics. She said that her goal was "doing work that is a completely truthful side of yourself", adding that "I say things in my songs that I wouldn't say in normal conversation or even the most serious talk."

The album opens with "All I Really Want". It features harmonica, swirly guitars and canned drums, and is in a grunge-pop vein. The lyrics talk about "intellectual intercourse" and a mental connection with another angry, frustrated, frightened, uncomfortable soul. The lyrics of "You Oughta Know" have been described as exploring themes of "raw anger and frank portrayal of female sexuality".

"Hand in My Pocket" is a cataloging of contradictions set over fuzzy guitar and a '90s drum machine. It portrays a lighter side to Morissette, with lyrics that touch upon themes of her self-effacing and hopeful side. "Right Through You" is a grunge song with angry lyrics about sleazy record bosses who prey on female artists who they want to "Wine dine and sixty-nine" rather than actually supporting their musical careers.

"Forgiven" draws on Morissette's Catholic upbringing. "I was told," she recalled, "that if I wasn't a virgin when I was a teenager, I must be a real whore. I believed that if I had sex I would be damned in hell forever." "You Learn" is a mid-tempo self-help rock song, with Morissette giving out advice; "Ditch the fear, open your heart, speak your mind, and when the going gets tough, walk around the house naked." It also is the source of the album title Jagged Little Pill, which Morissette stated that reflected how "a lot of times when I’m immersed in something really difficult, I don’t realize that there’s a lesson in there somewhere and that it’s only in retrospect that I’ll realize why I went through it. So the lyric following it is ‘just swallow it down, it feels so good swimming in your stomach’ ... so there's some sort of a payoff, and it may not be right away." "Head over Feet" is a ballad that contains guitar and drum box backing, with plainspoken vocals. The lyrics talk about Morissette being a "handful", and that she's not the type to get emotional.

"Perfect" is thought to be about internalised negativity, the pressure to do well and approval. Meanwhile, "Mary Jane" is built over a ballad's tense and ringing electric guitar. It addresses themes about depression and anorexia as it sees Morissette trying to reassure a friend who's having a rough time. In 2010 a writer suggested it was an example of an anti-rhetorical argument about taking action. Though the name "Mary Jane" is another name for marijuana, the song seems not to be about the plant.

"Ironic" is a pop rock song, set in the time signature of common time, composed in a moderate tempo of eighty-two beats per minute. The song's use of situational irony led to some fascination with whether it is a correct application of the term ironic. According to the Oxford English Dictionary "irony" is "a figure of speech in which the intended meaning is the opposite of that expressed by the words used" making lyrics such as "It's like rain on your wedding day" not ironic.

The closing "Wake Up" takes the shape of a cry for help to an apathetic world.

The album cover, featuring photography by John Patrick Salisbury and art direction by Thomas Recchion, combines a picture of Morissette crouched atop a cliff in Malibu, California, and another of her face with various shades of red, blue and green, and typewriter-style fonts.

== Release and promotion ==
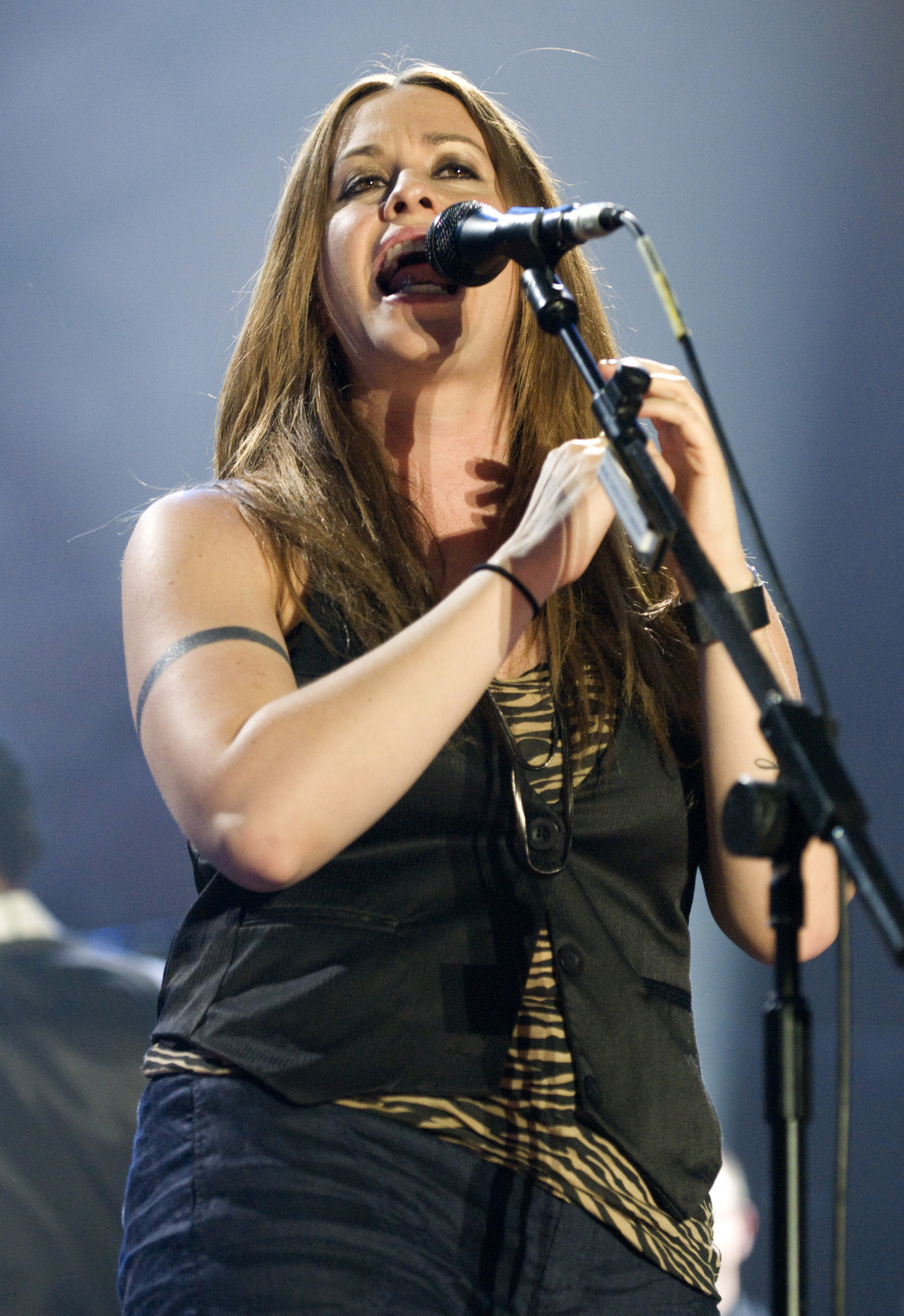
Alanis Morissette performing a live concert at the Espacio Movistar, Barcelona, June 2008.

Maverick Records released Jagged Little Pill internationally in 1995. The album was expected only to sell enough for Morissette to make a follow-up, but the situation changed quickly when KROQ-FM, an influential Los Angeles modern rock radio station, began playing "You Oughta Know", the album's lead single. The song instantly garnered attention for its scathing, explicit lyrics, a subsequent music video went into heavy rotation on MTV and MuchMusic in Canada, and the song rapidly ascended the Billboard Modern Rock Tracks chart peaking at No. 1 for five weeks, the most ever by a female artist to that date. Soon after US Top 40 and Album Rock radio stations began playing the song and it reached No. 7 and No. 3 on the Mainstream Top 40 and Album Rock Track charts, respectively.

After the success of "You Oughta Know", the album's other hits helped send Jagged Little Pill to the top of the Billboard Album Chart. "Hand in My Pocket" was the next track released; it topped the Modern Rock chart and reached No. 8 and No. 4 on the Mainstream Top 40 and Album Rock Track charts, respectively. While top 40 and album rock stations were still catching up to modern rock radio stations on playing the first two tracks, "All I Really Want" was promoted at modern rock stations and reached No. 14 on the Modern Rock chart. The fourth U.S. single, "Ironic", became Morissette's biggest hit, partly due to the unique music video featuring four identical but differently dressed Alanises driving around in the same car. The video was nominated for six MTV Video Music Awards in 1996 winning three including "Best Female Video". "Ironic", which was released as a physical single, therefore, becoming the first track off Jagged Little Pill eligible for the Billboard Hot 100, peaked at No. 4 on the Hot 100, while also hitting No. 1 on the Modern Rock and Mainstream Top 40 charts. "You Learn" and "Head over Feet", the fifth and sixth singles, also topped the Mainstream Top 40 chart, reached No. 7 and No. 25 on the Modern Rock chart, but were not picked up by Mainstream Rock stations, instead charting highly on the Adult Alternative ("You Learn" No. 2; "Head Over Feet" No. 11) and Adult Top 40 charts ("Head Over Feet" No. 1: "You Learn" No. 3), with a single of "You Learn" backed with Morissette's Grammy Award performance of "You Oughta Know" peaking at No. 6 on the Hot 100. The parade of singles kept Jagged Little Pill (1995) in the top 10 on the Billboard 200 albums chart for 72 weeks.

Morissette toured Jagged Little Pill worldwide for 18 months, supported by Radiohead. She also opened for Neil Young and his band Crazy Horse for several European dates in summer 1996, together with Foo Fighters, Manic Street Preachers and Dodgy. A live video was released on VHS and DVD, Jagged Little Pill, Live, and won a Grammy Award for Best Long Form Music Video.

On the album's tenth anniversary in 2005, Morissette released an acoustic version of the album, Jagged Little Pill Acoustic. This album was originally sold through Starbucks' Hear Music brand in an exclusive six-week deal that ended on July 26, 2005. For the duration of this partnership, music retailer HMV boycotted the sale of Morissette's entire catalogue in Canada. The album was released on June 15, 2005, ten years to the day after the original United States release. The artwork of the acoustic version is similar to the original version, but is sepia-tinted instead. On October 30, 2015, Jagged Little Pill was reissued by Rhino Records and Warner Music Group to mark its 20th anniversary. A two-disc deluxe edition contains a newly remastered version of the album, appended with ten demo recordings, two of which were previously released on the "Joining You" single in 1999. A limited four-disc collector's edition also adds 2005's Acoustic album and a full live concert recorded in London at Subterranea on September 28, 1995. As with the Acoustic release, this edition also updated the cover artwork; this time presented in white and gold and labeled as Jagged Little Pill • Collector's Edition.

== Reception ==
Professional ratings
Review scores
Source	Rating
AllMusic	4.5/5 stars
Chicago Tribune	2/4 stars
Christgau's Consumer Guide	B+
Entertainment Weekly	C+
Los Angeles Times	3.5/4 stars
NME	7/10
The Philadelphia Inquirer	3.5/4 stars
Q	4/5 stars
The Rolling Stone Album Guide	4.5/5 stars
USA Today	3/4 stars

Jagged Little Pill received generally positive reviews from music critics. Los Angeles Times writer Steve Hochman found that few artists explored "extreme emotional games" as "strikingly" as Morissette, whom he viewed as "a fresh talent—somewhere between, say, Sinéad O'Connor and Liz Phair—who's determined to let her feelings out, whether with a snarl or a smile." Anne Ayers of USA Today said that Morissette "compels with mature, assured songcraft and pointed writing", while Philadelphia Inquirer critic Tom Moon described her as "wise beyond her years, determined to expose the hypocrisy she encounters at every turn." The Village Voice's Robert Christgau wrote that Morissette is "happy to help 15 million girls of many ages stick a basic feminist truth in our faces: privileged phonies have identity problems too. Not to mention man problems." In a retrospective review, Stephen Thomas Erlewine from AllMusic highlighted the intensely personal nature of Morissette's lyrics and found it "remarkable" that the album "struck a sympathetic chord with millions of listeners, because it's so doggedly, determinedly insular." Erlewine concludes, "As slick as the music is, the lyrics are unvarnished and Morissette unflinchingly explores emotions so common, most people would be ashamed to articulate them."

Other critics were less favorable. David Browne of Entertainment Weekly was intrigued by "You Oughta Know" but found the rest of Jagged Little Pill "much harder to swallow", continuing, "What sounds arresting on a single grows wearing over a full album. Producer-co-songwriter Glen Ballard's arrangements are clunky mixtures of alternative mood music and hammy arena rock, and the 21-year-old Morissette tends to wildly oversing every other line." Greg Kot of the Chicago Tribune wrote that Morissette "strives for catharsis but often merely sounds histrionic". In May 1998, Tori Amos commented on the production of the record "I really like her. She's such a good person. I like her as a person a lot. I like the songwriting and I think I like her singing but I've got to tell you, I have a hard time listening to that record, just on a sonic level. It would make a dog's ears hurt. I hate records that have so much high end and no bottom."

When listing the album at 45 on the "100 Best Albums of the Nineties", Rolling Stone commented: "Jagged Little Pill is like a Nineties version of Carole King's Tapestry: a woman using her plain soft-rock voice to sift through the emotional wreckage of her youth, with enough heart and songcraft to make countless listeners feel the earth move". Slant rated it the ninth-best album of 1995. The Independent also included it in the list of 20 best albums of 1995.

== Commercial performance ==
Jagged Little Pill is one of the most successful albums of the 1990s. In the US, it debuted at No. 117 on the Billboard 200 and peaked at No. 1 in October 1995, almost four months after it was released, remaining in that position for twelve weeks in total. It was the first album to reach both 12 million (in February 1997) and 13 million (in August 1998) in sales in the US since 1991, when Nielsen SoundScan started tracking music sales. It was eventually certified 17× Platinum for shipments of 17 million copies. Morissette held the record as the youngest artist—she was 21 at the time—to be certified diamond in the US, until Britney Spears claimed that title with her debut album ...Baby One More Time certified diamond in December 1999 as she turned 18. The album recorded a further 350,000 units sold through BMG Music Club. On the week ending June 21, 2015, the album sold 5,000 copies, bringing its sales to just over 15 million, making it one of only three albums to have sold at least 15 million copies in the United States since Nielsen Music began tracking data in 1991. It also peaked at No. 1 on the Canadian Albums Chart, and was certified 2× Diamond for selling over 2 million copies. It had sold 6 million copies by 1996.

Jagged Little Pill was very successful worldwide. In Oceania, the album debuted at No. 46 in Australia and rose to peak at No. 1, staying there for 10 non-consecutive weeks. It was certified 14× Platinum, selling over 980,000 copies there. The album debuted at No. 46 in New Zealand, then rose to No. 1, staying there for 11 non-consecutive weeks. In Europe, it peaked at No. 6 on the French Albums Chart, staying in the charts for 37 weeks, and was eventually certified Platinum in that country. In Italy, the album has shipped half a million copies. The album debuted at No. 76 in the United Kingdom and later reached No. 1, spending a total of 221 weeks on the charts. The album was certified 10× Platinum, shipping over 3 million copies.

With 18.7 million copies sold globally in 1996, Jagged Little Pill was the best-selling album of that year. It sold 500,000 or more copies during more than 15 non-consecutive weeks. As of 2009, it has sold 33 million copies worldwide.

== Legacy ==
The album received numerous awards and accolades. Morissette and the album won five Juno Awards in 1996: Album of the Year, Single of the Year for "You Oughta Know", Female Vocalist of the Year, Songwriter of the Year and Best Rock Album. At the 1996 Grammy Awards, she won four awards: Best Female Rock Vocal Performance, Best Rock Song (both for "You Oughta Know"), Best Rock Album and Album of the Year; Morissette consequently tied with Carole King and Bonnie Raitt for the record of most Grammys won by a woman at a single ceremony, at the time. Glen Ballard was nominated as Producer of the Year, Non-Classical for the album's production. "Ironic" was nominated for two 1997 Grammy Awards—Record of the Year and Best Music Video, Short Form—and won Single of the Year at the 1997 Juno Awards, where Morissette also won Songwriter of the Year and the International Achievement Award. The video Jagged Little Pill, Live, which was co-directed by Morissette and chronicled the bulk of her tour, won a 1998 Grammy Award for Best Music Video, Long Form.

In 1998, the album was ranked at No. 28 in the Top 100 Albums list of the Music of the Millennium, a nation-wide public survey conducted in the United Kingdom in 1999 by HMV music stores, in partnership with the Channel 4 television network and Classic FM radio. In 2005, Channel 4 included the album at No. 16 in the list 100 Best Albums of All Time.

In 2000, it was voted No. 51 in Colin Larkin's All Time Top 1000 Albums. In October 2002, Rolling Stone ranked it No. 31 on its Women In Rock – The 50 Essential Albums list. In 2003, the magazine ranked it No. 327 on its list of "The 500 Greatest Albums of All Time", and while left out of the 2012 update, the album's rank shot up to number 69 in the 2020 reboot of the list. The album was included in the book 1001 Albums You Must Hear Before You Die. The album also appears on the Rock and Roll Hall of Fame and National Association of Recording Merchandisers' list of "200 Definitive Albums" at No. 26, and on Apple Music's "100 Best Albums" list at No. 31. The album ranked at No. 50 on Rolling Stone's 2012 list of "Women Who Rock: The 50 Greatest Albums of All Time". The album peaked at No. 1 on the US Billboard 200, making Morissette the first Canadian woman to top the chart. It also topped Billboard's "Best Selling Pop album of the 1990s". In 2022, Pitchfork ranked the album at No. 51 in its list of The 150 Best Albums of the 1990s.

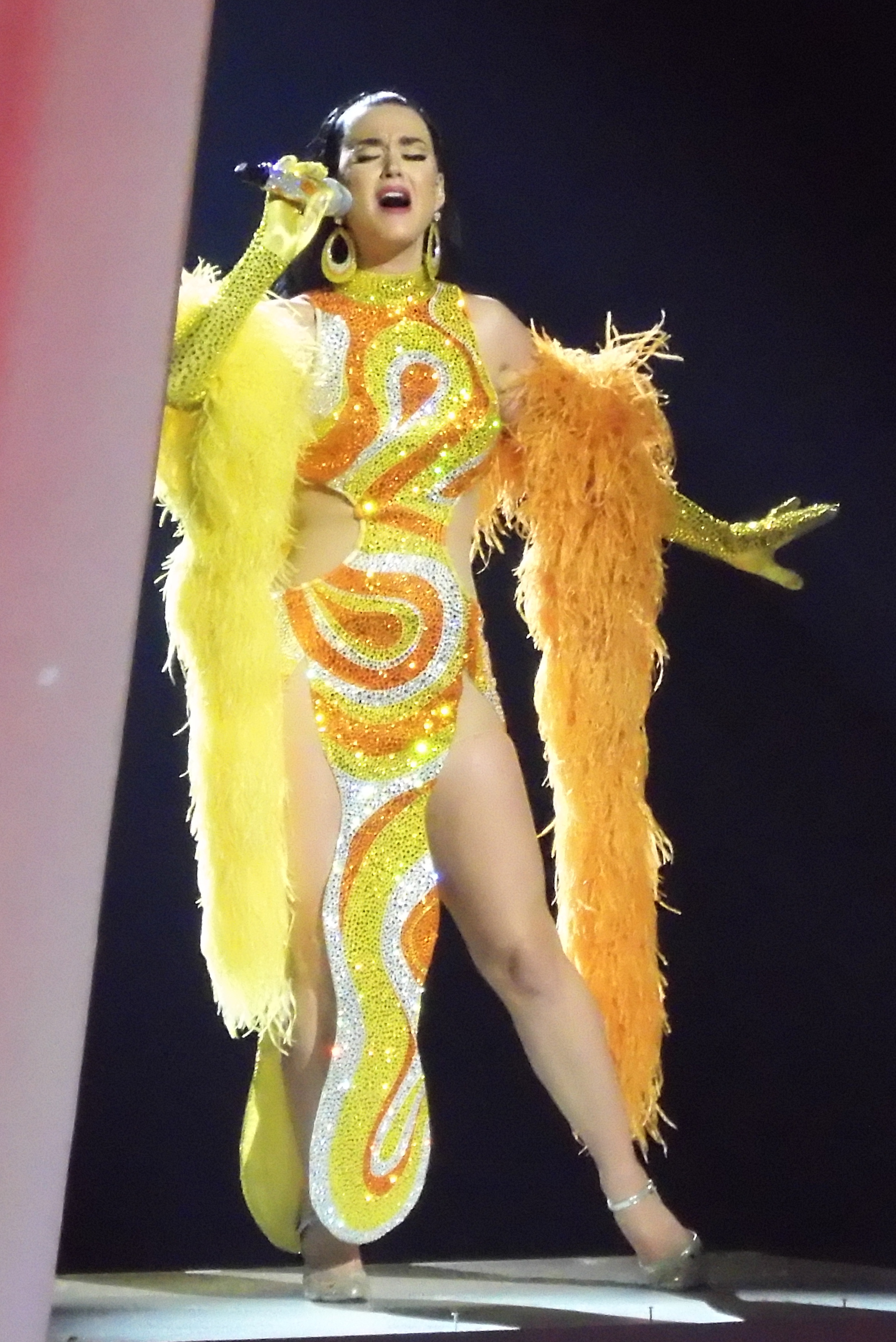
American singer Katy Perry cites Jagged Little Pill as a significant musical inspiration.

Morissette's success with Jagged Little Pill was credited with leading to the introduction of female singers such as Fiona Apple, Shakira, Tracy Bonham, Meredith Brooks, and in the early 2000s, Pink, Michelle Branch, and fellow Canadian Avril Lavigne. American singer Katy Perry cites Jagged Little Pill as a significant musical inspiration, and opted to work with Morissette's frequent collaborator Ballard as a result. Perry stated, "Jagged Little Pill was the most perfect female record ever made. There's a song for anyone on that record; I relate to all those songs. They're still so timeless." Grammy Award winner Kelly Clarkson said of the album, "It made me a better writer. It made me a better singer." Avril Lavigne cited Jagged Little Pill as one of her all-time favorite albums, stating: "It is an album I can revisit over and over, belt every song, and never get sick of." In 2018, the album won the Polaris Heritage Prize Audience Award in the 1986–1995 category. Benny Anderson of ABBA listed the album as one of the 6 soundtracks of his life: "I listened to this a lot when it came out, at a time when I wasn't writing pop songs any more. It was a remembrance of solid golden pop, from a fantastically talented woman with great writing and a great voice, and a very nicely produced album by Glen Ballard. It's one of the top 10 albums in my life when it comes to pop records, alongside Rumours and Hotel California."

In August 2021, Morissette began a tour for the album's 26th anniversary. The tour was scheduled to begin in 2020 for the album's 25th anniversary, but was postponed to summer 2021 due to the COVID-19 pandemic and stretched until 2023. Garbage, Cat Power, Beth Orton, Aimee Mann and Feist were the supporting acts on the tour.

In 2015, for its sixth and final season, American TV series Glee paid tribute to this album, alongside Carole King's Tapestry, in its episode "Jagged Little Tapestry" airing January 16, 2015. Three songs from the album are performed in a mashup with one of the songs from Tapestry: "Hand in My Pocket" is mashed up with "I Feel the Earth Move", "Head Over Feet" with "Will You Love Me Tomorrow?", and "You Learn" with "You've Got a Friend". The episode was watched by 1.98 million viewers and received a 0.7/2 in the adult 18-49 demographic.

For herself, Morissette had hoped that the success of the album would give her a degree of acceptance from other artists in the late grunge movement. However she found that her contemporaries were "all about aloofness and ennui and I am not aloof."

== Stage adaptation ==
In November 2013, it was revealed that a theatre adaption of Jagged Little Pill was being adapted for the stage with Tom Kitt attached to arrange the orchestrations. In May 2017, it was announced that the stage adaption would receive its world premiere in May 2018, 23 years after the album was released.

Jagged Little Pill began a limited run of performances opening May 5, 2018, at the Loeb Drama Center, within the American Repertory Theater in Cambridge, Massachusetts, closing July 15, 2018. Notable casting for the show included Elizabeth Stanley as Mary Jane, Derek Klena as Nick, Lauren Patten as Jo, Sean Allan Krill as Steve and Celia Gooding as Frankie. The show has a book by Diablo Cody, with direction by Diane Paulus, choreography by Sidi Larbi Cherkaoui, set design by Riccardo Hernandez, costume design by Emily Rebholz, lighting design by Justin Townsend, and video design by Finn Ross. Music and lyrics are by Alanis Morissette and Glen Ballard, with musical direction by Bryan Perri, sound design by Jonathan Deans and orchestration by Tom Kitt.

The production opened on Broadway at the Broadhurst Theater on December 5, 2019.

== Track listing ==
All lyrics are written by Alanis Morissette; all music is composed by Alanis Morissette and Glen Ballard.

Jagged Little Pill – Standard edition
No.	Title	Length
1.	"All I Really Want"	4:45
2.	"You Oughta Know"	4:09
3.	"Perfect"	3:08
4.	"Hand in My Pocket"	3:42
5.	"Right through You"	2:56
6.	"Forgiven"	5:00
7.	"You Learn"	4:00
8.	"Head over Feet"	4:27
9.	"Mary Jane"	4:41
10.	"Ironic"	3:50
11.	"Not the Doctor"	3:48
12.	"Wake Up"	4:54
13.	"You Oughta Know" (Jimmy the Saint Blend) / "Your House (a cappella)"	8:13
Total length:		57:23

Note: "You Oughta Know" (Jimmy the Saint Blend) / "Your House (a cappella)" only appears as a hidden track on the CD release and does not appear on the original 1995 vinyl release.

All lyrics are written by Alanis Morissette; all music is composed by Alanis Morissette and Glen Ballard.

Jagged Little Pill – 20th Anniversary Collector's edition
No.	Title	Length
1.	"The Bottom Line"	4:12
2.	"Superstar Wonderful Weirdos"	4:24
3.	"Closer than You Might Believe"	3:36
4.	"No Avalon"	4:22
5.	"Comfort"	4:06
6.	"Gorgeous"	4:03
7.	"King of Intimidation"	3:20
8.	"Death of Cinderella"	3:16
9.	"London"	4:33
10.	"These Are the Thoughts"	3:17
Total length:		39:09

== Personnel ==
The following people contributed to Jagged Little Pill:

Musicians

- Alanis Morissette – vocals (all tracks), harmonica (tracks 1, 4, 8)
- Glen Ballard – guitar (tracks 1, 3, 4, 7–12), keyboards (tracks 1, 4, 6–8, 11, 12), programming (tracks 1, 2, 7, 12)
- Dave Navarro – guitar on "You Oughta Know"
- Basil Fung – guitar (tracks 3, 10)
- Michael Landau – guitar on "Forgiven"
- Joel Shearer – guitar on "Right Through You"
- Lance Morrison – bass guitar (3, 5, 6, 9, 10, 12)
- Flea – bass guitar on "You Oughta Know"
- Michael Thompson – organ (tracks 3, 10)
- Benmont Tench – organ (tracks 2, 5–7, 9, 12)
- Rob Ladd – drums (tracks 3, 10), percussion on "Ironic"
- Matt Laug – drums (tracks 2, 5, 6, 9, 12)
- Gota Yashiki – groove activator on "All I Really Want"

Production

- Glen Ballard – producer, engineering, mixing
- Scott Campbell – mixing
- Ted Blaisdell – additional engineering
- David Schiffman – additional engineering
- Victor McCoy – assistant engineer
- Rich Weingart – assistant engineer
- Chris Fogel – engineering and mixing
- Francis Buckley – additional mixing
- Jolie Levine – production coordination
- Chris Bellman – mastering
- Tom Recchion – art direction, design
- John Patrick Salisbury – photography

== Charts ==
=== Weekly charts ===
Weekly chart performance for Jagged Little Pill
Chart (1995–1996)	Peak position
Australian Albums (ARIA)	1
Austrian Albums (Ö3 Austria)	2
Belgian Albums (Ultratop Flanders)	1
Belgian Albums (Ultratop Wallonia)	2
Canada Top Albums/CDs (RPM)	1
Canadian Albums (Billboard)	7
Danish Albums (Hitlisten)	1
Dutch Albums (Album Top 100)	1
European Albums (Music & Media)	1
Finnish Albums (Suomen virallinen lista)	1
French Albums (SNEP)	6
German Albums (Offizielle Top 100)	3
Hungarian Albums (MAHASZ)	10
Irish Albums (IRMA)	1
Italian Albums (FIMI)	2
New Zealand Albums (RMNZ)	1
Norwegian Albums (VG-lista)	3
Portuguese Albums (AFP)	1
Scottish Albums (Official Charts)	1
Spanish Albums (PROMUSICAE)	3
Swedish Albums (Sverigetopplistan)	1
Swiss Albums (Schweizer Hitparade)	2
UK Albums (Official Charts)	1
US Billboard 200	1

Weekly chart performance for Jagged Little Pill
Chart (2021–2026)	Peak position
Croatian International Albums (HDU)	25
Greek Albums (IFPI)	21
US Top Alternative Albums (Billboard)	25
US Top Rock Albums (Billboard)	43

=== Decade-end charts ===
1990s-end chart performance for Jagged Little Pill
Chart (1990–1999)	Position
UK Albums (OCC)	5
US Billboard 200	1

=== Year-end charts ===
1995 year-end chart performance for Jagged Little Pill
Chart (1995)	Position
Canadian Albums (RPM)	9
UK Albums (OCC)	49
US Billboard 200	14

1996 year-end chart performance for Jagged Little Pill
Chart (1996)	Position
Australian Albums (ARIA)	1
Austrian Albums (Ö3 Austria)	3
Canadian Albums (RPM)	1
Dutch Albums (Album Top 100)	5
European Top 100 Albums (Music & Media)	1
French Albums (SNEP)	13
German Albums (Offizielle Top 100)	2
Italian Albums (FIMI)	2
New Zealand Albums (RMNZ)	1
Norwegian Albums (VG-lista)	6
Spanish Albums (Promusicae)	6
Swedish Albums & Compilations (Sverigetopplistan)	2
Swiss Albums (Schweizer Hitparade)	3
UK Albums (OCC)	1
US Billboard 200	1

1997 year-end chart performance for Jagged Little Pill
Chart (1997)	Position
Australian Albums (ARIA)	26
Belgian Albums (Ultratop Flanders)	74
Canadian Albums (Nielsen Soundscan)	61
Dutch Albums (Album Top 100)	43
European Top 100 Albums (Music & Media)	43
German Albums (Offizielle Top 100)	66
New Zealand Albums (RMNZ)	44
UK Albums (OCC)	46
US Billboard 200	23

1998 year-end chart performance for Jagged Little Pill
Chart (1998)	Position
Danish Albums (Hitlisten)	44
UK Albums (OCC)	106

1999 year-end chart performance for Jagged Little Pill
Chart (1999)	Position
UK Albums (OCC)	164

2000 year-end chart performance for Jagged Little Pill
Chart (2000)	Position
Dutch Albums (Album Top 100)	79
UK Albums (OCC)	117

2002 year-end chart performance for Jagged Little Pill
Chart (2002)	Position
Canadian Alternative Albums (Nielsen SoundScan)	157

== Certifications and sales ==
Certifications and sales figures for Jagged Little Pill
Region	Certification	Certified units/sales
Argentina (CAPIF)	Platinum	60,000^{^}
Australia (ARIA)	14× Platinum	1,020,000
Austria (IFPI Austria)	2× Platinum	100,000^{*}
Belgium (BRMA)	2× Platinum	100,000^{*}
Brazil (Pro-Música Brasil)	2× Platinum	500,000^{*}
Canada (Music Canada)	2× Diamond	2,000,000^{^}
Denmark (IFPI Danmark)	9× Platinum	180,000^{‡}
Finland (Musiikkituottajat)	Platinum	65,860
France (SNEP)	Platinum	300,000^{*}
Germany (BVMI)	2× Platinum	1,000,000^{^}
Iceland	—	7,000
Italy	—	500,000
Mexico	—	500,000
Netherlands (NVPI)	4× Platinum	400,000^{^}
New Zealand (RMNZ)	2× Platinum	30,000^{‡}
Norway (IFPI Norway)	Platinum	75,000
Poland (ZPAV)	Gold	50,000^{*}
Portugal (AFP)	2× Platinum	80,000^{^}
Singapore	—	60,000
Spain (Promusicae)	3× Platinum	300,000^{^}
Sweden (GLF)	2× Platinum	200,000^{^}
Switzerland (IFPI Switzerland)	Platinum	50,000^{^}
United Kingdom (BPI)	10× Platinum	3,000,000^{^}
United States (RIAA)	17× Platinum	17,000,000^{‡}
Summaries
Europe (IFPI)	7× Platinum	7,000,000^{*}
Worldwide	—	33,000,000
^{*} Sales figures based on certification alone.^{^} Shipments figures based on certification alone.^{‡} Sales+streaming figures based on certification alone.

== See also ==
- List of best-selling albums
- List of best-selling albums by women
- List of best-selling albums in Australia
- List of best-selling albums in Canada
- List of best-selling albums in New Zealand
- List of best-selling albums in the United States
- List of best-selling albums in the United Kingdom
