= Head over Feet =

1996 single by Alanis Morissette

- Artwork for European and Australian releases

Single by Alanis Morissette

from the album Jagged Little Pill
- B-side: "You Learn" (live); "Hand In My Pocket" (live); "Right Through You" (live)
- Released: July 22, 1996
- Recorded: 1994–1995
- Length: 4:27
- Label: Maverick; Reprise
- Songwriters: Alanis Morissette; Glen Ballard
- Producer: Glen Ballard

Alanis Morissette singles chronology
"Ironic" (1996)	"Head over Feet" (1996)	"All I Really Want" (1996)

Music video
- "Head over Feet" on YouTube

"Head over Feet" is a song by Canadian singer-songwriter Alanis Morissette, taken from her third (and first outside Canada) studio album Jagged Little Pill (1995). Written by Alanis and Glen Ballard, and produced by Ballard, it was released as the album's fifth single outside of the United States in July 1996 and presented a softer sound than the previous singles from the album. "Head over Feet" talks about being best friends and lovers with someone at the same time, with Alanis thanking them for their manners, love and devotion.

"Head over Feet" received positive response from critics, who described it as soft and light. The song became Morissette's first number-one hit on the US Billboard Adult Top 40 chart and also topped the Top 40/Mainstream chart. In the United Kingdom, it was her first top-10 single, and it reached the top 20 in Australia. In Canada, the song spent eight weeks at number one on the RPM 100 Hit Tracks Chart, the most of any of her four number-one songs from Jagged Little Pill. The single also peaked at number one in Iceland and Israel.

A live version of "Head over Feet" is featured on the album Alanis Unplugged (1999), and an acoustic version of the song was recorded for the album Jagged Little Pill Acoustic (2005). The song is included in the Jagged Little Pill musical and is performed on the show's soundtrack by actors Celia Rose Gooding, Antonio Cipriano, Elizabeth Stanley and Sean Allan Krill. The song is the earliest known use of the term "friend with benefits".

== Writing and composition ==
Alanis Morissette and Glen Ballard wrote "Head over Feet", one of the several tracks they collaborated on for her breakthrough album, Jagged Little Pill (1995). Ballard met Morissette on March 8, 1994, after his publishing company matched them up. According to Ballard, the connection was "instant", and within 30 minutes of meeting each other they had begun experimenting with different sounds in Ballard's home studio in San Fernando Valley, California. Ballard also declared to Rolling Stone that, "I just connected with her as a person, and, almost parenthetically, it was like 'Wow, you're 19?' She was so intelligent and ready to take a chance on doing something that might have no commercial application. Although there was some question about what she wanted to do musically, she knew what she didn't want to do, which was anything that wasn't authentic and from her heart."

"Head over Feet" tells a tale of a couple who are best friends as well as lovers, in which the protagonist thanks a friend for his manners, love and devotion. For Jason Radford of Pop'Stache, "It speaks of love beyond the lines and attraction regardless of inhibitions." Yahoo! Voices's Joanna Lopez wrote that the song "is about realizing you've fallen in love with your best friend." "You are the bearer of unconditional things, you held your breath and the door for me, thanks for your patience," she sings.

The song is the earliest known use of the term "friend with benefits", specifically in the lyric "you're my best friend, best friend with benefits".

Sheet music for "Head over Feet" shows the key of C major (with the chorus in D major) in common time at a tempo of 120 beats per minute, and Morissette's vocals spanning from G_{3} to B_{4}.

== Critical reception ==
"Head over Feet" was released on July 22, 1996, as the album's fifth single. The song received mostly positive response from music critics. Stephen Thomas Erlewine of AllMusic chose it as a standout track on the album. Likewise, Erlewine also picked it as a highlight on her compilation, The Collection (2005). Melissa Minners of G- Pop called it "a pretty song," but admitted she prefers "the angry Alanis." British magazine Music Week rated it four out of five, describing it as "another stormer, with the Canadian's extra-personal vocals rising to a dramatic crescendo. A surefire hit." Jason Radford of Pop'Stache praised the track, writing that it "words itself brilliantly, providing the words that shaped a generation. Its metaphors are young, but mature, simple, but detailed." John Weathered of Sputnikmusic wrote that on 'Head over Feet' "she sound[s] quite sweet, where she goes on about a friend who becomes her lover." Joanna Lopez of Yahoo! Voices simply called it "a great song," praising the music, however feeling "the words are better than the music."

== Chart performance ==
"Head over Feet" was a major commercial success in Canada and the United Kingdom, peaking at number one and seven, respectively. In Canada, the song debuted at number 94 on the RPM 100 Hit Tracks chart and later peaked at number one for eight weeks (the longest reign of the year), becoming her fourth consecutive number-one single from Jagged Little Pill. The song spent 14 weeks in the Top Ten and was the number ten song for 1996, even though its last week at number one and last four weeks in the Top Ten spilled over in 1997. In the United Kingdom, it became the only single from the album to reach the top ten and remains her second most successful single in the UK after "Thank You" which peaked at number five in 1998. In Australia, it was her third most successful single from the album on the ARIA Singles Chart, peaking at number 12, while in New Zealand, it was her least successful, reaching number 27.

In the United States, the song was released as a radio-only single, effectively making the song ineligible to enter the Billboard Hot 100. On the Top 40/Mainstream chart, it was another major radio hit, reaching the number one spot, becoming her third consecutive single to do so. The song reached number three on the Hot 100 Airplay (Radio Songs) and number one on the Adult Top 40, her first single to achieve this. On the Modern Rock Tracks chart, it debuted at number 36 on the issue of September 28, 1996, but only peaked at number 25, the least successful single from Jagged Little Pill.

== Music video ==
The music video for "Head over Feet" was directed by Michele Laurita. The video is simple, showing a close-up of Morissette singing and playing harmonica, and uses a locked-off camera that never changes its field of vision. There are two versions of the video: the "Head" version and the "Feet" version (played in Europe and Asia). The 12th take version ends with Morissette's laughter, while the other version shows her and the band playing with children running and playing the harmonica around them. Both videos are featured on the DVD Jagged Little Pill, Live (1997).

Released in September 1996, the video received heavy rotation on MuchMusic, VH1, MTV and other music video channels. In October, the video was the third most played video on VH1 and the 22nd on MTV. In November, the video was already among the top-20 on the most watched videos list compiled by Billboard Magazine. On the November 23, 1996, issue of Billboard, the video was the most played video on VH1.

== Track listings ==
All live tracks were recorded on March 6, 1996, at Wings Stadium, Kalamazoo, Michigan, unless otherwise noted.

Australian CD and cassette single

1. "Head over Feet" (LP version)
2. "You Learn" (live)
3. "Right Through You" (live)
4. "Hand in My Pocket" (live)

UK and European CD single

1. "Head over Feet" (LP version) – 4:23
2. "You Learn" (live) – 4:18
3. "Hand in My Pocket" (live) – 4:42
4. "Right Through You" (live) – 3:14

UK cassette single

1. "Head over Feet" (LP version) – 4:23
2. "Hand in My Pocket" (live) – 4:42

Japanese mini-album

1. "Head over Feet" (album version)
2. "You Oughta Know" (acoustic—live from the 1996 Grammy Awards)
3. "You Learn" (live version)
4. "Hand in My Pocket" (live version)
5. "Right Through You" (live version)

== Personnel ==
Personnel taken from Jagged Little Pill liner notes.

- Alanis Morissette – vocals, harmonica
- Glen Ballard – guitar, keyboards, production, recording
- Chris Fogel – mixing

== Charts ==
=== Weekly charts ===
Chart (1996–1997)	Peak position
Australia (ARIA)	12
Belgium (Ultratip Bubbling Under Flanders)	10
Canada Top Singles (RPM)	1
Canada Adult Contemporary (RPM)	10
Europe (Eurochart Hot 100)	53
Europe ARR Top 25 (Music & Media)	1
Germany (GfK)	73
Iceland (Íslenski Listinn Topp 40)	1
Ireland (IRMA)	11
Israel (Israeli Singles Chart)	1
Netherlands (Dutch Top 40)	33
Netherlands (Single Top 100)	24
New Zealand (Recorded Music NZ)	27
Scottish Singles Sales (Official Charts)	6
UK Singles (Official Charts)	7
UK Airplay (Music Week)	5
US Radio Songs (Billboard)	3
US Adult Alternative Airplay (Billboard)	11
US Adult Contemporary (Billboard)	27
US Adult Pop Airplay (Billboard)	1
US Alternative Airplay (Billboard)	25
US Pop Airplay (Billboard)	1
US Adult Alternative (Radio & Records)	12
US Alternative (Radio & Records)	27
US CHR/Pop (Radio & Records)	1
US CHR/Rhythmic (Radio & Records)	41
US Hot AC (Radio & Records)	2
US Pop/Alternative (Radio & Records)	1

=== Year-end charts ===
Chart (1996)	Position
Australia (ARIA)	62
Canada Top Singles (RPM)	10
Canada Adult Contemporary (RPM)	79
Iceland (Íslenski Listinn Topp 40)	6
Israel (Israeli Singles Chart)	21
US Hot 100 Airplay (Billboard)	34
US Top 40/Mainstream (Billboard)	38
US Adult Alternative (Radio & Records)	56
US CHR/Pop (Radio & Records)	36
US Hot AC (Radio & Records)	43

Chart (1997)	Position
Canada Adult Contemporary (RPM)	80
US Hot 100 Airplay (Billboard)	28
US Adult Top 40 (Billboard)	19
US Top 40/Mainstream (Billboard)	41
US CHR/Pop (Radio & Records)	47
US Hot AC (Radio & Records)	27

== Certifications ==
Region	Certification	Certified units/sales
Australia (ARIA)	Gold	35,000^{^}
New Zealand (RMNZ)	Gold	15,000^{‡}
United Kingdom (BPI)	Silver	200,000^{‡}
^{^} Shipments figures based on certification alone.^{‡} Sales+streaming figures based on certification alone.

== Release history ==
Region	Date	Format(s)	Label(s)	Ref(s).
United Kingdom	July 22, 1996	CD; cassette	Maverick; Reprise	
Australia	September 16, 1996	CD	Maverick	
Japan	October 10, 1996	CD	Maverick; Reprise	
