= Chris Fogel =

American recording engineer and mix engineer

- Born: Reno, Nevada, U.S.
- Occupations: Recording engineer, mix engineer
- Years active: 1997–present

Chris Fogel is an American recording engineer and mix engineer. He has earned several awards including two Primetime Emmy Awards, two Cinema Audio Society Awards and two Grammy awards.

In addition to recording and mixing the music for hundreds of films and television shows, Fogel recorded and mixed Alanis Morissette’s Jagged Little Pill album, which won 5 Grammy Awards in 1996, including Album of the Year.

== Selected filmography ==
- 2023 – Blue Beetle (score recorded, edited and mixed by)
- 2023 – Oppenheimer (score recorded and mixed by)
- 2023 – Mission: Impossible – Dead Reckoning Part One (score mix engineer)
- 2019-2023 – The Mandalorian (score recording and mixing engineer)
- 2022 – Black Panther: Wakanda Forever (score recording and mixing engineer)
- 2022 – The Gray Man (music mixer)
- 2022 – Severance (music recorded and mixed by)
- 2022 – Obi-Wan Kenobi (music scoring mixer and mixing engineer)
- 2022 – Turning Red (score recorded and mixed by)
- 2021 – Ron's Gone Wrong (score recording engineer)
- 2021 – The King's Man (score mixer)
- 2021 – Eternals (score mixer)
- 2020 – Tenet (music scoring mixer)
- 2018 – Venom (score recorded and mixed by)
- 2018 – Black Panther (score recording and mixing engineer)
- 2017 – The Greatest Showman (music scoring mixer and recording engineer)
- 2016 – Jack Reacher: Never Go Back (score recording and mixing engineer)
- 2015 – Creed (score recording and mixing engineer)
- 2014 – The Fault in Our Stars (score recording and mixing engineer)
- 2013 – The Secret Life of Walter Mitty (score recorded and mixed by)
- 2008 – Tropic Thunder (score recording and mixing engineer)
- 2007 – Superbad (score recording and mixing engineer)
- 2006 – The Devil Wears Prada (score recording and mixing engineer)
- 2005 – The 40-Year-Old Virgin (score recording and mixing engineer)
- 2001 – K-PAX (music scoring mixer)
- 1999 – Cruel Intentions (score recording and mixing engineer)

== Awards and nominations ==
| Year | Result | Award | Category | Work | Ref. |
|---|---|---|---|---|---|
| 2023 | Nominated | Primetime Emmy Awards | Outstanding Sound Mixing for a Comedy or Drama Series (Half-Hour) and Animation | The Mandalorian: Chapter 24: The Return | |
| 2023 | Nominated | Cinema Audio Society Awards | Outstanding Achievement in Sound Mixing for Television Series – One Hour | Severance | |
| 2023 | Nominated | Cinema Audio Society Awards | Outstanding Achievement in Sound Mixing for a Motion Picture – Animated | Turning Red | |
| 2021 | Won | Cinema Audio Society Awards | Outstanding Achievement in Sound Mixing for Television Series – Half Hour | The Mandalorian: Chapter 2: The Child | |
| 2021 | Nominated | Cinema Audio Society Awards | Outstanding Achievement in Sound Mixing for Television Series – Half Hour | The Mandalorian: Chapter 13: The Jedi | |
| 2021 | Nominated | Cinema Audio Society Awards | Outstanding Achievement in Sound Mixing for a Motion Picture – Animated | Trolls World Tour | |
| 2021 | Won | Primetime Emmy Awards | Outstanding Sound Mixing for a Comedy or Drama Series (One-Hour) | The Mandalorian: Chapter 13: The Jedi | |
| 2020 | Won | Primetime Emmy Awards | Outstanding Sound Mixing for a Comedy or Drama Series (Half-Hour) and Animation | The Mandalorian: Chapter 2: The Child | |
| 2019 | Nominated | Cinema Audio Society Awards | Outstanding Achievement in Sound Mixing for a Motion Picture – Live Action | Black Panther | |
| 2019 | Won | Grammy Awards | Best Score Soundtrack for Visual Media | Black Panther | |
| 2018 | Nominated | Grammy Awards | Album of the Year | "Awaken, My Love!" | |
| 2014 | Nominated | Cinema Audio Society Awards | Outstanding Achievement in Sound Mixing for Television Movie or Limited Series | Phil Spector | |
| 2013 | Nominated | Cinema Audio Society Awards | Outstanding Achievement in Sound Mixing for Television Movie or Limited Series | Game Change | |
| 2012 | Won | Cinema Audio Society Awards | Outstanding Achievement in Sound Mixing for Television Movie or Limited Series | Too Big to Fail | |
| 1999 | Nominated | Grammy Awards | Best Engineered Album, Non-Classical | Contact from the Underworld of Redboy | |
