= All I Really Want (Alanis Morissette song) =

1996 single by Alanis Morissette

Single by Alanis Morissette

from the album Jagged Little Pill
- B-side: "Ironic" (live); "Hand in My Pocket" (live)
- Released: November 25, 1996
- Recorded: 1994–early 1995
- Length: 4:44
- Label: Maverick
- Songwriters: Alanis Morissette; Glen Ballard
- Producer: Glen Ballard

Alanis Morissette singles chronology
| "Head over Feet" (1996) | "All I Really Want" (1996) | "Uninvited" (1998) |

"All I Really Want" is a song written by Canadian singer-songwriter Alanis Morissette and Glen Ballard, and produced by Ballard for Morissette's third album, Jagged Little Pill (1995). It was released by Maverick Records as the album's sixth and final single in the United Kingdom in November 1996. It was the last song written for Jagged Little Pill but originated from a song called "The Bottom Line", which was the first song Morissette wrote with Glen Ballard. The single peaked at number 14 on the US Billboard Modern Rock Tracks chart, number 40 on the Australian ARIA Singles Chart, and number 59 on the UK Singles Chart.

== Lyrics ==
Alanis compares herself to Estella from Charles Dickens' novel Great Expectations while having a confrontation with her partner about their uncomfortable relationship.

== Critical reception ==
Helen Lamont from Smash Hits gave "All I Really Want" five out of five and named it Best New Single, writing, "Aww, wow! This is fantastic! This is definitely the strangest Single of the Fortnight — and the best. Alanis growls her way through from start to finish, squealing over a dancebeat and tripping over her words. Her vocals are—uh—distinctive (the closest thing is Dolores from The Cranberries), but when you get past all the gimmicky fancy bits, what you've left with is still a brilliant, original tune. There's not many bands who can do both, because having both makes a top song indeed."

== Music video ==
The song has no official video, but there was a promo video that contained footage from concerts and the videos for "You Oughta Know" and "Hand in My Pocket".

== Track listing ==
1. "All I Really Want" – 4:42
2. "Ironic" (live from Sydney) – 4:34
3. "Hand in My Pocket" (live from Brisbane) – 4:34

== Personnel ==
Personnel are sourced from the Jagged Little Pill liner notes.

- Alanis Morissette – vocals, harmonica
- Glen Ballard – guitar, keyboards, programming
- Gota Yashiki – groove activator

== Charts ==
=== Weekly charts ===
| Chart (1995–1997) | Peak position |
|---|---|
| Australia (ARIA) | 40 |
| Scottish Singles Sales (Official Charts) | 58 |
| UK Singles (Official Charts) | 59 |
| UK Airplay (Music Week) | 19 |
| US Radio Songs (Billboard) | 65 |
| US Alternative Airplay (Billboard) | 14 |
| US Active Rock (Radio & Records) | 31 |
| US Adult Alternative (Radio & Records) | 26 |
| US Alternative (Radio & Records) | 14 |
| US Rock (Radio & Records) | 45 |

=== Year-end charts ===
| Chart (1996) | Position |
|---|---|
| US Modern Rock Tracks (Billboard) | 97 |
