= Hand in My Pocket =

1995 single by Alanis Morissette

- Cover art for UK and European editions of the 1995 single release

Single by Alanis Morissette

from the album Jagged Little Pill
- B-side: "Head over Feet" (live acoustic)
- Released: October 16, 1995
- Recorded: 1994–April 1995
- Length: 3:41
- Label: Maverick; Reprise
- Songwriters: Alanis Morissette; Glen Ballard
- Producer: Glen Ballard

Alanis Morissette singles chronology
"You Learn" (1995)	"Hand in My Pocket" (1995)	"Ironic" (1996)

Music video
- "Hand in My Pocket" on YouTube

"Hand in My Pocket" is a song by Canadian recording artist and songwriter Alanis Morissette from her third studio album, Jagged Little Pill (1995). The song was written by Morissette and Glen Ballard and was released as the album's second single (third in Japan) on October 16, 1995, by Maverick and Reprise Records. The song received generally favorable reviews from music critics, who applauded Morissette's songwriting.

"Hand in My Pocket" also received substantial success through radio airplay in the US. The song became Morissette's second number-one hit on the US Billboard Modern Rock Tracks chart. The song also reached the top 10 in New Zealand and Canada, where it was her first number-one single. An accompanying music video, directed by Mark Kohr, was released for the single, featuring Morissette at a festival, driving her car in black and white form, which also received positive reviews.

== Writing and composition ==
"Hand in My Pocket" was written by Morissette and Glen Ballard. Ballard met Morissette on March 8, 1994, after his publishing company matched them up. According to Ballard, the connection was "instant", and within 30 minutes of meeting each other they had begun experimenting with different sounds in Ballard's home studio in San Fernando Valley, California. Ballard also declared to Rolling Stone that:

I just connected with her as a person, and, almost parenthetically, it was like 'Wow, you're 19?' She was so intelligent and ready to take a chance on doing something that might have no commercial application. Although there was some question about what she wanted to do musically, she knew what she didn't want to do, which was anything that wasn't authentic and from her heart.

The song is a mainstream rock song. The chorus of "Hand in My Pocket" uses a poetry technique, "rhyme juxtaposition", as its primary lyrical structure, as exemplified by the off-set coupling of the first and second stanzas of each chorus. In the first chorus for example, "fine, fine, fine" is coupled with "a high five", when it should, according to traditional rhyming schemes, be instead set against the "a peace sign" which closes the third chorus, and which is in turn, coupled with a first line ending with the phrase, "a cigarette", which is a clear rhyme with the end of the second chorus: "out just yet". Morissette does not carry the scheme consistently throughout the song (there are, for instance, no rhymes for "hailing a taxicab" or "playing the piano").

Sheet music for "Hand in My Pocket" is in the key of G major in common time with a tempo of 92 beats per minute. Morissette's vocals span from G_{3} to C_{5} in the song.

== Critical reception ==
While reviewing Jagged Little Pill, AllMusic dubbed "Hand in My Pocket" an album highlight. Steve Baltin from Cash Box described it as "enticing", noting that it includes "a well-placed harmonica solo from Morissette herself." British magazine Music Week rated the song four out of five, adding, "The second single from the abrasive and rampantly successful Alanis sees her Marianne Faithfull-circa-Wydja Do It attitude coupled with pop metal guitar and loping bass for maximum effect." Mark Sutherland from NME called it "a bite-the-hand assault on slackerdom".

== Chart performance ==
"Hand in My Pocket" peaked at number one in her native Canada, becoming Morissette's first number one single there. The song also peaked at number one on the US Modern Rock Tracks chart, at number four on the US Top 40/Mainstream chart, at number 15 on the Hot 100 Airplay chart, and at number eight on the Album Rock Tracks chart. The song was successful throughout North America although the single was not released as a CD Single. Therefore it was ineligible for the Billboard Hot 100.

Elsewhere, the song debuted at number 49 in Australia and peaked at number 13, staying there for two consecutive weeks. The song debuted at number 39 in New Zealand and peaked at number seven, the only country outside of North America where it reached the top 10. The song had moderate success in Europe, debuting at number 56 in Sweden and peaking at number 45 on the chart. It also peaked at number 39 in France, staying on the chart for five weeks, and number 86 in the Netherlands with five weeks on that chart.

"Hand in My Pocket" received moderate to major success worldwide. In New Zealand, the song peaked at number seven and was certified platinum by Recorded Music NZ (RMNZ), for shipments of 30,000 copies. The song saw some success in the United Kingdom, debuting and peaking at number 26 on the week ending of October 28, 1995. Over the course of the next two weeks, "Hand in My Pocket" fell to number 37 then number 54, spending a total of three weeks on the chart. In 2023, the song was certified gold by the BPI for sales of over 400,000 units in the UK.

== Promotion ==
The single was added in the set list for Morissette's concert tour, Jagged Little Pill World Tour (1995). The song was added to the tour's video album Jagged Little Pill Live (1997). Since then, the song has been included in her albums MTV Unplugged (1999), Feast on Scraps (2002), and The Collection, as well as 1997 Grammys and the MTV Unplugged compilation albums.

== Music video ==
Directed by Mark Kohr and filmed in black-and-white and slow motion, the song's video features Morissette among a homecoming parade. It was filmed in the Windsor Terrace neighborhood of Brooklyn, New York. As well as censoring the song's profanity, the video features extra guitar 'licks' on the lead-up to the bridge.

== Usage in media ==
"Hand in My Pocket" served as the theme song in the unaired pilot episode of the television show Dawson's Creek, but Morissette decided not to have it used as the theme after the show was picked up. In 2015, the song was covered in an episode of season six of the American television series Glee, called "Jagged Little Tapestry", by actresses Naya Rivera and Heather Morris as part of a mashup with Carole King's "I Feel the Earth Move"—Rivera's character Santana sings the song as a prelude to her proposal to Morris's character Brittany. "Hand in My Pocket" featured prominently in the final scene of the third season of Amazon's Transparent, when the character Shelly Pfefferman performs a cabaret version of the song aboard a cruise ship while her family looks on. In 2017, the song was used in the American film Lady Bird.

== Track listings ==
- UK CD1 and Australian CD single
1. "Hand in My Pocket" – 3:37
2. "Head over Feet" (live acoustic) – 4:07
3. "Not the Doctor" (live acoustic) – 3:57
- UK CD2
1. "Hand in My Pocket" – 3:37
2. "Right Through You" (live acoustic) – 3:03
3. "Forgiven" (live acoustic) – 4:23
- UK cassette single
1. "Hand in My Pocket" – 3:37
2. "Head over Feet" (live acoustic) – 4:07
- Japanese CD single
1. "Hand in My Pocket" (album version)
2. "Not the Doctor" (live in Japan)

== Personnel ==
Personnel taken from Jagged Little Pill liner notes.

- Alanis Morissette – vocals, harmonica
- Glen Ballard – guitar, keyboards, production, recording, mixing

== Charts ==
=== Weekly charts ===
Chart (1995–1996)	Peak position
Australia (ARIA)	13
Canada Top Singles (RPM)	1
Canada Adult Contemporary (RPM)	32
Canada Rock/Alternative (RPM)	4
Europe (European Hit Radio)	33
France (SNEP)	39
Iceland (Íslenski Listinn Topp 40)	16
Netherlands (Single Top 100)	86
New Zealand (Recorded Music NZ)	7
Scottish Singles Sales (Official Charts)	23
Sweden (Sverigetopplistan)	45
UK Singles (Official Charts)	26
UK Airplay (Music Week)	17
US Radio Songs (Billboard)	15
US Adult Contemporary (Billboard)	30
US Adult Pop Airplay (Billboard)	25
US Alternative Airplay (Billboard)	1
US Mainstream Rock Airplay (Billboard)	8
US Pop Airplay (Billboard)	4
US Active Rock (Radio & Records)	7
US Adult Alternative (Radio & Records)	2
US Alternative (Radio & Records)	3
US CHR/Pop (Radio & Records)	6
US Hot AC (Radio & Records)	28
US Pop/Alternative (Radio & Records)	2
US Rock (Radio & Records)	5

=== Year-end charts ===
Chart (1995)	Position
Canada Top Singles (RPM)	11
US Hot 100 Airplay (Billboard)	70
US Modern Rock Tracks (Billboard)	16
US Alternative (Radio & Records)	14
US CHR/Pop (Radio & Records)	95
US Rock (Radio & Records)	67

Chart (1996)	Position
Australia (ARIA)	92
Canada Top Singles (RPM)	44
New Zealand (RIANZ)	36
US Mainstream Rock Tracks (Billboard)	98
US Top 40/Mainstream (Billboard)	39
US CHR/Pop (Radio & Records)	53

== Certifications ==
Region	Certification	Certified units/sales
New Zealand (RMNZ)	Platinum	30,000^{‡}
United Kingdom (BPI)	Gold	400,000^{‡}
^{‡} Sales+streaming figures based on certification alone.

== Release history ==
Region	Date	Format(s)	Label(s)	Ref.
United Kingdom	October 16, 1995	CD; cassette	Maverick; Reprise	
United States	October 17, 1995	Contemporary hit radio	Maverick; Reprise	
Australia	October 30, 1995	CD; cassette	Maverick; WEA	
Japan	January 25, 1996	CD	Maverick; Reprise	
