= You Learn =

1995 single by Alanis Morissette

- US and Canadian cover art

Single by Alanis Morissette

from the album Jagged Little Pill
- B-side: "You Oughta Know" (live Grammy version)
- Released: September 25, 1995
- Recorded: June 1994–April 1995
- Genre: Rock
- Length: 4:00
- Label: Maverick; Reprise
- Songwriters: Alanis Morissette; Glen Ballard
- Producer: Glen Ballard

Alanis Morissette singles chronology
"You Oughta Know" (1995)	"You Learn" (1995)	"Hand in My Pocket" (1995)

Music video
- "You Learn" on YouTube

"You Learn" is a song by Canadian singer-songwriter Alanis Morissette from her third studio album, Jagged Little Pill (1995). It was written by Morissette and Glen Ballard, the album's producer. Maverick and Warner Bros. Records released the song as the album's fourth single in North America, the second single in Japan, and the third single in the United Kingdom. The lyrics state that valuable lessons are learned from poor decisions. The album title is taken from this song's line: "Swallow it down (what a jagged little pill)".

"You Learn" was first released in Japan in September 1995 and was issued worldwide throughout the following year, starting with the UK in February. The song received generally positive reviews from most music critics, many highlighting the song as an album standout. It was a commercial success globally, topping the Canadian RPM 100 Hit Tracks chart and entering the top 40 in several other countries. In Canada, it was the most successful single of 1996 according to RPM. A music video was shot for the single, directed by Liz Friedlander, showing Morissette walking through the streets of New York City.

== Background ==
During Morissette's stay in Los Angeles to record "You Learn" and other parts of Jagged Little Pill, she was robbed on an empty street by a man with a gun, after which she developed intense general anxiety and suffered daily panic attacks. She was hospitalized and attended psychotherapy sessions, to no avail. As she later said in interviews, Morissette focused all her inner problems on the soul-baring lyrics of the album, for her health. According to Morissette, Ballard was the first collaborator who encouraged her to express her emotions.

Jagged Little Pill was not an instant success. To promote it, "You Learn" was chosen as the fourth single. Because the CD single includes a live version of "You Oughta Know" from the 1996 Grammy Awards as an A-side, Billboard credited the chart position to "You Learn"/"You Oughta Know". An acoustic version of the song from Morissette's live album Alanis Unplugged (1999) was released as a single in some countries in 2000. Another acoustic version was recorded for the album Jagged Little Pill Acoustic (2005).

== Composition ==
"You Learn" is a mid-tempo self-help rock song, with Morissette giving out advice; "Ditch the fear, open your heart, speak your mind, and when the going gets tough, walk around the house naked."

== Reception ==
=== Critical reception ===
"You Learn" received positive reviews from music critics, with many finding the lyrics' message positive. Stephen Thomas Erlewine, of AllMusic, highlighted it as an album standout, but separately gave the song two and a half of five stars. Larry Flick from Billboard magazine felt "this could easily become Morissette's crowning hit, with its shrewdly R&B-flavoured shuffle beat and sugar-coated guitar scratching—not to mention its instantly hummable, almost anthemic chorus." A reviewer for CultureFusion wrote, of the song, "It highlights the album fairly well, creating a mood of 'pissed but positive.' I guess it could be more 'devil may care' but that's not the point. It's another great track and was well worth the single status. Glad it's still popular!" Music Week gave it four of five, describing it as a "mellower, more mainstream single". John Murphy, of MusicOMH, wrote, "'You Oughta Know' and 'You Learn' have a lightness of touch that nicely balance[s] the darkness of the subject matter.'" A reviewer for PopStasche wrote "After 'Right [t]hrough You' and 'Forgiven' display the vocal talent at hand, we're graced with the wonder of 'You Learn.' It provides a break from the fiery frustration yet still proves to have soul through its repetition and humility. There it goes again with its iconic beauty and all."

=== Chart performance ===
"You Learn" was a worldwide success. The song was the album's third single to reach number one in Canada and peaked at number six on the Billboard Hot 100, charting high from strong airplay following "Ironic". It reached number one on the US Pop Songs chart and number seven on the US Modern Rock Tracks chart.

The song had debuted at number twenty-four on the UK Singles Chart and then fell to thirty-two. It started at number thirty-two on the Australian Singles Chart, and peaked at number twenty after five weeks, and stayed in the charts for twelve weeks in total. The song debuted at number thirteen on the New Zealand Singles Chart.

== Music video ==
There were two music videos produced for the single. The original music video, directed by Liz Friedlander, starts with Morissette, hair in twists, handstanding in her apartment. She puts on a white sports jacket, leaves the apartment by the fire escape, and carelessly crosses the street, causing a multi-car accident and an ensuing riot. Morissette ignores the riot, walking on top of the cars that get in her way. After passing by a fire truck, Morissette arrives at an indoor basketball arena on a horse where she, now in a red jacket, successfully throws a ball passed to her into the basket. Morissette then exits the arena to the street and performs backflips through it. By the time she finishes, she is wearing a grey jacket. She randomly kisses a man on the same street and runs to an unfinished bridge, now wearing a green jacket. She jumps from the ledge, lands wearing a blue jacket, and soon engages in a pie fight with a group of people, including her touring drummer Taylor Hawkins. Finally, Morissette emerges in a boxing ring wearing a black jacket and boxing gloves and faces off with a woman in complete boxing gear. The woman punches her in the face, knocking Morissette to the mat. Morissette staggers to her feet, wobbly exits the ring and walks out of the gym as the video ends.

The video was shot in New York City's Meatpacking District. Filming took 23 hours in 10° weather. It features the Twin Towers in a scene where Morissette does tumbling. Morissette also is never seen singing throughout the duration of the clip.

The second music video features Morissette with her band during a live performance. Some clips include her performing from the MTV Unplugged video. The live version was used instead of the album version.

== Live performances and other versions ==
"You Learn" was performed at her worldwide tour Jagged Little Pill Tour. It was performed at her Junkie Tour and the Australian leg as well. It was performed at her Under Rug Swept tour and her Flavors of Entanglement Tour. An acoustic version was featured for the single on her 2005 Jagged Little Pill Acoustic album. An instrumental version also leaked online.

Because the CD single includes a live version of "You Oughta Know" from the 1996 Grammy Awards as an A-side, Billboard credited the chart position to "You Learn"/"You Oughta Know".

== MTV Unplugged version ==
"You Learn (MTV Unplugged)"

Single by Alanis Morissette

from the album MTV Unplugged
- B-side: "Thank U (MTV Unplugged)"
- Released: 1999 (France and Europe)
- Recorded: September 18, 1999
- Length: 4:22
- Label: Maverick; Reprise
- Songwriters: Alanis Morissette; Glen Ballard
- Producer: Alanis Morissette

Alanis Morissette singles chronology
"That I Would Be Good" (1999)	"You Learn (MTV Unplugged)" (1999)	"King of Pain" (2000)

An acoustic version of the song appeared as the first track on Morissette's live album MTV Unplugged (1999) and was released as the second single, only in France and Europe, later that year.

Entertainment Weekly's Beth Johnson, in a review of the album, described the track as "rich", while Robert Christgau highlighted it in his review of the album.

== Covers ==
The Bacon Brothers covered "You Learn" on their 2014 release, 36 Cents.

The American TV series Glee used this song in a mashup with Carole King's You've Got a Friend for the season six episode "Jagged Little Tapestry", a tribute to King's album Tapestry and Morisette's Jagged Little Pill. It was performed by Rachel Berry (Lea Michele), Santana Lopez (Naya Rivera), Brittany Pierce (Heather Morris), Tina Cohen-Chang (Jenna Ushkowitz), Quinn Fabray (Dianna Agron), and Kurt Hummel (Chris Colfer) with their alma mater high school's glee club.

On July 15, 2011, during the Canadian leg of her Speak Now World Tour, American singer Taylor Swift covered "You Learn" as part of an acoustic medley alongside Justin Bieber's "Baby" and Tal Bachman's She's So High.

== Track listings ==
"Your House" was recorded at Ebisu Garden Hall on November 4, 1995. "Wake Up" was recorded in Los Angeles on November 12, 1995.

- US CD, 7-inch, and cassette single
1. "You Learn" (album version) – 3:58
2. "You Oughta Know" (live Grammy version) – 3:48
- UK, European, and Australian CD single
1. "You Learn" (album version) – 4:42
2. "Your House" (live in Tokyo) – 3:03
3. "Wake Up" (Modern Rock Live) – 5:07
4. "Hand in My Pocket" (album version) – 3:37
- UK and Australian cassette single
1. "You Learn" (album version) – 4:42
2. "Your House" (live in Tokyo) – 3:03
- Japanese CD single
1. "You Learn" (album version)
2. "You Learn" (acoustic version)
3. "You Oughta Know" (The Jimmy the Saint Blend / clean version)

== Personnel ==
Personnel taken from Jagged Little Pill liner notes.

Musicians

- Alanis Morissette – vocals
- Glen Ballard – guitar, keyboards, programming
- Benmont Tench – organ

Technical personnel

- Glen Ballard – production
- Chris Fogel – recording, mixing

== Charts ==
=== Weekly charts ===
Chart (1996)	Peak position
Australia (ARIA)	20
Canada Top Singles (RPM)	1
Canada Adult Contemporary (RPM)	12
Canada Rock/Alternative (RPM)	2
Iceland (Íslenski Listinn Topp 40)	2
Israel (Israeli Singles Chart)	1
Netherlands (Single Top 100 Tipparade)	5
New Zealand (Recorded Music NZ)	13
Scottish Singles Sales (Official Charts)	23
UK Singles (Official Charts)	24
UK Airplay (Music Week)	11
US Billboard Hot 100 with "You Oughta Know"	6
US Adult Alternative Airplay (Billboard)	2
US Adult Contemporary (Billboard)	23
US Adult Pop Airplay (Billboard)	3
US Alternative Airplay (Billboard)	7
US Mainstream Rock Airplay (Billboard)	40
US Pop Airplay (Billboard)	1
US Rhythmic Airplay (Billboard)	32
US Cash Box Top 100	2
US Active Rock (Radio & Records)	47
US Adult Alternative (Radio & Records)	2
US Adult Contemporary (Radio & Records)	28
US Alternative (Radio & Records)	5
US CHR/Pop (Radio & Records)	1
US CHR/Rhythmic (Radio & Records)	37
US Hot AC (Radio & Records)	3
US Pop/Alternative (Radio & Records)	1
US Rock (Radio & Records)	29

=== Year-end charts ===
Chart (1996)	Position
Canada Top Singles (RPM)	1
Canada Adult Contemporary (RPM)	88
Canada Rock/Alternative (RPM)	47
Iceland (Íslenski Listinn Topp 40)	48
Israel (Israeli Singles Chart)	22
US Billboard Hot 100	29
US Adult Top 40 (Billboard)	10
US Modern Rock Tracks (Billboard)	49
US Top 40/Mainstream (Billboard)	3
US Top 40/Rhythm-Crossover (Billboard)	87
US Triple-A (Billboard)	30
US Adult Alternative (Radio & Records)	23
US Alternative (Radio & Records)	43
US CHR/Pop (Radio & Records)	7
US Hot AC (Radio & Records)	11

=== Decade-end charts ===
Chart (1990–1999)	Position
Canada (Nielsen SoundScan)	61

== Certifications ==
Region	Certification	Certified units/sales
New Zealand (RMNZ)	Gold	15,000^{‡}
United Kingdom (BPI)	Silver	200,000^{‡}
^{‡} Sales+streaming figures based on certification alone.

== Release history ==
Region	Date	Format(s)	Label(s)	Ref.
Japan	September 25, 1995	CD	Maverick; Reprise; WEA Japan	
United Kingdom	February 12, 1996	CD; cassette	Maverick; Reprise	
United States	July 9, 1996	7-inch vinyl; CD; cassette	Maverick; Reprise	
