= Day of Absence =

Play by Douglas Turner Ward

- Written by: Douglas Turner Ward
- Characters: Clem; Luke; John; Mary; Mayor; Jackson; Others
- Original language: English
- Genre: Satire
- Setting: A Southern town, the present

Premiere
- Date premiered: November 15, 1965
- Place premiered: St. Mark's Playhouse, New York City

Day of Absence is a play written by American playwright Douglas Turner Ward, which premiered off-off-Broadway in 1965. Telling the story of a Southern town where all of its Black residents suddenly disappear, Day of Absence is notable for most productions starring Black actors in whiteface in a reverse minstrel show style. Day of Absence explores themes of whiteness and discrimination against Black Americans through its insertion of Black actors into farcical situations inhabiting white bodies.

Day of Absence, a one act show, is often paired with other Ward plays. In its debut, Day of Absence was paired with Happy Ending, while it was performed alongside Brotherhood in a 1970 production.

Ward, a leading figure in late 20th century Black theatre, was praised for his writing, winning a Drama Desk Award for playwriting in Day of Absence and an Obie Award for his performance as the Mayor in 1965 and 1966, respectively.

== Background ==
While working as an actor, Ward began writing plays, one of which he showed to his friend Robert Hooks, which became Day of Absence. Hooks, who performed in the 1965 production as John, was brought on by Ward to produce the show.

== Productions ==
Day of Absence premiered on off-off-Broadway alongside Happy Ending at St. Mark's Playhouse in New York City on November 15, 1965. It ran for 504 total performances, closing on January 29, 1967. Directed by Philip Meister, this production starred Lonne Elder as Clem, Arthur French as Luke, Robert Hooks as John, Barbara Ann Teer as Mary, Douglas Turner as the Mayor, and Adolph Caesar as Jackson. Ward, performing under the stage name of Douglas Turner, performed in his own play in this production.

A revival production was mounted on March 10, 1970 at St. Mark's Playhouse alongside Brotherhood, another Ward play. It ran for 64 performances, closing on May 3, 1970. Directed by the playwright, Ward, this production starred Frances Foster, Tiffany Hendry, William Jay, and Tom Rosqui.

An off-off-Broadway standalone revival was opened at Theater 80 in New York City on December 4, 2016. It ran for only 7 days, closing on December 11, 2016. Directed by Arthur French, an actor who starred in previous productions, this production starred, Charles Weldon, CeCee Antoinette, Norman Bush, and others.

Day of Absence is an often performed and revived play, from community and school productions to off-Broadway and off-off-Broadway productions in New York City.

== Characters ==
- Clem, a “country cracker.” A white man who bookends the play in conversation with Luke.
- Luke, another “country cracker.” He speaks with Clem about the disappearance of Black residents.
- John, a working white man, and husband to Mary. In the wake of the disappearance of Black residents, he is filled with rage.
- Mary, wife to John. With the disappearance of Lula, her Black companion and caretaker, she is unable to care for her infant child.
- Mayor, the bombastic mayor of the town. He constantly looks for new solutions to his town's problem.
- Jackson, the assistant to the mayor. He is a constant bearer of bad news for the mayor.

== Plot ==
The play begins with Clem and Luke, two white men, in the early morning sitting outside a store. They begin their conversation discussing their families and careers, but Clem more and more forcefully a belief that something isn't right. Eventually, Luke agrees.

Attention then shifts to John and Mary, a married couple, as they wake up to the sound of their crying baby. Irked that the baby's Black caretaker, Lula, has not silenced the baby or shown up to their house at all, John angrily commands Mary to care for the baby, which Mary refuses. They then attempt to call Lula, but all of the lines are extremely busy, with similar situations likely happening all over town.

Clem realizes, too, that he has not seen any of the town's Black residents so far that day, and argues that they have all gone away. While Luke is skeptical of Clem's certainty, the duo decide to look around for Black residents.

John and Mary, now up from bed and preparing for the day, argue over their still crying baby and each of their roles in their marriage. John leaves for work while lambasting Mary for failing to make him breakfast and silence the baby.

After a blackout, attention shifts to the mayor's office where the mayor, along with his assistant Jackson, comes to grips with the disappearance of all the Black residents of his town. He resolves to find all of the Black residents by all means necessary, vowing to “dig ‘em out of the ground” if need be.

In a more emotional scene, Mary reflects on her relationship with Lula, in which she cries over her perceived dependence on her. John consoles her.

In a meeting with town businessmen and representatives, the mayor learns that most functions of the town have come to a standstill as a result of the lack of Black laborers. Additional reports alert the mayor that all Black patients in the hospital are in unexplained comas and that the sheriff can not confirm whether Black inmates in the jail are present.

A television broadcast announcer interviews a series of townspeople on their thoughts regarding the situation in town. First, the announcer speaks with Mr. Council Clan, a parody of a Ku Klux Klan member, who blames the disappearance on the government, and while wanting the expulsion of Black residents, believes that it is not the right time to do such. Next, the announcer interviews Mrs. Handy Anna Aide, the Social Welfare Commissioner. Aide describes the stress that has been placed on white workers and her perceived laziness of Black workers. The announcer then interviews a religious official, Reverend Reb Pious, who accuses the Black residents of the town of immorally utilizing “voodoo” spells to disappear. Finally, the announcer speaks with the mayor, who projects confidence in his plan to find the town's Black residents. He claims that the other Southern towns are sending Black people to work in the town, that the President of the United States and the National Guard are providing support, and that the town is working with the NAACP in order to find the town's Black residents.

Jackson arrives, however, to inform the mayor that most of his claimed sources of aid have fallen through, that there have been multiple threats on his life, and that the city will promptly descend into anarchy in one hour. The mayor, increasingly desperate, becomes convinced that if he delivers a nationally broadcast speech addressed to his town's Black residents, they will certainly return.

The mayor gives his speech, in which he alternates between cheerful anecdotes about his relationship with Black caregivers to vowing punishment on the disappeared Black residents. He concludes by groveling on his knees, begging for the return of the Black residents.

After a prolonged blackout with chaos being simulated, which eventually comes to a quiet halt, the announcer reveals that the mayor was severely beaten by a mob, which almost led to his death. Afterwards, the town comes to a submissive halt.

The next morning, Clem and Luke, in a dazed state, see a Black man, Rastus, whom they thoroughly question. Rastus cannot recall where he was the past day, not knowing that the day had even passed. Luke claims that all has returned to normal, while Clem asks “is it?”

== Reception ==
Reviews for the original production were generally positive. Howard Taubman, writing for The New York Times, praised Ward for his “sardonic" comedy, but criticized the writing for failing to “sustain a strong dramatic line.” Overall, however, Taubman felt that Ward was on the “right track.”

The 2016 off-off-Broadway revival received more muted praise. Alexis Soloski, writing for The New York Times, noted that some actors had not completely committed their lines to memory, but that “the presence” of the show itself was enough for many.

== Legacy ==
After the premiere of Day of Absence, Ward published an article in The New York Times articulating the need for more Black theatre in the United States. After being noticed by the Ford Foundation, Ward, Hooks, and producer Gerald Krone received a $1.2 million grant to found the Negro Ensemble Company (NEC). The NEC, founded in 1967 under their stewardship, became a preeminent theatre company for Black theatre. Ward has stressed his desire to showcase the wide breadth of Black theatre, moving beyond himself and other especially visible Black playwrights like, as he says, August Wilson.

The term “Day of Absence” has been used by people of color in the United States to title organized walk-outs and race based discussion outside of workplaces, notably by students, faculty, and staff of color at Evergreen State College in Olympia, Washington. Further, a walk-out organized by the Milwaukee Bucks of a game against the Orlando Magic in the 2020 NBA Playoffs as a part of the Jacob Blake protests has been linked to Ward's Day of Absence. Subsequent walk-out and game cancellations from major North American sports leagues followed in the same spirit as the action from the Bucks.

== Awards ==
Year	Award ceremony	Category	Nominee	Nominated work	Result
1965	Drama Desk Award	Drama Desk Award for Best Playwright	Douglas Turner Ward	Day of Absence	Won
1966	Obie Award	Obie Award for Distinguished Performance	Douglas Turner Ward	Day of Absence	Won
