= Robert Hooks =

American actor (born 1937)

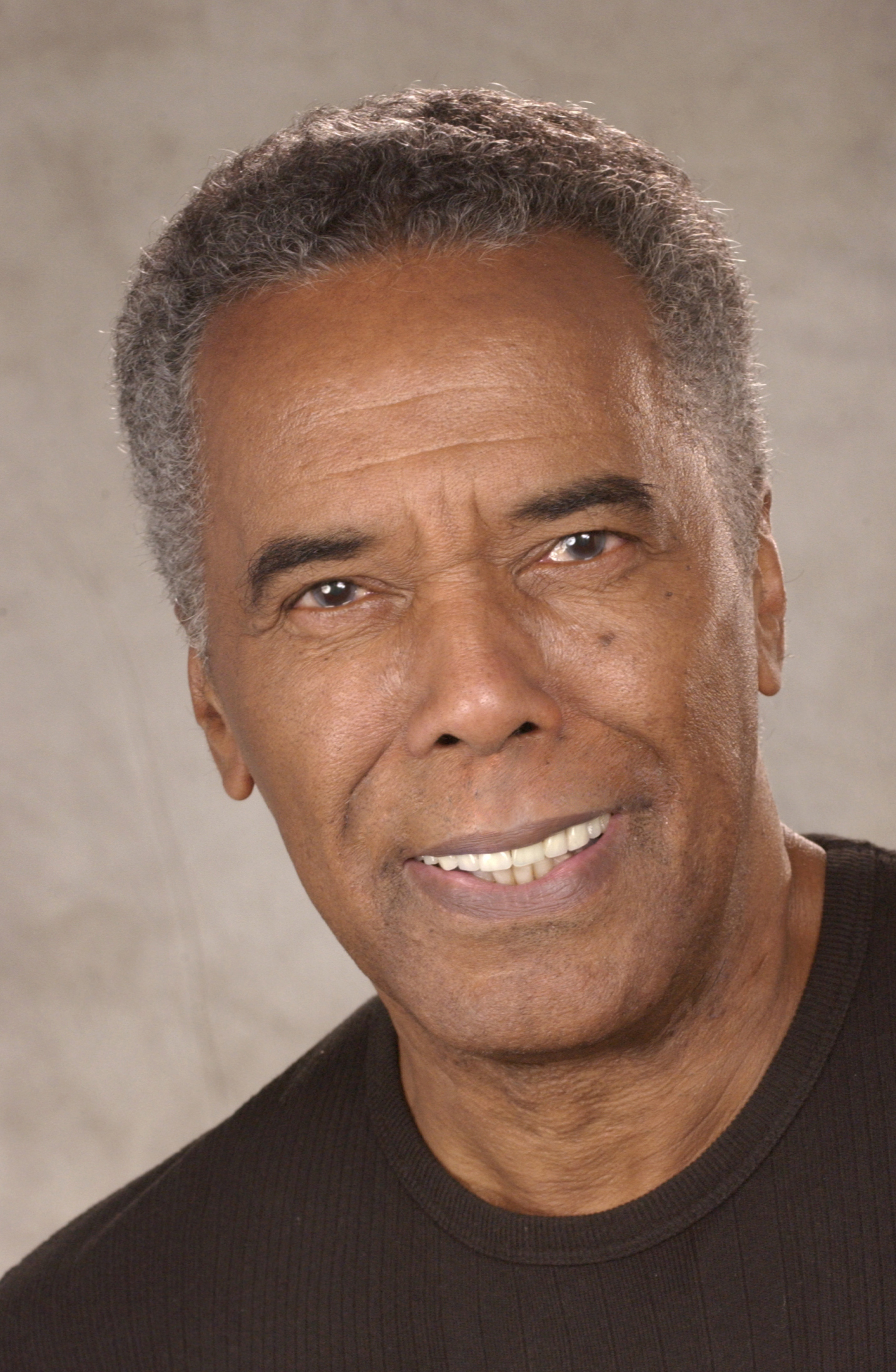
- Hooks in 2005
- Born: Bobby Dean Hooks; April 18, 1937 (age 89); Washington, D.C., United States
- Occupations: Actor; producer; activist
- Years active: 1960–present
- Political party: Democratic
- Spouse: Lorrie Marlow (aka LorrieGay Marlow) (m. 2008)
- Children: Kevin Hooks, Eric Hooks, Cecelia Onibudo, Christopher Carter (né Hooks), Kiyo Tarpley, Robert (Rob) Hooks, Jr., Shelly Wulff née Michelle Thomas
- Parent(s): Mae Bertha "Bert" Ward Hooks (9/27/11 – 12/27/78); Edward Hooks (d. 1939)
- Website: Robert Hooks; Robert Hooks – Cultural Architect Facebook

Robert Hooks (born Bobby Dean Hooks; April 18, 1937) is an American actor, producer, and activist. Along with Douglas Turner Ward and Gerald S. Krone, he founded The Negro Ensemble Company. The Negro Ensemble Company is credited with the launch of the careers of many major black artists of all disciplines, while creating a body of performance literature over the last thirty years, providing the backbone of African-American theatrical classics. Additionally, Hooks is the sole founder of two significant black theatre companies: the D.C. Black Repertory Company, and New York's Group Theatre Workshop.

== Biography ==
=== Early life ===
The youngest of five children, Hooks was born in Foggy Bottom, Washington, D.C., to Mae Bertha (née Ward), a seamstress, and Edward Hooks, who had moved from Rocky Mount, North Carolina, with their four other children, Bernice, Caroleigh, Charles Edward "Charlie", and James Walter "Jimmy". Named Bobby Dean Hooks at birth, Robert was their first child born in Washington, D.C., and the first to be born in a hospital. His father, Edward, died in a work accident on the railroad in 1939.

Hooks attended Stevens Elementary School. In 1945, at the insistence of his sister Bernice who was doing community arts outreach for youngsters at Francis Junior High School, he performed the lead in his first play, The Pirates of Penzance, at the age of nine. From the ages of six to 12, Bobby Dean journeyed with his siblings to Lucama, North Carolina, to work the tobacco fields for his uncle's sharecropping farm as a way to help earn money for the coming school year in D.C.

In 1954, just as Brown vs. Board of Education was being implemented in the north, Hooks moved to Philadelphia to be with his mother, her second husband, and his half-siblings, Safia Abdullah (née Sharon Dickerson), George E. Dickerson, Charles Dickerson, Annette Dickerson, Margie Dickerson, Robert Dickerson. Hooks experienced his first integrated school experience at West Philadelphia High School. Hooks soon joined the drama club and began acting in plays by William Shakespeare and Samuel Beckett. Hooks graduated in 1956, passing on a scholarship to Temple University in order to pursue a career as a stage actor at the Bessie V. Hicks School of Theatre (alongside Charles Dierkop and Bruce Dern, with whom he second-acted plays doing their pre-Broadway tryouts in Philadelphia), while working at Browning King, a men's tailor shop at Fourteenth and Chestnut Streets.

== Acting career ==
Having trained at the Bessie V. Hicks School of Theatre in Philadelphia, and after seeing A Raisin in the Sun in its Philadelphia tryout in February 1959, Hooks moved to New York to pursue acting. In April 1960, as Bobby Dean Hooks, he made his Broadway debut in A Raisin in the Sun, replacing Louis Gossett Jr., who would be doing the film version. Hooks then continued to do its national tour. He then stepped into the Broadway production of A Taste of Honey, replacing Billy Dee Williams; then repeating the same national tour trajectory as he had done for "Raisin..." the previous year.

In early 1962, he next appeared as the lead in Jean Genet's The Blacks, replacing James Earl Jones as the male lead, leaving briefly that same year to appear on Broadway again in Tiger, Tiger Burning Bright, before stepping back into the lead role in The Blacks in 1963. He then returned to Broadway, first in Ballad for Bimshire and then in the short-lived 1964 David Merrick revival of The Milk Train Doesn't Stop Here Any More (as a character created by Tennessee Williams for this revival) and starring Tallulah Bankhead and Tab Hunter in his only stage performance. Immediately thereafter, on March 24, 1964, he originated the role of Clay in Amiri Baraka's Dutchman. With this play, on the advice of Roscoe Lee Brown, Hooks became known as, Robert Hooks. He also originated roles on the New York stage in Where's Daddy? for which he won the Theatre World Award and he was nominated for Best Male Lead in a Musical for Hallelujah Baby while he was simultaneously starring in David Susskind's N.Y.P.D.—the second African-American lead on a television drama, following Bill Cosby on “I Spy”.

In 1968, Hooks was the host of the new public affairs television program Like It Is.

Hooks was nominated for a Tony for his lead role in the musical Hallelujah, Baby!, has received both the Pioneer Award and the NAACP Image Award for Lifetime Achievement, and has been inducted into the Black Filmmakers Hall of Fame. He also won an Emmy for his PBS special Voices of Our People.

Significant roles for which Hooks is known include Reeve Scott in Hurry Sundown (1967), Mr. T. in the blaxploitation film Trouble Man (1972), grandpa Gene Donovan in the comedy Seventeen Again (2000), and Fleet Admiral Morrow in Star Trek III: The Search for Spock (1984). He also appeared on television in an episode of the NBC crime drama series The Eddie Capra Mysteries in 1978, and portrayed Doctor Walcott in the 1980s television series Dynasty.

== Activism ==
=== Arts and culture ===
In 1964, as a result of a speaking engagement at the Chelsea Civil Rights Committee (then connected to the Hudson Guild Settlement House), Hooks founded The Group Theatre Workshop, a tuition-free environment for disadvantaged urban teens who expressed a desire to explore acting. Among the instructors were Barbara Ann Teer, Frances Foster, Hal DeWindt, Lonne Elder III, and Ronnie Mack. Alumni include Antonio Fargas, Hattie Winston, and Daphne Maxwell Reid.

The Group Theatre Workshop was folded into the tuition-free training arm of the Negro Ensemble Company, founded in 1967 with Douglas Turner Ward and Gerald S. Krone, with a $1.3 million grant from the Ford Foundation under the auspices of W. McNeil Lowry.

From 1969 to 1972, Hooks served as an original board member of Black Academy of Arts and Letters, located in New York, alongside C. Eric Lincoln, President; John O. Killens, Alvin F. Poussaint, and Charles White. Chartered by the State of New York, its mission was to bring together black artists and scholars from around the world. Additional members included Julian Adderley, Alvin Ailey, Margaret Walker, James Baldwin, Imamu Baraka, Romare Bearden, Harry Belafonte, Lerone Bennett, Arna Bontemps, Ossie Davis, Ruby Dee Davis, St. Clair Drake, Ernest Dunbar, Katherine Dunham, Lonne Elder III, Duke Ellington, Alex Haley, Ruth Inge Hardison, Vertis Hayes, Chester Himes, Lena Horne, Jacob Lawrence, Elma Lewis, Henry Lewis, Paule Marshall, Donald McKayle, Arthur Mitchell, Frederick O’Neal, Gordon Parks, Sidney Poitier, Benjamin Quarles, Lloyd Richards, Lucille D. Roberts, and Nina Simone.

In response to his hometown 1968 Washington, D.C., riots, in the wake of the assassination of Martin Luther King Jr., and aided by a small grant from the Eugene and Agnes E. Meyer Foundation, Hooks took a leave of absence from the Negro Ensemble Company to create The D.C. Black Repertory Company (1970–1981). The company was intended as a further exploration of the ability of the arts to create healing. The a capella group Sweet Honey in the Rock was created and developed within its workshop process.

The Inner Voices (Lorton Prison arts training program, 1971) proved to be a result of the beneficial effect of the repertory company in the D.C. area. In response to a direct plea from an inmate, Rhozier "Roach" Brown, who was serving a life sentence in Lorton, Hooks' D.C. Black Repertory Company structured the first prison-based arts program in the United States. While it is the norm now, it was then a revolutionary attempt at rehabilitation through the arts. Eventually The Inner Voices performed more than 500 times in other prisons, including a Christmas special entitled, "Holidays, Hollowdays." Due to Roach's work, President Gerald Ford commuted his sentence on Christmas Day, 1975.

His relocation to the West Coast redirected Hooks' approach to parity in the arts with his involvement with The Bay Area Multicultural Arts Initiative (1988) as a board member and grant facilitator-judge. Funded by monies from a unique coalition made up of the San Francisco Foundation (a community foundation); Grants for the Arts of the San Francisco Hotel Tax Fund, and The National Endowment for the Arts, the function of this organization was the funding of deserving local multicultural arts organizations.

In 1992, Hooks co-founded (with writer Lonne Elder III) Arts in Action. Located in South Central Los Angeles, this was a film and television training center established to guide individuals who aspired to careers in film production. It formulated strategies and training for securing entry-level jobs. Courses included: career development workshops; pre-production and production for film and television; creative problem solving in production management; directing for stage and screen—principles and practices; also the craft of assistant directors, script supervisor, technicians, wardrobe, make-up, etc.

The Negro Ensemble Company of Los Angeles (1994–1997) was created because so many New York members and original members had relocated to the West Coast. Hooks, as founder and executive director, asked Denise Nicholas, Denzel Washington, James Earl Jones, Laurence Fishburne, Richard Roundtree, Samuel L. Jackson, all alumni from New York Negro Ensemble Company, to serve as board members. The goal of the Negro Ensemble Company of Los Angeles was to be a new and innovative multi-ethnic cultural project that strived to achieve the community effectiveness and professional success of its parent organization.

== Personal life ==
Hooks is the father of actor, television and film director Kevin Hooks. He married Lorrie Gay Marlow (actress, author, artist) on June 15, 2008. Previously, he was married to Yvonne Hickman and Rosie Lee Hooks.

In 2021, Emory University began adding to its official archives material documenting Hooks' career, including scripts, printed material, contracts and financial records, notes, correspondence, writings, books and periodicals, audiovisual and digital files.

== Awards ==
- 1966 – Theatre World Award (1965–66) for Where's Daddy? (The Billy Rose Theatre)
- 1979 – American Black Achievement Award – Ebony magazine
- 1982 – Emmy Award for Producing (1982), Voices of Our People: In Celebration of Black Poetry (KCET-TV/PBS)
- 1966 – Tony Nomination, Lead Role in a Musical for Hallelujah, Baby
- 1985 – Inducted into The Black Filmmakers Hall of Fame, recipient Oscar Micheaux Award (1985)
- 1986 – March 2 declared Robert Hooks Day by the City of Los Angeles, Mayor Tom Bradley
- 1987 – Excellence in Advertising and Communications to Black Communities from CEBA (Excellence in Advertising and Communications to Black Communities)
- 2000 – Honorary Doctor of Humane Letters, Honoris Causa honorary degree, Bowie State University
- 2000 – May 25 declared Robert Hooks Day in Washington, D.C.
- 2005 – Beverly Hills/Hollywood Chapter NAACP Image Award for Lifetime Achievement
- 2005 – Beverly Hills/Hollywood Chapter NAACP Trailblazer Award to the Negro Ensemble Company
- 2005 – Trailblazer Award – City of Los Angeles
- 2006 – The Black Academy of Arts and Letters (TBAAL), Lifetime Achievement Award (Dallas)
- 2007 – The Black Theatre Alliance Awards / Lifetime Achievement Award
- 2015 – Living Legend Award (2015) National Black Theatre Festival
- 2018 – October 18 proclaimed Robert Hooks Day by Mayor Muriel Bowser, Washington, D.C.
- 2018 – Hooks is entered into The Congressional Record by the Hon. Eleanor Holmes Norton, September 4, 2018, Vol. 164
- 2018 – Visionary Founder and Creator Award – D.C. Black Repertory Company on its 47th anniversary

== Theatre, film, and television credits ==
=== Theatre - Acting ===
- 1960: A Raisin in the Sun as George Murchison (Broadway)
- 1961: A Taste of Honey as The Boy (Broadway)
- 1962: The Blacks as Village
- 1962: Tiger, Tiger Burning Bright as Dewey Chipley (Broadway)
- 1963: Ballad for Bimshire as Dennis Thornton (Broadway)
- 1963: Arturo Ui as Jim Crockett (Broadway)
- 1963: The Milk Train Doesn't Stop Here Anymore as Stage Assistant
- 1964: Dutchman as Clay
- 1965: Henry V as Henry V
- 1965: Day of Absence
- 1966: Where's Daddy? as Razz (Broadway)
- 1966: The Airborne Symphony as Narrator
- 1967: Hallelujah, Baby! as Clem (Broadway)
- 1968: Kongi's Harvest as Daoudu
- 1973: The Blacks as Village
- 1975: Jesus Christ Superstar as Judas
- 1975: Ceremonies in Dark Old Men as Blue Haven
- 1979: Splendid Mummer as Ira Aldridge
- 1981: Voices of Our People - Ensemble Piece
- 1982: A Soldier's Play as Captain Richard Davenport

=== Theatre - Producer/Director ===
- 1965: We Real Cool
- 1965: Happy Ending and Day of Absence
- 1968: Walk Together Children
- 1967: Song of the Lusitanian Bogey
- 1967: Kongi's Harvest
- 1967: Summer of the Seventeenth Doll
- 1967: Daddy Goodness
- 1968: God Is a (Guess What?)
- 1968: Ceremonies in Dark Old Men
- 1968: The Great MacDaddy
- 1968: String
- 1968: Contribution
- 1968: Malcochon
- 1968: Man Better Man
- 1969: The Reckoning: A Surreal Southern Fable
- 1969: Ceremonies in Dark Old Men
- 1969: The Harangues
- 1969: Brotherhood
- 1969: Day of Absence
- 1970: Ododo
- 1970: Perry's Mission
- 1970: Rosalie Pritchett
- 1970: The Dream on Monkey Mountain
- 1970: Ride a Black Horse
- 1970: Negro Ensemble Company Broadway Benefit
- 1970: D.C. Black Repertory Company –Producer/Founder
- 1973: The Blacks
- 1974: Owen's Song
- 1981: Voices of Our People
- 1982: A Soldier's Play
- 1984: Ceremonies in Dark Old Men

=== Film ===
- 1967: Sweet Love, Bitter as Keel Robinson
- 1967: Hurry Sundown as Reeve Scott
- 1970: Last of the Mobile Hot Shots "Chicken"
- 1970: Carter's Army as Lieutenant Edward Wallace
- 1972: Trouble Man as "Mr. T"
- 1975: Aaron Loves Angela as Beau
- 1977: Airport '77 as Eddie
- 1982: Fast-Walking as William Galliot
- 1984: Star Trek III: The Search for Spock as Admiral Morrow
- 1992: Passenger 57 as FBI Agent Dwight Henderson
- 1993: Posse as David "King David" Lee
- 1996: Fled as Lieutenant Henry Clark

=== Television ===
- 1967–1969: N.Y.P.D. as Detective Jeff Ward
- 1969–1974: The F.B.I. as Wilcox / Steven Harber
- 1969: Mannix as Floyd Brown
- 1969: Then Came Bronson as Henry Tate
- 1970: The Bold Ones as Scott Dayton
- 1971: The Man and the City
- 1973: The Rookies as Barney Miller
- 1973: McMillan and Wife as Sam
- 1974: Marcus Welby, M.D. as Joe Lucas
- 1974: The Streets of San Francisco as Joe Joplin
- 1975: Police Story as Detective Ernie Tillis
- 1975: Petrocelli as Dave Hill
- 1976: Just an Old Sweet Song (television film) as Nate Simmons
- 1979: Backstairs at the White House (television mini-series) as John Mays, Doorman
- 1979: Trapper John, M.D. as Sykes
- 1980: The Facts of Life as Mr. Ramsey
- 1980: The White Shadow as Dr. Luther Tuc
- 1982: WKRP in Cincinnati as prosecutor in the episode "Circumstantial Evidence"
- 1983–1988: Hotel as Joe Durran / Frank "Squire" Vance
- 1983: T. J. Hooker as Police Lieutenant Peter Ellis
- 1984: Dynasty as Dr. Walcott
- 1985: V as George Caniff
- 1986: 227 (TV series) as Congressman Rivers
- 1986–1995: Murder, She Wrote as Kendall Ames / Everett Charles Jensen
- 1989: A Different World as Phillip Dalton
- 1992: Out All Night as Cliff Emory
- 1993 Reasonable Doubts as Kane
- 1993: L.A. Law as Judge Earl Gregory
- 1993: The Fresh Prince of Bel-Air as Dean Morgan
- 1993: The Sinbad Show as Mr. Winters
- 1994–1995: M.A.N.T.I.S. as Mayor Lew Mitchell
- 1994: Family Matters as Dr. Smiley
- 1994–1995: Seinfeld as Joe Temple
- 1995: The Commish as Captain M.A. Daniels
- 1996: Diagnosis Murder as City Attorney Andrew Chivers
- 1997: The Parent 'Hood as Lawrence
- 1999: Clueless as Benjamin Davenport
- 1999: The Hoop Life (television movie) as Joe Sherman
- 2000: Seventeen Again (television movie) as Grandpa Gene Donovan
