= Splendid Mummer =

Play written by Lonne Elder III

- Original language: English
- Written by: Lonne Elder III
- Characters: Ira Frederick Aldridge
- Genre: Monodrama
- Setting: 1800's; New York City; London, England; Europe

Premiere
- Date: April 1988
- Place: American Place Theatre, New York City
- Directed by: Woodie King Jr.

Splendid Mummer is a play by American playwright Lonne Elder III. It is a two act fictional monodrama based on the life of African American Shakespearean tragedian Ira Frederick Aldridge.

== Plot ==
The play explores the extraordinary life of Ira Frederick Aldridge (1807—1867), the first African American actor to achieve international success as a Shakespearean tragedian. The narrative spans from Aldridge's upbringing in New York City, the racial prejudice that prompted him to emigrate to England in 1824, and his ultimate rise to fame as he toured across Great Britain and continental Europe; earning critical acclaim and high honors for his powerful portrayals of Othello, Aaron the Moor, Macbeth, Shylock, and King Lear.

== Production history ==
Splendid Mummer was first performed in 1985 at a developmental workshop at the Southern Illinois University Edwardsville in St. Louis, Missouri. Brought to the campus by the Negro Ensemble Company's Fall tour, the one-night performance featured Robert Hooks as Aldridge and was directed by Adolph Caesar.

The play officially premiered Off Broadway April 24, 1988 at the American Place Theatre in New York City. It starred Charles S. Dutton and was directed by Woodie King Jr., designed as a limited-run that played a total of 17 performances (including previews). Mel Gussow reviewer for The New York Times wrote "Although Mr. Dutton is the only performer on stage [...] he populates the drama with his own commanding talent." After the initial run in New York, Dutton and the production moved to the Arena Stage in Washington, D.C., for another limited engagement.

A production of the play, directed by Anton Phillips and starring Malcom Frederick, was revived at the Fusion Festival in Amsterdam in 1991, before traveling to the King's Head Theatre in London, thereafter followed by a broader tour of the UK.

In 2007, Splendid Mummer returned to London for a revival at the Old Vic Theatre during the Edinburgh International Festival.
