= David Downing (disambiguation) =

David Downing is a British author.

David Downing may also refer to:

- David Downing (actor) (1943–2017), American actor
- David Downing (footballer) (born 1969), English footballer
