= Ceremonies in Dark Old Men =

1969 play by Lonne Elder III

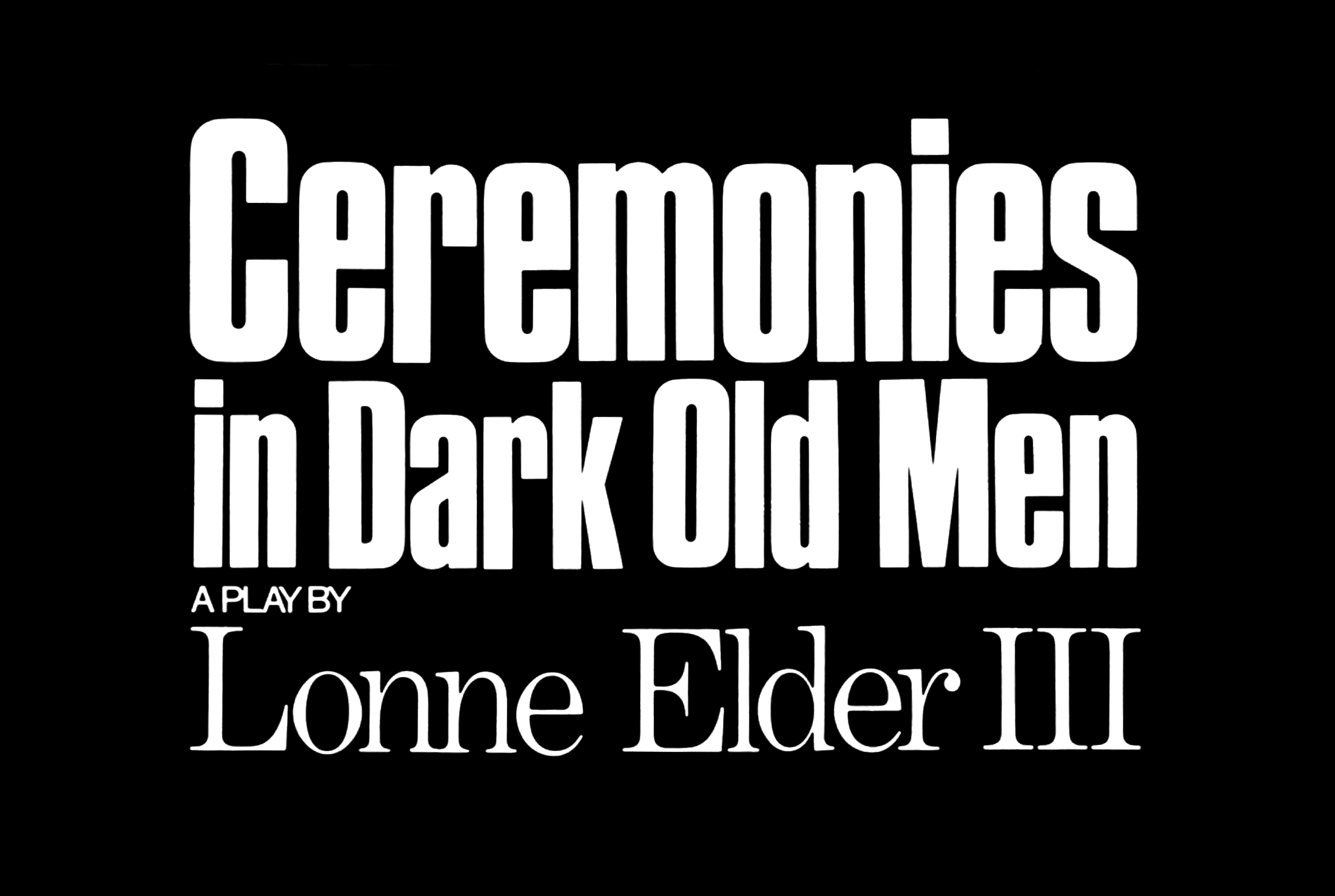
- Original language: English
- Written by: Lonne Elder III
- Characters: Russell B. Parker; William Jenkins; Theopolis Parker; Bobby Parker; Adele Eloise Parker; Blue Haven; Young Girl
- Genre: Naturalistic drama
- Setting: 1950s; a barbershop in Harlem

Premiere
- Date: 04 February 1969
- Place: St. Mark's Playhouse; New York City

Ceremonies in Dark Old Men is a two-act stage play by the American playwright Lonne Elder III. It premiered Off Broadway in a production by the Negro Ensemble Company at St. Mark's Playhouse on February 4, 1969, running for 40 performances. Later in the 1969 season, it received a commercial production at The Pocket Theatre, resulting in a long and successful run that added up to 320 performances. A drama about a struggling American black family living in Harlem, it balances humorous gambits of relief in the tragic circumstances that unfold. Set in the 1950's, the protagonist, Russell B. Parker, is an aging black barbershop owner and widower, persuaded to participate in a bootlegging get-rich-quick scheme by his sons, in spite of the protestations of his dutiful daughter. The play addresses themes of self-deception, greed, the comfort of rituals, and the systemic economic exclusion of African American families.

The play garnered two Drama Desk Awards, Most Promising Playwright for Elder, and Outstanding Performance for Douglas Turner Ward in 1969. That same year, it was published by Farrar, Straus, and Giroux and selected the runner-up for the Pulitzer Prize in drama. James Baldwin stated, "Ceremonies in Dark Old Men is the most truthful play I have seen in a long time. Everyone connected with it deserves a prize, especially the author, Lonne Elder III."'

== Characters ==
- Russell B. Parker: A widower who runs a barbershop that has no customers and who lives upstairs with his daughter and two sons. Parker is not an ambitious man, but he is amiable and ordinarily honest, at least until he is talked into going along with Theo's schemes. He loves his children, and his attempts to recover his youth are touching.
- William Jenkins: Parker's friend and checkers opponent who finds himself drawn into the crooked dealings that Parker's sons undertake. He and Parker obviously feel deep affection for each other as they engage in badinage over their checkers games, which Jenkins always wins.
- Theopolis Parker: Russell Parker's older son, known as Theo. He teams up with Blue Haven to set up a bootlegging business but finds himself doing all the work while his father dips into the till. Theo is eager to run a con, and he has better judgment than his brother Bobby.
- Bobby Parker: Russell Parker's younger son, an expert burglar and shoplifter. As the second son, Bobby resents playing second fiddle to Theo, whose thoughtless insulting descriptions of Bobby probably help compel Bobby to perform reckless criminal acts under the spell of Blue Haven.
- Adele Eloise Parker: Parker's hardworking daughter, who supports the whole family with her office job. Adele is intelligent and conscientious, but she seems doomed to be used by men.
- Blue Haven: A tough man of the streets who knows how to get along and exploit weaker men such as Theo and Bobby. In his blue ensembles and dark glasses, carrying his gold-headed cane, he can become menacing.
- Young Girl: The unnamed pickup with whom Parker becomes infatuated. She is callous and exploitative, and she is a great disappointment to Parker.

== Plot ==
=== Act I ===
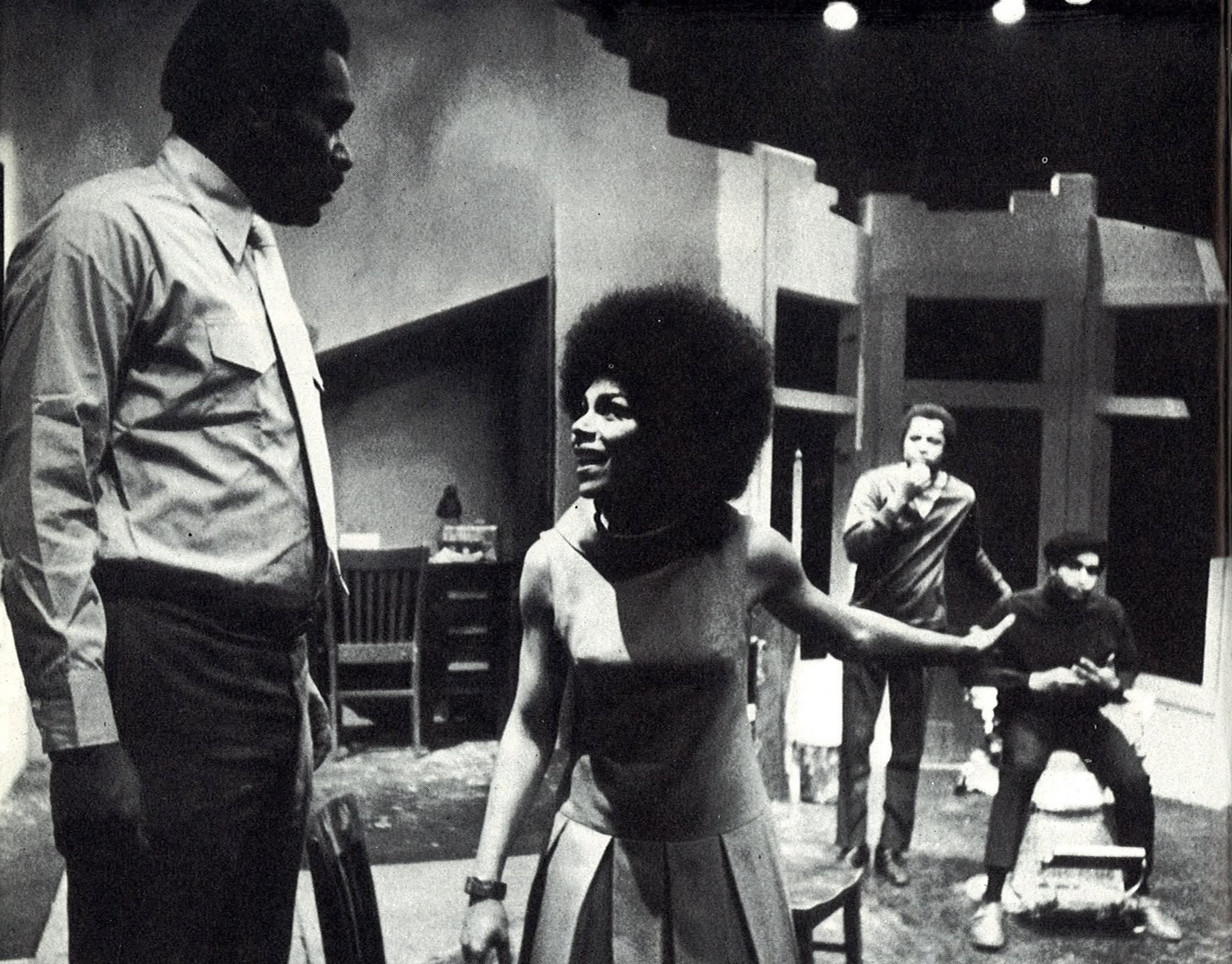
Ceremonies in Dark Old Men, Douglas Turner Ward (Parker), Rosalind Cash, (Adele), William Jay (Theo), David Downing (Bobby), St. Mark's Playhouse, 1969

A floundering Harlem barbershop is the setting and the cauldron of action that leads to tragic consequences. Russell B. Parker, a former vaudeville hoofer, is a man of big dreams but small ambitions. He hardly works at all, often spending the time incessantly playing checkers with his friend, William Jenkins. Parker lives with Theopolis and Bobby, his two unemployed sons, and Adele, his hard-working daughter. The ghost of his dead wife, a woman who drove herself into an early grave working to support the family, nags at his conscience. Adele deeply resents that she is carrying the entire family financially. She announces that she's done supporting her father's failing shop and freeloading brothers. If they do not find paying jobs immediately, she'll shutter the barbershop and kick them out on the street. Theo proposes they go into business selling "black lightning," his homemade corn whiskey, and convinces his father to meet Harlem crime boss Blue Haven. Blue gets them started and receives a cut of the profits in exchange for protection from police raids or rival criminals.

=== Act II ===
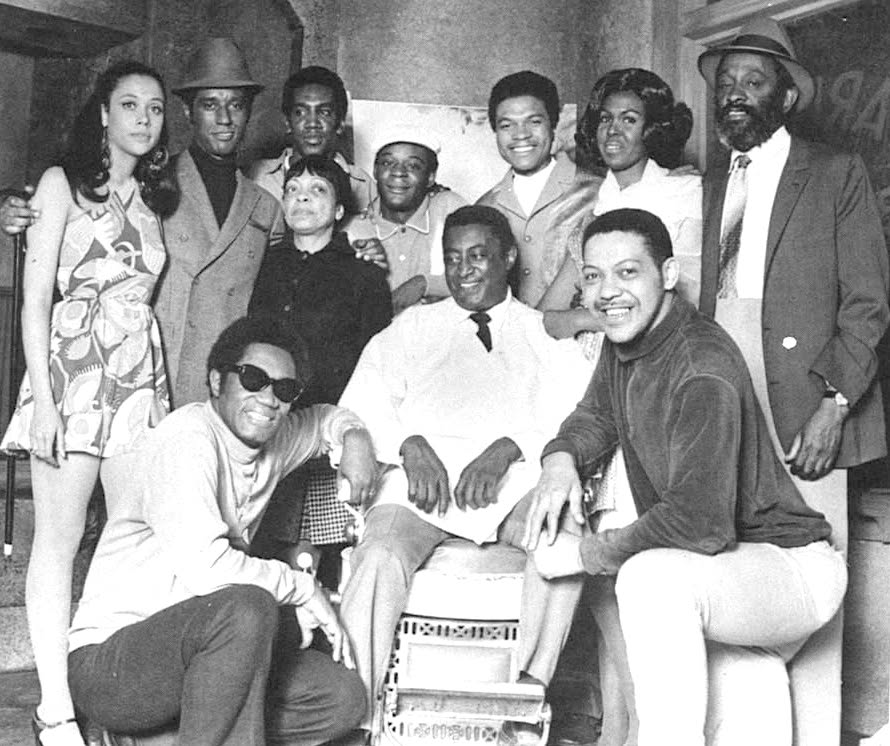
Ceremonies in Dark Old Men, Back Row: Denise Nicholas (Young girl), Carl Lee (Blue Haven), Gertha Brock [costumes], Robert Freeman [rear], unidentified, Billy Dee Williams (Theo), Bette Howard (Adele), Arnold Johnson (Mr. Jenkins); Front Row: Edmund Cambridge [Director], Richard Ward, (Russell B. Parker), Nate Barnett [replacement] (Bobby), after the show, The Pocket Theatre, c. 1970.

When the operation proves successful, Theo becomes the household's new breadwinner, but the family becomes divided. Adele blinds herself to their criminal activities through a romantic distraction. Bobby conspicuously spends time away from the shop and is rumored to be involved in a rash of city burglaries. And Parker often steals money from the operation's till, so he can entertain a Young Girl who has become the object of his affection.

While the family disintegrates and the retribution of Parker's choices threatens everything, he retreats into atmospheric tales of his life in vaudeville. In the final stages of the play, he even attempts to summon dance steps of his youth to little avail. Parker and his family's dreams of a better life cannot shake the spectre of a racist society, bringing their story to a tragic conclusion.

== Themes ==
The play concerns the ceremonies acted out by African American men. Parker is kept afloat by the fact that his daughter Adele works, which gives the family enough of an income to survive. Jenkins, the other "Dark Old Man" of the title, finds a sanctuary in Parker's barbershop, where he trades insults with Parker and plays checkers. This part exemplifies the "ceremonies" of the title, the game. The barbershop provides a place where the two dark old men can be insulated from a society in which they have failed under the norms of the capitalist, racist society of the 1960s. According to the Oxford Companion to African American Literature:

The play is a dramatization of rituals—of survival, of friendship, of deception and manipulation, of self-deception, of black male friendship, of shifting intrafamilial allegiances, and of black manhood. As Elder presents the ineffectual lives of a Harlem family entrapped by rituals of economic and spiritual dependence, he urges African Americans and African American communities to become aware of and to break free of “ceremonies” that assuredly lead to personal loss and tragedy. Echoing Douglas Turner Ward's warning to black Americans whose “happiness” and survival are predicated upon white America's relationship to black America in Happy Ending (1966), Ceremonies challenges the myth that the social, political, and economic plight of black America rests in white people's hands. Through layers of ritual, Elder demonstrates the futility, corruption, and internal disruptions that result from efforts to undermine a capitalist system that seeks to determine and define African Americans’ worth and selfhood.

== Original productions ==
Character	St. Mark's Playhouse, New York City, February 4 — March 9, 1969 (40 performances)	The Pocket Theatre, New York City, April 28, 1969 — February 15, 1970 (320 performances)	Director
Mr. Russell B. Parker	Douglas Turner Ward	Richard Ward	Edmund Cambridge
Mr. William Jenkins	Arthur French	Arnold Johnson	Edmund Cambridge
Theopolis Parker	William Jay	Billy Dee Williams	Edmund Cambridge
Adele Eloise Parker	Rosalind Cash	Bette Howard	Edmund Cambridge
Bobby Parker	David Downing	Richard Mason	Edmund Cambridge
Blue Haven	Samual Blue, Jr.	Carl Lee	Edmund Cambridge
Young Girl	Judyann Elder	Denise Nicholas	Edmund Cambridge

== Critical response ==
Ceremonies in Dark Old Men received positive reviews after its premiere in 1969. The critic and director Harold Clurman of The Nation wrote, "The only new play which has genuinely interested me for some time..." Clive Barnes' review for The New York Times stated, "the honesty has an ironic, bitter aftertaste." Tom Prideaux Life Magazine Theatre Critic remarked, "Ceremonies has pumped life not only into family drama but into old-fashioned playwriting. Shunning the gauze walls and gauzier ambiguities of avante-guarde drama..." John Simon, the theater critic hailed it "a joy for everyone" in his review A Phoenix Too Infrequent featured in New York Magazine. Edith Oliver from The New Yorker stated in her review, “Ceremonies is the first play by Lonne Elder III to be done professionally, and if any American has written a finer one I can’t think what it is.”

== Other productions ==
Subsequent productions of the play have featured many prominent actors, including Denzel Washington, Ruben Santiago-Hudson, Glynn Turman, Keith David, and Norm Lewis.

The Theatre at St. Clements, New York City, April 11, 2025 - June 29, 2025 (44 performances). The revival was heralded as a New York Times Critic's Pick. Directed by Clinton Turner Davis with the following cast:

- Norm Lewis — Mr. Russell B. Parker
- James Foster Jr. — Mr. William Jenkins
- Bryce Michael Wood - Theopolis Parker
- Morgan Siobhan Green - Adele Eloise Parker
- Jeremiah Packer — Bobby Parker
- Calvin M. Thompson — Blue Haven
- Felicia Boswell — Young Girl

Players State Theatre (Coconut Grove Playhouse), Miami, Florida, November 1, 1979 - 1980. (performance numbers unknown) Directed by Charles Turner with the following cast:

- Gilbert Lewis — Mr. Russell B. Parker
- Clarence Thomas — Mr. William Jenkins
- Arnold Wilkerson — Theopolis Parker
- Suzanne Stone — Adele Eloise Parker
- Denzel Washington — Bobby Parker
- John Archie — Blue Haven
- Joy Kelly — Young Girl

Theatre Four, New York City, Negro Ensemble Company, May 15 - June 30, 1985. (62 performances). Directed by Douglas Turner Ward with the following cast:

- Douglas Turner Ward — Mr. Russell B. Parker
- Graham Brown — Mr. William Jenkins
- Ruben Santiago-Hudson — Theopolis Parker
- Patty Holley — Adele Eloise Parker
- Walter Allen Bennett Jr. — Bobby Parker
- Keith David — Blue Haven
- Tracy Camila Johns — Young Girl

Beverly Canon Theater, Los Angeles, Crossroads Theatre, February 5 - March 20, 1988. Directed by Judyann Elder with the following cast:

- Edmund Cambridge — Mr. Russell B. Parker
- Teddy Wilson — Mr. William Jenkins
- Lawrence Hilton Jacobs — Theopolis Parker
- Joan Pringle — Adele Eloise Parker
- Dorian Gibbs — Bobby Parker
- Taurean Blacque — Blue Haven
- Stephanie E. Williams — Young Girl

The Balzer Theater at Herren's, Atlanta, True Colors Theatre Company, July 8 - August 19, 2007. Directed by Kenny Leon with the following cast:

- Glynn Turman — Mr. Russell B. Parker
- Eugene Lee — Mr. William Jenkins
- Brandon J. Dirden — Theopolis Parker
- Karan Kendrick — Adele Eloise Parker
- Jason Dirden — Bobby Parker
- E. Roger Mitchell — Blue Haven
- Cara Patterson — Young Girl

== Awards and nominations ==
=== Original Off Broadway Production ===
Year	Award	Category	Nominee	Result	Ref
1969	Drama Desk Award	Most Promising Playwright	Lonne Elder III	Won	
1969	Drama Desk Award	Outstanding Performance	Douglas Turner Ward	Won	
1969	The Stanley Drama Award	Best Play	Lonne Elder III	Won	
1969	Pulitzer Prize	Drama	Lonne Elder III	Nominated	
1970	Los Angeles Drama Critics Circle Award	Playwriting	Lonne Elder III	Won	
1970	Stella Holt Memorial Playwright's Award	Best Off Broadway Play	Lonne Elder III	Won	
1970	Outer Critics Circle Award	Drama	Lonne Elder III	Won	

=== 1979 Florida Revival Production ===
Year	Award	Category	Nominee	Result	Ref
1979	The Carbonell Award	Supporting Actress	Suzanne Stone	Nominated	

=== 1988 Los Angeles Revival Production ===
Year	Award	Category	Nominee	Result	Ref
1989	NAACP Theatre Award	Best Costume Design	Frank Billecci	Nominated	
1989	NAACP Theatre Award	Best Set Design	Virgil Woodfork & Randall Camp	Nominated	
1989	NAACP Theatre Award	Best Supporting Actor	Taurean Blacque	Nominated	
1989	NAACP Theatre Award	Best Supporting Actor	Teddy Wilson	Nominated	
1989	NAACP Theatre Award	Best Supporting Actor	Lawrence Hilton Jacobs	Nominated	
1989	NAACP Theatre Award	Best Actress	Joan Pringle	Nominated	
1989	NAACP Theatre Award	Best Playwright	Lonne Elder III	Nominated	
1989	NAACP Theatre Award	Best Director	Judyann Elder	Nominated	
1989	NAACP Theatre Award	Best Play		Nominated	

=== 2002 Atlanta Revival Production ===
Year	Award	Category	Nominee	Result	Ref
2007	Suzi Bass Awards	Acting	Jason Dirden	Nominated	
2007	Suzi Bass Awards	Acting	Glynn Turman	Nominated	
2007	Suzi Bass Awards	Outstanding Direction	Kenny Leon	Nominated	

=== 2025 Off Broadway Revival Production ===
Year	Award	Category	Nominee	Result	Ref
2025	Off Broadway Alliance Awards	Best Revival		Nominated	
2025	AUDELCO Award	Best Set Designer	Harry Feiner	Nominated	
2025	AUDELCO Award	Best Costume Design	Isabel Rubio	Nominated	
2025	AUDELCO Award	Best Director of a Play	Clinton Turner Davis	Nominated	
2025	AUDELCO Award	Featured Actor in a Play	Calvin M. Thompson	Nominated	
2025	AUDELCO Award	Featured Actor in a Play	Bryce Michael Wood	Nominated	
2025	AUDELCO Award	Featured Actress in a Play	Felicia Boswell	Nominated	
2025	AUDELCO Award	Featured Actress in a Play	Morgan Siobhan Green	Nominated	
2025	AUDELCO Award	Lead Actor in a Play	Norm Lewis	Won	
2026	Drama Desk Award	Outstanding Scenic Design of a Play	Harry Feiner	Nominated	
2026	Drama Desk Award	Outstanding Revival of a Play		Nominated	

== Television adaptation ==
Ceremonies in Dark Old Men was made into a television movie in 1975. Directed by Michael Schultz, it aired on ABC with the following cast: Douglas Turner Ward (Russell B. Parker), Rosalind Cash (Adele), Robert Hooks (Blue Haven), Glynn Turman (Theo), J. Eric Bell (Bobby), Michele Shay (Young Girl), and Godfrey Cambridge (Mr. Jenkins).

== Audio recording ==
L.A. Theatre Works included the play as a part of their 2008–2009 season. Directed by Judyann Elder, the audio rendition was recorded before a live audience at the Skirball Cultural Center in Los Angeles. It featured the following cast: Glynn Turman (Russell B. Parker), Charlie Robinson (Mr. Jenkins), Brandon J. Dirden (Theo), Michole Briana White (Adele), Jason Dirden (Bobby), Julia Pace Mitchell (Young girl), and Rocky Carroll (Blue Haven).
