= Lonne Elder III =

American dramatist (1927–1996)

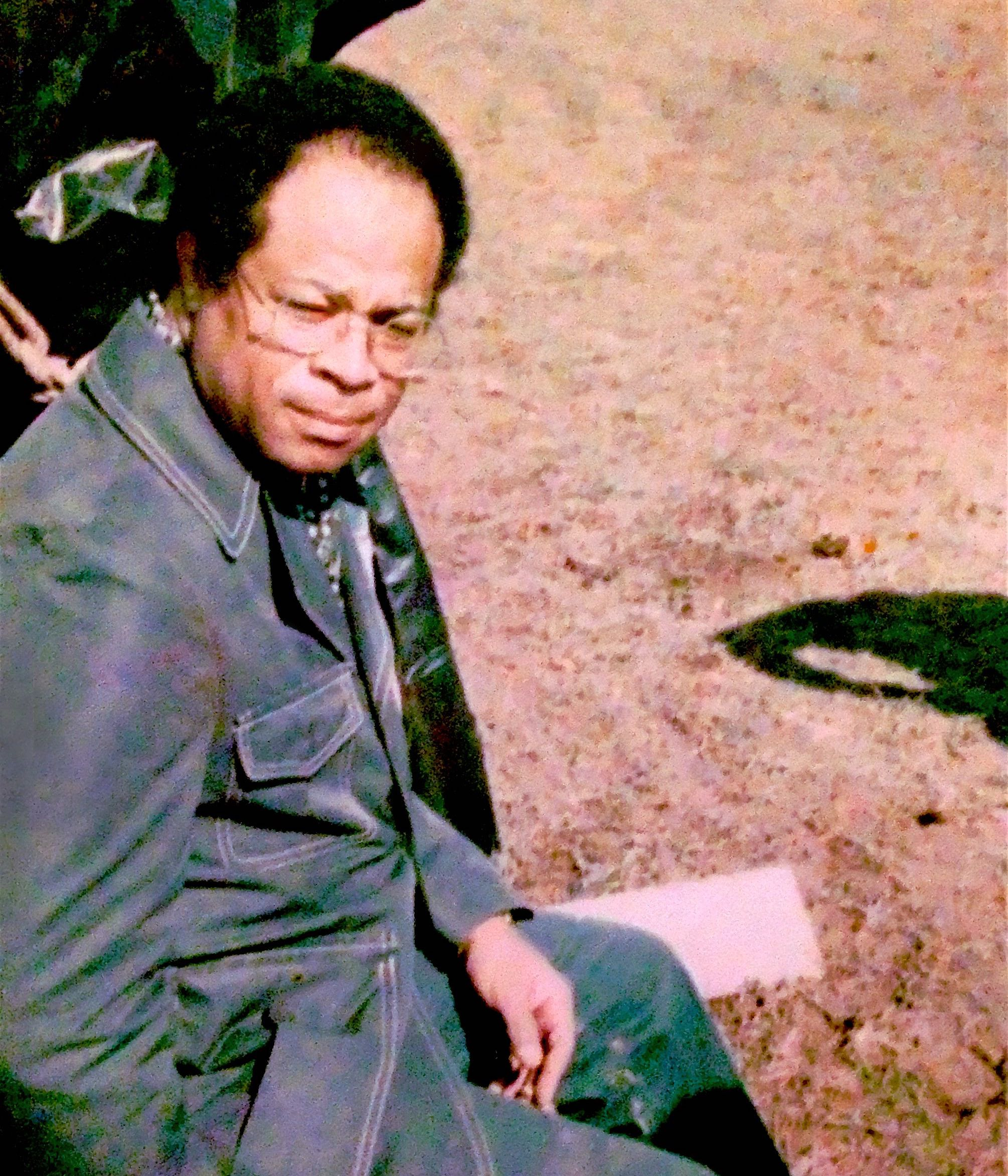
- Elder in 1973
- Born: December 26, 1927; Americus, Georgia, United States
- Died: June 11, 1996 (aged 68); Woodland Hills, California, United States
- Occupations: actor; playwright; screenwriter
- Years active: 1955–96
- Notable work: Ceremonies in Dark Old Men; Sounder
- Spouses: Betty Gross (m. 1963; div. 1967) Judyann Elder (m. 1969; div. 1994)
- Children: Loni-Christine; Xian; David
- Parent(s): Quincy Elder, Lonne Elder II
- Awards: Drama Desk Award; Writers Guild of America Award; NAACP Image Award; Black Filmmakers Hall of Fame
- Website: www.lonneelder.com

Lonne Elder III (December 26, 1927 – June 11, 1996) was an American actor, playwright and screenwriter. He is the first Black writer to be nominated for an Academy Award for Best Adapted Screenplay.

In the 1960s, Elder was one of the African American figures who reshaped the New York theatre world. His most celebrated play, Ceremonies in Dark Old Men, was produced by the Negro Ensemble Company in 1969. It won him a Drama Desk Award, a nomination for the Pulitzer Prize in drama, and featured a cast that included Douglas Turner Ward, Rosalind Cash, and later Billy Dee Williams.

One of the first Black screenwriters active in mainstream Hollywood, he wrote the 1972 movie Sounder, about Black sharecroppers in Louisiana struggling to survive the Great Depression. The film was directed by Martin Ritt and it starred Cicely Tyson, Paul Winfield, and Kevin Hooks.

== Early life ==
Born in Americus, Georgia, to Lonne Elder II and Quincy Elder, Elder grew up in impoverished conditions during the Great Depression. As a small child, his mother encouraged him to read and, he reported that storytelling often occupied his mind. In an interview with Liz Gant in Black World he said:

“Actually, I first started writing when I was about six or seven years old, though not with the idea of being a "writer". I don’t think I even knew what a writer was. I just liked the idea of writing to myself; it was a way of expressing feelings that I didn’t know how to express in other ways, like talking. There was no one to whom I could convey those kind of thoughts and emotions in the environment I grew up in."

Due to tragic circumstances, Elder was orphaned at a young age and his aunt and uncle in Jersey City, New Jersey continued his upbringing, along with that of his four siblings. His uncle was a numbers runner, and Elder followed him on his rounds, collecting betting slips. Elder completed his formal education and attended The New Jersey State Teachers' College (now The College of New Jersey) in Trenton in 1949, but dropped out before the end of his freshman year. He then moved to New York's Harlem neighborhood, took classes at the New School for Social Research, and became involved in the growing civil rights movement. In 1952, Elder was drafted into the United States Army, where he served for two years.

== Career ==
=== Acting, writing, and A Raisin in the Sun ===
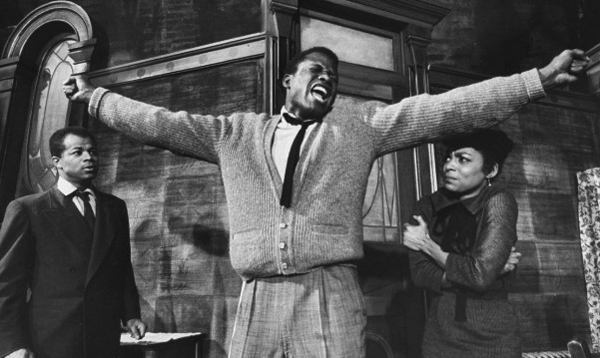
A Raisin in the Sun, Lonne Elder III, Sidney Poitier, Ruby Dee, 1959

Returning from the army, Elder immersed himself in the Harlem literary scene, receiving direct encouragement from poets Robert Hayden and Langston Hughes, among others and began honing his talent as a writer. Working as a stage actor, Elder landed the role of Bobo in the original Broadway run of Lorraine Hansberry's A Raisin in the Sun in 1959. Inspired by Hansberry and his friendship with dramatist Douglas Turner Ward, Elder set his sights on becoming a playwright.

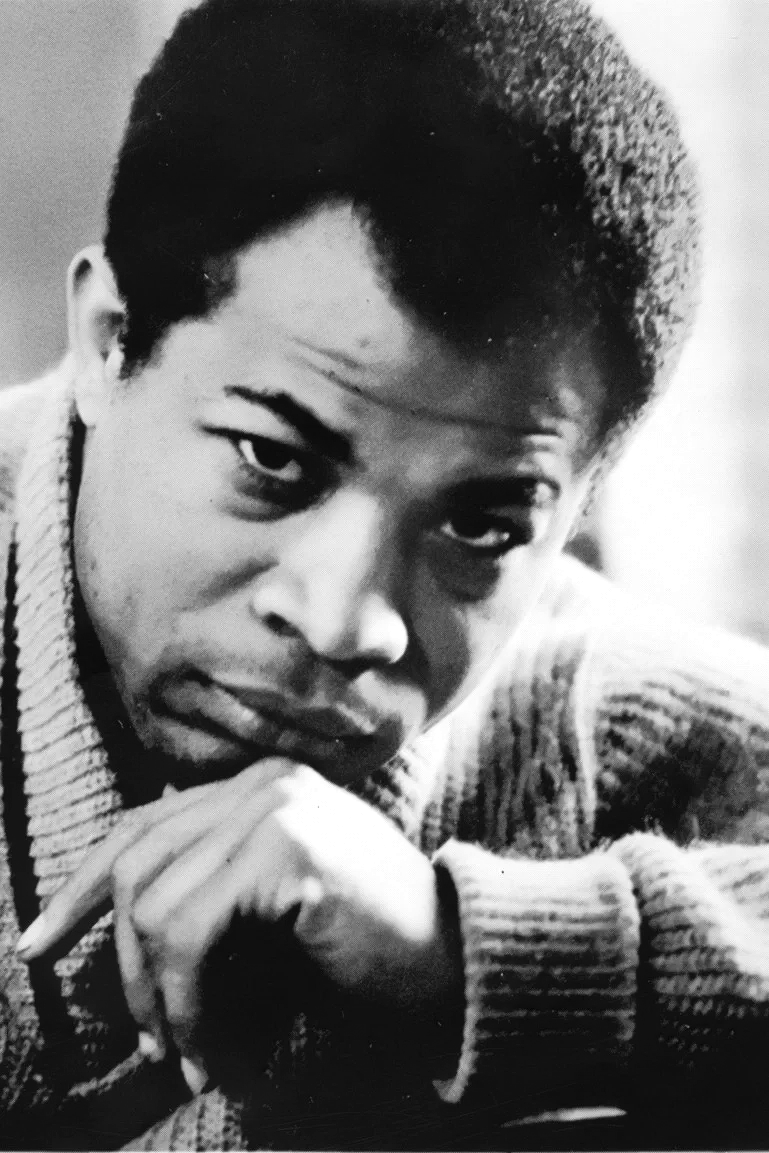
Lonne Elder III, c. 1960

Sharing an apartment with Ward also helped inspire Elder to write a play titled A Hysterical Turtle in a Rabbit Race (1961). It was an early expression of Elder's chosen theme of the Black family in a hostile America. In 1965, he appeared in a production of Ward's play Day of Absence.

That same year his play Ceremonies in Dark Old Men was given a reading at Wagner College on Staten Island. The reading of the play propelled him to a fellowship in screenwriting at the Yale University School of Drama in 1966 and 1967, and won him several financial awards. His one-act play Charades on East Fourth Street, which depicted a clash between community members and police, was performed at the Expo ’67 World’s Fair in Montreal, Canada.

Elder served as director of the new Negro Ensemble Company's playwrights’ division from 1967 until 1969, and when they launched their first season at New York's St. Mark's Playhouse in 1969, Ceremonies in Dark Old Men was selected for production.

=== Ceremonies in Dark Old Men and early success ===
The Negro Ensemble Company’s Ceremonies in Dark Old Men was one of the most meaningful theatrical events of the late sixties, a culmination of Elder’s meditations on the Black family unit in a hostile American society. Edith Oliver from The New Yorker stated in her review, “Ceremonies is the first play by Lonne Elder III to be done professionally, and if any American has written a finer one I can’t think what it is.” James Baldwin remarked, "Ceremonies in Dark Old Men is the most truthful play I have seen in a long time. Everyone connected with it deserves a prize, especially the author, Lonne Elder III."

Ceremonies garnered positive reviews, and was the runner-up for the 1969 Pulitzer Prize in drama, along with several other drama awards. The play deals with a 1950s Harlem family—Russell B. Parker, a barber (portrayed by Ward in the original production) who spends most of his time reminiscing about his glory days as a vaudeville dancer, his two unemployed sons, who live on the edge of the law, and his daughter, who resentfully supports the family. Elder said:

“I wrote to write, out of my guts and my heart, I wanted to cause some kind of wonder in the minds of people. I don’t rant or rave about the terror of our racist society. It is never directly stated, it is just there.”

When the play returned for an Off Broadway revival starring Norm Lewis in 2025, it was named a New York Times Critics' Pick. It is considered a classic American play and the bridge between Hansberry in the 1950's and August Wilson in the 1980’s. Other productions have nurtured the stage careers of Denzel Washington, Ruben Santiago-Hudson, Keith David, and Glynn Turman.

=== Sounder and writing in Hollywood ===
==== 1970s ====
When Elder arrived in Los Angeles to pursue his screenwriting career, he had already made a mark in TV writing an episode of N.Y.P.D. ("Deadly Circle of Violence"), notable for featuring Al Pacino's first on-screen acting credit. He worked extensively as a contracted studio screenwriter for major film companies such as Columbia Pictures, United Artists, and Paramount.

His first motion picture assignment was adapting William H. Armstrong's novel Sounder (1972) into a screenplay to be directed by acclaimed director Martin Ritt. The movie, a story about a poor family of Southern sharecroppers in the Great Depression, enjoyed instantaneous success.

Pauline Kael, in her review of Sounder, wrote: "The director, Martin Ritt, working from a scrupulous, unsentimental script by Lonne Elder III, based on the William H. Armstrong novel, avoids charging up the scenes [...] the movie earns every emotion we feel. And I think it will move audiences – move them truly, that is – as few films ever have."

The film garnered four nominations at the 45th Academy Awards including Best Adapted Screenplay and Elder went on to write the sequel. The same year Sounder received acclaim, Elder wrote Melinda (1972); a blaxploitation noir-infused crime drama that blended mystery, action, and social commentary. It starred actors Calvin Lockhart, Rosalind Cash, and marked the screen debut of future martial arts icon Jim Kelly. Elder played a pivotal role in launching Kelly's career, initially introducing him to Lockhart to train the actor in karate for the production. Impressed by his presence and expertise, the filmmakers brought Kelly on as a technical advisor and ultimately cast him in his first acting role.

Elder went on to develop and write A Woman Called Moses (1978), the biographical TV mini-series of fugitive slave leader Harriet Tubman’s life, reuniting him with Cicely Tyson and featuring narration by Orson Welles. It was one of the earliest dramatizations on the life of Tubman to meet the screen. A Woman Called Moses garnered Elder the Writers Guild of America Award and his second Christopher Award.

==== 1980s ====
In 1981, a collaboration with Richard Pryor resulted in the screenplay for Bustin' Loose, a comic tale of an ex-felon who finds redemption through driving a busload of handicapped children to a farm-land oasis. The movie received mixed reviews.

Elder became disillusioned with Hollywood. It is speculated that it may have been the result of his efforts to change the way Black people were portrayed in films and TV, he was kept on the payroll by studio employers but denied work on important projects. “They decided they were going to teach me a lesson, and for two years I couldn’t get arrested,” he told the Washington Post.

== Last years ==
Elder returned Off Broadway bringing Splendid Mummer to the stage in 1988. A monodrama about the 19th century life of the first African American Shakespearean actor, Ira Frederick Aldridge, it starred Charles S. Dutton and was directed by Woodie King Jr.. Splendid Mummer was subsequently revived in 1991 in Amsterdam, Netherlands, and 2007 at The Old Vic Theatre in London, England.

In 1990 Elder was called in to re-write the book version of King, a British musical about the life of the Rev. Dr. Martin Luther King Jr. directed by Clarke Peters and featuring song lyrics by Maya Angelou.

== Personal life ==
In the early 1960s, Elder balanced scarce acting opportunities, working as a waiter and a telephone clerk by day, and dealing underground poker at night. He married Betty Gross in 1963; the couple had a son named David, before divorcing four years later. Elder married actress Judyann Elder in 1969, whom he met running the playwriting division at the Negro Ensemble Company. Following the birth of their son in 1970, Christian (Xian), the family relocated to Los Angeles. They welcomed a daughter, Loni-Christine, in 1980. Elder and his second wife divorced in 1994 and he was survived by three siblings.

== Death ==
Lonne Elder III died in Woodland Hills, California, on June 11, 1996, after a long illness.

== Theatre ==
=== Plays ===
- 1961: A Hysterical Rabbit in a Turtle Race
- 1966: Kissing Rattlesnakes Can Be Fun
- 1966: Seven Comes Up and Seven Comes Down
- 1967: Charades on East Fourth Street
- 1969: Ceremonies in Dark Old Men
- 1988: Splendid Mummer

=== Acting ===
- 1959: A Raisin in the Sun (as Bobo), Ethel Barrymore Theatre, New York City
- 1965: Day of Absence (as Clem), St. Mark's Playhouse, New York City

=== Musicals ===
- 1990: King (Book)

== Filmography ==
=== Film ===
Year	Title	Writer	Actor	Notes
1972	Sounder	Yes	No	
1972	Melinda	Yes	Yes	as Lieutenant Daniels
1976	Sounder, Part 2	Yes	No	
1976	Sparkle	Yes	No	(uncredited first draft), with Joel Schumacher
1981	Bustin' Loose	Yes	No	with Richard Pryor and Roger L. Simon

=== Television ===
Year	Title	Writer	Actor	Notes
1963	Camera Three	Yes	No	Episode: "The Terrible Veil" (CBS)
1968	N.Y.P.D.	Yes	No	Episode: "Deadly Circle of Violence" (ABC)
1970—1971	McCloud	Yes	No	Staff Writer (NBC)
1971	Day of Absence	No	Yes	TV movie, as Clem (PBS)
1972	Soul!	No	Yes	Episode: "Black Fire" Himself (PBS)
1973	Toma	Yes	No	Episode: "Blockhouse Breakdown" (ABC)
1973	Pomroy's People	No	Yes	Pilot, role unknown (ABC)
1975	Ceremonies in Dark Old Men	Yes	No	Adapted from his play, TV movie (ABC)
1978	A Woman Called Moses	Yes	No	mini-series (NBC)
1982	Thou Shalt Not Kill	Yes	No	TV movie (NBC)
1989	Runaway	Yes	No	with Delle Chatman and Felice Holman
1992	I'll Fly Away	Yes	No	Episode: "The Third Man" (NBC)

== Poetry ==
- 1957: Scenes in the City (edited by Langston Hughes) A Modern Jazz Symposium of Music and Poetry

== Awards and nominations ==
Year	Award	Categorgy	Project	Result	Ref
Theatre Awards
1969	Pulitzer Prize	Drama	Ceremonies in Dark Old Men	Nominated	
1969	Vernon Rice/Drama Desk Award	Most Promising Playwright	Ceremonies in Dark Old Men	Won	
1969	The Stanley Drama Award	Best Play	Ceremonies in Dark Old Men	Won	
1969	The Outer Critics' Circle Award	Drama	Ceremonies in Dark Old Men	Won	
1969	The Stella Holt Memorial Playwrights Award		Ceremonies in Dark Old Men	Won	
1970	The Los Angeles Drama Critics' Circle Award	Playwriting	Ceremonies in Dark Old Men	Won	
1989	NAACP Theatre Award	Best Play	Ceremonies in Dark Old Men	Nominated	
Fiilm and Television Awards
1972	Atlanta Film Festival	Silver Award	Sounder	Won	
1973	Academy Awards	Best Adapted Screenplay	Sounder	Nominated	
1973	Writers Guild of America Award	Best Drama Adapted from Another Medium	Sounder	Nominated	
1973	Christopher Award	Best Picture	Sounder	Won	
1973	USC Film Conference Award of Merit			Won	
1979	Writers Guild of America Award	Anthology Adaptation	A Woman Called Moses	Won	
1979	Christopher Award	Television	A Woman Called Moses	Won	
1979	NAACP Image Award	Outstanding Writing in a Television Movie, Mini-Series or Dramatic Special	A Woman Called Moses	Won	
1979	American Historical Society Award			Won	
1979	Black Filmmakers Hall of Fame Award	Career Achievement		Won	
