= Adolph Caesar =

American actor (1933–1986)

- Caesar in 1979
- Born: December 5, 1933; Harlem, New York City, U.S.
- Died: March 6, 1986 (aged 52); Los Angeles, California, U.S.
- Education: New York University
- Occupation: Actor
- Years active: 1969–1986
- Known for: Playing Sgt. Waters in A Soldier's Play and its film adaptation A Soldier's Story
- Spouse: Diane Caesar (m. 1986)
- Children: 3

Adolph Caesar (December 5, 1933 – March 6, 1986) was an American film and theater actor. Known for his signature deep voice, Caesar was a staple of off-Broadway as a member of the Negro Ensemble Company, and as a voiceover artist for numerous film trailers. He earned widespread acclaim for his performance as Sgt. Vernon Waters in Charles Fuller's Pulitzer Prize-winning A Soldier's Play, a role he reprised in the 1984 film adaptation A Soldier's Story, for which he received Academy Award and Golden Globe Award nominations, and won an NAACP Image Award for Outstanding Actor in a Motion Picture.

== Early life, family and education ==
Caesar was born in Harlem, New York City, New York, in 1933, the youngest of three sons born to a Dominican mother and an African-American and Indigenous American father. At age 12, he contracted laryngitis which resulted in his notably deep voice.

After graduating from George Washington High School in 1952, Caesar enlisted in the United States Navy during the Korean War era, serving as a hospital corpsman for five years, and achieving the rank of chief petty officer. Upon his discharge from service, he decided to pursue a career in theater, studying drama at New York University, graduating in 1962.

== Career ==
=== Early career ===
Caesar made his film debut in 1969 in Che!, playing Cuban revolutionary Juan Almeida Bosque. A year later, Caesar became an announcer for and then joined the Negro Ensemble Company in 1970 for productions such as The River Niger, Square Root of the Soul, and The Brownsville Raid. Caesar also later worked with the Minnesota Theater Company, Inner City Repertory Company, and the American Shakespeare Theatre. He had a stint on the soap operas Guiding Light and General Hospital in 1964 and 1969, respectively.

Thanks to his voice, Caesar found frequent work as a voiceover artist for television and radio commercials, including theatrical previews and radio commercials for many blaxploitation films such as Cleopatra Jones, Superfly, Truck Turner and The Spook Who Sat by the Door. For many years, he was the voice of the United Negro College Fund's publicity campaign, reciting the iconic slogan "...because a mind is a terrible thing to waste."

Later in his career, Caesar also lent his voice to the animated series Silverhawks, in which he voiced Hotwing, a magician and skilled illusionist.

In 1980, Caesar appeared in the infamous Bruceploitation mockumentary Fist of Fear, Touch of Death, playing himself as a fictional television news reporter investigating the death of Bruce Lee.

=== A Soldier's Play ===
Caesar’s most iconic work started with his role as US Army Sergeant Vernon C. Waters in Charles Fuller's Pulitzer Prize-winning stage drama, A Soldier's Play, for which Caesar won Drama Desk Award for Outstanding Featured Actor in a Play and an Obie Award for Outstanding Off-Broadway Achievement. A Soldier’s Play is set in Louisiana during World War II. Sgt. Waters is an ambitious Black drill sergeant who strives for recognition for African-American soldiers while detesting "Geechees", as he terms uneducated, subservient, and unintelligent southern Blacks, as an obstacle to racial equality and the success of the future African American upper class, and who need to be removed at all costs. The play and film are a murder mystery that unfolds in flashbacks, as a Black JAG Captain investigates Sgt. Waters' murder.

In a 1985 interview with the Los Angeles Times, Caesar stated, while crafting the character of Waters, he drew on his experiences with racism in Classical theatre. "I’d studied Shakespeare to death.... After I did one season at a Shakespearean repertory company, a director said to me, ‘You have a marvelous voice. You know the king’s English well. You speak iambic pentameter. My suggestion is that you go to New York and get a good colored role.' Waters has tried his best, but no matter what you do, they still hate you." Caesar subsequently coined the character's signature phrase, "They still hate you."

Caesar reprised his role as Waters in Norman Jewison's 1984 film A Soldier's Story, an adaptation of Fuller's play. His performance was acclaimed and earned him numerous accolades, including Academy Award and Golden Globe Award nominations for Best Supporting Actor, and an NAACP Image Award for Outstanding Actor in a Motion Picture. He also won the Los Angeles Film Critics Association Award for Best Supporting Actor.

=== Later career ===
On the basis of his Soldier's Story success, Caesar was cast in Steven Spielberg's The Color Purple as Old Mister Johnson, the father of Danny Glover's character. He also appeared on an episode of The Twilight Zone and an ABC Afterschool Special. Caesar's last completed film was Club Paradise, which was released posthumously.

== Personal life and death ==
Caesar had three children with his wife Diane, whom he was married to until his death.

Caesar was working on the Los Angeles set of the 1986 film Tough Guys (with Burt Lancaster and Kirk Douglas) when he suffered a heart attack and died a short time later. His role was recast with Eli Wallach. He was interred at the Ferncliff Cemetery in Hartsdale, New York.

== Works ==
=== Film ===
Year	Title	Role	Director	Notes
1969	Che!	Juan Almeida	Richard Fleischer	
1975	Tarzoon: Shame of the Jungle	Brutish (voice)	Picha; Boris Szulzinger	English-language version
1979	The Hitter	Nathan	Christopher Leitch	
1980	Fist of Fear, Touch of Death	Himself	Matthew Mallinson	
1984	A Soldier's Story	Sgt. Vernon Waters	Norman Jewison	
1985	The Color Purple	Old Mister Johnson	Steven Spielberg	
1986	Club Paradise	Prime Minister Solomon Gundy	Harold Ramis	Released posthumously

=== Television ===
Year	Title	Role	Notes
1968	The Wild Wild West	Vidoq	Episode: "The Night of the Gruesome Games"
1969	General Hospital	Douglas Burke	
1970	The Challenge	Clarence Opano	Television film
1978	Watch Your Mouth	Jeff Cremer	2 episodes
1984	Guiding Light	Zamana	
1985	Tales from the Darkside	Mars Gillis	Episode: "Parlour Floor Front"
1986	The Twilight Zone	The Supervisor	Episode: "A Matter of Minutes"
1986	Fortune Dane	Charles Dane	Episode: "Pilot"
1986	ABC Afterschool Specials	Dr. Rancid	Episode: "Getting Even: A Wimp's Revenge"
1986	SilverHawks	Hotwing / Seymour (voices)	Main cast

=== Theatre (partial) ===
Year	Title	Role	Director	Theatre	Notes
1965–67	Happy Ending / Day of Absence	Jackson	Philip Meister	St. Mark's Playhouse	
1971	Rosalee Pritchett	Robert Barron	Shauneille Perry	St. Mark's Playhouse	
1971	Perry's Mission	Lester "Bobo" Johnson	Douglas Turner Ward	St. Mark's Playhouse	
1971	Ride a Black Horse	Harold	Douglas Turner Ward	St. Mark's Playhouse	
1971	Mary Stuart	Count Bellievre	Jules Irving	Vivian Beaumont Theater	Broadway debut
1971–72	The Sty of the Blind Pig	Doc	Shauneille Perry	St. Mark's Playhouse	
1972	A Ballet Behind the Bridge	Lalsingh	Douglas Turner Ward	St. Mark's Playhouse	Also choreographer
1972	Frederick Douglass...Through His Own Words	Frederick Douglass	Douglas Turner Ward	St. Mark's Playhouse	Also playwright
1974	Nowhere to Run, Nowhere to Hide	The Newscaster	Dean Irby	St. Mark's Playhouse	
1975	Waiting for Mongo	Doodybug	Douglas Turner Ward	St. Mark's Playhouse	
1976–77	The Brownsville Raid	Pvt. James Holliman	Israel Hicks	Lucille Lortel Theatre	
1977	The Square Root of Soul	—N/a	Perry Schwartz	Lucille Lortel Theatre	As playwright
1979	Plays from Africa		Dean Irby	St. Mark's Playhouse	
1979	A Season to Unravel	Garrison	Glenda Dickerson	St. Mark's Playhouse	
1980	Lagrima del Diablo	Aquilo	Richard Gant	St. Mark's Playhouse	
1981–83	A Soldier's Play	Sgt. Vernon Waters	Douglas Turner Ward	Julia Miles Theater	

== Awards and honors ==
Award	Year	Category	Nominated work	Outcome
Academy Award	1985	Best Supporting Actor	A Soldier's Story	Nominated
Daytime Emmy Award	1987	Outstanding Performer in Children's Programming	ABC Afterschool Specials ("Getting Even: A Wimp's Revenge")	Nominated
Drama Desk Award	1982	Outstanding Featured Actor in a Play	A Soldier's Play	Won
Golden Globe Award	1985	Best Supporting Actor – Motion Picture	A Soldier's Story	Nominated
Los Angeles Film Critics Association	1984	Best Supporting Actor	A Soldier's Story	Won
NAACP Image Award	1985	Outstanding Actor in a Motion Picture	A Soldier's Story	Won
Obie Award	1983	Outstanding Off-Broadway Achievement	A Soldier's Play	Won
