= Douglas Turner Ward =

American playwright and actor (1930–2021)

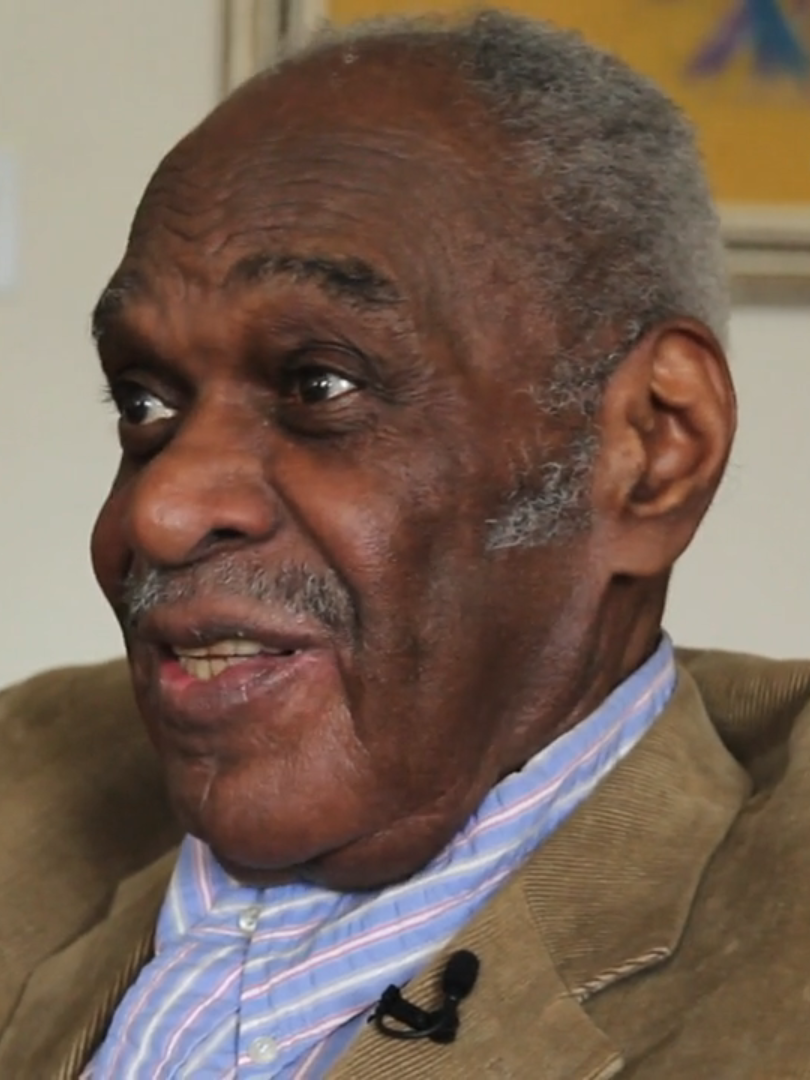
- Ward in the 2012 documentary The Lion at Rest
- Born: Roosevelt Ward Jr. May 5, 1930; Burnside, Louisiana, U.S.
- Died: February 20, 2021 (aged 90); Manhattan, New York, U.S.
- Education: University of Michigan
- Occupations: Playwright, actor, director, theatrical producer
- Writing career
- Period: 1959–2021
- Notable awards: Drama Desk Award; Happy Ending and Day of Absence
- Website: www.douglasturnerward.com

Douglas Turner Ward (May 5, 1930 – February 20, 2021) was an American playwright, actor, director, and theatrical producer. He was noted for being a founder and artistic director of the Negro Ensemble Company (NEC). He was nominated for the Tony Award for Best Featured Actor in a Play in 1974 for his role in The River Niger, which he also directed.

== Early life ==
Ward was born Roosevelt Ward Jr. in Burnside, Louisiana, on May 5, 1930. His parents, Roosevelt Ward and Dorothy (Short), were poor farmers who also owned a tailoring business. They relocated to New Orleans when Ward was eight years old, and he went to Xavier University Preparatory School. He was accepted by Wilberforce University in 1946, before transferring to the University of Michigan. He majored in politics and theater, but dropped out of college at the age of 19 and relocated to New York City. There, he became friends with Lorraine Hansberry and Lonne Elder III.

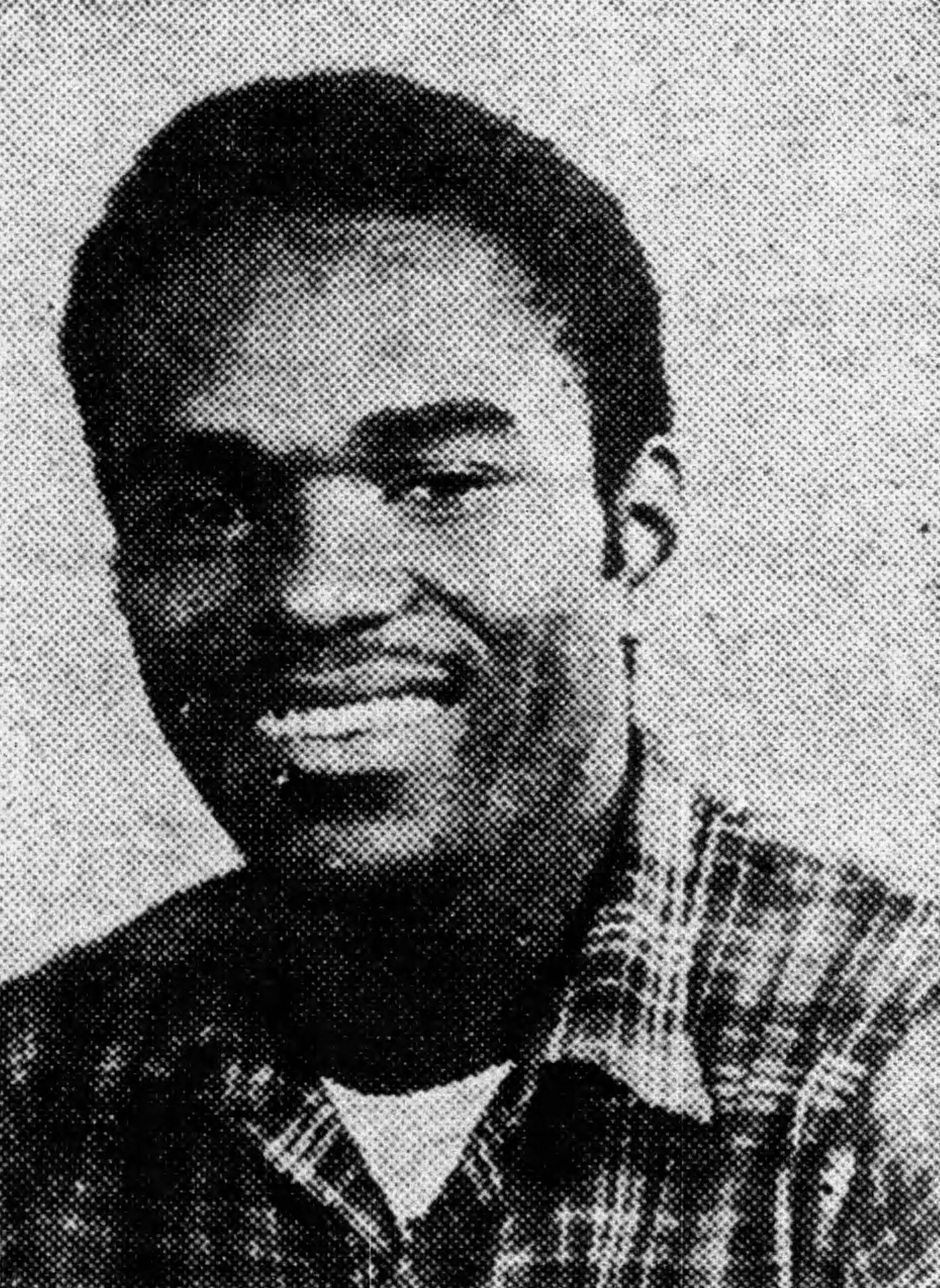
Ward c. 1951

Ward became a member of the Progressive Party at the end of the 1940s and aligned himself on the left of the political spectrum. He was imprisoned in New Orleans while appealing his conviction for draft evasion. After his conviction was reversed, he returned to New York and worked as a reporter for the Daily Worker. Ward also joined the Paul Mann Actors Workshop to study theater. He subsequently adopted the stage name Douglas Turner Ward, a tribute to his two role models: Frederick Douglass and Nat Turner.

== Career ==
As an actor, Turner made one of his first performances in The Iceman Cometh by Eugene O'Neill in 1956, at the Circle in the Square Theatre. Three years later, he made his Broadway debut in a small role in A Raisin in the Sun, alongside Sidney Poitier and Claudia McNeil. His first significant artistic achievement would be as a playwright, however.

Happy Ending/Day of Absence, a program of two one-act plays, premiered at the St. Mark's Playhouse in Manhattan on November 15, 1965. It ultimately ran for 504 performances over 15 months, enduring through the 1966 transit strike. That same year, Ward authored an opinion piece in The New York Times titled "American Theater: For Whites Only?" The piece garnered a grant from W. McNeil Lowry of the Ford Foundation. Ward later received his first Drama Desk Award for outstanding new playwright.

Ward was one of the founders of the Negro Ensemble Company in 1967, and served for many years as its artistic director. It notably produced The River Niger (1972), which won the Tony Award for Best Play in 1974 and was adapted as a film of the same name two years later. Ward himself acted in and directed that play, receiving a nomination for Best Featured Actor in a Play. The company also produced Home (1979) by Samm-Art Williams and A Soldier's Play (1981) by Charles Fuller. The latter won the Pulitzer Prize for Drama and was adapted into the 1984 film A Soldier's Story.

Ward was enshrined into the American Theater Hall of Fame in 1996. He was also conferred the Martin Luther King Jr. Humanitarian Award. He published The Haitian Chronicles in March 2020, having worked on the three-play series for around four decades. He viewed the series, which focused on the Haitian Revolution, as his magnum opus and intended to have it staged by NEC alumni.

== Personal life ==
Ward married Diana Powell Ward in 1966. Together, they had two children: Elizabeth Ward–Cuprill and Douglas Powell Ward.

Ward died on February 20, 2021, at his home in Manhattan. He was 90 years old.

== Selected credits ==
=== Theatre ===
==== Directing ====
Year	Production	Theatre(s)	Notes
1982	A Soldier's Play	Lucille Lortel Theatre	Drama Desk Award nomination
1980	Zooman and the Sign	Theatre Four	
1979	Home	St. Mark's Playhouse	
1975	The First Breeze of Summer	St. Mark's Playhouse	
1972	The River Niger	St. Mark's Playhouse	
1970	Day of Absence	St. Mark's Playhouse	Part of a program of two one-act plays with Brotherhood
1970	Brotherhood	St. Mark's Playhouse	Part of a program of two one-act plays with Day of Absence
1968	Daddy Goodness	St. Mark's Playhouse	

==== Writing ====
Year	Production	Theatre(s)	Notes
1983	The Redeemer	Theatre Four	Part of a program of three one-act plays, entitled About Heaven and Earth
1970	Day of Absence	St. Mark's Playhouse	Part of a program of two one-act plays with Brotherhood
1970	Brotherhood	St. Mark's Playhouse	Part of a program of two one-act plays with Day of Absence
1969	The Reckoning	St. Mark's Playhouse	
1965	Day of Absence	St. Mark's Playhouse	Part of a program of two one-act plays with Happy Ending
1965	Happy Ending	St. Mark's Playhouse	Part of a program of two one-act plays with Day of Absence

=== Acting ===
Year	Production	Role	Theatre(s)	Notes
1983	Tigus	Tigus	Theatre Four	Part of a program of three one-act plays, entitled About Heaven and Earth
1975	The First Breeze of Summer	Harper Edwards	St. Mark's Playhouse	
1972	The River Niger	Johnny Williams	St. Mark's Playhouse; Brooks Atkinson Theatre	Obie Award, Distinguished Performance; Tony Award nomination, Best Featured Actor in a Play
1969	Ceremonies in Dark Old Men	Mr. Russell B. Parker	St. Mark's Playhouse	Drama Desk Award, Outstanding Performance
1959	A Raisin in the Sun	Moving Man; Bobo (understudy); Walter Lee Younger (understudy)	Ethel Barrymore Theatre; Belasco Theatre	

=== Awards and nominations ===
- 1966 Drama Desk Award for Happy Ending and Day of Absence
- 1968 Drama Desk Award (with Robert Hooks and Gerald S. Krone, Negro Ensemble Company)
- 1969 Drama Desk Award (Outstanding Performance) for Ceremonies in Dark Old Men
- 1969 Tony Award Special Award (with Robert Hooks and Gerald S. Krone, Negro Ensemble Company)
- 1974 Tony Award, Best Play (with Robert Hooks and Gerald S. Krone, Negro Ensemble Company) for The River Niger
- 1974 Tony Award nomination, Best Featured Actor in a Play for The River Niger
- 1976 Tony Award nomination, Best Play (with Robert Hooks and Gerald S. Krone, Negro Ensemble Company) for The First Breeze of Summer
- 1979 Drama Desk Award nomination, Outstanding New Play (with Robert Hooks and Gerald S. Krone, Negro Ensemble Company) for Nevis Mountain Dew
- 1982 Drama Desk Award nomination, Outstanding New Play (with Robert Hooks and Gerald S. Krone, Negro Ensemble Company) for A Soldier's Play
- 1982 Drama Desk Award nomination, Outstanding Director of a Play for A Soldier's Play
