= Melinda (film) =

1972 film by Hugh A. Robertson

- Theatrical release poster
- Directed by: Hugh A. Robertson
- Screenplay by: Lonne Elder III
- Story by: Raymond Cistheri
- Produced by: Pervis Atkins
- Starring: Calvin Lockhart; Rosalind Cash; Vonetta McGee; Paul Stevens; Rockne Tarkington; Ross Hagen
- Cinematography: Bill Butler
- Edited by: Paul L. Evans
- Music by: Jerry Butler; Jerry Peters
- Production company: Metro-Goldwyn-Mayer
- Distributed by: Metro-Goldwyn-Mayer
- Release date: August 16, 1972
- Running time: 109 minutes
- Country: United States
- Language: English

Melinda is a 1972 American drama film directed by Hugh A. Robertson and written by Lonne Elder III. The film stars Calvin Lockhart, Rosalind Cash, Vonetta McGee, Paul Stevens, Rockne Tarkington and Ross Hagen. The film was released on August 16, 1972, by Metro-Goldwyn-Mayer. This film marked karate champion Jim Kelly's first appearance in a film.

== Plot ==
Frankie J. Parker is a Los Angeles radio disc jockey. In his spare time, Frankie takes karate lessons at a school run by his friend Charles Atkins. A woman in a rental car, newly arrived from Chicago, listens to Frankie's radio program. They meet at a nightclub owned by another of Frankie's friends, former football player Tank Robertson, where she introduces herself as Melinda. He invites her to a party on Tank's yacht, making his girlfriend Terry Davis jealous. Frankie takes Melinda to his apartment, unaware that they are being followed by a thug. They make love and, the next morning, Melinda tells the womanizing, easy-going Frankie that he has the makings of a more serious, substantial man. After Frankie leaves for work, leaving Melinda alone in his apartment he begins to realize he has developed strong feelings for Melinda. When he returns home from work, he finds the apartment ransacked and Melinda murdered.

It turns out her real name is Audrey Miller and she is the former mistress of a Chicago gangster named Mitch, who is trying to recover a mysterious item Melinda took with her to LA. A junkie, Marcia, tries to take Frankie at gunpoint, but he overpowers her. Frankie is attacked by two men, but manages to fight them off, helped by his karate training, although Marcia ends up dead. Frankie finds out that his friend Tank is a business associate of Mitch and owes him money. The item Melinda took is in a safe-deposit box at the bank, the key to which Melinda mailed to Frankie before she died. Unable to gain entry himself, Frankie permits girlfriend Terry to impersonate Melinda and retrieve the item, which turns out to be a gold cigarette case.

Inside the case is a tape recording that incriminates Mitch in a crime. Terry is taken prisoner, forcing Frankie to agree to come to Mitch's mansion to work out a trade. He takes the precaution of asking Atkins and his karate students to come along. When they find Terry is being held in a snake-filled cage, Frankie, Atkins and the others come to her rescue. Frankie then holds Mitch at gun point as Mitch reveals that the tape can't incriminate him due to it being inaudible as it's a dirty tape. As Mitch laughs believing he is now scot free, Frankie goes into a rage, beating Mitch nearly to death for having Melinda killed. Once he stops, he and Terry kiss and embrace and walk over to his car.

== Cast ==
- Calvin Lockhart as Frankie J. Parker
- Rosalind Cash as Terry Davis
- Vonetta McGee as Audrey Miller / Melinda Lewis
- Paul Stevens as Mitch
- Rockne Tarkington as "Tank"
- Ross Hagen as Gregg Van
- Renny Roker as Dennis Smith
- Judyann Elder as Gloria
- Jim Kelly as Charles Atkins
- Jan Tice as Marcia
- Lonne Elder III as Lieutenant Daniels
- Edmund Cambridge as Detective
- George Fisher as Young Man
- Joe Hooker as Rome's Servant
- Allen Pinson as Rome
- Jack Manning as Bank Man
- Gene LeBell as Hood
- Gary Pagett as Sergeant Adams
- Khalil Bezaleel as Washington
- Nina Roman as Bank Woman
- Jeannie Bell as Jean
- Earl Maynard as Karate Group
- Dori Dixon as Karate Group
- Douglas C. Lawrence as Karate Group
- Evelyne Cuffee as Karate Group
- Peaches Jones as Karate Group

== See also ==
- List of American films of 1972
