= The River Niger =

1972 play by Joseph A. Walker

- Original language: English
- Written by: Joseph A. Walker
- Subject: A black family in Harlem
- Genre: Drama
- Setting: Harlem, New York, present day

Premiere
- Date: December 5, 1972
- Place: Negro Ensemble Company; St. Mark's Playhouse; New York City

The River Niger is a play by Joseph A. Walker, first performed by New York City's Negro Ensemble Company off-Broadway in 1972. The production made its Broadway debut with a transfer to the Brooks Atkinson Theatre on March 27, 1973, for a run of 162 performances.

Critically acclaimed, The River Niger won the Tony Award for Best Play in 1974, and was adapted into a film starring James Earl Jones and Cicely Tyson in 1976.

== Characters ==
- Mattie Williams
- Johnny Williams
- Dr. Dudley Stanton
- Jeff Williams
- Ann Vanderguild
- Big Moe Hayes
- Al
- Chips
- Skeeter
- Gail
- Wilhelmina Brown

== Adaptations ==
The play was adapted by Walker for film in 1976, directed by Krishna Shah starring Cicely Tyson and James Earl Jones.

== Awards and nominations ==
Awards

- 1973 Drama Desk Award for Most Promising Playwright – Joseph A. Walker
- 1973 Obie Award for Best American Play
- 1974 Tony Award for Best Play

Nominations

- 1974 Tony Award for Best Featured Actor in a Play – Douglas Turner Ward
- 1974 Tony Award for Best Featured Actress in a Play – Roxie Roker
