= Gertrude Greenidge =

American playwright

- Born: New York, USA
- Occupation: Playwright

Gertrude Greenidge was an American playwright. She wrote more than 30 plays, including Shadow of the Birch Tree (1963) and Ma Lou's Daughters (1974). She was a recipient of several awards, including the Lorraine Hansberry Best Play award and Richard Maibaum award.

== Personal life and career ==
Greenidge was born in New York, NY. She began writing in 1962 and was a member of the following New York theatre groups:

- Negro Ensemble Company Playwriters Workshop
- Frank Silvera Writers' Workshop
- Encore Players
- Harlem YMCA Little Theatre
- Adam Clayton Powell II Repertory Co
- Afro-American Total Theatre
- Franklin Thomas Little Theatre
- TAPS Community Theatre
- Paul Robeson Players in Brooklyn

=== Works ===
Greenidge wrote at least 30 plays, including:

- Incident in a Troubled Town (1962)
- Shadows of the Birch Tree (1963)
- Red Rain (1965)
- The Interrogator (1965)
- Pot-pourri (1965)
- Shadowplay (1966)
- Makin' It (1970) musical, with Hazel Bryant and Walter Miles
- Bricks (1971)
- Something for Jamie (1972) musical
- Snowman (1972)
- Laundry (1972)
- The Game (1972)
- The Wire (1973) screenplay
- Ma Lou's Daughters (1974)
- Twit (1974) musical with Maxwell Glanville
- Daughters (1975) play / ballet

=== Awards ===
Greenidge's play Shadows received the Best Play award from the Harlem YMCA Little Theatre in 1967 and the Literary Excellence award from the Paul Robeson Players in 1983. She also won the Lorraine Hansberry Best Play award, the National Endowment for the Arts/Theatre Communication Group Residency award, the National Endowment for the Arts award and the Richard Maibaum award.
