= Judyann Elder =

American actress

- Born: Judith Ann Johnson; August 18, 1948 (age 78); Cleveland, Ohio, U.S.
- Occupations: Actress; director; writer
- Years active: 1968–present
- Spouse: Lonne Elder III (m. 1969; div. 1994)
- Children: 2

Judyann Elder (born Judith Ann Johnson, August 18, 1948) is an American actress, director, and writer. She played Nadine Waters on the Fox sitcom Martin. She also played Harriette Winslow on CBS' Family Matters for the remaining eight episodes of its ninth and final season, after the departure of Jo Marie Payton. Elder is also a veteran of the stage who has appeared in scores of theatrical productions throughout the United States and Europe.

== Early life and career ==
A founding member and resident actor with the Tony Award-winning Negro Ensemble Company, Elder originated roles in the premier productions of The Song of the Lusitanian Bogey, Daddy Goodness, Kongi's Harvest, and God is a (Guess What?).

In 1969, she played the role of Russell B. Parker's young love interest in Lonne Elder III's Ceremonies in Dark Old Men and toured with the company to London and Rome. She married the play's Pulitzer Prize-nominated author early that same year, changing her name to Judyann Elder. Elder and her husband moved to Los Angeles soon after, where she broadened her career to include roles on screen. She had guest star roles in series such as The Streets of San Francisco, Sanford and Son, Wonder Woman, and The White Shadow. In 1976, she made her Broadway debut at the Ambassador Theatre as Coretta King opposite Billy Dee Williams in I Have a Dream, directed by Robert Greenwald. She subsequently portrayed the role of Bernette Wilson in the television miniseries A Woman Called Moses, starring Cicely Tyson. Several roles on screen followed, including Forget Paris with Billy Crystal, The Players Club directed by Ice Cube, and Seven Pounds with Will Smith.

In the 1991–92 season of TV's Murphy Brown starring Candice Bergen, Elder portrayed Murphy Brown's obstetrician, Dr. Barton. Her recurring role culminated with the historic season finale where Dr. Barton delivered Murphy Brown's baby. She played Gina's mother, Nadine Waters, on Martin (1992—97), starring Martin Lawrence; Gina was played by Tisha Campbell. In 1998, Elder replaced Jo Marie Payton as Harriette Winslow in the last episodes of the popular show Family Matters.

Elder has frequently returned to the stage, and last appeared at Arkansas Rep as Rose in August Wilson's Fences. She also has many theatre directorial credits, including The Book of the Crazy African (Skylight Theatre), The Meeting (Inner City Cultural Center, LA and New Federal Theatre, NY), Ceremonies in Dark Old Men (Beverly Canon Theatre), and A Private Act (Robey Theatre Company). Her direction of Matthew Lopez' The Whipping Man starring Charlie Robinson at the Skirball Cultural Center for LA Theatre Works radio series was broadcast nationally in 2016.

== Filmography ==
=== Film ===
Year	Title	Role	Notes
1972	Melinda	Gloria	
1973	Blume in Love	Lulu	
1978	A Woman Called Moses	Bernette Wilson	Television miniseries
1981	The Oklahoma City Dolls	Helen	Television movie
1982	In the Custody of Strangers	Marni Blake	Television movie
1987	Right to Die		Television movie
1989	Those She Left Behind	Counselor	Television movie
1995	Forget Paris	Ivy	
1997	Sweet Temptation	Teak	Television movie
1997	The Pest	Mrs. Kent	
1998	The Players Club	Mrs. Armstrong	
1998	Dead Man on Campus	Guidance Counselor	
2008	Seven Pounds	Holly	
2016	Viral	Mrs. Toomey	

=== As director ===
- 1989: Behind God's Back – short film (also narrator)
- 2013: A Private Act – short film (also screenplay)

=== Television ===
Year	Title	Role	Notes
1968	N.Y.P.D	Barmaid	Episode: "Deadly Circle of Violence"
1971	Owen Marshall: Counselor at Law		Episode: "Nothing Personal"
1972	Sanford and Son	Darlene Edwards	Episode: "A Pad for Lamont"
1973	The Streets of San Francisco	Vi Hoskin	Episode: "No Badge for Benjy"
1978	Wonder Woman	Marge	Episode: "Light-fingered Lady"
1978	Lou Grant	Mrs. Hatch	Episode: "Babies"
1979	The White Shadow	Dr. Chatton	Episode: "Me?"
1982	Today's F.B.I.		Episode: "Bank Job"
1982	Benson	Patty Stiles	Episode: "Quest for Retire"
1982	The Devlin Connection		Episode: "Allison"
1984	The Yellow Rose		Episode: "Land of the Free"
1984	Matt Houston	Ann Hoyt	Episode: Vanished"
1984	Webster	Irene Chambers	Episode: "Knock, Knock"
1985	V	Mrs. Caniff	Episode: "The Hero"
1985	St. Elsewhere	Elodie Haber	Episode: "Santa Clause is Dead"
1986	The Young and the Restless	Karen Olsen	6 episodes
1988	Amen	Sarah Crawford	Episode: "The Minister's Wife"
1989	Hard Time on Planet Earth	Mrs. Tillman	Episode: "All That You Can Be"
1989–1990	Paddington Bear	Additional Voices	2 episodes
1990	Star Trek: The Next Generation	Lt. Ballard	Episode: "The Offspring"
1990	Captain Planet and the Planeteers	Additional Voices	1 episode
1990	Midnight Patrol: Adventures in the Dream Zone	Voice	13 episodes
1991	Roc		Episode: "Pilot"
1991–1992	Murphy Brown	Dr. Barton	3 episodes
1992	The Powers That Be	Estelle	Episode: "How Sharper Than a Servant's Tooth"
1992–1997	Martin	Nadine Waters	6 episodes
1994	Beverly Hills, 90210	Nora Touissant	Episode: "Hate Is Just a Four Letter Word"
1994–1998	Family Matters	Sister Bernadette / Harriette Winslow	9 episodes
1996	In the House	Florence	Episode: "To Die For"
1996–1999	Mad About You	Nurse Lily	4 episodes
1997	The Steve Harvey Show	Ms. Crabtree	Episode: " I'm Not a Chauvinist, Piggy"
1998	Home Improvement	Diane Peck	Episode: "From Top to Bottom"
2001	Family Law	Judge	Episode: "The Quality of Mercy"
2001	Becker	Judge Miriam Reinhold	2 episodes
2002	First Monday	Darla Collins	Episode: "Court Date"
2003	Wanda at Large	Mrs. Hawkins	Episode: "Alma Mater"
2004	That's So Raven	Nana Loretta	Episode: "Leave It to Diva"
2005	ER	Debra Graham	Episode: "Refusal of Care"
2005	Blind Justice	Judy Dwyer	Episode: "In Your Face"
2006	NCIS	Marny Mathers	Episode: "Escaped"
2007	Desperate Housewives	Dr. Brody	Episode: "Gossip"
2008	Cold Case	Cecilia	Episode: "Sabotage"
2011	Love That Girl!	Phyliss	Episode: "Break of Dawn"
2012–2017	Family Time	Beverly Stallworth	10 episodes
2014	Castle	Melinda Parish	Episode: "Bad Santa"
2016	Grey's Anatomy	Angelica Paulson	Episode: "You’re Gonna Need Someone on Your Side"
