= Charles Weldon =

American actor, director, singer, and songwriter (1940–2018)

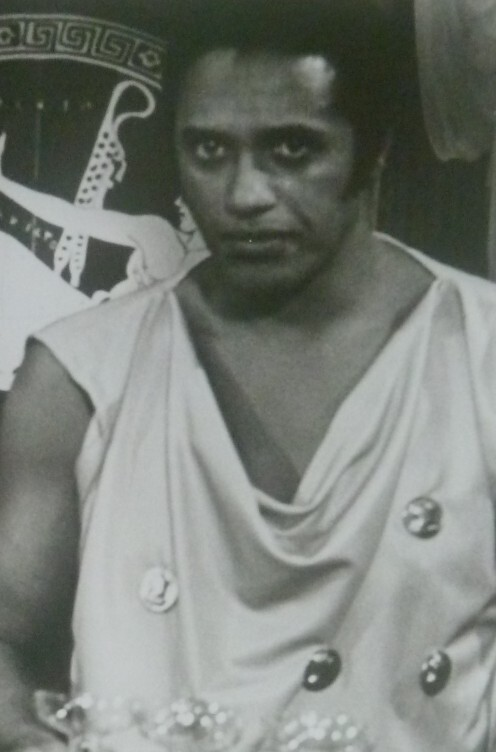
- Weldon in All That Glitters (1977)
- Born: June 1, 1940
- Died: December 7, 2018 (aged 78)
- Occupations: Actor; artistic director; singer; somgwriter
- Years active: 1959–2018

Charles Weldon (June 1, 1940 – December 7, 2018) was an American actor, director, educator, singer, and songwriter. He was an alumna of the Negro Ensemble Company and founder of the Negro Ensemble Company, Inc., serving as artistic director for thirteen years. He also directed many of their productions. During his career he worked with Denzel Washington, James Earl Jones, Cicely Tyson, Alfre Woodard, Muhammad Ali, and Oscar Brown Jr.

== Early years ==
Weldon's mother was Beatrice Jennings; his father was Roosevelt Weldon. The family moved from Wetumka, Oklahoma, to Bakersfield, California, when he was seven years old. As a young boy, he worked in the cotton fields of Bakersfield until the age of seventeen, when he joined a local doo-wop group. He graduated from Bakersfield High School in 1959. He was the brother of actress Ann Weldon, singer Maxine Weldon, and Mae Frances Weldon.

As the lead singer of The Paradons, he co-wrote the hit record "Diamonds and Pearls" in 1960. The group appeared on the Dick Clark's American Bandstand television show and also toured with James Brown and Fats Domino. After the group disbanded, Weldon joined the soul group Blues for Sale.

== Career ==
Weldon began his acting career in 1969, with a role in the Oscar Brown Jr.'s musical Big-Time Buck White starring as Muhammad Ali. He joined the original Negro Ensemble Company in 1970. After the NEC dissolved in 1993, Weldon founded the Negro Ensemble Company, Inc. in 2005, as a tribute to the company that fostered his early career, operating as artistic director.

In 1973, he was a part of the Broadway cast of The River Niger, with Cicely Tyson and James Earl Jones. The River Niger was written by Joseph A. Walker (playwright) and won a Tony Award for best play.

Weldon appeared in the original San Francisco production of Hair and directed and acted in many regional theaters. For the Denver Theater Center, he appeared in twelve productions. His last project was the short film Paris Blues in Harlem, which he co-produced and starred in with Nadhege Ptah and Michele Baldwin, who cast him in the project. Weldon starred in the role of the Jamaican Grim Reaper (the body-snatcher) in Sophia Romma's (playwright and Literary Manager of the Negro Ensemble Company, Inc. from 2012) allegorical satire, The Blacklist at the 13th Street Repertory Company in 2016.

=== Onscreen ===
- Stir Crazy
- Serpico
- Malcolm X
- The Wishing Tree

=== Negro Ensemble Company, Inc. Productions ===
- In 2016 - A Day of Absence by Douglas Turner Ward

=== Negro Ensemble Company, Inc. as Director ===
- Colored People Time, by Leslie Lee
- The Waiting Room by Samm-Art Williams
- Savanna Black and Blue by Raymond Jones
- Hercules Didn't Wade in the Water by Michael A. Jones
- Negro Ensemble Theater Companies 50th Anniversary revival of A Soldier's Play by Charles Fuller
- The Mire and With Aaron's Arms Around Me, by Sophia Romma at the Cherry Lane Theatre (2010)
- Cabaret Emigre, by Sophia Romma at the Lion Theatre (Theatre Row, 2012)

=== Castillo Theater ===
- 2011: Directed The Picture Box
- 2013: Directed Stealing Home about Jackie Robinson

=== As an actor ===
Filmography

- 1967: Who's Minding the Mint? - Guide (uncredited)
- 1972: Trick Baby - Tough
- 1975: Police Story (TV Series) - Stack / Harry Evans / James Reed
- 1975: Rooster Cogburn - Bailiff (uncredited)
- 1975: The Streets of San Francisco (TV Series) - J.W. Flowers
- 1976: Kojak (TV Series) - 'Shotgun Willie' Baine
- 1976: Dynasty (TV Movie) - Sam Adams
- 1976: The River Niger - Skeeter
- 1976: Kiss Me, Kill Me (TV Movie) - Leonard Hicks
- 1976: Sanford and Son (TV Series) - Miss Wallace / Alex Hacker
- 1978: A Woman Called Moses (TV Series) - Shadrack Davis
- 1979: The Rockford Files (TV Series) - Watkins
- 1979: Roots: The Next Generations (TV Mini-Series) - Doxey Walker
- 1980: Stir Crazy
- 1981-1982: Hill Street Blues (TV Series) - Connelly / Lt. Clayton Shaw
- 1982: American Playhouse (TV Series) - Beau Willie
- 1982: Fast-Walking - Officer Jackson
- 1983: Another Woman's Child (TV Movie) - Roland
- 1984: Gimme a Break! (TV Series) - Good Ol' Charlie Johnson
- 1985: The Atlanta Child Murders (TV Mini-Series) - John Bell
- 1985: St. Elsewhere (TV Series) - Andrew Turner
- 1986: L.A. Law (TV Series) - Cop #1
- 1987: Simon & Simon (TV Series) - Doug Belton
- 1988: Case Closed (TV Movie)
- 1989: The Women of Brewster Place (TV Series) - Tenant #5
- 1990-1999: Law & Order (TV Series)
- 1992: Malcolm X - Follower at Temple #7
- 1994: Drop Squad - Uncle Omar
- 1994: New York Undercover (TV Series) - James Hampton / Croupier
- 1999: The Wishing Tree - Al 'Alfred' Brooks
- 2000: Clockin' Green (Video) - Al 'Alfred' Brooks
- 2001: Hoop Soldiers (Video)
- 2005: Law & Order: Trial by Jury (TV Series) - Juror #2
- 2018: Diane - Tom
- 2018: Paris Blues in Harlem (Short) - Pop Pop (final film role)

== Awards ==
- Henry Award for Excellence in Regional Theater for Best Supporting Actor in Gem of the Ocean by August Wilson
- AUDELCO Award for Best Supporting Actor in Seven Guitars by August Wilson
