= David Downing (actor) =

American actor (1943-2017)

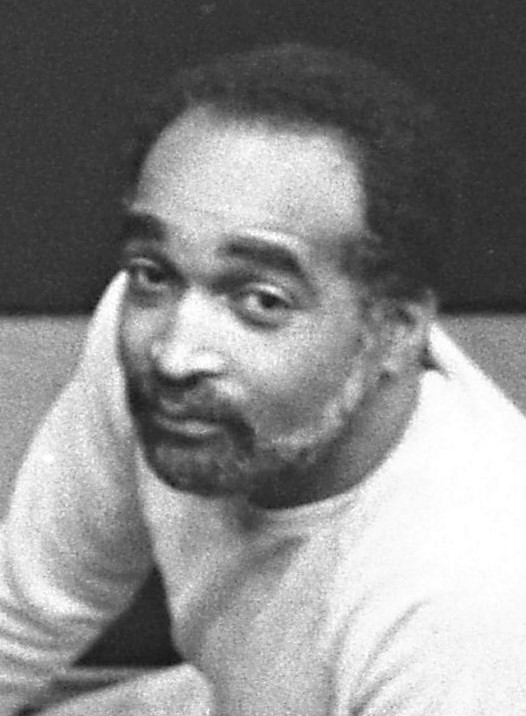
- Downing in 1986
- Born: July 21, 1943; New York, New York
- Died: November 1, 2017 (aged 74); Los Angeles, California
- Occupation: Actor

David Downing was an American stage, film, and television actor. He was one of the original members of the Negro Ensemble Company in New York City.

Downing, a native of Harlem, New York City, attended the High School of Performing Arts. As a child actor, he made his professional debut on Broadway in The Green Pastures. He served a tour of duty with the U.S. Armed Forces in Okinawa.

As part of the Negro Ensemble Company in the 1960s and 70s, Downing appeared in productions including the Obie Award-winning musical The Great MacDaddy, and the successful play Ceremonies in Dark Old Men. Downing later appeared in the Pulitzer Prize-nominated play, Miss Evers' Boys.

Downing appeared in films, including Gordon's War, and numerous television shows, including The Jeffersons, Baretta, Backstairs at the White House, and Fresh Prince of Bel-Air.

Downing died in Los Angeles on November 1, 2017, at the age of 74.

== Filmography (selected) ==
=== Film ===
Year	Title	Role	Notes
1971	Been Down So Long It Looks Like Up to Me	Heff	
1972	Up the Sandbox	John	
1973	Gordon's War	Otis Russell	
1978	Coming Attractions	'Dark Town' Singer	
1989	Listen to Me	Officer of the Court	
2006	Circus Camp	Jamaica Joe	

=== Television ===
Year	Title	Role	Notes
2005	The Bernie Mac Show	Father	Episode: Prison Break
1998	JAG	Chaplain	Episode: With Intent to Die
1992-1993	Roc	Dr. Brown / Uncle Warren	Two episodes
1991	Cast a Deadly Spell	Thadius Pilgrim	TV movie
1990-1991	The Fresh Prince of Bel-Air	Reverend White / Presenter	Two episodes
1989	227	Father Gabbay / Walter	Two episodes
1988	Meet the Raisins!	Red	Voice, TV special
1987	Designing Women	Sam	Episode: Anthony Jr.
1983	Hill Street Blues	Chester David	Episode: Moon Over Uranus: The Sequel
1982	Father Murphy	Marcus Washington	Episode: The Dream Day
1979-1982	The Jeffersons	Edgar Thornton / Albert Fox	Three episodes
1979	Backstairs at the White House	Butler Dixon	TV miniseries
1978	Ziegfeld: The Man and His Women	Bert Williams	TV movie
1977	Little House on the Prairie	Jackson Henry	Episode: The Wisdom of Solomon
1977	What's Happening!!	Mr. Barnes	Episode: The Firing Squad
1976	All in the Family	John Kasten	Episode: Mike's Move
1976	Baretta	Sully	Episode: Count the Days I'm Gone
1975	That's My Mama	Quincy	Episode: Queen of the Ribs
1975	Movin' On	Lee Andrews	Episode: ...To Be in Carolina
