= David Downing (footballer) =

English footballer

Personal information
- Full name: David William Downing
- Date of birth: 6 October 1969 (age 57)
- Place of birth: Bideford, Devon, England
- Position: Striker

Youth career
- –1988: York City

Senior career*
Years	Team	Apps	(Gls)
1988–1989	York City	1	(0)
- Goole Town
Total		1+	(0+)
- * Club domestic league appearances and goals

David William Downing (born 6 October 1969) is an English former professional footballer who played as a striker in the Football League for York City, and in non-League football| for Goole Town.
