= Edith Oliver =

American drama critic (1913–1998)

Edith Oliver (August 9, 1913 – February 23, 1998) was an American theater and film critic who contributed to The New Yorker magazine from 1947 to 1993. Before that, she wrote several radio quiz shows, including Take It or Leave It: the $64 Question, which she also produced. She is best known for her coverage of, and support for, Off-Broadway theater. In 1996 she was presented with the Lucille Lortel award for “Lifetime Dedication to Off-Broadway” by the Off-Broadway League.

Oliver was a staunch supporter of emerging playwrights. She spent 20 summers (1975–1995) advising playwrights on their works-in-process in her role as a dramaturge at the National Playwrights Conference at the Eugene O'Neill Theater Center in Waterford, Connecticut. The Conference’s founder, George White, described her this way, "She was packaged like the quintessential elderly lady that a Boy Scout would help across the street, except that she drank martinis, smoked cigarettes and could, on occasion, have a mouth like a sailor. She could be tough and would brook no banality, but she truly loved playwrights and loved the theater."

== Early life and career ==
Edith Oliver (née Goldsmith) was born in New York City in 1913, to Sam Goldsmith (a wool broker) and his wife Maude Goldsmith. She described her family (which included a younger brother, Robert) as “stage struck.” She attended Smith College but did not graduate. She studied acting privately with the famous English actress Mrs. Patrick Campbell and worked as an apprentice at the Stockbridge Playhouse in Stockbridge, MA. She was a fan of the novelist, poet and playwright Oliver Goldsmith, and began using the name Edith Oliver, first as a nom de plume at Smith and then as a stage name in her early 20s. She went by Oliver for the rest of her life.

An aspiring stage actress, she landed small parts in radio plays that included Gangbusters, Crime Doctor and the Philip Morris Playhouse. In 1937 she began writing questions for the radio quiz show “True or False?”. In 1940 she began writing for “Take It or Leave It: The $64 Question,” for CBS radio and then NBC. She later became the producer of the program.

== Theater critic at the New Yorker magazine ==
Oliver began working part-time for The New Yorker magazine in 1947, as a nonfiction reader and editor in the book review department, while continuing one day a week as a casting director for the Biow [advertising] Agency. During the 1950s, she wrote short pieces and book reviews for the magazine that ran without a by-line, as was customary. In 1961 she officially joined the staff. She reviewed movies for five years, and then theater for 32 years—mostly off-Broadway, but sometimes Broadway as well—while continuing to run the magazine’s book department. Unlike many other New Yorker writers, she did not write profiles, publish anthologies of her reviews, or write other books.

Known for her toughness and love of theater, Oliver came to be “among the most influential voices covering off Broadway theater.” She was “an astute and open minded reviewer who was the first to recognize and champion such playwrights as David Mamet, Christopher Durang, and Wendy Wasserstein.” Playwright Thornton Wilder wrote to her, “Your immense usefulness did not proceed from your ‘championing’ the new theater, beating the drum, ‘torch-bearing’, but simply from your writing so well, – quietly, firmly, faithfully reporting what you saw. There is no persuasion equal to that fidelity.”

Playwright Edward Albee said of her: “She was tough, she was honest, and she didn't write her reviews before she saw the play. She had an agenda—all critics have an agenda—but hers was really quite simple, I think. If you were any good at all as a playwright, if you were honest, if you were tough, and you realized that a play had to be more than decorative, and have something to say, not matter how badly you said it, she was on your side.... Woe onto you if you consciously did less than she knew you were capable of.”

She tried to be kind to actors: “I have the greatest sympathy for actors and their problems,” she once told an interviewer. “They don’t need me to add to their burden.”

== A time of change and growth in American theater ==
In the 1960s and ‘70s theatrical experimentation was burgeoning. Oliver was an astute witness and commentator. According to Lloyd Richards, former Artistic Director of the O’Neill Playwrights Conference: “Off Broadway and Off Off Broadway were finding out what they were by doing what they did. And Edith Oliver was there helping to define them, through caring, through being there when few others came, by writing about them and revealing themselves to themselves. Her words helped to shape the Off Broadway Movement."

By covering theatrical companies like the Negro Ensemble Company, Café La Mama and the New Federal Theater, she provided them with visibility and support they would not have had otherwise. “Off Broadway was the love of my life,” she said. “I was young enough to be all over town, four or five nights a week. The thrill was Harlem in the 60’s... “

== Awards, honors and memorials ==
- 1994. The Eugene O’Neill Playwrights’ Conference announced the Edith Oliver Fellow award, to be presented annually to the Conference playwright who “in the spirit of Edith Oliver, best displays a caustic wit that deflates the ego but does not unduly damage the human spirit.”
- 1996. Oliver received the Lucille Lortel award for “Lifetime Dedication to Off-Broadway” by the Off-Broadway League.
- 1998. The Lucille Lortel Foundation established the “Edith Oliver Award for Sustained Excellence” which was presented to one individual each year through 2003: Eli Wallach, Jerry Orbach, Barry Grove, Lanford Wilson, Ruby Dee and Marian Seldes.
- 1998. The Eugene O’Neill Playwrights’ Conference renamed their outdoor theater after her; it became known as “The Edith”
- The O'Neill Theater Center's National Critics Institute, directed by Dan Sullivan, awards a full scholarship to "a young critic, preferably female, whose copy reflects some of the shrewdness and kindness that marked every Edith Oliver review."
