= A Soldier's Story =

1984 film by Norman Jewison

- Theatrical release poster
- Directed by: Norman Jewison
- Screenplay by: Charles Fuller
- Based on: A Soldier's Play (1981 play) by Charles Fuller
- Produced by: Norman Jewison; Patrick Palmer; Ronald L. Schwary
- Starring: Howard E. Rollins, Jr.; Adolph Caesar
- Cinematography: Russell Boyd
- Edited by: Caroline Biggerstaff; Mark Warner
- Music by: Herbie Hancock
- Production company: Columbia Pictures
- Distributed by: Columbia Pictures
- Release date: September 14, 1984
- Running time: 101 minutes
- Country: United States
- Language: English
- Budget: $6 million
- Box office: $21,821,347

A Soldier's Story is a 1984 American mystery drama film directed and produced by Norman Jewison, adapted by Charles Fuller from his Pulitzer Prize-winning A Soldier's Play. It is a murder mystery set in a segregated regiment of the U.S Army commanded by White officers and training in the Jim Crow South. In a time and place where a Black commissioned officer is bitterly resented by nearly everyone, a Black JAG captain investigates the murder of a Black drill sergeant in Louisiana following American entry into World War II. As the investigation proceeds, the events leading up to the sergeant's murder are shown in flashbacks.

The cast is led by Howard Rollins and Adolph Caesar. Other actors include Art Evans, David Alan Grier, Larry Riley, David Harris, Robert Townsend, and Patti LaBelle. Denzel Washington, still at the beginning of his career, appears in a supporting role. Several actors reprise their roles from the stage version.

The film premiered at the 1984 Toronto International Film Festival and was both a critical and commercial success. It received three Academy Award nominations: Best Picture, Best Adapted Screenplay and Best Supporting Actor for Adolph Caesar. The film was ranked by the National Board of Review as one of the 10 best films of 1984, and it won the Golden Prize at the 14th Moscow International Film Festival.

== Plot ==
In 1944 during World War II, Vernon Waters, a master sergeant in a company of Black soldiers, is shot to death with a .45 caliber pistol outside Fort Neal, a segregated Army base in Louisiana. Captain Richard Davenport, a Black officer from the Judge Advocate General's Corps, is sent to investigate. Most assume Waters was killed by the local Ku Klux Klan, but others are doubtful.

Even Captain Taylor, the only White officer who wants the killers prosecuted, is uncooperative and patronizing, fearing a Black officer will have little success. Davenport soon discovers that whenever the Klan murders Black soldiers, they strip them of their military insignia, whereas the body of Sgt. Waters was found wearing an intact uniform.

Davenport learns that Waters's company was officially part of the 221st Chemical Smoke Generator Battalion. They are kept on the Home Front and assigned menial jobs. Most are former baseball players from the Negro leagues, grouped to play ball with Waters as manager.

Private James Wilkie, a former sergeant Waters busted for being drunk on duty, describes Waters as a combat veteran who was awarded with the Croix de Guerre by the Third French Republic during the First World War. He also says that Waters was a strict disciplinarian but a fair non-commissioned officer (NCO) who interacted well with his men, especially baseball pitcher and jazz musician C.J. Memphis.

Private Peterson reveals Waters's tyrannical nature and his disgust with Black soldiers from the rural South who lacked education or who spoke in Gullah language. Peterson recalls how he thrashed Waters when the sergeant berated the men after a winning game. Interviewing other soldiers, Davenport learns that Waters charged Memphis with the murder of a White MP after a search conducted by Wilkie turned up a recently discharged pistol under his bunk. Waters provoked Memphis into hitting him, and while the murder charge was dismissed, Memphis was charged with striking a superior officer.

Davenport interrogates Memphis's best friend, Corporal Bernard Cobb. Cobb recalls visiting Memphis in the brig, where he told Cobb of a visit in which Waters admitted the planted gun was part of a frame-up. Waters viewed "Geechees", as he termed uneducated southern Blacks like Memphis, as an obstacle to racial equality and the success of the future African American upper class. Davenport also learns from Cobb that Memphis, who suffered from claustrophobia, hanged himself while awaiting his court-martial. In protest, the baseball team threw the season's last game. Taylor disbanded the team, and the players were reassigned to the 221st.

Davenport learns that racist White officers, Captain Wilcox and Lieutenant Byrd, had an altercation with Waters shortly before his death. While being interrogated by Davenport and Taylor at the officer's club, Wilcox and Byrd admit to assaulting a guilt-ridden Waters after he confronted them in a drunken tirade. They admit that they would have killed him, but only men on guard duty are issued .45 ammunition when the unit is on bivouac. Immediately after learning of Waters's murder, both officers turned in their sidearms, and ballistics testing cleared them.

Davenport interrogates Wilkie, who admits he planted the gun under Memphis's bunk on Waters's orders. Wilkie also reveals that Waters had told him the real reasons for his hatred of Gullah-speaking southern Blacks like Memphis. While serving with the American Expeditionary Forces (AEF) in France during World War I, a Black soldier in Waters's unit had, at the urging of racist White doughboys, humiliated them all by dressing up and acting like a monkey in front of French women at a cabaret. In retaliation, Waters and his enraged fellow Black doughboys slit the soldier's throat.

Davenport demands to know why Waters did not also frame Peterson after their fight. Wilkie explains that Waters liked Peterson, as he spoke proper English and stood up for himself. Davenport has Wilkie arrested just as the 221st is about to be shipped out to join the fight overseas.

Realizing Peterson and Smalls were on guard duty the night of the murder and thus had been issued .45 ammunition, Davenport interrogates Smalls. He confesses to watching as Peterson fatally shot Waters, claiming it was "justice" for Memphis and for all Black people.

Taylor congratulates Davenport on the arrests of Wilkie, Peterson, and Smalls, admitting that he will have to become accustomed to Negroes being commissioned officers. Meanwhile, the platoon marches in preparation for their deployment to the European theater of war.

== Cast ==
- Howard E. Rollins Jr. as CPT. Richard Davenport
- Adolph Caesar as MSG. Vernon Waters
- Art Evans as PVT. James Wilkie
- David Alan Grier as CPL. Bernard Cobb
- David Harris as PVT. Tony Smalls
- Denzel Washington as PFC. Melvin Peterson
- Dennis Lipscomb as CPT. Charles Taylor
- Larry Riley as PVT. C.J. Memphis
- Robert Townsend as CPL. Ellis
- William Allen Young as PVT. Henson
- John Hancock as SGT. Washington
- Patti LaBelle as Big Mary
- Trey Wilson as COL. Nivens
- Wings Hauser as LT. Byrd
- Scott Paulin as CPT. Wilcox
- Mike Williams as PFC. Oscar
- Bob Swanson as boy on raft

== Production ==
Jewison and many of the cast members worked for scale or less under a tight budget with Columbia Pictures. "No one really wanted to make this movie... a black story, it was based on World War II, and those themes were not popular at the box office", according to Jewison. Warner Bros. turned it down, as did Universal and Metro-Goldwyn-Mayer. Columbia's Frank Price read the screenplay and was deeply interested, but the studio was hesitant about its commercial value, so Jewison offered to do the film for a $5 million budget and no salary. When the Directors Guild of America insisted he must have a fee, he agreed to take the lowest possible amount. The film ended up grossing $22.1 million.

Howard E. Rollins, Jr. had just received an Oscar nomination for his role in Ragtime and was cast as the lead. Most of the cast came from Broadway careers, but only Adolph Caesar, Denzel Washington, Larry Riley and William Allen Young appeared in both the movie and the original off-Broadway play with the Negro Ensemble Company in the New York City version.

In a 1985 interview with the Los Angeles Times, Caesar stated, while crafting the character of Waters, he drew on his frustrating experiences with both racism and ignorance in Classical theatre, "I’d studied Shakespeare to death. I knew more about Shakespeare than Shakespeare knew about himself. After I did one season at a Shakespearean repertory company, a director said to me, ‘You have a marvelous voice. You know the king’s English well. You speak iambic pentameter. My suggestion is that you go to New York and get a good colored role.' Waters has tried his best, but no matter what you do, they still hate you."

A Soldier's Story was shot entirely in Arkansas. The "Tynin" exterior scenes were shot in three days in Clarendon. The baseball sequence was filmed in Little Rock at the historic Lamar Porter Field.

Bill Clinton (then Governor of Arkansas) dropped by during the shooting. He became enthusiastic about the project and later helped by providing the Arkansas Army National Guard in full regalia for a grand scene, since Jewison could not afford to pay an army of extras. Production was completed with their help at Fort Chaffee United States Army Ready Reserve base at Fort Smith.

Fuller had said Herman Melville's novella Billy Budd inspired the play.

== Reception ==
The film holds a 91% rating on Rotten Tomatoes from a sample of 22 critics. The site's consensus reads, "A meticulously crafted murder mystery with incisive observations about race in America, A Soldier's Story benefits from a roundly excellent ensemble and Charles Fuller's politically urgent screenplay". Metacritic, which uses a weighted average, assigned the film a score of 66 out of 100, based on 10 critics, indicating "generally favorable" reviews.

== Legacy ==
Waters's "day of the Geechie" speech has been referenced in hip hop. Dialogue from the speech appears at the beginning of Immortal Technique's 2003 song "Industrial Revolution", from Revolutionary Vol. 2. Rapper K-Hill cited Waters's speech as the inspiration for his song "The Geechi's Over", applying the film's discussion of stereotypes about Southern Black people to stereotypes surrounding Southern hip hop.

The film has been noted as one of only two Best Picture nominees to feature Denzel Washington, along with Fences.

=== Awards and nominations ===
Institution	Year	Category	Nominee	Result
Academy Awards	1985	Best Picture	Norman Jewison	Nominated
Academy Awards	1985	Best Adapted Screenplay	Charles Fuller	Nominated
Academy Awards	1985	Best Supporting Actor	Adolph Caesar	Nominated
Casting Society of America	1985	Best Casting in a Feature Film	Reuben Cannon	Nominated
Directors Guild of America	1985	Outstanding Directing – Feature Film	Norman Jewison	Nominated
Edgar Award	1985	Best Motion Picture Screenplay	Charles Fuller	Won
Golden Globe Awards	1985	Best Motion Picture – Drama	—N/a	Nominated
Golden Globe Awards	1985	Best Screenplay	Charles Fuller	Nominated
Golden Globe Awards	1985	Best Supporting Actor – Motion Picture	Adolph Caesar	Nominated
Los Angeles Film Critics Association	1984	Best Supporting Actor	Adolph Caesar	Won
NAACP Image Awards	1985	Outstanding Motion Picture	—N/a	Won
NAACP Image Awards	1985	Outstanding Actor in a Motion Picture	Adolph Caesar	Won
National Board of Review	1984	Top Ten Films	—N/a	Won
Moscow International Film Festival	1985	Golden Prize	Norman Jewison	Won
Writers Guild of America	1985	Best Adapted Screenplay	Charles Fuller	Nominated
