= W. McNeil Lowry =

American businessman

- Born: Wilson McNeil Lowry; February 17, 1913
- Died: June 6, 1993 (aged 80); Manhattan, New York, U.S.
- Occupation: Businessman

Wilson McNeil Lowry (February 17, 1913 – June 6, 1993) was an American businessman. He served as the vice president of the Ford Foundation. Lowry was honored the Special Tony Award at the 17th Tony Awards. He died in June 1993 of esophageal cancer at his home in Manhattan, New York, at the age of 80.
