= Negro Ensemble Company =

New York City-based theatre company

- Formation: 1967
- Dissolved: 1993
- Type: Theatre group
- Location: New York City, New York, United States
- Notable members: Debbie Allen, John Amos, Angela Bassett, Avery Brooks, Roscoe Lee Browne, Adolph Caesar, Rosalind Cash, Keith David, Bill Duke, Judyann Elder, Giancarlo Esposito, Laurence Fishburne, Danny Glover, Louis Gossett Jr., David Alan Grier, Moses Gunn, Julius Harris, Sherman Hemsley, Kevin Hooks, Samuel L. Jackson, Eugene Lee, Cleavon Little, Delroy Lindo, S. Epatha Merkerson, Garrett Morris, Denise Nicholas, Ron O'Neal, Sheryl Lee Ralph, Phylicia Rashad, Esther Rolle, Richard Roundtree, Clarice Taylor, Glynn Turman, Denzel Washington, Charles Weldon, Lynn Whitfield, Dick Anthony Williams, Samm-Art Williams, Victor Willis, Hattie Winston

The Negro Ensemble Company (NEC) was a New York City-based theater company and workshop established in 1967 by producer-actor Robert Hooks, playwright Douglas Turner Ward, and theater manager Gerald S. Krone, with funding from the Ford Foundation. The company's focus on original works with themes based in the black experience with an international perspective created a canon of theatrical works and an audience for writers who came later, such as August Wilson, Suzan-Lori Parks, and others.

== Beginnings ==
The Negro Ensemble Company was created in 1964 when Hooks created a tuition-free acting workshop for urban youth which he named the Group Theatre Workshop (GTW), in tribute to Harold Clurman's The Group Theatre. The group became a refuge for young minority actors, with a focus on black theatre. He and his associate Barbara Ann Teer produced in a one-night showcase for friends and family of the actors. The plays chosen were Gwendolyn Brooks's We Real Cool and Douglas Turner Ward's Happy Ending.

Jerry Tallmer, reviewer for the New York Post, happened to attend this showcase and gave it a glowing review. This inspired Hooks to produce Happy Ending and Ward's Day of Absence as a double bill presented by Robert Hooks Productions. After raising $35,000 from music executives Clarence Avant and Al Bell, Hooks booked the St. Mark's Playhouse (where many black performers had performed in the long-running show, The Blacks) and hired Gerald Krone as company manager.

Ward was invited by the New York Times to write an opinion piece for its Sunday edition on the state of black theatre. His piece, "American Theatre: For Whites Only?", published in August 1966, was a scathing indictment of America's theatre establishment and posited the need for a unique black theatre institution. This article caused McNeil Lowery of the Ford Foundation contact Ward to set up a meeting with Ward, Hooks, and Krone. Invited to present a proposal, they came with a bid for an ensemble company much like Bertolt Brecht's Berliner Ensemble. The concept of a true ensemble company (a nucleus of actors performing a roster of plays back-to-back within each season) was uncommon in American theatre. A theatre based on the black experience, created and staffed by black artists, was even more of a departure. In the legacy of the Group Theatre Workshop, this new theatre incorporated a workshop providing tuition-free acting, directing, writing, and theatre administration instruction, which was intended to raise a new generation of theatre professionals. The proposal was accepted and they were awarded a three-year, $1.5 million grant to establish the company.

=== Early controversy ===
From the beginning, they resisted demands that the new company be located in Harlem and instead, sought out a space downtown where they could build on the existing theatre audience while cultivating an informed black theatre-going audience that hadn't previously existed on a significant scale. They chose the St. Mark's Playhouse primarily because of its flexible configuration.

During this era of Black Power, the decision to use the term "Negro", rather than the more current "Black", was controversial. The name was intended as a tribute to the Harlem Renaissance and the legacy of its artists (Langston Hughes, Zora Neal Hurston, Countee Cullen, Jessie Fauset, Claude McKay, Ethel Waters, etc.), some of whom were still alive and living in New York at the time. The term "New Negro", made popular by philosopher and journalist Alain Locke, was used during the Harlem Renaissance to invoke an outspoken advocacy of dignity and a refusal to submit to the practices and laws of Jim Crow.

Krone, who was serving as administrative director for the company, was Caucasian, which caused some vocal protest from black nationalists.

== History ==
=== Founding ===
When introducing the Negro Ensemble Company, the three founders wanted to inform New York and the world that they were not "an exclusionary... but an inclusive... black theatre; an arts institution dedicated to discovering, nurturing and expanding a theatrical exploration of what it was to be black within a 'world view' perspective." Part of this approach was to acknowledge that playwrights of many races, ethnicities, and nationalities had been, and currently, were writing about the experiences of Africans and African Americans, and about colonialism.

=== 1967–1971 ===
The first repertory season, 1967–1968, was not without controversy. The company presented Summer of the Seventeenth Doll by Australian playwright Ray Lawler; Kongi's Harvest by Nigerian playwright Wole Soyinka, Daddy Goodness by Richard Wright, and as their first play, Song of the Lusitanian Bogey by Swedish-German playwright Peter Weiss. The Weiss play addresses the oppression of black people from an international perspective, set in colonized Angola. Some black activists protested, accusing NEC of taking "white money" and for producing the work of a white playwright. On one occasion, activists attempted to storm the theatre during a performance of the Weiss play. Soon afterward, the NEC production of Song of the Lusitanian Bogey in London created further controversy, where the company was heckled by right-wing protesters who resented the play's anti-imperialist message. Many of the plays produced by the Negro Ensemble Company dealt with complex, sometimes disturbing, and often ignored aspects of the black experience and the American experience. The company's nurturing of black playwrights (such as Lonne Elder III with Ceremonies in Dark Old Men and Charles Fuller with Zooman and The Sign) over four decades contributed to the body of plays and performance literature that form the backbone of the African-American theatrical canon.

=== 1972–1979 ===
While the company often received glowing reviews, had sold-out audiences, and was producing some of the critically acclaimed theatre of the era, the early 1970s found the Negro Ensemble Company in financial trouble. The 145-seat theatre had become too small to generate the revenue needed for its ambitious projects. During the 1972-73 season, the resident company was disbanded, staff was cut, workshops were cancelled, and salaries were deferred. The decision was made to produce only one new play per year.

The play chosen that year was The River Niger by Joseph A. Walker. A poetic play set in Harlem during the turbulent racial redefining of the 1970s, the work depicts the struggles of a proud black family divided between the past and the future. This was the first NEC production to transfer to Broadway, where it ran for nine months, won a Tony Award for Best Play, and embarked on a national tour. This helped to ensure the continued existence of the NEC.

=== 1980s ===
In July 1980, the NEC relocated to a new 299-seat home at Theatre Four at 424 West 55th Street, where it would remain until 1991. In 1981, the NEC presented what would be its most successful production. A Soldier's Play by Charles Fuller is the story of the murder of a black soldier on a Southern army base during World War II, and the subsequent investigation by a black army captain. It examines black pride and black self-hatred, and won both the Pulitzer Prize and the New York Drama Critics Circle Best Play awards. The original cast included Adolph Caesar, Denzel Washington, Samuel L. Jackson, Brent Jennings, Steven Anthony Jones, Charles Brown, Larry Riley, Peter Friedman, Cotter Smith, James Pickens Jr., Eugene Lee, and Stephen Zettler. In 1984, it was made into a movie, featuring several original cast members and NEC alumni (notably Adolph Caesar, Denzel Washington, and David Alan Grier). The film of A Soldier's Story was nominated for three Academy Awards.

=== Dissolution and NEC, Inc. controversy ===
In 1993, the Negro Ensemble Company's board voted to dissolve the company. In 2005, a restructured company was founded by alumna Charles Weldon as Artistic Director, under the banner of the Negro Ensemble Company, Inc. However, Weldon's entity was unrelated to the original institution or their members, operating without the involvement of Hooks, Krone, and Ward. In 2017, due to ongoing reckless misrepresentation, co-founder Douglas Turner Ward publicly disavowed the Negro Ensemble Company, Inc. in an open letter. Robert Hooks, the last surviving co-founder, has also withdrawn support for the tribute company and its attempts to trade on the NEC's storied legacy.

== Major awards ==
Pulitzer Prize for Drama

- 1982 – A Soldier’s Play

Tony Awards

- 1969 – Special Achievement
- 1973 – The River Niger

Obie Awards

- 1968 – Citation for Excellence
- 1971 – Dream on Monkey Mountain
- 1973 – The River Niger
- 1974 – The Great McDaddy
- 1975 – The First Breeze of Summer
- 1977 – Eden
- 1979 – Nevis Mountain Dew
- 1980 – Lagrima del Diablo
- 1981 – Zooman and The Sign
- 1981 – Sustained Achievement
- 1982 – A Soldier’s Play

Vernon Rice Drama Desk Award

- 1968 – Negro Ensemble Company
- 1969 – Ceremonies in Dark Old Men
- 1972 – Sty of the Blind Pig
- 1973 – The River Niger

Dramatists Guild Award

- 1976 – The First Breeze of Summer
- 1982 – A Soldier’s Play

New York Drama Critics’ Circle Award

- 1982 – A Soldier’s Play

American Theatre Wing Award

- 1983 – Negro Ensemble Company

Clarence Derwent Awards

- 1976 – The First Breeze of Summer
- 1982 – A Soldier’s Play

Audelco Award

- 1977 – Eden
- 1980 – Home

Margo Jones Award

- 1975 – The First Breeze of Summer

Outer Critics Circle Awards

- 1980 – Home
- 1982 – A Soldier’s Play

Eudora Welty Television Award

- 1978 – The First Breeze of Summer

James A. Vaughn Award for Excellence in American Theatre

- 1980 – Negro Ensemble Company

Premio Roma Award

- 1969 – Song of the Lusitanian Bogey

Manhattan Theatre Club Award

- 1982 – A Soldier’s Play

Brandeis University Creative Award

- 1970 – Negro Ensemble Company

New York State Arts Council Award

- 1976 – Negro Ensemble Company

Bronze Medallion of New York City

- 1977 – Negro Ensemble Company

New England Theatre Conference Special Award

- 1981 – Negro Ensemble Company

== Original company ==
- Norman Bush
- Rosalind Cash
- David Downing
- Frances Foster
- Arthur French
- Moses Gunn
- William Jay
- Judyann (Jonsson) Elder
- Denise Nicholas
- Esther Rolle
- Clarice Taylor
- Hattie Winston
- Allie Woods
- Production Stage Manager: Edmund Cambridge
- Stage Managers: Horacena J. Taylor, James S. Lucas, ‘Femi Sarah Heggie

== Original staff ==
- Acting: Paul Mann, Lloyd Richards, Ron Mack, Luther James, Edmund Cambridge
- Directing: Michael A. Schultz
- Playwriting: Lonne Elder III, Steve Carter, Gus Edwards
- Set design: Edward Burbridge
- Costuming: Gertha Brock
- Dance/choreography: Louis Johnson, Talley Beatty
- Vocal coach (for actors): Kristin Linklater
- Singing coach: Margaret Harris
- Theatre administration: Gerald S. Krone, Carolyn Jones, Fred Garrett

== Notable alumni ==
- David Ackroyd
- Mary Alice
- Debbie Allen
- John Amos
- Ethel Ayler
- Angela Bassett
- Paul Benjamin
- Earl Billings
- Avery Brooks
- Charles Brown
- Graham Brown
- Roscoe Lee Browne
- Arthur Burghardt
- Adolph Caesar
- L. Scott Caldwell
- Edmund Cambridge
- Godfrey Cambridge
- Rosalind Cash
- Anthony Chisholm
- Bill Cobbs
- Dwight Cook
- Lawrence Cook
- Keith David
- Yaya DaCosta
- David Downing
- Bill Duke
- O. L. Duke
- Judyann Elder
- Giancarlo Esposito
- Antonio Fargas
- Laurence Fishburne
- Frances Foster
- Al Freeman, Jr.
- Arthur French
- Richard Gant
- Danny Glover
- Carl Gordon
- Louis Gossett Jr.
- Robert Gossett
- Elaine Graham
- Layon Gray
- Gertrude Greenidge
- David Alan Grier
- Moses Gunn
- Julius Harris
- Jackée Harry
- Sherman Hemsley
- Kene Holliday
- Kevin Hooks
- Samuel L. Jackson
- Steven Anthony Jones
- Brent Jennings
- Cleavon Little
- Delroy Lindo
- Marcella Lowery
- Carol Lynn Maillard
- Judi Ann Mason
- James McDaniel
- Hazel Medina
- S. Epatha Merkerson
- Barbara Montgomery
- Debbi Morgan
- Garrett Morris
- Denise Nicholas
- Ron O'Neal
- Roscoe Orman
- James Pickens Jr.
- Sheryl Lee Ralph
- Phylicia Rashad
- Latanya Richardson
- Larry Riley
- Roxie Roker
- Esther Rolle
- Richard Roundtree
- Cotter Smith
- Joyce Sylvester
- Clarice Taylor
- Glynn Turman
- Sullivan Walker
- Denzel Washington
- Charles Weldon
- Lynn Whitfield
- Samm-Art Williams
- Dick Anthony Williams
- Victor Willis
- Hattie Winston
- Malik Yoba
- C. Kelly Wright
