= St. Mark's Playhouse =

Coordinates: 40°43′44″N 73°59′16″W

St. Mark's Playhouse at 133 Second Avenue in the East Village of Manhattan, New York City, was an Off-Off-Broadway theater notable for presenting the Negro Ensemble Company's production of The First Breeze of Summer by Leslie Lee, which premiered on March 2, 1975, before transferring to Broadway on June 10, where it played through July 20, 1975. St. Mark's Playhouse also showed French playwright Jean Genet's first American performance of his play The Blacks.

The theatre was founded by Lynn Michaels and Harry Baum.
