= J. E. Franklin =

American dramatist (born 1937)

- Born: Jennie Elizabeth Franklin; August 10, 1937 (age 89); Houston, Texas, US
- Education: University of Texas at Austin
- Occupation: Playwright
- Writing career
- Notable work: Black Girl
- Notable awards: Drama Desk Award (1971–72) for Black Girl

J. E. Franklin (born August 10, 1937), who publishes under the name J. e. Franklin, is an American playwright, best known for her play Black Girl, which was broadcast on public television in 1969, staged Off-Broadway in 1971, and made into a 1972 feature film of the same name . She has written and adapted plays for television, theater, and film.

== Early life ==
She was born Jennie Elizabeth Franklin in Houston, Texas, to Robert Franklin and Mathie Randle. She was the eleventh of thirteen children. Her father was a cook who operated the family's store and her mother worked as a maid in the homes of wealthy white families. Due to the alternating work and sleep schedules of her parents, there were strict rules about not making noise at home. She adapted a signal system of her mother's ("used whenever a stranger was around and she did not want to admonish us publicly") to create one that was only understood by herself and her brother, so that they could communicate and noiselessly through "an elaborate system of facial expressions and body language." Once, on a bus, she and her brother were thought to be deaf-mutes. She was also an excellent mimic of sounds. "When she visited her grandparents [her maternal grandfather had remarried], who lived in the country [she called it "Grandpa's Country"], she could mimic the clucking of their chickens so accurately that her grandparents thought that the birds themselves were present." For a time there were six children in one bed at home, as the family rented out their house and lived in the store. Later, she worked alongside her mother, making beds, ironing, and peeling potatoes. "I was a domestic worker," she recalled. While doing domestic work she witnessed disrespectful words hurled at white women from their own family members.

After she learned how to write at school, she collected pencils and tablets of paper to write on. "As a young writer, I soon learned how to scan the school yard, streets, and trails children traveled on their way to and from school for the pencils or pens I could find. I wrote everything on the front and back of each page. Paperbags, napkins, and inside of boxes after the foodstuffs had been eaten – all existed for my use. And, even today, I can barely check the impulse to pick up lost pens and pencils when I see them lying around. Poverty has a way of making one form habits." Her mother brought her cast-off books to read from the "white peoples' houses where she worked. They were filled with stories of talking pigs, fiddling cats, thrifty hens, and a host of other beings... One story, Cinderella, introduced me to the themes of the missing parent, the stepparent, and the siblings who were not whole sisters or brothers." She said that Cinderella was an influence on her play Black Girl, and that the play was not autobiographical.

== New York ==
Franklin attended the University of Texas at Austin, graduating in 1964 with a B.A. degree in Languages. (Her play, Throw Thunder At This House, was about the first Black undergraduate to attend UT, and was performed at Skidmore College in 1979). She moved to New York City, and lived in an apartment near the Judson Memorial Church, which housed the famous Judson Poet's Theatre. At college she had taken courses on short-story writing, but she developed an interest in theater after witnessing Barbara Ann Teer and James Anderson perform live on stage in Rosalyn Drexler's Obie Award-winning one-act musical Home Movies in 1964 at the Judson Poet's Theatre, in the Church's main Meeting Room. It was the first time Franklin had seen Black actors live on a professional stage.

== Freedom School ==
Franklin felt that her "roots were dying" and decided to return to the South. She was asked by the Congress of Racial Equality (CORE) to work with Fannie Lou Hamer to help the voter registration drive as part of Freedom Summer. She taught the children of share-croppers at one of the Mississippi Freedom Democratic Party's Freedom Schools in Harmony, Mississippi. She taught the children under the trees, since they were driven out of every building they tried to use. She taught the children how to read by getting them to speak and write down their words and matching the words to what they said. She helped to create the Sharon Waite Community Center in Harmony, which was the project of Winson Hudson. This community center functioned as a haven for poor Black residents to gather and discuss their concerns and celebrate the spirit of their community. While in there, Franklin was moved to write her first play with the help of her young students, A First Step to Freedom (1964). She had been sent an old typewriter and a mimeograph machine. She printed out copies of the play, which the students held in their hands and used as their reading material (it included lines they had contributed). It was performed by the children at the community center. For many in the audience, it was the first play they had seen. As she has said: "I... had taken a number of courses in college about how to write a short story. It is for this reason, I believe, that I can only write one with much sweat and strain. I took no such course in playwriting, and so I have been on my own to move with freedom and facility as the properties of the stage allow." Franklin's play Freedom Rider (published in 2013) is about a voter registration field-worker, Clarissa, assigned to Harmony, Mississippi during Freedom Summer.

== Playwright ==
With the closing of the Freedom Schools, Franklin returned to New York. She served as a youth director at the Neighborhood House in Buffalo, from 1964 to 1965. On the advice of her agent, Jim Bohan, Franklin sent her work out to theaters using just her initials, J.e., and not her name, Jennie Elizabeth, because "They didn't want women. If you talk to white women and Asian women who are playwrights, they'll tell you the same thing. They didn't want them either. So there was a gender thing." She made the "e" for Elizabeth a lower-case "e", and wrote her name "J.e. Franklin", "Because if I put a big 'E' then they'd figure, 'Okay, this is a man.' If I put the little 'e,' there's, 'Hmm, I wonder?' Good. Keep wondering. I like that. Let 'em wonder."

In 1966, she wrote the play Two Flowers, which was produced by the New Feminist Theatre. She also wrote the first version of her play, Mau Mau Room, in 1966. Her next play was the children's rock opera The In-Crowd: Rock Opera in One Act. It was produced by Woodie King Jr.. He was the Cultural Arts Director for the Mobilization of Youth (MOY) from 1965 to 1970. MOY was a social service agency designed to provide instruction, job training, counseling, and mental health services for delinquent youth on the Lower East Side. King collaborated on the music and dance. The In-Crowd played at the International Youth Festival in the Youth Pavilion at the Montreal Expo in 1967, which Franklin attended.

From 1967 to 1968 she worked as an analyst at the U.S. Office of Economic Opportunity in Washington, D.C. Franklin first heard the term "institutional white racism" from the Kerner Commission in 1968. While in D.C., she volunteered in the soup kitchens of the Black Panther Party. She also she met Alice Childress, from Howard University. "She was the first Black woman playwright I met. We had a long conversation on our train ride back to New York." Franklin moved back to New York and joined the Harlem Writers Guild, which had been founded by John Oliver Killens, Rosa Guy, John Henrik Clarke, Willard Moore, and Walter Christmas as a response to the exclusion they had experienced from the white literary world of New York. She joined so that she could "learn how to talk like a writer [and] get help [with her] work." There she interacted with Maya Angelou, Alice Childress, and Rosa Guy.

In 1969, Franklin's play Mau Mau Room was picked Douglas Turner Ward for Ward and Robert Hooks's Negro Ensemble Company Workshop Festival at St. Mark's Playhouse. It was directed by Shauneille Perry, who later (at Franklin's request) directed her plays Black Girl and Prodigal Sister. According to Franklin, the cast of Mau May Room included Richard Roundtree as "Jimmy" in the play. The title of the play comes from "Mau Mau", the name of the army of Kikuyu insurgents who led a rebellion against British colonial rule in Kenya. Franklin later changed the title of the play at the behest of her agent (it was eventually called Miss Honey's Young'uns (1994)).

== Black Girl (The Teleplay) ==
It was because of her participation in the Harlem Writers Guild that Franklin had success with her play, Black Girl. She wrote the play following the publication of The Negro Family: The Case For National Action, commonly known as the Moynihan Report, in 1965, which linked Black poverty to Black matriarchy. She said later: "The family is not, in my view, of the Moynihanesque matriarchy, but more like the Ashanti matrilineal family wherein males are not inferior in status, but rather society consents to a relationship of heritage around its females." As she later told the story, in the winter of 1968: "I was a member of the [Harlem Writers] Guild and I was at a Guild meeting when a representative from the (public television station) WGBH, (Boston), came to the Guild looking for black writers to write something for the series that they were in the process of putting together [On Being Black]. It was right after Dr. King's assassination that door kind of cracked open. White America was wondering, "What's wrong with the Blacks? What did we do to them? Haven't we been good to them?" So this white man came to the Guild and said that they were looking for people to write something for the series and quite a few of us turned in treatments. Mine was the only one that was selected. My treatment turned out to be Black Girl. Based upon maybe three pages of dialogue and a little narration of what I said I was going to do. They bought it and they hired me to write it for WGBH. It was a video production. So that very first production and presentation of Black Girl was a video production that was broadcast on NET (National Educational Television)" in 1969.

WGBH launched its series of twenty plays – called On Being Black – in conjunction with Brown University. Two professors at Brown, Rhett S. Jones and George Houston Bass (founders of the Rites and Reason Theatre) were the consultants on the project. Bass was the associate producer and script editor of this series of original plays produced on WGBH-TV in 1968 and 1969 that aired nationally over the Public Broadcasting System. Franklin started writing the full play in 1968: "I wrote through Christmastime and New Year's and never even went outside until a full draft was completed." It was finished in 1969, but Bass complained that she had written a play for the stage, not for the camera, and it was too long (one hour and thirty minutes) for the time slot for television. She cut the teleplay script to fifty-seven and a half minutes including the one-minute "teaser" she had to write to introduce the television audience to the central conflict of the play. (The full-length original version was later published in To Break Every Yoke, 2013.)

Black Girl is about a seventeen-year-old in a small town in Texas fighting with her family. Franklin succeeded in getting her youngest sister, Yvette Franklin, to play the main role of Billie Jean, rather than a light-skinned actress, after her sister successfully auditioned for the role. Nevertheless, Franklin disagreed with the producers' and the director's style and interpretation of her script, and was displeased with the actors' interpretations of the characters of Netta and Earl in particular (the actor playing Earl, a friend of the producer, was too old she thought, and could barely deliver his lines). It received mixed reviews when it aired. One critic, who had only read the script, wrote in his review "The danger lies in reducing a subtle and complicated story involving many strong characters into a Cinderella with Prince Charming looking like a college education." Another critic wrote about it being the story of a young girl "trying to break out of her 'ghetto environment'", to which Franklin later replied, "Ghetto environment? How did the critic make this mistake? I had made it clear that the action was set in the South." No copy of the televised broadcast is known to have survived.

Writing in 1977 about George Bass and the On Being Black TV series, Franklin said that "George wanted plays about the social conditions within the black community that serve to hold it in stations of oppression – both mental and physical. And, of course, he wanted plays about the central devices used by the establishment to perpetuate its system of economic deprivation. But the script needs were not limited to the lamentations of oppression. He wanted plays which interpreted the strengths and beauty of a people who have given many riches to the world. He was also looking for plays which celebrated the determination of black people to survive, along with their ability to improvise moments of joy and human fulfillment in spite of the sounds of the whiplash and the shadow of the lynch tree that ares till with black people."

== Black Girl (The Play) ==
Franklin had been told that once a play appeared on television or in the movies, stage producers would not go near the work. She believed that the probability of seeing the play come alive on stage was bleak, and assumed it would simply be published. However, Woodie King Jr., who had given Franklin her start in New York theatre years beforehand with The In-Crowd, was interested in staging the play. King had founded the New Federal Theatre in 1970, adding "New" to the idea of the Federal Theatre Project. The company received funding from a small grant from the New York State Council on the Arts and from the Henry Street Settlement. The first play that he produced was Black Girl. According to Franklin, King's wife, Willie Mae King, had seen Black Girl on WGBH-TV. When King was sent the script of the play by Franklin's agent, his wife read the script and picked Black Girl.

King had two male directors in mind. However, according to Franklin, "I wondered what the play would be like if a woman's spirit were blown into it – after all, most of the characters were women. I asked Woodie what he had against women directors, and he answered "nothing." Shauneille Perry had directed one of my plays at the Negro Ensemble Company. She came instantly to mind. No slow pulse-beat there. Lightning flows through every play she touches. The King and I went to one of her works which was playing then at the Negro Ensemble Company [Rosalee Pritchett, by Barbara Molette and Carlton Mollette], and we both knew that she was the one. A few days afterward Shauneille was making preparations to resurrect my 'Lazarus.'"

Shauneille Perry, who had directed Mau Mau Room, was hired as director (her daughter, Lorraine Ryder, played Sheryl, the daughter of Norma, Billie Jean's sister, in the play). The set was by Charles Mills; the costumes were by Femi and the lighting was by Buddy. It played first at the original location of the New Federal Theatre in the St. Augustine's Church (Manhattan) basement on Henry Street. The play received standing ovations and played to full houses, and the critics gave it rave reviews. The production was then moved to the Off-Broadway Theatre de Lys, on the west of Greenwich Village, where, starting on June 16, 1971, it played for a record six-month run of 247 performances. The play was reviewed favorably in the New York Times and both Franklin and Perry were profiled in the Times two days later, with photographs taken by Bert Andrews (photographer). A few months after the play opened Off-Broadway, another producer offered a road contract to tour four major cities: Baltimore, Washington, D.C., Chicago, and Detroit. A new, second cast had to be hired, which led to Franklin casting Bill Cobbs and discovering the actress Peggy Pettitt, who played Billie Jean in the touring play and later in the film adaptation. Franklin received a Drama Desk Award for most promising playwright for the play, as well a Media Woman Award. Dramatist Play Services published the full-length play Black Girl: A play in Two Acts in 1971. Franklin was invited to speak at public events, including Barbara Ann Teer's Sunday Symposium Series at the National Black Theatre.

In 1986, The McGinn-Cazale Second Stage Theater in New York City had a revival of Black Girl as part of its series on American Classics, directed by Glenda Dickerson and starring a young Angela Bassett as Billie Jean, as well as Ernestine Jackson as Mama Rosie. The New Federal Theatre produced a revival of the play during its 1995–96 season. This production was staged by Anderson Johnson. On Thursday, May 21, 2009, Black Girl was presented by Legros Cultural Arts in New York City.

== Black Girl (The Film) ==
Black Girl was optioned to Hollywood for a film. In 1971, Franklin worked on a feature-film adaptation of the play that was also titled Black Girl, for a very small advance. It was directed by Ossie Davis, and produced by Lee Savin (his first film). It was shot on location in Venice, Los Angeles. It starred Peggy Pettitt (from the touring stage production) as Billie Jean; Leslie Uggams as Netta, who wants Billie Jean to finish school and go to college to study dance; Ruby Dee (wife of Davis) as Netta's mother; Claudia McNeil as Mu'Dear, Billie Jean's grandmother; and Brock Peters as Earl, Mama Rosie's ex-husband. (Other members of the cast included Louise Stubbs Gloria Edwards, and Loretta Greene, who reprised their roles from the play). Songs in the film included Black Girl by Betty Everett and Sisters by Walter Hawkins.

The experience of making and marketing the film was an unhappy one for Franklin. Although the producer, Savin, promised that Woodie King Jr. would be involved in the project, King was dropped. She urged Davis to hire Shauneille Perry as an assistant, but he did not. While she managed to get them to hire Peggy Pettitt, rather than "a light-bright-damned-near-white actress", to play Billie Jean, against her wishes they cast Claudia McNeil, who had been in A Raisin in the Sun, as Mu'Dear. Scenes were re-written and re-arranged by the director, and her voiceover to cover up a "ridiculous" scene between Mu'Dear and Mr. Herbert was never recorded. Even more egregiously, "Efforts were made early in the filming to exploit material for sex and violence," she said. Franklin tried to remove a scene where the young female character of Billie Jean disrobes in front of the camera; it stayed in the film, albeit without nudity. The poster for the film "showed a blow-up of Norma Faye's face, teeth snarling in mad-dog fashion, threatening Billie Jean with a knife. A moment which had lasted only five seconds had been lifted from the film to represent the supposed essence of the entire play.... This was blatant misrepresentation." After Franklin threatened to register her disapproval at every newspaper or television interview and speaking engagement, "In the next few days the illustration appeared without the knife. I thought that was the end of the matter; but a week later later the knife was back." Finally, "voice-overs had been used to erase all "fucks" to make the film eligible for a PG rating. ... I was urged not to mention to anyone that these cuts had been made, as people might think that they had missed something."

The film was released in 1972. It had its world premiere at the Strand Theatre (Manhattan), then known as the Penthouse Theater on Broadway, on 9 November 1972, to benefit sickle cell anemia, and its Los Angeles premiere on 15 November. The film received mixed reviews, with the mainstream New York Times critic describing it as "a poor movie that makes it look as if there never had been a good play." Franklin claimed to not be affected by the movie's release: "When the movie came out, I was a full-time lecturer at Lehman College. I was involved with my student needs." There was talk of a sequel to the film, and of a television series: "The series would be set at the college where Billie had gone to join Netta. Billie and Netta would encounter at the college either a wonderful house-mother or a wonderful educator on the faculty. This woman would be engaged in some esoteric endeavor, trying to make a contribution to education, but would be misunderstood and unappreciated in her intentions by the administration of the college." Although there was a "fat and attractive" offer to write the pilot, Franklin declined to write one, since it was a different story. However, after the release of the film, Franklin was invited to speak by many colleges, community centers, and theatre groups.

The original version of Black Girl was available to watch on Turner Classic Movies and is still available to stream for free on YouTube through Reelblack. A newly restored print of the film, made by UCLA Film & Television Archive and The Film Foundation, and funded by the Hobson/Lucas Family Foundation, had its premiere playing as part of a 24-hour programming block celebrating the 60th anniversary of the UCLA Film Festival & Television Archive on September 25, 2025. The new print (in 35 mm) had its New York premiere as part of the 63rd New York Film Festival on September 28, when it was introduced by Franklin. On October 1, Franklin was joined by Peggy Pettitt in a Q&A after another screening of the film.

== Later Writing ==
In 1972, Franklin published the short-story "The Enemy" in Black Short Story Anthology edited by Woodie King Jr., along with stories by James Baldwin, Nikki Giovanni, Ralph Ellison, Alice Walker, Langston Hughes, and King himself. The story was later adapted for the stage and performed by the Eureka Theatre Group at Lehman College in 1973.

In 1971, she wrote The Prodigal Daughter for a street theatre project performed on Bronx street corners and at Lincoln Center. She later adapted this play and wrote the book for The Prodigal Sister, a musical, with music by Micki Grant, and lyrics by both. It was directed by Shauneille Perry. It played first at the New Federal Theatre's Henry Street Playhouse in July 1974, and then at Theatre de Lys in November 1974, where it was warmly reviewed by Clive Barnes. In 1974, she received the Dramatic Arts Award from the Howard University Institute for the Arts and Humanities. In 1976, she was awarded funding from the National Endowment for the Arts to work on the South Carolina Arts Commission and used theater to teach literacy to children in grades K-12. She wrote Another Morning Rising for a theater troupe, The Company of Us, to tour throughout South Carolina. In 1978, she received the Better Boys Foundation Playwriting Award and the Ajabei Children's Theater Annual Award. In 1979, she received a National Endowment for the Arts Creative Writing Fellowship. In 1980, she received a Rockefeller Fellowship.

In 1977, she published Black Girl: From Genesis to Revelation, which contained autobiographical chapters as well as the full text of the 1971 play. Christchild was published in Women Playwrights: The Best Plays of 1993, edited by Marisa Smith (Smith & Kraus, 1994). Miss Honey's Young'Uns, a revised version of May-Mau Room, was published in Black Drama in America: An Anthology, edited by Darwin T. Turner (Howard University Press, 1994). Two Men'es Daughter was published in The Best American Short Plays 1994-1995, edited by Howard Stein (Applause Theatre Books, 1995), and was included in the seventh edition of Perrine's Literature: Structure, Sound, and Sense, edited by Thomas R. Arp (Harcourt-Brace College Publishers, 1998). Other plays of Franklin include Cut Out the Lights And Call the Law (1972), CrUSAde for Justice (1975), Another Morning Rising (1976), and The Hand-Me-Downs (1978). In 2003, she published Coming to the Mercy Seat, the first of her ten-minute play collections. In 2004 she published Precious Memories, another collection of ten-minute plays. A number of her play manuscripts are held in the archives of Emory University library. In 2013 she self-published To Break Every Yoke (Xlibris, 2013), which contained the plays Freedom Rider, Mother, Dear Mother, I Reckon That's Why They Call Us Colored... Bless They Hearts!, and the original television play of Black Girl.

In 2009, Franklin published the play The Race Primer (Xlibris, 2009). With her daughter, N'zinga Franklin, Franklin published Our Lady Of The Winding Sheets (2006), and A Hip Hop Aesop: Jazzed, Bopped, and Beat-Boxed (2007), an adaptation of some of Aesop's Fables. In 2018, Franklin adapted a hip-hop version of The Goose that Laid the Golden Eggs for a music video, Hip Hop Aesop: A Musical Aesop (2018). Franklin has also published retellings of Aesop's Fables, sometimes in hip-hop style, with illustrations by Brett Forsyth, for Xlibris: Cool Kid and the Wolf (2020) (a retelling of The Goat and the Wolf); The Tortoise and the Hare (2021); The Little Ant and the Happy Grasshopper (2021) (a retelling of The Ant and the Grasshopper); and The Lion and the Mouse (2022).

== Teaching ==
In 1969, Franklin was hired as a part-time Lecturer in the Department of Education at Lehman College in the Bronx. The following year, she was hired as a full-time Lecturer. She taught at Lehman College until 1975. At Lehman she taught her first college course on race. She worked with Associate Professor Mary Rita Donleavy (sister of J. P. Donleavy) on the Eureka-Unitive Education Program. During this time she wrote several plays for her Lehman students (Eureka Theatre Group), including Four Women: A Play in One Act, based on the Nina Simone song Four Women, reimagined as roommates attending an integrated college, which was performed at Lehman College in 1973. Macpilate was performed at Lehman College in 1974, and The Creation was performed at Lehman College in 1975.

Franklin attended Union Theological Seminary for two semesters in 1972–1973, although she did not complete a degree. There she took a liberation theology class with James H. Cone. In 1978–1979, she taught at Skidmore College. From 1982 to 1989, she was the resident playwright at Brown University, where she worked with George Houston Bass and Rhett Jones, co-founders of Rites and Reason Theatre. Where Dewdrops Of Mercy Shine Bright was performed at Brown University in 1993. In 1990, she was a Visiting assistant professor in the Department of Theatre Arts at the University of Iowa. A graduate student in her script analysis course, Tisch Jones, the daughter of Geneva Handy Southall, asked to stage her work for the Playwrights Festival as part of her degree. It led to the first three ten-minute plays of Franklin's being performed at the festival. Wonderchild was performed at the University of Iowa in 1993 and directed by Jones, who had requested that the play be written. In 1992–1993, Franklin was a Fellow of the Schomburg Center at the New York Public Library. In the 1990s, she was a faculty member at the Harlem School of the Arts. She also founded the Blackgirl Ensemble Theatre in New York City. In April 2021, during the pandemic, she joined a class, "African American Plays from Stage to Screen" at Middlebury College remotely to talk about her career and to "provide advice for the next generation of creative minds." On May 30, 2024, at the 56th Commencement of Lehman College, Franklin was awarded an honorary Doctor of Letters. As stated in the Commencement program, "Franklin's impact as playwright, educator, and activist is evident in her fearless exploration of the Black experience in America, particularly the experience of Black women and families."

== Personal ==
Franklin married Lawrence Siegel in 1964. Her daughter is the actress, spoken word artist, and director N'zinga Franklin, who goes professionally by Malika Nzinga, and who has appeared in the television series Daredevil and Luke Cage.

== Selected credits ==
=== Theatre ===
Year	Production	Theatre(s)	Notes	
1993	Wonderchild	Iowa University	Written by J. E. Franklin; directed by Tisch Jones	
1993	Where Dewdrops of Mercy Shine Bright	Brown University	Written by J. E. Franklin	
1992	Christchild	(New Federal Theatre) Henry Street Settlement	Written by J. E. Franklin; directed by Irving Vincent	
1979	Throw Thunder At This House	Skidmore College	Written by J. E. Franklin	Stage Manager - Jeffrey S Titcomb
1974	The Prodigal Sister	(New Federal Theatre) Henry Street Playhouse / Theatre de Lys	Musical written by J. E. Franklin and Micki Grant, based on Franklin's play, Prodigal Daughter (1971); directed by Shauneille Perry	
1973	Four Women	Lehman College	Written by J. E. Franklin; based on the song Four Women by Nina Simone; directed by J. E. Franklin; performed by Eureka Theatre Group	
1971	Black Girl	(New Federal Theatre) St. Augustine's Church (Manhattan) / Theatre de Lys	Written by J. E. Franklin; directed by Shauneille Perry	
1969	Mau Mau Room	(Negro Ensemble Company) St. Mark's Playhouse	Written by J. E. Franklin; directed by Shauneille Perry	
1967	The In-Crowd: Rock Opera in One Act	Montreal Expo, Youth Pavilion	Written by J. E. Franklin; choreographed by Woodie King Jr.; performed by Mobilization for Youth (MOY)	
1966	Two Flowers	New Feminist Theatre	Written by J. E. Franklin	
1964	A First Step to Freedom	Sharon Waite Community Center, Harmony Mississippi	Written by J. E. Franklin; directed by J. E. Franklin	

=== Television ===
Year	Production	Producer(s)	Notes
1969	Black Girl WGBH (Boston)	Produced by George Houston Bass	Screenplay by J. E. Franklin

=== Film ===
Year	Production	Producer(s)	Notes
1972	Black Girl	Produced by Robert H. Greenberg and Lee Savin	Screenplay by J. E. Franklin; directed by Ossie Davis

=== Publications ===
Year	Title	Publisher	ISBN
2013	To Break Every Yoke	Published by Xlibris	978-14836-6358-6
2004	Precious Memories	Published by Blackgirl Ensemble Theatre, Inc.	0974666912
2003	Coming to the Mercy Seat	Published by Blackgirl Ensemble Theatre, Inc.	0974666904
1995	"Two Men'es Daughter" in Best American Short Plays 1994-1995, edited by Howard Stein	Published by Applause Theatre Books	978-1557832320
1994	"Miss Honey's Young's" in Black Drama in America: An Anthology, edited by Darwin T. Turner	Published by Smith & Kraus	978-1880399453
1994	"Christchild" in Women Playwrights: The Best Plays of 1993, edited by Marisa Smith	Published by Howard University Press	978-0882580623
1976	The Prodigal Sister: A New Black Musical	Published by French's Musical Library	
1977	Black Girl: From Genesis to Revelations	Published by Howard University Press	0-88258-019-1
1972	"The Enemy" in Black Short Story Anthology edited by Woodie King Jr., pp. 349–359	Published by Columbia University Press	0-231-03711-2
1971	Black Girl: A Play in Two Acts	Published by Dramatists Play Service	

== Awards ==
- Media Woman Award (1971)
- Drama Desk Award for Most Promising Playwright (1971–1972 season)
- CaPS Award (1972)
- Institute for the Arts and Humanities Dramatic Arts Award, Howard University (1974)
- Globe award
- Audelco award
- Better Boys Foundation Playwriting Award (1978)
- Ajabei Children's Theater Annual Award (1978)
- National Endowment for the Arts Creative Writing Fellowship (1979)
- Rockefeller Grant (1980)
- Eugene O'Neill Fellow (1981–1982)
- John F. Kennedy New American Play Award (1992)
