= Shauneille Perry =

American stage director and playwright (1929–2022)

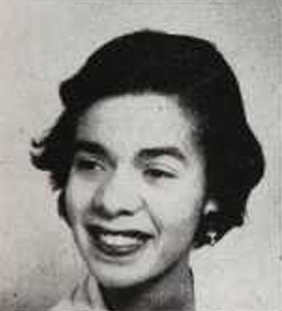
- Perry in 1950
- Born: Shauneille Gantt Perry; July 26, 1929; Chicago, Illinois, U.S.
- Died: June 9, 2022 (aged 92); New Rochelle, New York, U.S.
- Education: Howard University (BFA); Art Institute of Chicago (MFA); London Academy of Music and Dramatic Art
- Occupations: Theatre director, playwright, actor
- Years active: 1950s–2022
- Spouse: Donald P. Ryder (m. 1957; died 2021)
- Children: 3
- Parent(s): Graham T. Perry; Laura Pearl Gantt
- Relatives: Lorraine Hansberry (first cousin)
- Awards: AUDELCO (1974, 1985)

Shauneille Gantt Perry Ryder (July 26, 1929 – June 9, 2022) was an American stage director and playwright. She was one of the first African-American women to direct off-Broadway.

== Biography ==
Shauneille Perry was born on July 26, 1929, in Chicago, Illinois, to a prominent African-American family. She is the only child of Graham T. Perry (1894–1960), one of the first African-American assistant attorneys-general for the State of Illinois and his wife, the former (Laura) Pearl Gantt (1903–1957), one of the first African-American court reporters in Chicago, who studied business at Morris Brown College. She is the niece by marriage of real-estate broker and political activist Carl Augustus Hansberry, who married her father's sister, Nannie Louise Perry, and the first cousin of playwright Lorraine Hansberry, their daughter. She is also the niece by marriage of Carl Hansberry's brother, Africanist scholar William Leo Hansberry. She later said, "Lorraine and I sat at the table a lot with people visiting our parents, like Sidney Williams, who headed the Chicago Urban League, who used to talk about Africa and wear dashikis long before it happened in the sixties. We used to read about and see Mary McLeod Bethune. And I was trying to think of some of those people who inspired me – Edith Sampson, one of the first black lady lawyers in Chicago."

Perry was raised on the west side of Chicago, where she graduated from Marshall High School. "I wanted to be a journalist. I used to read about Margaret Bourke-White and Claire Booth Luce and those kinds of women. ... I knew I wanted to go to a black college. ... At that time, it was Howard, Fisk, or Tallageda. ... I went to Howard, to take journalism, and when I got there, Margaret Just Butcher said, 'My dear, we don't have journalism here.' ... one thing led to another and I found my way to the little theatre at Howard. And when I met [faculty members] Anne Cooke [Reid], Owen Dodson, and James Butcher, I felt comfortable and enjoyed being in plays. The future was sealed, I guess." While at Howard University (1946–1950), she was a member of the Howard Players, under the direction of Prof. Owen Dodson, along with fellow students Roxie Roker and Zaida Coles (Edley). At Howard, Perry overlapped with Toni Morrison. Perry also acted at Clark Atlanta University and Lincoln University (Missouri) under Thomas Desiré Pawley, III, as part of the HBCU's Summer Theatre Program. In 1949, she was one of the 21 Howard Players and three faculty who toured Norway, Sweden, Denmark, and Germany that fall, with 59 alternating performances of Mamba's Daughters, the stage adaptation by Dorothy Heyward and DuBose Heyward of DuBose Heyward's book, and Henrik Ibsen's The Wild Duck. They were seen off on the SS Stavangerfjord by Howard University trustee Eleanor Roosevelt. The tour was a great success. On the opening night in Denmark of Mamba's Daughters, the production received 15 curtain calls: "Shauneille Perry especially was relieved because she had been shocked by being spit on as she was going onstage! Cookie [Anne Cooke] had failed to warn us that the Danes spit on the costumes of the actors for good luck." She played Lisa, the granddaughter who returns from New York to Virginia all dressed up, and Dodson had failed to get her a costume dress for the tour. She eventually had to buy one herself in Oslo.

In 1950, Perry received a BA degree in drama from Howard University. She continued her studies at the Goodman School of Drama at the Art Institute of Chicago (now at DePaul University) (1950–1952), where she received an MFA in directing in 1952 with a production and thesis of the play Death of a Salesman by Arthur Miller. In 1952–1953, she was an Instructor and Director in English and Theatre at North Carolina A&T State University in Greensboro, N.C. "My first job was teaching at AT&T College in Greensboro, where I put on a play and was immediately told by the chaplain I couldn't do that because it had bad language, etc. So I spent a year at AT&T." In 1953–1954, she was an Instructor and Department Chair of Theatre at Dillard University.

In 1954–1955, she was a Fulbright Scholar in London, studying classical theatre at the Royal Academy of Dramatic Art before quickly transferring to the London Academy of Music and Dramatic Art after she and other foreign students experienced racial harassment. She later commented about her time in London that she was "always doing Cleopatra". She went to New York to start work in theater there, but returned to Chicago to care for her mother. From 1956 to 1958, Perry was an Adjunct Director at the Goodman School of Drama. During this time, she was also a writer for the Women's Page of The Chicago Defender (national edition), and the Daily Defender (daily edition). "I got a job at The Chicago Defender, writing, right back full circle. They put me on the women's page, where I didn't want to be, writing about weddings, peau de soie and all of that. They wouldn't let me do hard news; chauvinism reared its ugly head and they said, 'You can not go out there.' But I said, 'I'm going to do it.' So I started writing feature stories on people and on theatre. Ethel L. Payne, whom I admired, was there, and she said, 'Why don't you hand these things in?' So I did."

In 1957, Perry married architect Donald P. Ryder in Chicago. Ryder later partnered with J. Max Bond Jr. to form the architectural firm Bond Ryder & Associates.

Several months after her marriage, she received national exposure as the second-place winner in the 1958 Picturama Contest, an essay competition sponsored by Ebony Magazine. She made use of the $4,000 prize money to take a three-week trip to Paris, France, with her husband in 1959. While she was in Paris, she met Richard Wright. By the end of the decade, both of her parents had passed away. Perry and her husband relocated to New York City, where it did not take long for her to establish herself as an actress.

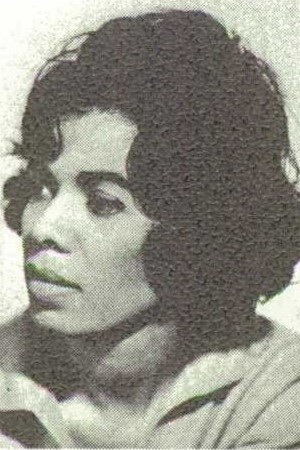
Perry at the Fieldston School in 1966

In the late 1950s and early 1960s, she acted in various productions on the New York City stage, including The Goose (1959), Dark of the Moon (1960) (directed by Vinnette Carroll, where she played alongside James Earl Jones and Harold Scott (director)), Talent '60 (1960), Ondine (1961), Clandestine on the Morning Line (1961) and The Octoroon (1961). Her work as Lilly Ruth, a pregnant girl in the short-lived off-Broadway production of Clandestine on the Morning Line, received particular notice: "It is a young actress named Shauneille Perry... who is the surprise of the evening. She plays the pregnant girl with such quiet, innocent strength and apparent unawareness of the character's pathos that we almost forget it, too. The girl is indeed pathetic, but she is so much else besides. It is a lovely performance." In 1961–1962, she was also a lecturer in speech at Hunter College. From 1962 to 1968, she was a teacher in Speech and Drama at the Fieldston School.

Despite her success as a performer, Perry became disenchanted with acting and turned her focus toward writing, directing, and raising a family. "Got tired of acting," she once said, "it was too slow; too much business." "And so I began directing at the Negro Ensemble Company, and I directed at almost every black theatre company – Afro-American Total [Theatre], Roger Furman New Heritage Theatre Group, Billie Holiday [Theatre], all of them during that period."

After Vinnette Carroll, Perry became one of the first African-American women to direct on the New York stage. One of her early directorial efforts was the Off-Off-Broadway production of Mau Mau Room, written by J. E. Franklin, as part of the Negro Ensemble Company Workshop Festival, at St. Mark's Playhouse in 1969. According to Franklin, the cast included Richard Roundtree. In 1971, Perry staged three different productions. Two of them were Rosalie Pritchett, by Barbara and Carlton Molette, and The Sty of the Blind Pig, by Phillip Hayes Dean, both by the Negro Ensemble Company Workshop at St. Mark's Playhouse. Her production of Rosalie Pritchett used "300 slides on four different rear-projection screens." She also directed the stage production by the New Federal Theatre (founded by Woodie King Jr.) of J. E. Franklin's play, Black Girl, at St. Augustine's Church (Manhattan) on Henry Street. Perry's "direction of Black Girl included a simple and intimate set that emphasized the importance of religion with the lives of the Southern black women. While the original television version of the play omitted the religious aspects of the play (including Billie Jean at prayer), Perry's production featured a prominent photo of Christ in the home. ... Perry's attention to detail and grasp of character garnered the respect and admiration of Franklin, as well as theater critics. Perry, however, hoped that the success of Black Girl and the play's important theme of self-determination would have a more far-reaching effect. "I hope this makes people aware of what Black actresses can do. They can do more than 'Carmen Jones', 'Anna Lucas', and the like," says Perry." The play received standing ovations and played to full houses, and the critics gave it rave reviews. The production was then moved to the Theatre de Lys, where it played from June 16, 1971, to June 16, 1972. This was the first major stage production of a play written by J. E. Franklin. The play then toured Baltimore, Washington, D.C., Chicago, and Detroit. It was made into a film of the same name in 1972, directed by Ossie Davis, with a screenplay by Franklin.

Later she recalled, "I remember Black Girl in the sixties, by J. E. Franklin. We did it in a gymnasium at night. ... And it was an extension of all of the other stuff that I'd done – Louise Stubbs, Arthur French, Minnie Gentry. ... Black Girl began that process of shows moving off Off-Broadway or to Off-Broadway.; that was kind of the beginning of things beginning in workshop."

Perry was reunited with Franklin in 1974 when she directed the musical Prodigal Sister, with book by Franklin, music by Micki Grant, and lyrics by both Franklin and Grant, first at the New Federal Theatre's Henry Street Playhouse in July 1974, and then at Theatre de Lys in November 1974, where it was warmly reviewed by Clive Barnes.

In addition to directing, Perry has written several plays including the book of the children's musical Mio, which she staged as a workshop production at the New Federal Theatre in the fall of 1971. It was later staged (with a different director) at the Henry Street Settlement in New York City in 1978. Other plays she either wrote or co-wrote include Last Night, Night Before (1971), Daddy Goodness (1979), and Things of the Heart: Marian Anderson's Story (1981).

Perry also wrote Sounds of the City, a 15-minute daily soap opera that aired on the Mutual Black Network in the mid-1970s.

From 1968 to 1970, she was a lecturer in the SEEK program at City College of New York. Between 1970 and 1980, she taught at Borough of Manhattan Community College, in the Department of African-American Studies, first as an Assistant Professor (1970-1974) and then as an Adjunct Assistant Professor (1974-1980). From 1980 to 1984, she taught as an Adjunct Assistant Professor at Queens College. From 1984 to 1985, she was Creative Director at the United Negro College Fund.

In 1986, she was hired as Director of Theatre at Lehman College. She continued to teach as associate professor of theatre at Lehman until she retired in 2001. A celebration of her life organized by her family and including family, friends, and former students was held in the Lovinger Theatre at Lehman College on August 21, 2022.

== Personal ==
Perry and her cousin Lorraine Hansberry were born less than a year apart and were very close. One summer when they were little girls, Lorraine's mother took them to Columbia, Tennessee, where she and Perry's father had grown up. Along the way, her aunt pointed out the Kentucky hills where her father (Shauneille's and Lorraine's grandfather) George Perry had hidden after he escaped from slavery.

Years later, Shauneille was there when Lorraine had cancer and supported her. Hansberry named her as substitute executor of her estate after her ex-husband, Robert Barron Nemiroff.

Lenny Kravitz, son of Roxie Roker, considered Perry as an aunt, writing in his memoir that "there was the brilliant Aunt Shauneille. Shauneille Perry and Mom had attended Howard together ... Aunt Shauneille had a love and understanding of the arts that launched her to become one of the voices of her generation. She became a prominent director, writer, and actor, and her home at 444 Central Park West became a cultural mecca, the unofficial headquarters of the Black Arts Movement. On any given day, I'd be sitting in the corner of Aunt Shauneille's living room while Nikki Giovanni read her poetry aloud or ensembles rehearsed plays. ... Aunt Shauneille's enormous living room housed a tall avocado tree, floor-to-ceiling bookcases, paintings, and gorgeous African masks that mesmerized me. ... Writer Toni Morrison was another close friend. She had gone to college with Mom and Aunt Shauneille, where they were part of the theater group the Howard Players."

Shauneille Perry died on June 9, 2022, in New Rochelle, New York, at the age of 92.

== Selected credits ==
=== Theatre ===
==== Directing ====
Year	Production	Theatre(s)	Notes
2006	The Taking of Miss Janie	Harry De Jur Playhouse / Abrons Arts Center	
1995	The Tropical Breeze Hotel	Ubu Repertory Theatre, New York City	Written by Maryse Condé (Pension les Alizés (1988)); translation by Barbara Brewster Lewis and Catherine Temerson (1994)
1998	In Dahomey	New Federal Theatre	Also writer
1993	In Bed with the Blues: The Adventure of Fishy Waters	New Federal Theatre	Written by Guy Davis
1993	Looking Back	New Federal Theatre	Written by Micki Grant
1990	The Balm Yard	New Federal Theatre	Written by Don Kinch
1986	Williams & Walker	American Place Theatre	Written by Vincent Smith
1981	Keyboard	New Federal Theatre	Written by Matt Robinson
1981	Love	New Federal Theatre	Written by Carolyn Rodgers
1981	Who Loves the Dancer	New Federal Theatre	Written by Rob Penny
1979	Trouble in Mind	New Federal Theatre	Written by Alice Childress. Part of A Black Retrospective with four other plays.
1978	African Interlude	New Federal Theatre	Written by Martie Evans-Charles
1977	Relationships	E.S.T. Theater	A program of two one-act plays by Philip Hayes Dean
1976	Showdown	New Federal Theatre	Written by Don Evans
1974	The Prodigal Sister	Theatre de Lys	Musical written by J. E. Franklin and Micki Grant, based on Franklin's play, Prodigal Daughter
1972	Jamimma	New Federal Theatre	Written by Martie Evans-Charles
1971	The Sty of the Blind Pig	St. Mark's Playhouse/Negro Ensemble Company	Written by Phillip Hayes Dean
1971	Black Girl	Theatre de Lys/New Federal Theatre (after St. Augustine's Church)	Written by J. E. Franklin
1971	Rosalee Pritchett	St. Mark's Playhouse/Negro Ensemble Company	Written by Barbara Molette and Carlton Molette
1969	Mau Mau Room	St. Mark's Playhouse/Negro Ensemble Company	Written by J. E. Franklin

==== Writing ====
Year	Production	Theatre(s)	Notes
1981	Things of the Heart: Marian Anderson's Story	New Federal Theatre	Directed by Denise Hamilton. Part of the Ethnic Heritage Series.
1979	Aunt Willie Pays a Call	Henry Street Settlement	
1978	Mio	Henry Street Settlement	Book of musical.
1976	Clinton: An Urban Fairytale	New Heritage Repertory Theatre	
1971	Mio	New Federal Theatre	Also directed.

==== Acting ====
Year	Production	Role	Theatre(s)	Notes
1961	Octoroon	Grace	Phoenix Theatre	
1961	Clandestine on the Morning Line	Lilly Ruth	Actors Playhouse	
1961	Ondine		Lenox Hill Playhouse	
1960	Talent '60			
1960	Dark of the Moon		Lenox Hill Playhouse	
1959	The Goose		Sullivan Street Playhouse	

=== Television ===
==== Writing ====
Year	Production	Network	Notes
2001	The Old Settler	PBS	Adaptation of the play by John Henry Redwood. Part of the series PBS Hollywood Presents
1978	Watch Your Mouth!	PBS	One episode

=== Motion Pictures ===
==== Acting ====
Year	Title	Role	Distributor	Notes
1981	Death of a Prophet			
1978	Black Theatre: The Making of a Movement	Herself	California Newsreel	Documentary
1976	The Long Night		Howard Mahler Films	
1971	Desperate Characters	Woman Doctor	ITC Films	Credited as Shauneille Ryder

== Awards and recognition ==
- 1974: AUDELCO Award, Best Director
- 1985: AUDELCO Award, Best Director
- 2019: Lloyd Richards Director's Award, National Black Theater Festival

Perry is also the recipient of a Broadcast Media Award, a Fulbright scholarship, a New York State Council of the Arts Young Audiences Play Commission and a Black Rose of Excellence from Encore Magazine.
