= Black Girl =

A Black girl is a young Black woman. Black Girl or Black Girls may also refer to:

== Music ==
- BlackGirl, an American R&B group
- An alternate name for the American folk song "In the Pines" or "Where Did You Sleep Last Night"
- "Black Girl", a 1993 song by Lenny Kravitz from Are You Gonna Go My Way
- "Black Girls", a 1984 song by the Violent Femmes from Hallowed Ground

== Film, television, and theater ==
- Black Girl (1966 film), the 1966 Senegalese drama film by Ousmane Sembène
- Black Girl (play), the 1969 American play by J. E. Franklin
- Black Girl (1972 film), the 1972 American drama film by Ossie Davis
- Black Girls Rock!, an annual awards program broadcast by Black Entertainment Television
