= Donald Ryder =

Donald Ryder may refer to:

- Donald J. Ryder, retired U.S. Army major general
- Donald P. Ryder (1926–2021), American architect
