= UWG =

UWG may refer to:

- UWG Inc., an advertising agency
- University of West Georgia
