= Rutgers Presbyterian Church =

Church in Manhattan, New York

Coordinates: 40°46′46.6″N 73°58′56.5″W

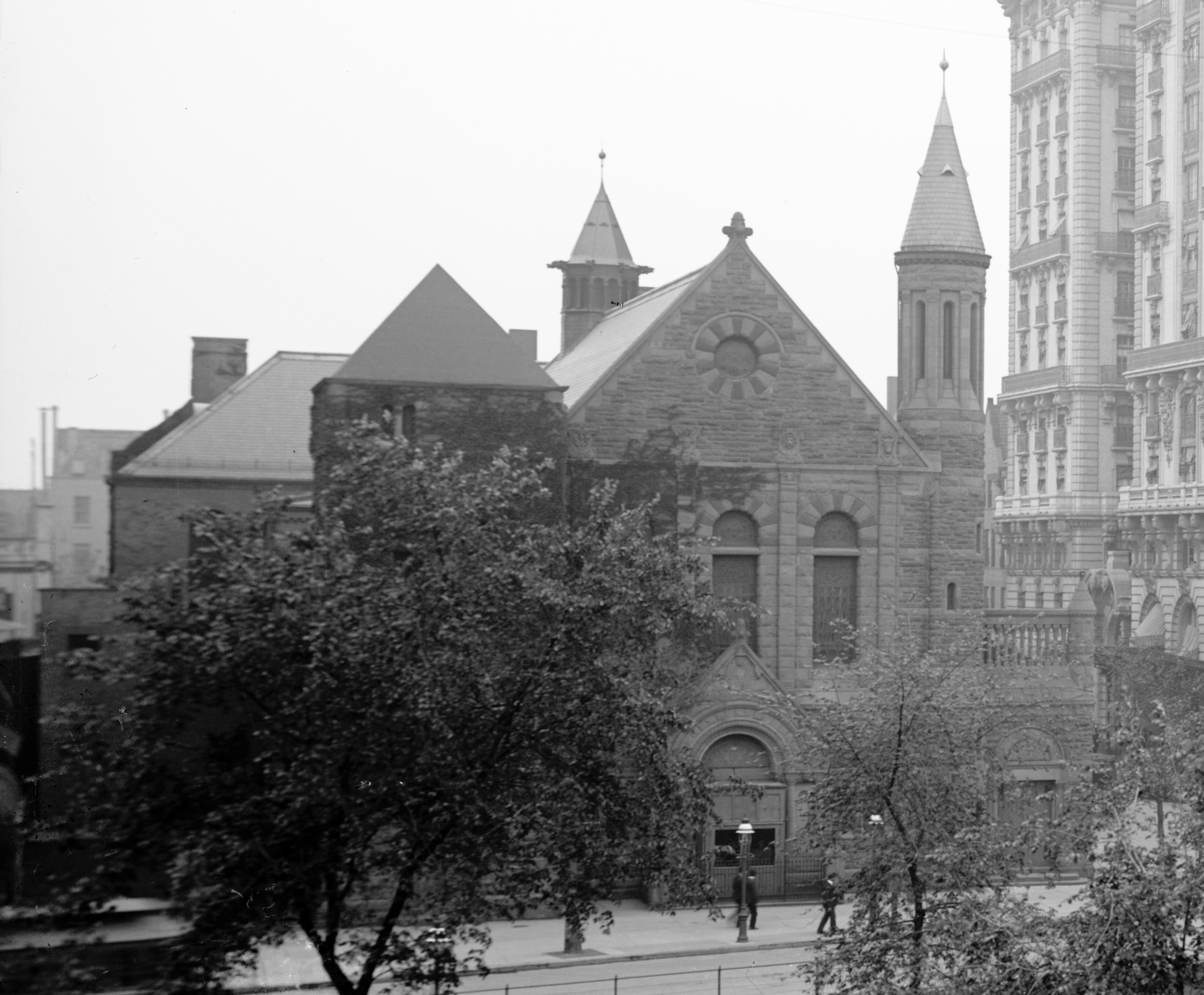
The Rutgers Presbyterian Church building as it appeared in 1905, near the Ansonia Hotel.

Rutgers Presbyterian Church is a Presbyterian house of worship in New York City.

The church's origins date to 1798 in Lower Manhattan. The first church building was erected on a plot of ground donated by Colonel Henry Rutgers at the corner of what would become Henry and Rutgers Streets. The church building was paid for by contributions from the members. The original charter contained 107 names, and the first church building was dedicated on May 13, 1798.

According to the Rutgers Church's official Website, "By 1830… Rutgers had become the largest Presbyterian church in the denomination, with 1,157 members. The old frame church was replaced in 1843 with a large stone structure (still standing and in use as the Roman Catholic Church of St. Teresa)." Church records indicate that this building is a hitherto unrecognized work by the important New York architect Minard Lafever, designed at a time when Lafever was transitioning from an architect who specialized in the Greek Revival to one who employed the Gothic Revival for his churches. The congregation subsequently moved into the Lenox Chapel (29th and Madison) in 1863. They razed it in 1873 and built a new church at that location. Fifteen years later, the congregation sold this property and used the proceeds to build a chapel (1888) and church (1890) at the corner of 73rd Street and Broadway—near the Ansonia Hotel.

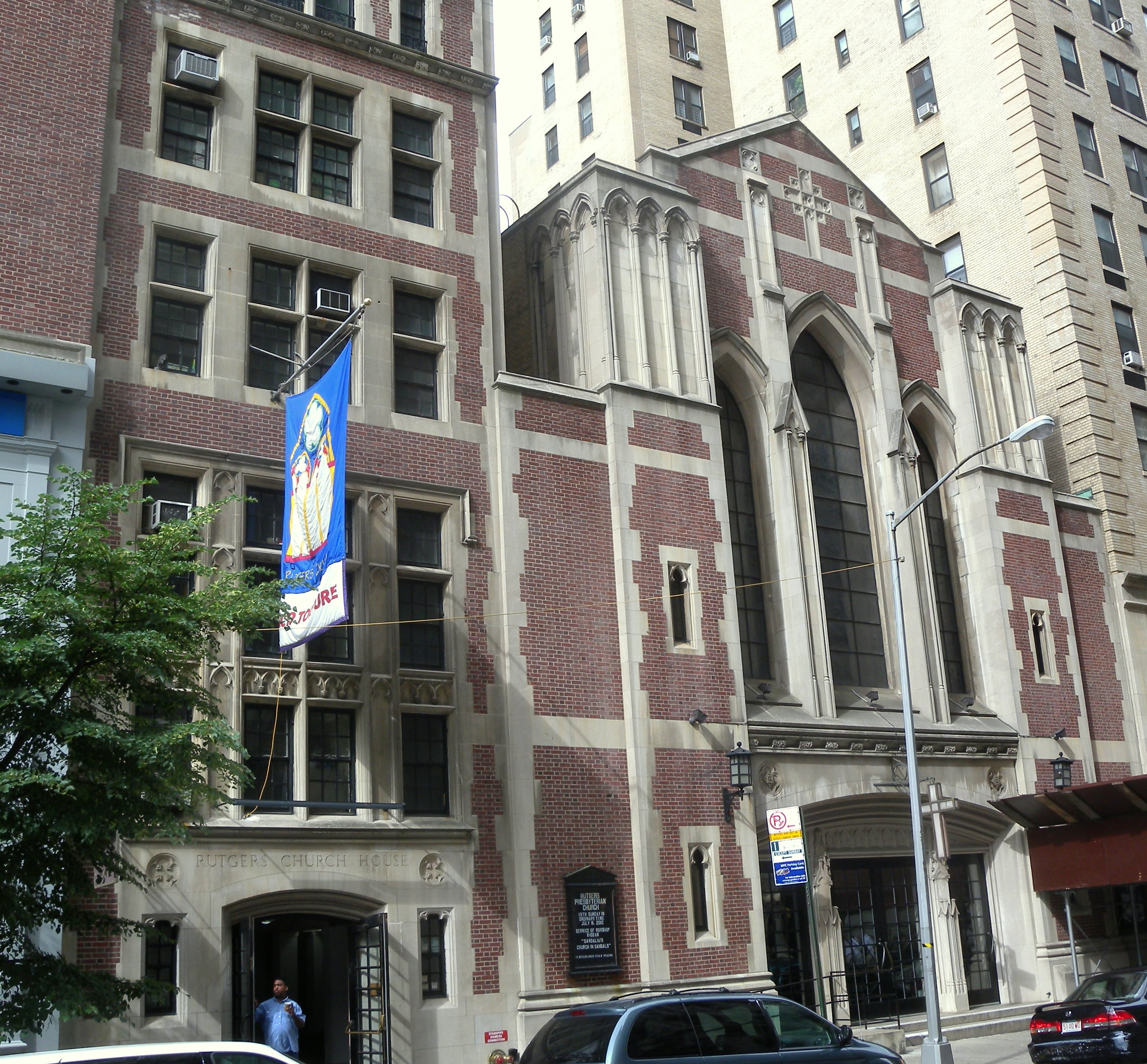
73rd Street

The church has largely embraced social justice, and has broken with mainstream Christian beliefs. Its congregants are not strictly required to have a traditional based belief in God, the church has hung up a Black Lives Matter banner, and gender fluid buttons are available for its members.

Today's Rutgers Church was opened in 1926 and is located at 236 West 73rd Street in New York's Upper West Side.
