= Black Girl (play) =

- Written by: J. E. Franklin
- Original language: English
- Genre: Drama

Premiere
- Date premiered: June 17, 1971
- Place premiered: Theatre de Lys; New York City

Black Girl is a play by American playwright J. E. Franklin. It was first produced on public television in 1969, followed by an off-Broadway production in 1971. It was later adapted by the playwright as a feature film that was released the following year.

== Plot synopsis ==
A family drama about a young woman who defies the low expectations thrust upon her and pursues her dream of becoming a dancer.

== Television production ==
Produced by WGBH, Boston in 1969. The teleplay featured Yvette Franklin, Joan Sandler, Barbara Griffith, and Judy Mills.

== Original Off-Broadway production ==
- Directed by Shauneille Perry
- Produced by New Federal Theatre
- Producers: Bert Beck, Woodie King Jr. and Dick Williams
- Set Designer: Charles Mills
- Costume Designer: Femi
- Lighting Designer: Buddy
- Sound Designer: Gary Harris
- Production Stage Manager: Horacena J. Taylor
- Opened: June 17, 1971 at Theatre De Lys

=== Cast ===
- Arthur French - Earl
- Minnie Gentry - Mu'Dear
- Leslie Uggams - Netta
- Louise Stubbs - Mama Rosie
- Kishasha - Billie Jean
- Gloria Edwards - Norma
- Loretta Greene - Ruth Ann
- Stacey Durant - Sheryl
- Troy Warren - Little Earl
- Jimmy Hayeson - Mr. Herbert

== Feature film ==
- Directed by Ossie Davis
- Producer: Lee Savin
- Executive Producer: Robert Greenberg
- Distributed by Cinerama Releasing Corporation
- Opened: November 9, 1972 in New York City

=== Cast ===
- Brock Peters - Earl
- Claudia McNeil - Mu'Dear
- Leslie Uggams - Netta
- Louise Stubbs - Mama Rose
- Peggy Pettitt - Billie Jean
- Gloria Edwards - Norma
- Loretta Greene - Ruth Ann
- Ruby Dee - Netta's Mother
- Kent Martin - Herbert

== Other productions ==
The New Federal Theatre produced a revival of the play during its 1995–96 season. This production was staged by Anderson Johnson.

On Thursday, May 21, 2009, Black Girl was presented by Legros Cultural Arts in New York City.
