= Graham T. Perry =

American lawyer and activist (1894–1960)

- Born: Graham Turner Perry; April 22, 1894; Columbia, Tennessee
- Died: September 9, 1960 (aged 66); Chicago, Illinois
- Education: Morehouse College (1923); Northwestern University School of Law (J.D., 1923)
- Occupation: Attorney
- Political party: Republican
- Spouse(s): Laura Pearl Gantt (c.1928–1957) (her death); Helen E. Clem (1959–1960) (his death)
- Children: Shauneille Perry
- Relatives: Lorraine Hansberry (niece)

Graham Turner Perry (April 22, 1894 – September 9, 1960) was an African-American attorney who served as assistant attorney general for the State of Illinois. He is also the father of stage director Shauneille Perry and uncle of playwright Lorraine Hansberry.

== Biography ==
According to the 1900 U.S. Census, Perry was born in April 1894 (some sources indicate either April 22, 1897, January 22, 1898 or April 22, 1900) in Columbia, Tennessee, the youngest child of the Rev. George W. Perry, an escaped former slave, and Charlotte "Lottie" Organ. He received his elementary and secondary school education in Columbia. After graduating from College Hill School, he later attended Morehouse College in Atlanta, Georgia. At Morehouse, Perry was a well-rounded student who in addition to the being a member of the debate team, played varsity baseball, sang in the Glee Club, served as assistant advertising manager of the school yearbook, and was a Shakespearean actor who appeared in a production of Othello. He was also a member of Omega Psi Phi fraternity. In 1923, he received the degree of juris doctor from the Northwestern University School of Law.

He was very active in civil rights, having served as vice president of the Chicago branch of the NAACP. He also served on the board of the Chicago branch of the Urban League.

In 1941, he was elected to the post of assistant attorney general for the State of Illinois. After Nathan K. McGill, he was one of the first African Americans to hold that position in the state. No African American would serve as a state's attorney general until Edward Brooke was elected Attorney General of Massachusetts in 1962. Perry served as an assistant attorney general from 1942 to 1950, and specialized in military and labor-related issues. This included cases involving the reinstatement of veterans to positions they held prior to military service.

During World War II, Perry helped enforce anti-discrimination requirements with firms holding war contracts.

In January 1948, he was chosen by the Republican party as a candidate for judge in Chicago's Municipal court. Despite a strong showing by U.S. presidential candidate Thomas E. Dewey at the top of the ticket, the Chicago Democrats had a clean sweep of the local election in November of that year. Perry received a total of 638,689 votes and tied for twenty-first place out of 33 candidates for twelve positions.

In 1953, Perry was appointed assistant United States attorney to handle cases involving military conscientious objectors. He was working in a similar capacity for the northern district of Illinois at the time of his death.

He died on September 9, 1960, at his home in Chicago. and is buried at the Burr Oak Cemetery near Chicago.
