= Bert Andrews =

Bert Andrews may refer to:

- Bert Andrews (photographer) (1929–1993), American photographer
- Bert Andrews (journalist) (1901–1953), American journalist
