= Rites and Reason Theatre =

Theater at Brown University in the US

Coordinates: 41.82773°N 71.40159°W

- Formation: 1970
- Type: Theatre group
- Location: Brown University, Providence, RI
- Notable members: Ossie Davis; Ruby Dee; Adrienne Kennedy
- Website: africana.brown.edu/rites-and-reason-theatre

Rites and Reason Theatre is a theater within the Africana Studies department of Brown University in Providence, Rhode Island. It was founded in 1970 by Professor George Houston Bass, and Professor Rhett Jones, is one of the longest-running continuously producing black theaters in the United States. Writers for the theater have included Ossie Davis, Ruby Dee, and Adrienne Kennedy. The theatre serves to develop theatrical and visual performance works that articulate and understand the expansive African Diaspora.

== History ==
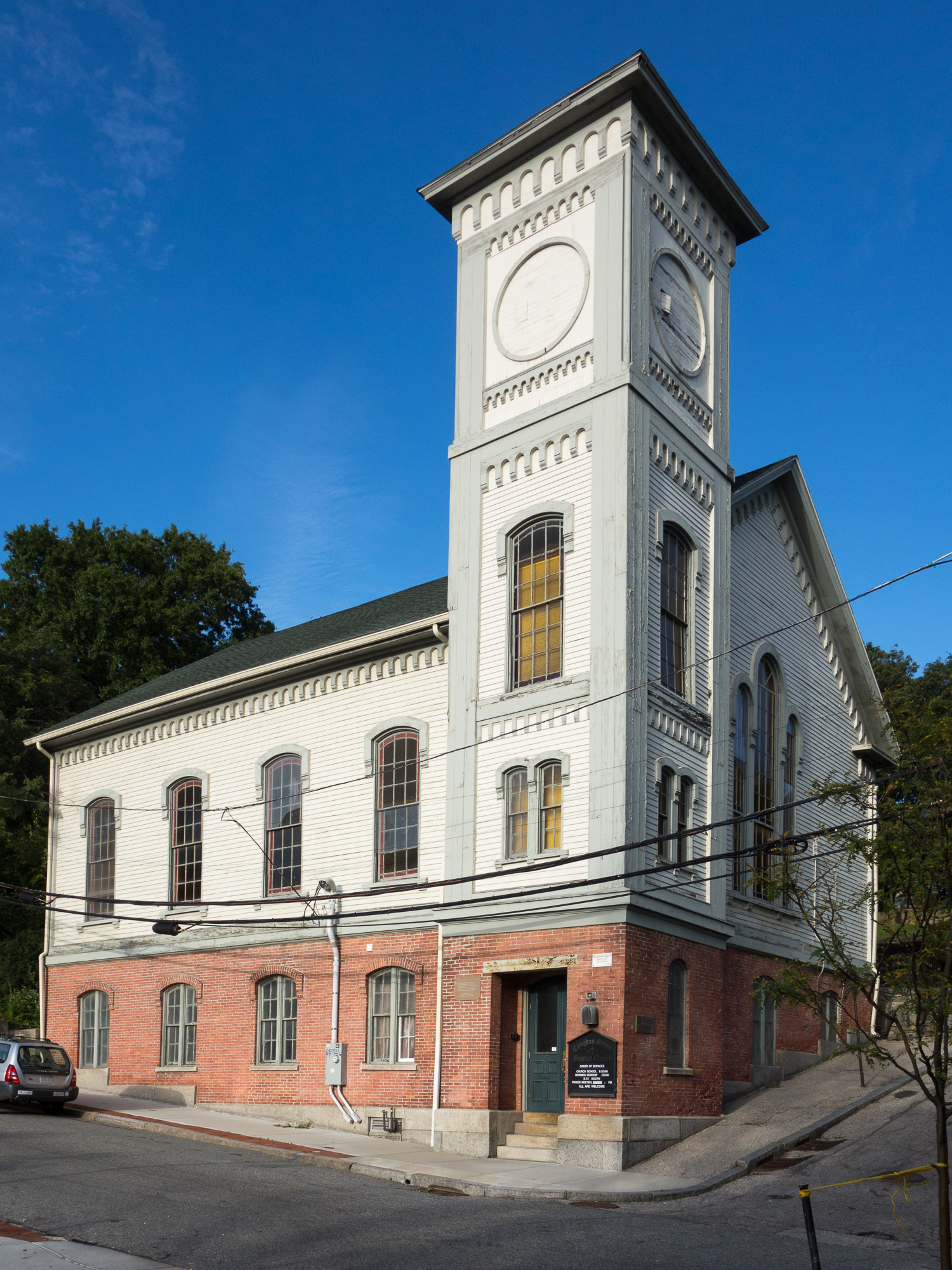
The Congdon Street Baptist Church

In 1968 several students held racial protests on the Brown University campus over the low admittance numbers of Black students and the university's lack of support for the Black students already enrolled. Sixty-five students, about 76% of the total Black student body, walked out in protest and remained in the basement of the Congdon Street Baptist Church until their demand for an increase in admissions was met, raising the proportion of African American students from 2.5% to 11% of the student body. The Rites and Reason Theatre was founded in 1970 by professor George Houston Bass in order to give Black students an outlet to express their diverse racial and cultural traditions and ideas. It was also intended to bring together three communities: university educated professionals, Brown students, and the African American working class, as people in the community were encouraged to become involved in performance. The theatre expanded rapidly and in 1973 it moved to its current location in the Churchill House. Two years later, it was made part of the Africana Studies Department.

Rites and Reason receives funding from external grants, including the Langston Hughes Center for the Arts and the National Endowment for the Arts.

=== George Houston Bass ===
George Houston Bass (1938-1990) son of a preacher, was born in Tennessee. Though he majored in mathematics at Fisk, his love for the arts came to the front as he studied theater and dramatic arts at Yale University. From 1959 to 1963, Bass served as secretary and literary assistant to Langston Hughes, and later became executor of Hughes' estate. In 1981, George Bass founded the Langston Hughes Foundation, and shortly thereafter in 1982 he became the managing editor of The Langston Hughes Review and executive director in 1986. In the 1970s, Bass was hired as an Africana Studies professor at Brown University. At Brown, he was the primary founder of the Rites and Reason Theatre. For Rites and Reason, he also served as a playwright, writing numerous plays including Black Masque and De Day of No Mo.

=== Rhett S. Jones ===
Jones, born in Chicago, Illinois, graduated from Brown University's master program in 1972 and 1976, receiving both a master's degree and a Ph.D. from the Ivy League university. Before getting his masters, he joined the Brown University faculty in 1969 as an associate professor of history and Afro-American studies. He eventually became the research director of Rites and Reason Theatre.

== Location ==
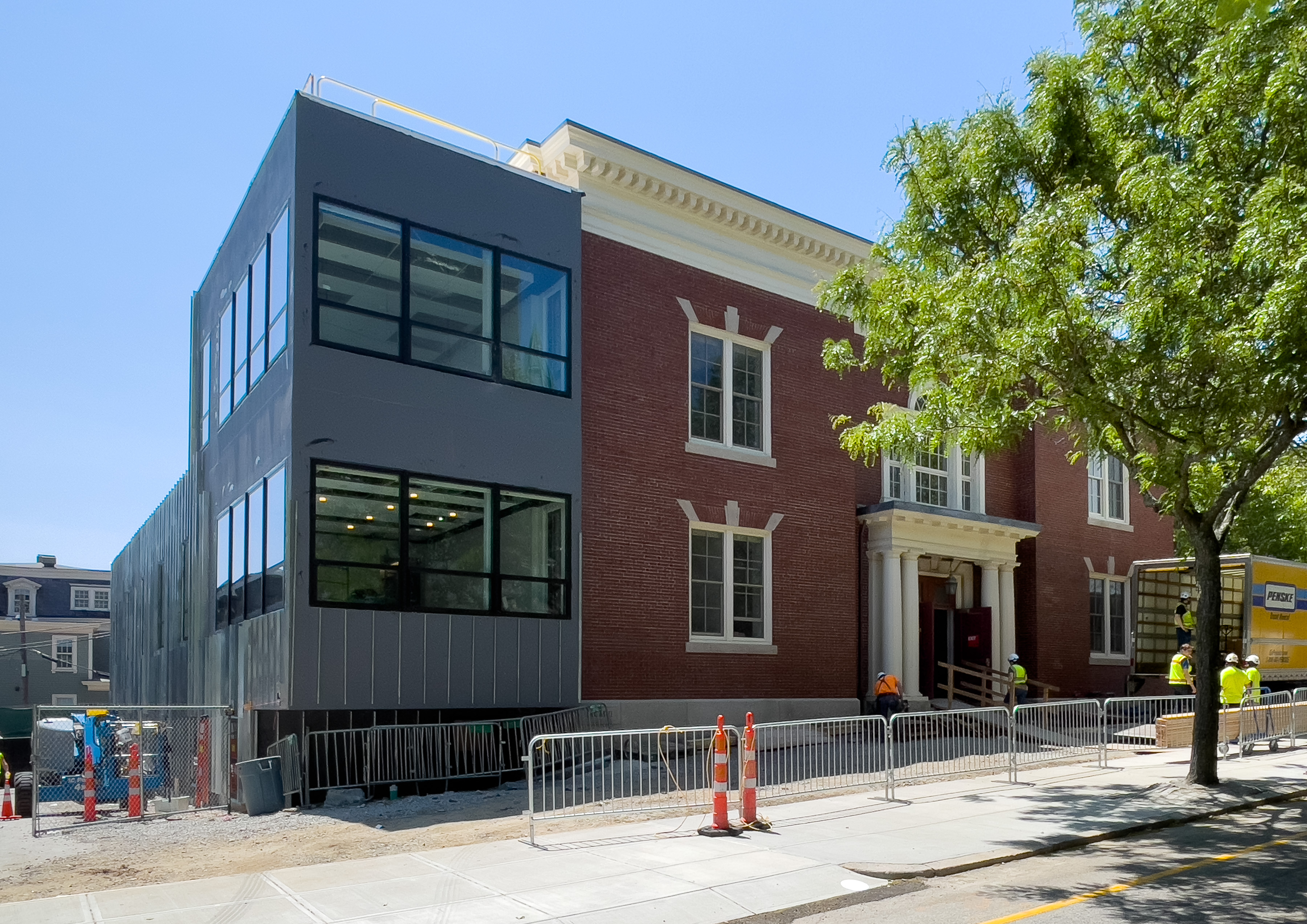
Churchill House at Brown University

Rites and Reason is currently housed at Churchill House, 155 Angell Street on Brown University's campus in Providence, Rhode Island. The building, which was originally built for the Rhode Island Women's Club in 1907, was purchased by Brown University in 1970. By 1972, it became the home for Brown University's Afro-American Society, Africana Studies Program, and the Graduate Minority Association.

The theater was "renovated from the ground up" as part of an expansion of Churchill House in 2022-23. The renovation includes new curtains, seating, and a new lighting system.

== Research-to-Performance Method Writing ==
The Research-to-Performance Method (RPM) is Rites and Reason's signature way of making theater. RPM expanded the typical roles of directors, playwrights, actors, designers, and dramaturgs by setting up playmaking teams and collaborative processes to include scholars, writers, and community persons in creating and developing significant new works. George Houston Bass and Rhett S. Jones began collaborating on the RPM method in 1973. This method was born of a research project called, “Oral History as an Index to Change” which focused on race relations in Providence between 1920 and 1940. This research project inspired a new work known as, The Providence Garden Blues, which opened in April 1975. The success of this work inspired to two men to solidify RPM. Bass and Jones were so committed to the community aspect of RPM that they created a long-standing policy that required all works created through RPM must be presented for the Providence community free of charge.

In their 51st year, Rites and Reason Theatre still uses the Research-to-Performance style for the creation of theatrical works. As of 2017, the Africana Studies Department at Brown University has offered a course every spring semester titled, "RPM Playwriting", where undergraduates learn to use the RPM method to write their own plays. The method has proved to be influential and most current plays produced by Rites and Reason are heavily guided by the RPM method. Most recently, RPM has featured "folkthought", essentially a conversation between audience members and the directorial team that follow the performance. These folkthoughts are ways in which everyone can walk away having learned something, an important principle of RPM.

Outside of Rites and Reason, the Research-to-Performance Method style has been used by well-known artists. Katherine Dunham employed the RPM method when exploring the performance ethnography of Afro-Caribbean and African-American styles of culture and dance.

== Current staff ==
Elmo Terry-Morgan, Artistic Director

Karen Allen Baxter, Managing Director

Alonzo T. Jones, Technical Director

Kathleen Moyer, Production Manager

== Production history ==
The first work developed for Rites and Reason was Black Masque (1971), a play that was written and performed during the 1970–1971 school year Another earlier work performed by Rites and Reason was The Providence Garden Blues (1975). Based on an independent study, students of Professor Rhett S. Jones interviewed African Americans around Providence on the subject of race relations in the city in the early 20th century.

Other works include:

- Every Goodbye Ain't Gone
- Two Wings
- Adrienne Kennedy - Black Children’s Day, Free To die
- George H. Bass - The Articulate Sound of an Articulate Tale, Malacoff Blue, Brer Rabbit Hole, The Blacker the Berry
- P.J. Gibson - Konvergence, Void Passage, Clean Sheets Can’t soil
- Ray Arahna - Lizzie
- Philip Hayes Dean - Mount Hope, Akin
- Rites and Reason - Black Masque
- J.E. Franklin - Where Dewdrops of Mercy Shine Bright
- Barbara Bejoian - Dance, Mama, Dance

Most recent works:

- Ashes, A Journey to Self-Love (2018)
- A Seat at the Table - The Testimony of Fannie Lou Hamer (2017)

== Awards and recognition ==
George Bass received the Rosenthal Award in 1964 awarded by the American Society of Cinematologists. In 1967, Bass's work received the Plaque of the Lion of St. Mare at the Venice Film Festival.

Rites and Reason has garnered support from the Ford Foundation, the National Endowment for the Arts, Chase Foundation, National Endowment for the Humanities, Rhode Island Council for the Humanities, the Rockefeller Foundation, the Rumpler Foundation, and Brown University.
