= St. Teresa Church (Manhattan) =

Church in Manhattan, New York

St. Teresa's Roman Catholic Church (Rutgers Presbyterian Church)
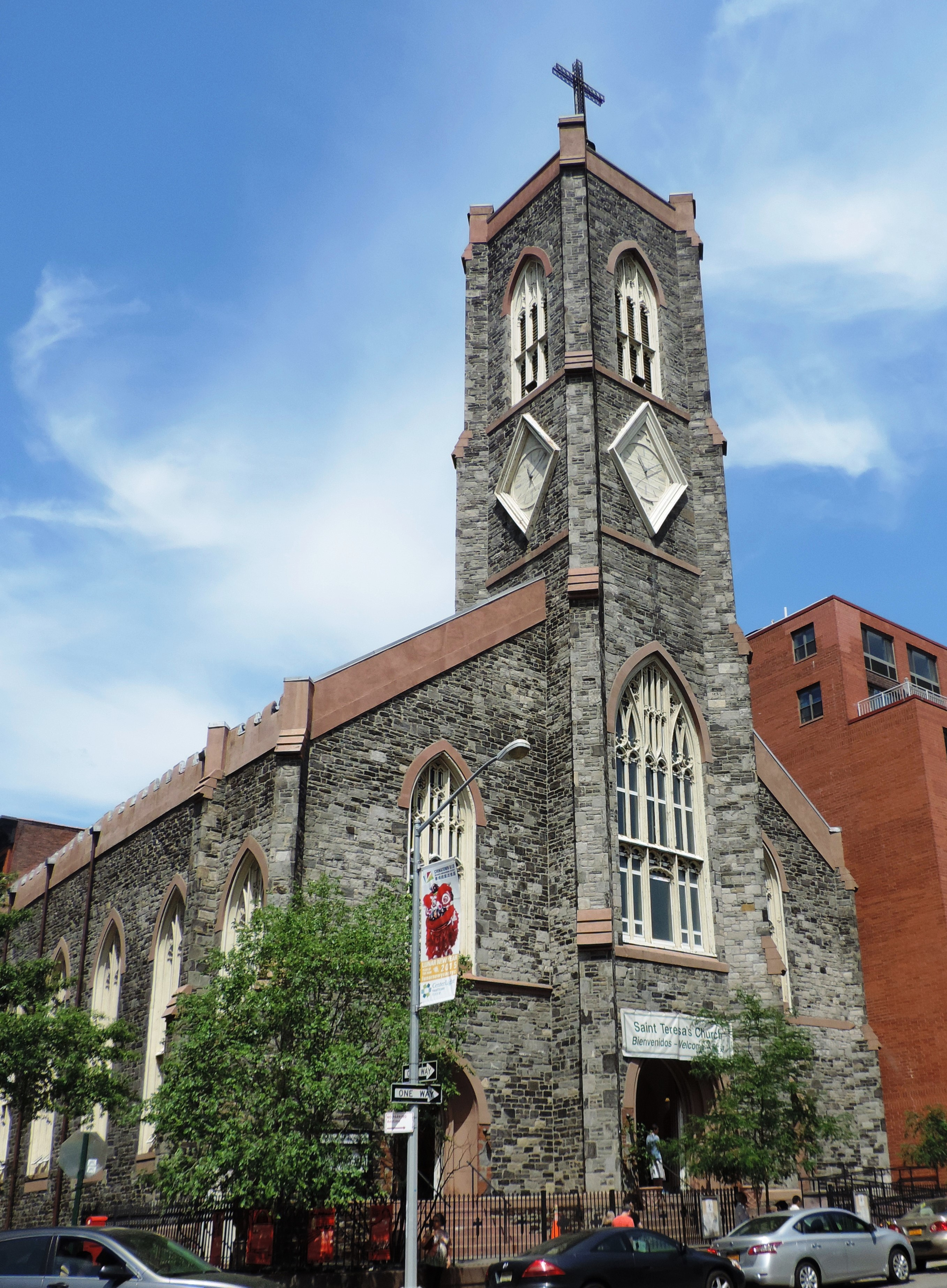
- (2011)
- Interactive map of the St. Teresa's Roman Catholic Church (Rutgers Presbyterian Church) area

General information
- Architectural style: Gothic Revival
- Location: Manhattan, New York City, United States
- Coordinates: 40°42′48.62″N 73°59′25.74″W
- Completed: 1842
- Client: Presbyterian Church in the United States of America

Technical details
- Structural system: brick masonry

Website
- St. Teresa's Roman Catholic Church, Manhattan

The Church of St. Teresa is a Roman Catholic parish located at 16-18 Rutgers Street on the corner of Henry Street on the Lower East Side of Manhattan, New York City. The parish is under the authority of the Archdiocese of New York. The church building was constructed in 1841-42 as the Rutgers Presbyterian Church erected in the Gothic Revival style on a plot of ground donated by Colonel Henry Rutgers. The church is said to have the oldest working public clock in New York City, which has to be hand-wound weekly, a task formerly completed by the artist Bill Dilworth. The church was taken over by St. Teresa's Parish in 1863, three years after it was founded.

A special feature of The New York Times in 1901 mentioned the church among other Catholic structures on the Lower East Side of Manhattan, describing the group "for the most part...limit[ing] themselves to the functions of a parish church, in districts where social needs are otherwise supplied."

The AIA Guide to New York City describes the church as “An ashlar church in the tradition of the others nearby, which antedate 1850. This one conducts services in three languages: English, Spanish and Chinese.”

== Ceiling collapse and renovation ==
In 1995 the interior vaulted ceiling of the church collapsed, and 60,000 pounds of plaster fell, breaking through the floor into the basement parish hall. The congregation worshiped for months in a local synagogue, but eventually found the money to repair the floor so that they could worship in the church, albeit in the basement. Because of the great cost of repairing the roof, it was argued that St. Teresa's should be closed. However, the pastor at the time, Father Dennis Sullivan, and his parishioners were determined that St. Teresa's would not close.

After the school had been condemned and closed in 1942, it had been torn down and eventually become a parking lot, used by the church and neighborhood residents. The late 1990s was a time of rising property values, as New York City began to revitalize and the Lower East Side began to gentrify, so the parish raised the money it needed through the sale of the parking lot and the adjacent air rights. Extensive renovation of the church included a new roof, new interior appointments salvaged from what was left from the old, and the restoration of three murals painted in the 1880s, depicting St. Patrick teaching the pagan kings of Ireland, St. Teresa teaching her sisters and the crucifixion of Christ. The church was reopened in the early winter of 2002 and rededicated by Edward Cardinal Egan, the Archbishop of New York, in early 2003.

Monsignor Sullivan left St. Teresa's in July 2003 and was followed by Father Donald Baker who served as pastor from 2003 to 2015, followed by Father Jose Serrano. Father Alexis Bastidas is their current pastor.
