= Black Girl (1972 film) =

1972 American film directed by Ossie Davis

- Directed by: Ossie Davis
- Screenplay by: J.E. Franklin
- Based on: Black Girl; 1971 play by J. E. Franklin
- Produced by: Robert H. Greenberg; Lee Savin
- Starring: Peggy Pettitt; Leslie Uggams; Brock Peters; Ruby Dee; Claudia McNeil
- Cinematography: Glenwood J. Swanson
- Edited by: Graham Lee Mahin
- Music by: Ed Bogas; Ray Shanklin
- Distributed by: Cinerama Releasing Corporation
- Release date: November 9, 1972
- Running time: 97 minutes
- Country: United States
- Language: English

Black Girl is a 1972 American drama film with a screenplay by J.E. Franklin, based on her 1969 play, and directed by Ossie Davis. The film explores issues and experiences of black womanhood in the 1970s, including how black women were depicted and common stereotypes of the period. According to Melvin Donalson in Black Directors in Hollywood, "Black Girl is a film that explores the intricate and sometimes painful connections between mothers and daughters."

== Plot ==
Protagonist Billie Jean lives in a cramped house with her mother Rosie, her grandmother Mu'Dear, her two older sisters, Norma Faye and Ruth Ann, and Mu'Dear's live-in boyfriend, Herbert. She desperately wishes to avoid the fate of Norma Faye and Ruth Ann, both of whom are high school dropouts and single mothers. Billie Jean dreams of becoming a successful dancer, but her mother and sisters belittle her attempts to improve herself. Billie Jean has dropped out of school herself and taken a job as a dancer/waitress at the seedy Groovy Bar and Grill in order to earn enough money to buy Rosie a new and larger house.

Rosie's ex-husband Earl, a shoe businessman from Detroit, comes to visit the family with hopes to rekindle a relationship with Rosie. Earl treats Billie Jean differently than her older sisters because she is not his daughter, and he crudely suggests Billie Jean can make it on her own by dancing in a bar in Detroit. Earl and Rosie visit a nearby neighborhood park, where they reminisce on their younger days and their bittersweet past. Earl suggests Rosie come back with him to Detroit, but Rosie turns him down and they part company. Back at home, Rosie and Mu'Dear discuss the old wounds which Earl's visit has reopened.

Rosie compares her daughters unfavorably with her high-achieving foster daughter Netta, whose mother suffers from mental illness. When Netta comes home from college to visit Rosie for Mother's Day, Norma Faye and Ruth Ann resent their mother's doting on her and they trick Billie Jean into believing Netta will move into her room once she graduates from college. The day before Mother's Day, Netta comes to the house to visit Rosie, but only her daughters are home and they mock and insult her, especially Norma Faye, who goes so far as to pull a knife on Netta. Despite this unpleasant encounter (which Rosie knows nothing about), Netta makes plans for Billie Jean to return to high school and apply to college at the end of the school year.

When Rosie prepares to call the truant officer on Billie Jean, Norma Faye and Ruth Ann wrestle Billie Jean down to the living room floor and insist that she be put in reform school as they continue to dismiss her goal to go to college and become a dancer. Mu'Dear breaks up the sisters' tussle, reminds Rosie of her past dreams, and tells her, Norma Faye and Ruth Ann to allow Billie Jean to fulfill her dreams without interference. The film ends with Billie Jean leaving home to attend college despite the protests of her sisters.

== Cast ==
- Brock Peters as Earl
- Claudia McNeil as Mu'Dear
- Leslie Uggams as Netta
- Louise Stubbs as Mama Rosie
- Peggy Pettitt as Billie Jean
- Gloria Edwards as Norma Faye
- Loretta Greene as Ruth Ann
- Ruby Dee as Netta's Mother

== Production ==
In 1971, Franklin worked on a feature-film adaptation of her play, Black Girl, for a very small advance. The experience of making and marketing the film was an unhappy one for Franklin. Although the producer, Lee Savin, promised that Woodie King Jr. would be involved in the project, King was dropped. She urged the director to hire Shauneille Perry as an assistant, but he did not. While she managed to get them to hire Peggy Pettit, rather than "a light-bright-damned-near-white actress", to play Billie Jean, against her wishes they cast Claudia McNeil, who had been in the 1961 film A Raisin in the Sun, as Mu'Dear. Scenes were re-written and re-arranged by the director, and her voiceover to cover up a "ridiculous" scene between Mu'Dear and Mr. Herbert was never recorded. Even more egregiously, "Efforts were made early in the filming to exploit material for sex and violence," she said. Franklin tried to have a scene where the young female character of Billie Jean disrobes in front of the camera removed; it stayed in the film, albeit without nudity. The poster for the film "showed a blow-up of Norma Faye's face, teeth snarling in mad-dog fashion, threatening Billie Jean with a knife. A moment which had lasted only five seconds had been lifted from the film to represent the supposed essence of the entire play.... This was blatant misrepresentation." After Franklin threatened to register her disapproval at every newspaper or television interview and speaking engagement, "In the next few days the illustration appeared without the knife. I thought that was the end of the matter; but a week later the knife was back." Finally, "voice-overs had been used to erase all "fucks" to make the film eligible for a PG rating. ... I was urged not to mention to anyone that these cuts had been made, as people might think that they had missed something." The film was released in 1972. It had its world premiere at the Strand Theatre (Manhattan), then known as the Penthouse Theater on Broadway, to benefit sickle cell anemia.

== Feminism ==
Davis was not afraid to focus on realistic and sometimes uncomfortable issues. A central theme of his was the depiction of black women in that period. Black Girl was released "against the backdrop of the surging feminist movement in the early 1970s".

Davis explores the women's liberation movement that occurred contemporaneous to the Black Power movement through the characters' stories, especially that of Mama Rosie as a single black mother struggling to support her family while refusing to allow her ex-husband to save her. "Davis gave notice that working-class black women—who were not prostitutes, drug users, or gun-toting heroines—had stories to tell that were provocative and relevant."

The role of black women in films was changing. "The role of black women in films, always previously confined to servant roles, with only white-looking women being allowed to be sexually alluring (and sinful), did not reflect their status in the black community."

== Blaxploitation ==
Blaxploitation films in the 1970s exploited the stereotypes of African Americans in the roles they played. The genre promoted popular images of black men and women using traits of extraordinary cool, sexuality, and violence. Black Girl embraces some of these traits, in depicting the sexuality of the older sisters, and in a violent scene where the oldest sister pulls a knife on Netta, the foster sister. Roger Ebert stated that in Black Girl "we see a black family with more depth and complexity than the movies usually permit"

== Reception ==
Melvin Donalson wrote: "Studios were perhaps unenthusiastic about marketing a film that explored emotional and psychological dimensions of black womanhood, and perhaps audiences were still hungry for the trendy black urban action films that dominated the period." Roger Ebert of the Chicago Sun-Times rated it three out of four stars and wrote, "Black Girl is a movie so filled with things it wants to say that sometimes the messages are lost in a confusion of storylines. A more disciplined movie might have been made by eliminating some of the material and organizing the rest, but I'm not sure it would have been a better movie or a more moving experience." Roger Greenspun of The New York Times described it as "a poor movie that makes it look as if there never had been a good play" and said that "I suspect that the real difference between the successful play and the failed movie lies in Ossie Davis's direction, which ranges from pedestrian to downright helpless." Variety quoted their review, which called it "the best study of Negro family life since Lorraine Hansberry's A Raisin in the Sun".

== See also ==
- List of American films of 1972
