= Sounds of the City =

American radio soap opera (1973–1975)

Sounds of the City was an American radio soap opera that ran from 1973 to 1975. The series, written and directed by Shauneille Perry, centered on the Taylors, a Black family who fled segregation in the South to begin a new life in Chicago, and the developing crises in their personal lives. It was touted by Jet magazine as the first Black radio soap opera.

== History ==
Sounds of the City was produced by advertising agency UniWorld Group and sponsored by the Quaker Oats Company. It was distributed by the Mutual Black Network. Shauneille Perry, who wrote the scripts, told Jet that she aimed to "present a true picture of Black life in this country."

Byron Lewis, the president of UniWorld, said that persuading radio stations to air a soap opera was difficult, as many were skeptical of radio dramas, but ultimately convinced them it could help sell products to Black homemakers. 25 radio stations initially agreed to play it; the first to sign on was WJPC in Chicago. The series ran five days per week and was 15 minutes long. Upon attending a premiere, Illinois state senator Cecil A. Partee praised the series: "This is perhaps what America needs to see. America needs to see us in all of our roles. We've only been seen in limited ones."

Robert Guillaume and Zaida Coles starred as husband and wife Calvin and Winona Taylor, and Helen Martin played Winona's mother Eula. Calvin, a policeman, struggles to reconcile his personal views with his job, while Winona grappled with marital problems and her approaching middle age. Other guest actors included Robert Hooks, Ruby Dee, and Adam Wade.

Sounds of the City would ultimately run on 30 stations, and lasted for two years. The New York Times credited the soap opera with rescuing the foundering agency; the series helped UniWorld earn its first million dollars in gross sales.
