= Peggy Pettitt =

American dramatist

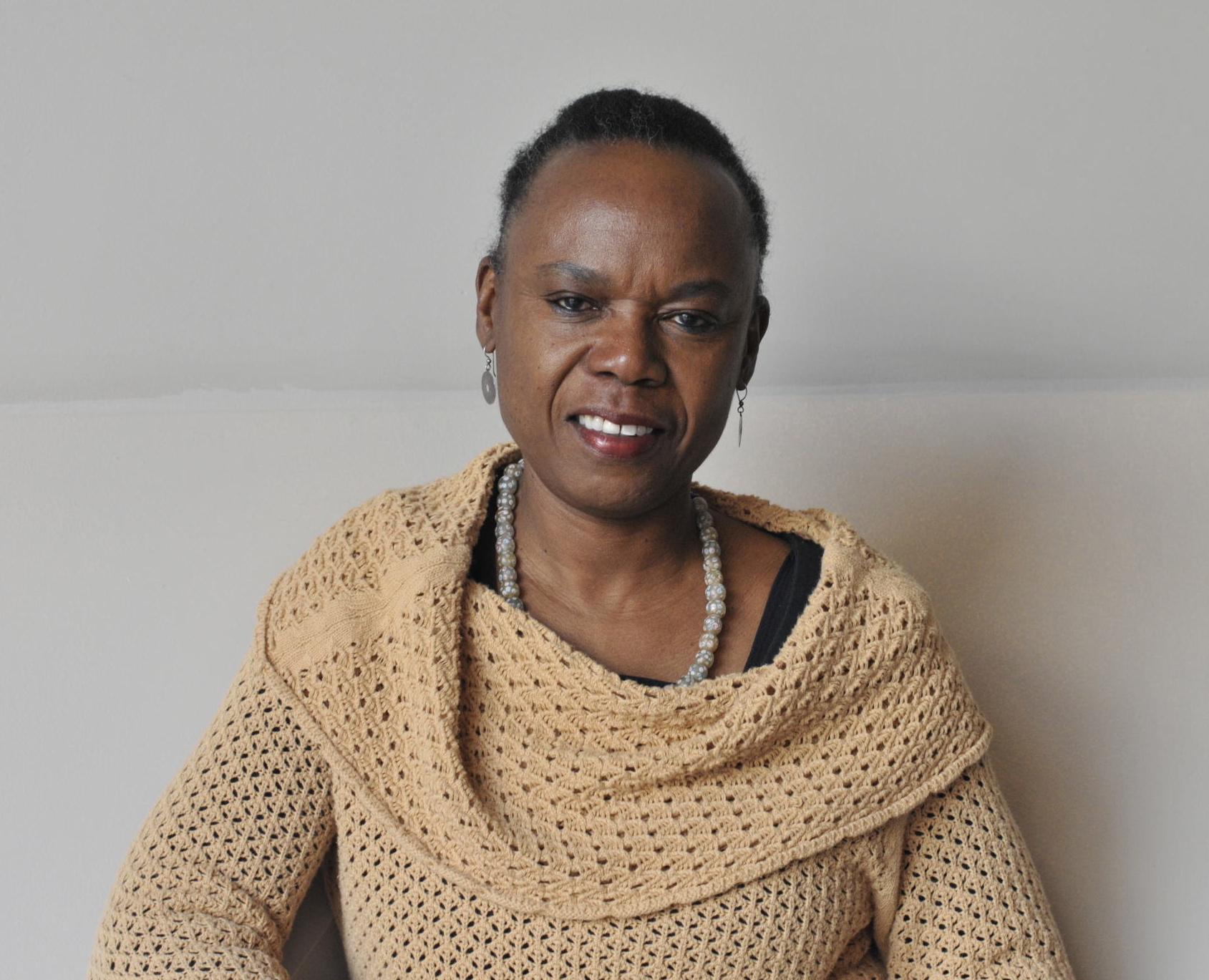
- Pettitt, 2013.
- Born: February 8, 1950 (age 76); St. Louis, Missouri, U.S.
- Occupations: Actress; dancer; playwright
- Years active: 1969–present
- Known for: Billie Jean – Black Girl
- Spouse: Rémy Tissier (m. 1982)

Peggy Pettitt (born February 8, 1950) is an American actress, dancer, teacher, and playwright. Pettitt is best known for her role as Billie Jean in Black Girl (1972), alongside Brock Peters and Claudia McNeil.

== Career ==
=== Playwriting ===
The centerpiece of Pettitt's theater career is a unique style of solo performance rooted in African-American storytelling. She developed this form to portray a spectrum of characters. Related by blood and circumstance, these characters shed light on the multifaceted history of African American men and women. And they tell "stories addressing important issues of our time." In collaboration with director Remy Tissier, she has created over 10 original full-length plays. These examine issues of domestic violence, sexual abuse, cross-generational differences, voting registration, the Civil Rights Movement, identity and the world HIV/Aids crisis. Titles include Women Preachers, Caught Between the Devil and The Deep Blue Sea, Tricksters: All Over You Like White On Rice, Wrapped Up, Tied Up and Tangled, Mollie Oil BETWIXT, Wild Steps and In The Spirit For Real.

One play was the product of her 2000-01 Fulbright Fellowship to Senegal: The Spirit Factor. An original play, it's based on the living history and the art of storytelling in West Africa. Another play, Voyage, was presented at the Avignon Off Festival in 2010. It explores American history through both the blues and a spiritual heritage that lives along the Mississippi River but originated in West Africa. Pettitt has presented her work at the Saint-Laurent-du-Maroni Les Rencontres du Bout des Mondes International Festival in 2011 (French Guiana). In addition to the Fulbright Fellowship, she has received numerous other grants and awards. These include grants from the National Endowment for the Arts and the New York Foundation for the Arts. Pearls of Wisdom is a storytelling ensemble of the Elders Share the Arts in N.Y. City. Pettitt is its founding artistic director, and with the Pearls of Wisdom, she was inducted in 2007 into City Lore's People's Hall of Fame.

=== Acting ===
In 1972, during the era of Blaxploitation movies, Pettitt starred in Black Girl, her first feature film. Pettitt was nominated for Best Actress by the NAACP for her role in Black Girl, written by J.E. Franklin (from her 1969 WGBH (Boston) teleplay and her 1971 play), and directed by Ossie Davis. Another of her noteworthy roles was at Lincoln Center as Miss Lindsey in Mule Bone, Zora Neale Hurston and Langston Hughes’ historical comedy.

In 2026, Pettitt, along with Lizzie Olesker and Louise Smith, performed an original production at Touchstone Theatre titled Language of Dolls.

=== Teaching ===
Pettitt has professional experience and training in directing and storytelling workshops. She teaches a step-by-step process of creating, writing and performing original material. Partnering with a wide array of organizations, she has helped scores of diverse groups present their own original stories as both theater and storytelling performances. She also works extensively with drama therapists, social workers and educators in public schools.

Both in the U.S. and abroad, Pettitt has worked at numerous schools and educational institutions. Her teaching experience extends to facilities such as homeless shelters, prisons, drug treatment centers, VA hospitals, and senior and adolescent centers. Additionally she has ample experience working with the emotionally and physically disabled and their families. She currently teaches self-scripting at New York University's Experimental Theatre Wing.

== Personal life ==
In 1974, after earning a BA from Antioch College, she moved to London on a Thomas J. Watson Fellowship. Pettitt now resides in New York City. She has been married since 1982 to writer, director and painter Rémy Tissier.

== Awards and honors ==
- 2008, Story gatherer for "Another River Flows" recipient of the Pennsylvania Human Relation Award
- 2010, Voyage was presented at the Avignon, France Off Festival
- Nominated for an NAACP Image Award for role in Black Girl
- 2007, Ms. Pettitt and the Pearls of Wisdom were inducted into New York City Lore's People's Hall of Fame
- Recipient of New York City's Arts In Education Roundtable Award for sustained achievement in theater
- Honored by the William Hodson Senior Center, The Roundtable Senior Center and Elders Share the Arts for "Commitment to the art of storytelling that transforms lives and communities"
- 2011, Performance Space 122 founders and board pioneers Shining Star Award

== In books ==
- Out of Character, Mark Russell, 1997
- Performing Democracy, Susan Chandler Haedicke, 2004
- Mapping Memories, Pam Schweitzer, 2004
- Local Acts, An International Anthology, Jan Cohen Cruz, 2005
- Ensemble Works, An Anthology, Ferdinand Lewis, 2005
- Reminiscence Theatre: Making Theatre from Memory, Pam Schweitzer, 2007
- Forget Memory: Creating Better Lives For People With Dementia, Ann Basting, 2009.
