= Langston Hughes Society =

The Langston Hughes Society is a United States–based literary society concerned with the work of African American poet Langston Hughes. The society was the first national organization to be dedicated to the work of an African American writer. Founded after the poet's death and in the wake of the Langston Hughes Study conference of 1981 by Hughes' literary assistant George Houston Bass, the society's official publication is the Langston Hughes Review, published by Institute for African American Studies at The University of Georgia. The organisation also presents the Langston Hughes Award annually.
