= Nathan K. McGill =

American lawyer

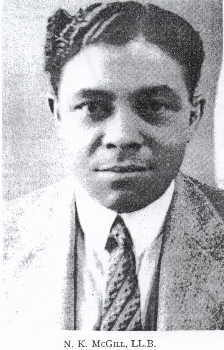
- Portrait of Chicago-based attorney Nathan K. McGill
- Born: Nathan Kellogg McGill; November 29, 1888; Quincy, Florida
- Died: May 7, 1946 (aged 57); Chicago, Illinois
- Education: Cookman Institute; Boston University School of Law (LL.B.) (1912)
- Occupation: Attorney
- Spouses: Idalee Thornton (divorced): Beatrice H. Stiles
- Children: Nathan Kellogg McGill, Jr. Simuel Decatur McGill II; Winston Beecher McGill

Nathan K. McGill (1888–1946) was the first African American to serve as assistant attorney general for the State of Illinois. He was also the first African American appointed to the Chicago Library Board.

== Biography ==
Nathan Kellogg McGill was born in Quincy, Florida on November 29, 1888 (some sources indicate November 29, 1880), the son of Nathan and Agnes (Zeigler) McGill.

After graduating from Cookman Institute, McGill studied at Boston University School of Law. In 1912, he began his career as a lawyer, first in Jacksonville, Florida, then to Chicago, where he spent most of his adult life.

From 1925 to 1934, McGill served as secretary and general counsel for Robert S. Abbott Publishing Company, publishers of the Chicago Defender. At the Defender he was nicknamed ""Little Napoleon"" because he managed the newspaper with authority.

He was also an assistant state's attorney for Cook County, Illinois from 1925 to 1926.

In 1929, he became the first African American to serve as assistant attorney general for the State of Illinois. He served in that capacity until 1933.

He died at his home in Chicago on May 7, 1946. McGill was buried in Jacksonville, Florida.

== Awards and recognition ==
- Who's Who in Colored America
