= UWG Inc. =

American advertising agency

- Formerly: UniWorld Group, Inc.
- Type: Private
- Industry: Advertising
- Headquarters: New York City, New York
- Key people: Monique L. Nelson (CEO)
- Owner: Lori-Laine Holdings (51%); WPP Group (49%)
- Divisions: UniWorld Group Advertising; UniWorld Group Healthcare; UniWorld Group Hispanic; UniWorld Films
- Website: www.uwginc.com

UWG Inc. is a full-service advertising agency headquartered in Brooklyn, New York, with satellite offices in Atlanta, Detroit, Miami, and Los Angeles. It is the longest-standing multicultural ad agency in the United States, founded in 1969. In 2014, the company rebranded itself as UWG.

Some of its current and past clients include Lincoln-Mercury, Ford Motor Company, CVS Pharmacy, Marriott International, U.S. Marine Corps, AT&T, and Burger King.

== History ==
UniWorld Group was founded in 1969 by Byron Lewis, who pioneered the concept of multicultural advertising. The company conceptualised the marketing campaign for the 1971 "blaxploitation" film Shaft. The company was credited for popularizing Shaft by using the rhetoric of black power.

In 1974, the company created a radio soap opera that centered on the post-Great Migration and African Americans settling in the Northern United States, entitled Sounds of the City. The soap opera helped the company earn its first million dollars in gross sales. The company started creating TV commercials in 1975. Its first television advertisements were for Avon, a cosmetic company.

In 1997, the company launched UniWorld Entertainment, a production company that developed national TV specials. The company has also handled publicity for films such as A Bronx Tale (1993), Amistad (1997), Boyz n the Hood (1991), Glory (1989), Malcolm X (1992), Shaft (1971), Shaft's Big Score (1973), and Shaft in Africa (1973).

UniWorld did Burger King's minority advertising in the '80s and '90s. In 2000, WPP plc acquired a 49% stake in UniWorld Group for an undisclosed amount of sum.

In 2012, Monique Nelson and her family acquired the majority stake and were appointed chair and CEO of the company. In 2014, UniWorld Group changed its name to UWG. Some of the notable clients that UWG served include CVS Pharmacy, Marriott International, U.S. Marine Corps, Gatorade, AT&T, Mars, Incorporated, Amtrak, Smirnoff Vodka, Colgate-Palmolive, Texaco, Lincoln-Mercury, and Ford Motor Co.

== Awards and recognition ==
UWG has been ranked multiple times in Black Enterprise magazine: #16 on their Industrial/Service 100 (1994), Advertising Agency of the Year (2000); #5 in Advertising Agencies (2011); and #8 in black-owned ad companies in the United States (2014). The Association of National Advertisers has given the company Multicultural Excellence Awards in 2010, 2012, and 2017.

The company's founder, Byron Lewis, was inducted into the Advertising Hall of Fame by the American Advertising Federation (AAF) in 2013.

Other awards and nominations include: Communications Excellence to Black Audiences (CEBA) awards (1983) and the APAC Effie Awards Gold Award in United States Multicultural & Lifestyle Segments – the multimedia 'Real Talk' ad campaign produced for the United States Marine Corps (2010).
