= Donald P. Ryder =

American architect (1926–2021)

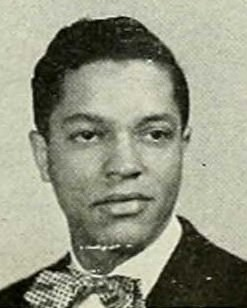
- Donald Porter Ryder at University of Illinois (1951)
- Born: Donald Porter Ryder; August 28, 1926; Springfield, Ohio, U.S.
- Died: February 17, 2021 (aged 94); New Rochelle, New York, U.S.
- Education: University of Illinois
- Occupations: Architect, educator
- Known for: Commemorative public architecture
- Spouse: Shauneille Gantt Perry
- Children: 3

Donald Porter Ryder, FAIA, NOMA (August 28, 1926 – February 17, 2021) was an American architect and educator. He designed many buildings as the co-founder of Bond Ryder & Associates with J. Max Bond Jr., and was a professor emeritus at the City College of New York where he taught from 1972 to 2001.

== Life and career ==
Donald Porter Ryder was born on August 28, 1926 in Springfield, Ohio, as the second of three children of (Emma) Marie (née Belsinger) and Earl Ryder. His was apparently named Donald after his father's first cousin Donald H. Ryder (1893-1916) and Porter from his paternal grandmother's maiden name. His father was a chemist and his mother a homemaker. While still an infant, the family moved to Dayton, Ohio. His mother died when Donald was only eight years old.

Ryder's paternal great-grandparents James and Susan (née Hardiman) Ryder were free persons of color and listed by name in the 1860 U.S. Census in Gibson County, Indiana.

He graduated with a BA degree in architecture from the University of Illinois in 1951.

Ryder's principal works include, the Towers on the Park apartments on Frederick Douglass Circle (1990) in Manhattan, Battery Pointe and The Soundings Apartments on Rector Place (1987) in Battery Park City, Manhattan, the Schomburg Center for Research in Black Culture (1978) in Manhattan, as well as the Martin Luther King Jr. Center for Social Change (1981) in Atlanta.
