= George Houston Bass =

American playwright, director and writer (1938–1990)

- Born: April 23, 1938; Murfreesboro, Tennessee, U.S.
- Died: September 18, 1990 (aged 52); Providence, Rhode Island, U.S.
- Education: Fisk University
- Occupations: Playwright, director and writer

George Houston Bass (April 23, 1938 – September 18, 1990) was an American playwright, director and writer. He lived and worked in Providence, Rhode Island. He founded the Rites and Reason Theater at Brown University in September 1970. He was also the literary secretary to and the executor of the literary estate of poet Langston Hughes. Bass founded the Langston Hughes Society in 1981 and the society's publication, the Langston Hughes Review, in 1982.

Bass is credited with writing the arrangement of the folk song "Sea Lion Woman" popularized by Nina Simone in 1964. A 1965 letter from Hughes supports this by referencing "my former secretary's SEA LION WOMAN [Nina] is featuring live on every concert".

== Awards ==
- Harlem Cultural Council Award, 1969.
