= A Raisin in the Sun (1961 film) =

1961 film by Daniel Petrie

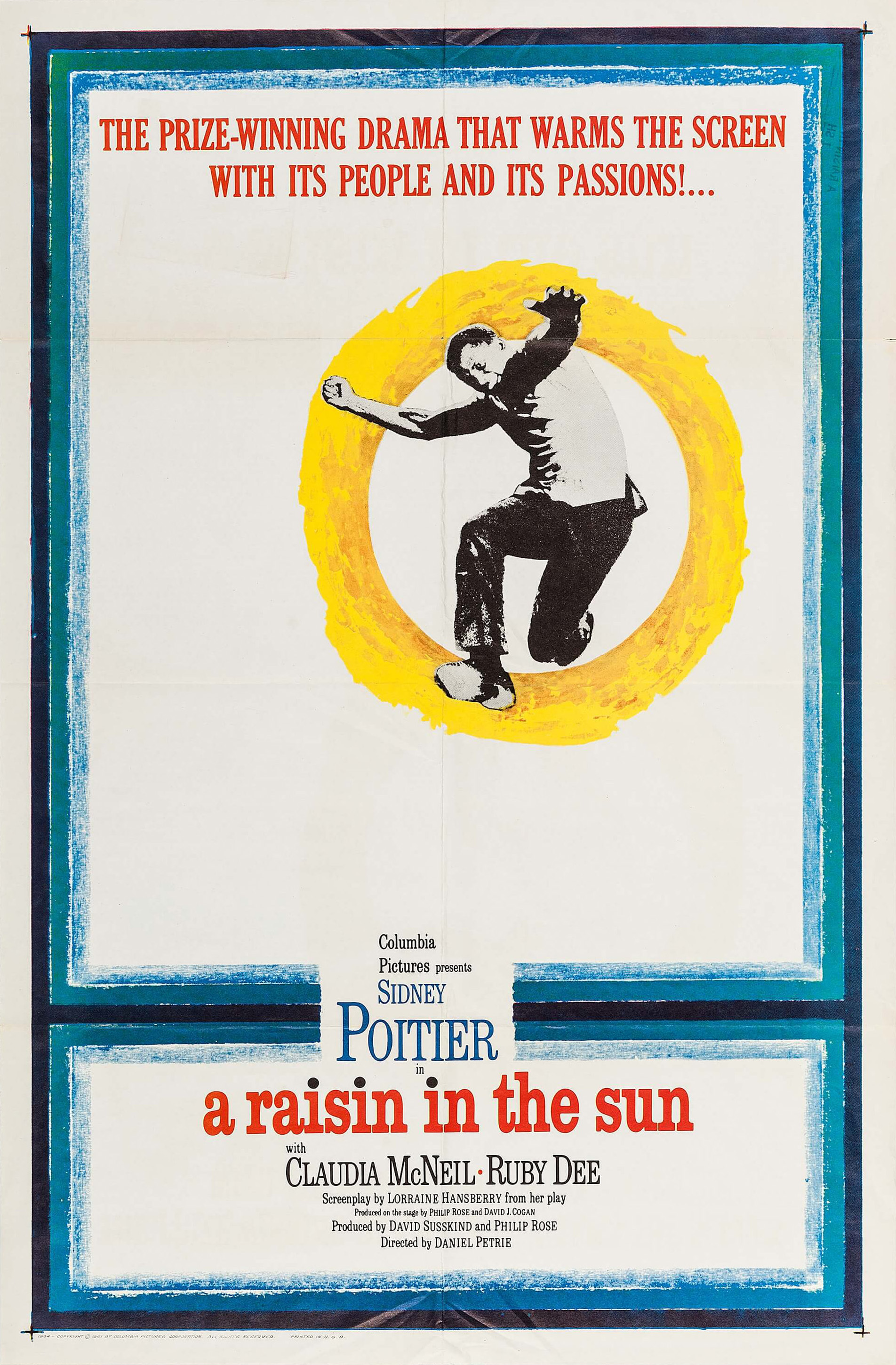
- Theatrical release poster
- Directed by: Daniel Petrie
- Screenplay by: Lorraine Hansberry
- Based on: A Raisin in the Sun by Lorraine Hansberry
- Produced by: Philip Rose; David Susskind
- Starring: Sidney Poitier; Ruby Dee; Claudia McNeil; Diana Sands; Stephen Perry
- Cinematography: Charles Lawton Jr.
- Edited by: William A. Lyon; Paul Weatherwax
- Music by: Laurence Rosenthal
- Distributed by: Columbia Pictures
- Release date: May 29, 1961
- Running time: 128 minutes
- Country: United States
- Language: English
- Budget: $1.5 million
- Box office: $1.3 million

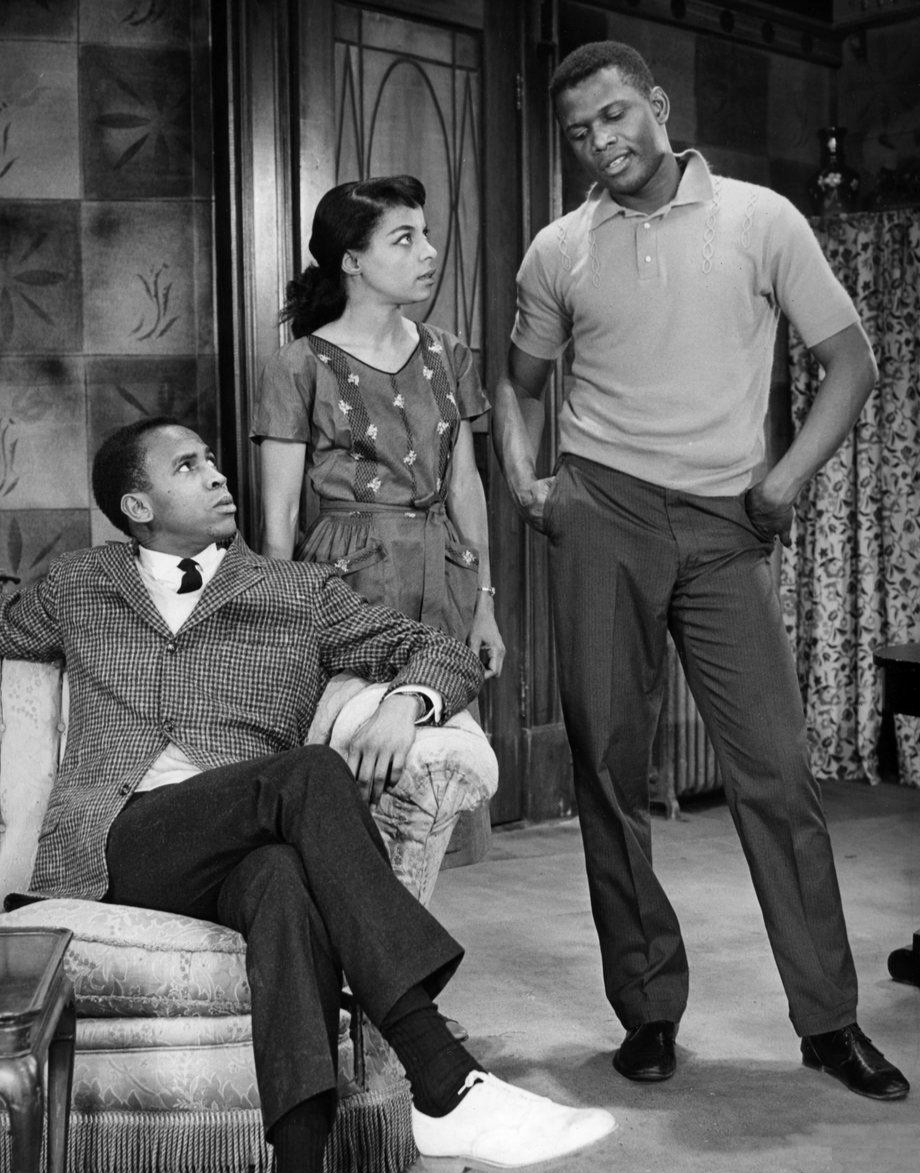
A Raisin in the Sun, from left, Louis Gossett Jr, Ruby Dee, and Sidney Poitier.

A Raisin in the Sun is a 1961 American drama film directed by Daniel Petrie, and starring Sidney Poitier, Ruby Dee, Claudia McNeil, Diana Sands, Roy Glenn, and Louis Gossett Jr. (in his film debut), and based on the 1958 play of the same name by Lorraine Hansberry, which was not published until 1959. It follows an African-American family that wants a better life away from Chicago. A Raisin in the Sun was released by Columbia Pictures on May 29, 1961.

In 2005, the film was selected for preservation in the United States National Film Registry by the Library of Congress as being "culturally, historically, or aesthetically significant". In 2006, the American Film Institute ranked the film 65th in its list of most inspiring films.

== Plot ==
Members of the Younger family are anticipating a life insurance check in the amount of $10,000 and each of them has an idea as to what he or she would like to do with the money. Matriarch Lena Younger wants to buy a house to fulfill the dream she shared with her deceased husband. Walter Lee, her son (and also a limousine driver), would rather use the money to invest in a liquor store (including bribery to obtain the license), believing the income would put an end to the family's financial woes. Ruth, Walter's wife, wanting to provide more space and better opportunities for her young son Travis, agrees with Lena. Beneatha, Lena's daughter, would like to use the money to pay her medical school tuition.

Lena spends $3,500 for a down payment on a house in the white neighborhood of Clybourne Park, and despite being agitated many times by Walter, gives him the remaining $6,500 and tells him to save $3,000 of it for Beneatha's medical school and take the remaining $3,500 for his own investments. Meanwhile, Ruth discovers she is pregnant and, fearing another child will add to the financial pressures, considers having an abortion, even making a down payment for it. Walter voices no objection, but Lena is strongly against it, saying "I thought we gave children life, not take it away from them".

Beneatha, an aficionado of African history and culture, rejects her suitor George, believing he is blind to the problems of their race. Her Nigerian classmate Joseph Asagai proposes to her, wanting to take her to Africa with him after they finish school, but she is unsure what to do.

When their future neighbors find out the Youngers are moving in, they send Mark Lindner (known as Karl in the play) from the Clybourne Park Improvement Association to offer them money in return for staying away, but they refuse. Meanwhile, Walter loses the insurance money, including the money meant for Beneatha's medical school, when one of his "partners" in the liquor store scheme, Willy Harris, skips town with the money.

Desperate, Walter offers to take Lindner up on his offer to take money to stay out of Clybourne Park, even while his family begs him not to sell away their dignity. When Lindner arrives, Walter has a last-minute change of heart and rejects Lindner's offer, giving a speech about how the family had fought racist oppression for five generations, and will continue with the sixth generation, Travis. The Youngers eventually move out of their apartment, fulfilling their dream. The future seems uncertain and slightly dangerous, but they believe that they can succeed through optimism, determination, and remaining together as a family.

== Cast ==
- Sidney Poitier as Walter Lee Younger
- Ruby Dee as Ruth Younger
- Claudia McNeil as Lena Younger
- Diana Sands as Beneatha Younger
- Stephen Perry as Travis Younger
- John Fiedler as Mark Lindner
- Ivan Dixon as Joseph Asagai
- Louis Gossett Jr. as George Murchison
- Joel Fluellen as "Bobo"
- Roy Glenn as Willie Harris
- Louis Terrel as Herman

== Awards and reception ==
On the review aggregator website Rotten Tomatoes, 91% of 53 critics' reviews are positive. The website's consensus reads: "Led by a masterful performance from Sidney Poitier, A Raisin in the Sun expertly blends social commentary with pure entertainment." On Metacritic, the film has a weighted average score of 87 out of 100 based on 5 critics, which the site labels as "universal acclaim".

Ruby Dee won the National Board of Review Award for Best Supporting Actress. Both Poitier and McNeil were nominated for Golden Globe Awards, and director Petrie received a special "Gary Cooper Award" at the 1961 Cannes Film Festival.

Claudia McNeil received rave reviews for her performance and was nominated for the Golden Globe Award for Best Actress in a Motion Picture – Drama and the BAFTA Award for Best Actress in a Leading Role.

American Film Institute

- AFI's 100 Years...100 Cheers - #65

== See also ==
- List of American films of 1961
