= Phillip Hayes Dean =

American stage actor and playwright (1931–2014)

- Born: January 17, 1931; Chicago, Illinois, U.S.
- Died: April 14, 2014 (aged 83); Los Angeles, California, U.S.
- Occupations: Actor and playwright

Phillip Hayes Dean (January 17, 1931 – April 14, 2014) was an American stage actor and playwright.

== Career ==
Dean won the Drama Desk Award for most promising playwright in the 1971-72 season for his play The Sty of the Blind Pig. A 1971 New York Times review of the same play, by Clive Barnes, after a performance at St Mark's Playhouse, described it as not a "perfect play" but "yet nags with its truth."

His later play, Paul Robeson, aroused controversy upon its premiere in 1977. This was due to its depiction of Paul Robeson garnering criticism from Robeson’s family and other prominent intellectuals, who claimed that the play's portrait of the singer was historically inaccurate.

== Death ==
Hayes died on April 14, 2014, aged 83, in Los Angeles, California from an aortic aneurysm.
