= St. Augustine's Church (Manhattan) =

Church in Manhattan, New York

- St. Augustine's Chapel
- U.S. National Register of Historic Places
- U.S. Historic district – Contributing property
- New York State Register of Historic Places
- New York City Landmark
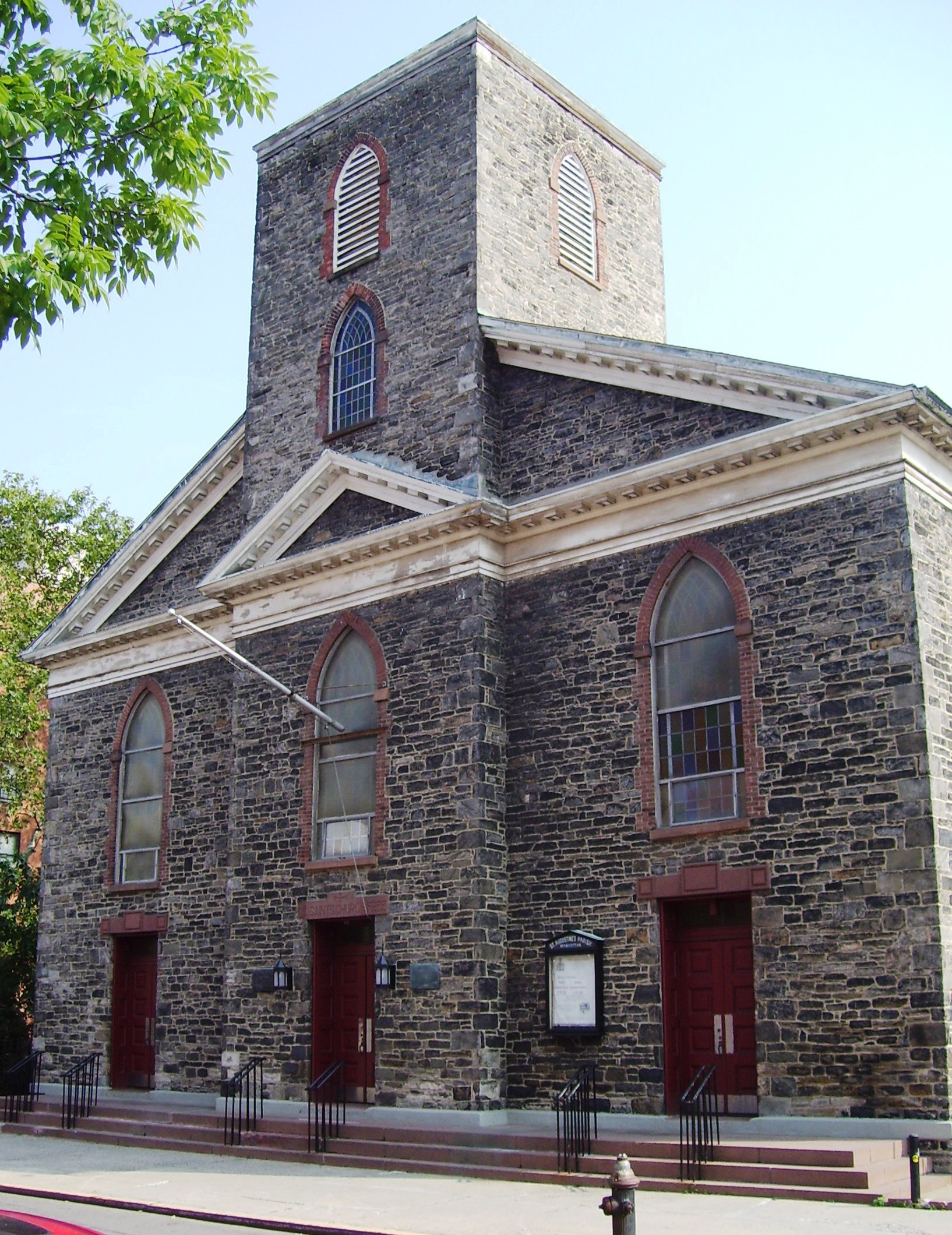
- (2011)

- Location within Lower Manhattan Location within Manhattan Location within New York City Location within New York Location within the United States
- Location: 290 Henry St. Manhattan, New York City
- Coordinates: 40°42′48″N 73°59′2″W
- Built: 1827–1829
- Architect: John Heath
- Architectural style: Georgian, Gothic Revival
- Part of: Lower East Side Historic District (ID04000297)
- NRHP reference No.: 80002718
- NYSRHP No.: 06101.000438
- NYCL No.: 0088

Significant dates
- Added to NRHP: May 6, 1980
- Designated NYSRHP: June 23, 1980
- Designated NYCL: August 16, 1966

St. Augustine's Church is located at 290 Henry Street between Montgomery and Jackson Streets on the Lower East Side of Manhattan, New York City. It was formed from the merger of All Saints' Free Church (founded 1819) and St. Augustine's Chapel. The current congregation occupies the All Saints' Free Church building, constructed in 1827–1829.

In 2021, it reported 46 members, average attendance of 22, and $62,280 in plate and pledge income.

== History ==
The church began in 1819 as a mission near the old Grand Street Ferry run by students of the General Theological Seminary. Led by former mayor, Marinus Willett, the mission grew. It was organized as a parish in 1824, and construction began on All Saints' Free Church ("Free" meaning free of pew rent), around 1827. It was built of Manhattan schist. Around this time "Mount Pitt" (also known as Jones Hill), near Pitt and Grand Streets, was being leveled, and some of field stone used was taken from there.

The design – a Georgian structure with Gothic windows – is credited to John Heath, and includes a double pediment and a projecting tower. The church was consecrated in 1828 by Bishop John Henry Hobart. Edgar Allan Poe used to attend on occasion during the church's early years.

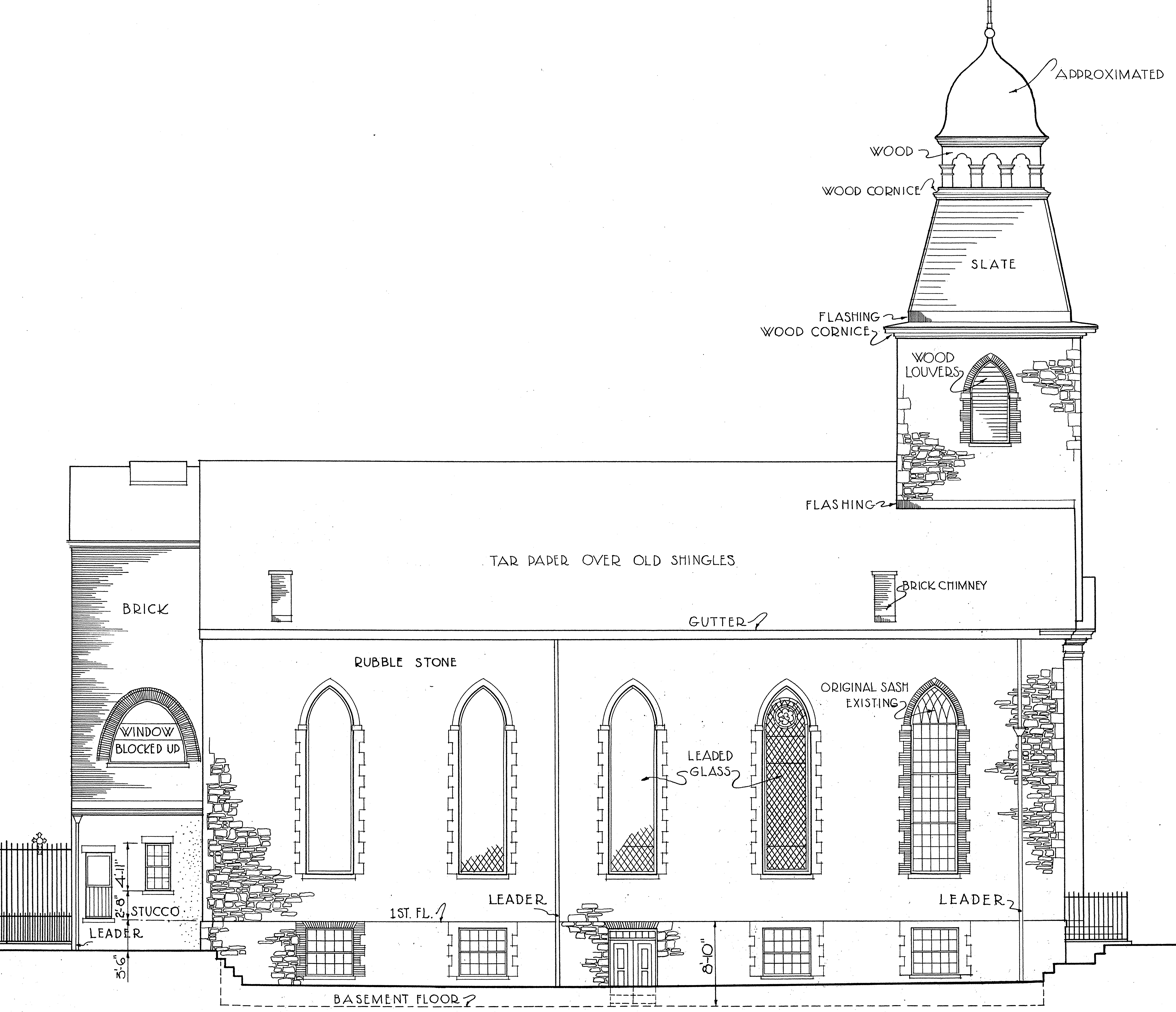
This 1934 drawing from the Historic American Buildings Survey shows approximately what the east elevation of the church looked like before it lost its tower.

Traditionally, it is thought that two rough galleries on either side of the organ loft might have been for the use of slaves, despite the church having been built after slaves were emancipated in New York. The building was enlarged in 1848 with the addition of a sanctuary and a chancel.

In 1949, the congregation merged with St. Augustine's Chapel of Trinity Church, then located at 107 East Houston Street, and the new combined congregation used the building on Henry Street. The parish became independent of Trinity in 1976.

The building became a New York City landmark in 1966, and was added to the National Register of Historic Places in 1980.

== See also ==
- List of New York City Designated Landmarks in Manhattan below 14th Street
- National Register of Historic Places listings in Manhattan below 14th Street
