= Bert Andrews (photographer) =

American photographer

- Born: Bert J. Andrews; March 21, 1929; Chicago, Illinois
- Died: January 25, 1993 (aged 63); New York City
- Known for: Photography

Bert Andrews (March 21, 1929 – January 25, 1993) was an American photographer, who chronicled black theatre in New York City. In a career that spanned over three decades he photographed many of the leading African American actors of the stage and screen including James Earl Jones, Cicely Tyson, Diana Sands, Louis Gossett Jr., Billy Dee Williams, Morgan Freeman, Alfre Woodard, Denzel Washington and Samuel L. Jackson.

== Biography ==
Bert J. Andrews was born in Chicago on March 21, 1929, the son of John and Frieda Andrews. At a young age, he moved to Harlem, where he grew up. His career began in the entertainment industry as a songwriter, singer and a dancer. In the early 1950s, while serving in the army, Andrews began studying photography.

In 1953, soon after his discharge from the army, Andrews began his work as an apprentice for Chuck Stewart, who was well known for his photography of jazz musicians. He served in that capacity until 1957, when he branched out on his own, photographing among other things, stills for black theatre productions in New York City.

One of his first assignments as a freelance photographer was the 1957 production of the play, Dark of the Moon, which was produced by the YMCA Drama Guild at the Little Theatre. This production was staged by Vinnette Carroll and featured among the cast Cicely Tyson, Roscoe Lee Browne and Clarence Williams III.

Throughout his long career, Andrews would photograph numerous productions of important plays including The Blacks (1961), The Blood Knot (1964), To Be Young, Gifted and Black (1969), The River Niger (1972), Bubbling Brown Sugar (1976), A Soldier's Play (1982) and Ma Rainey's Black Bottom (1984).

His photographs have also appeared in numerous major publications, such as Time, Life, Ebony, Newsweek and The New York Times.

On January 29, 1985, a fire destroyed his studio at 750 Eighth Avenue at the corner of 46th Street in New York City. Somewhere between 40,000 and 50,000 images were lost, spanning roughly thirty years of work. However, through the help of various theatre companies, Andrews was able to obtain prints of a significant number of his photographs including approximately 2,000 from the Negro Ensemble Company.

In 1988, the Bert Andrews Photographic Collection of Blacks in the Theatre was established at the Schomburg Center for Research in Black Culture. The following year, a collection of these photographs were published in the book In the Shadow of the Great White Way: Images from the Black Theatre (Thunder's Mouth Press, 1989).

Andrews died of cancer at the Lenox Hill Hospital in Manhattan on January 25, 1993, at the age of 63.
