= Henry Street (Manhattan) =

Street in Manhattan, New York

Coordinates: 40°42.8′N 73°59.4′W

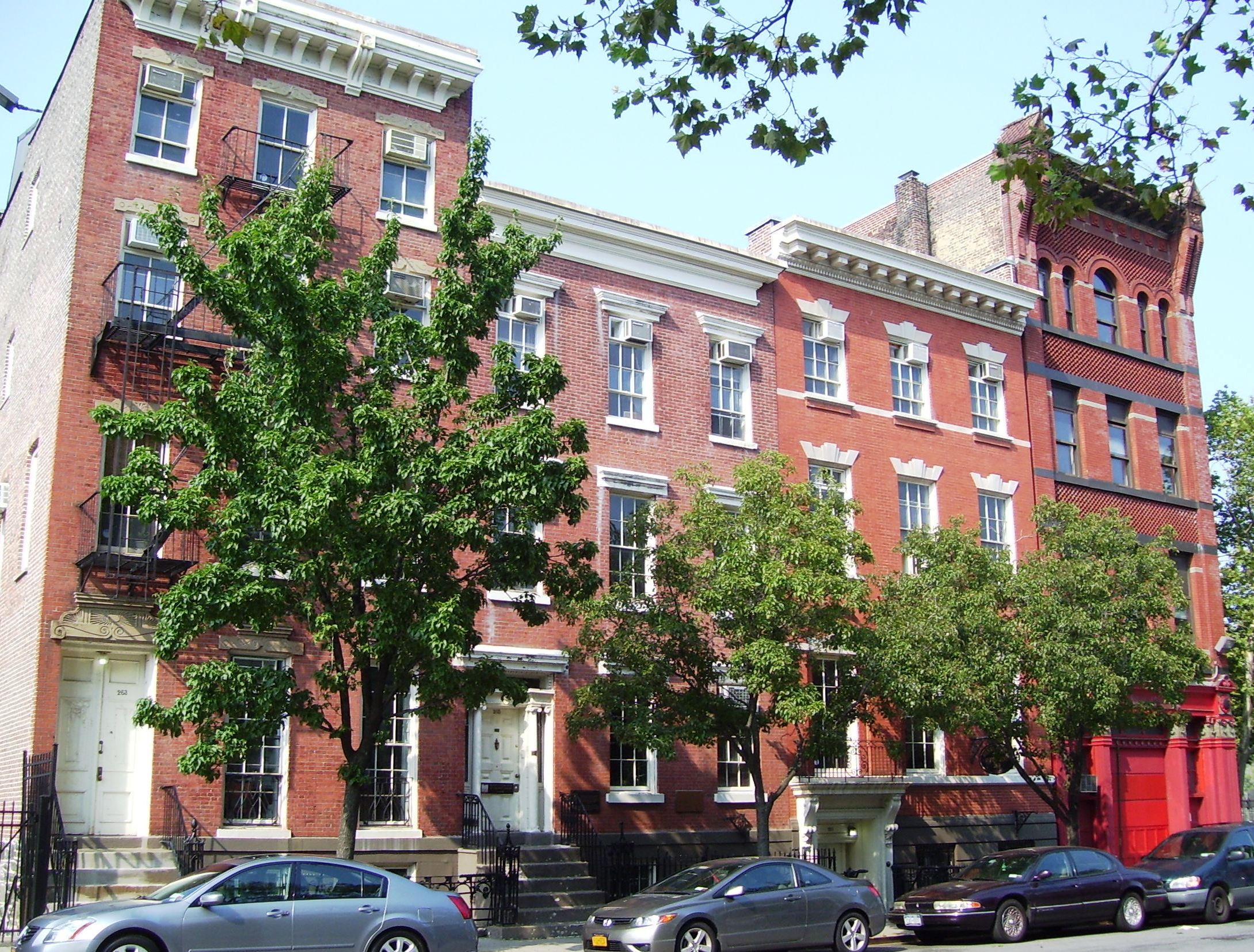
The Henry Street Settlement

Henry Street is a street on the Lower East Side of the New York City borough of Manhattan that runs one-way eastbound, except for two small two-way segments west of Pike Street and east of Montgomery Street. It spans from Oliver Street in the west (locally called "south" because it is towards downtown), passing underneath the Manhattan Bridge and on to Grand Street in the east ("north"). The street is named for Henry Rutgers, a hero of the American Revolutionary War, and prominent philanthropist. Rutgers Street, which intersects with Henry Street, is also named for him.

Thanks to Rutgers' generosity a church was constructed at Henry and Oliver Streets to serve sailors from the East River docks. The Mariners' Temple at 3 Henry Street was built in 1845, and continued to serve maritime workers and their families. It is a New York City designated landmark and was added to the National Register of Historic Places in 1980.

The poor condition of immigrants living in squalid tenements on Henry Street and the surrounding neighborhood in the late 19th century prompted nurses Lillian Wald and Mary Maud Brewster to found the Henry Street Settlement in 1893. In recent times, Henry Street continues to be an immigrant neighborhood and has been absorbed into an expanding Chinatown.

St. Augustine's Church at 290 Henry Street between Montgomery and Grand Streets was built in 1827–29 as the All Saints' Free Church, and was constructed out of Manhattan schist. The Georgian-Gothic design is credited to architect John Heath. It was designated a New York City landmark in 1966.

At the northwest corner of (16–18) Rutgers Street, Henry Street fronts The Roman Catholic Church of St. Theresa, built 1841 for the First Presbyterian Church of New York (PCUSA).

In recognition of Henry Street's multicultural history, the Henry Street School for International Studies opened in 2004 at 220 Henry Street. The Henry Street School lower school (grades 6–8) welcomes a diverse group of students from the Bronx, Manhattan, Brooklyn and Queens. The school is one of the New York City Department of Education's small schools and is supported by the Asia Society and the Bill and Melinda Gates Foundation.
