= Claudia McNeil =

American actress

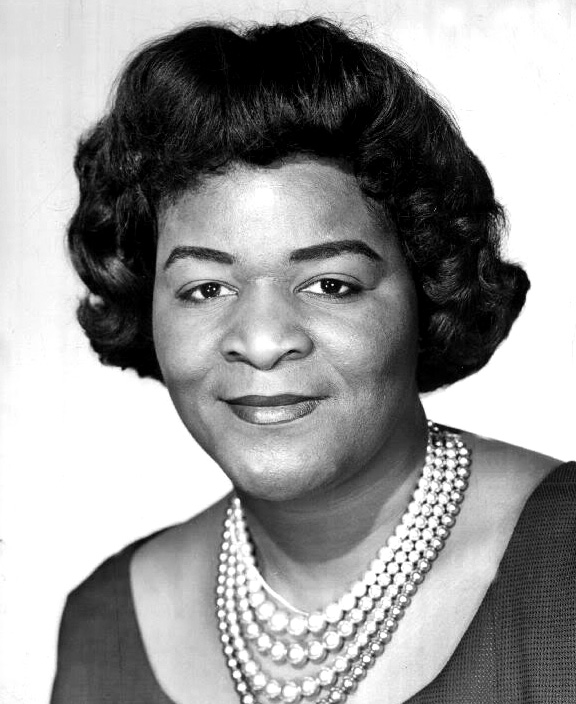
- publicity photo, 1960
- Born: August 13, 1917; Baltimore, Maryland, U.S.
- Died: November 25, 1993 (aged 76); Englewood, New Jersey, U.S.
- Occupation: Actress
- Years active: 1953–1983
- Spouse: Henry Smith (m. 1936; died 1945) Herman McCoy (m. 1962; div. 1964)
- Children: 2

Claudia Mae McNeil (August 13, 1917 – November 25, 1993) was an American actress known for premiering the role of matriarch Lena Younger in both the stage and screen productions of A Raisin in the Sun.

She later appeared in a 1981 production of the musical version of the play, Raisin presented by Equity Library Theater. She was twice nominated for a Tony Award, first for her onstage performance in A Raisin in the Sun (1959), and again for the play Tiger, Tiger Burning Bright in 1962. She was also nominated for a Golden Globe Award and a BAFTA Award for the screen version of A Raisin in the Sun in 1961.

== Life and career ==
McNeil was born in Baltimore, Maryland, to Marvin Spencer McNeil (1888 - ??), who was Black, and Annie Mae (Anderson) McNeil (1889 - 1937), an Apache woman. The family moved to New York City soon after her birth. She was raised by her mother after her father left the family. At the age of 12, McNeil began working for The Heckscher Foundation for Children. There she met a white Jewish couple who later adopted her, and McNeil became fluent in Yiddish.

She was advised by Ethel Waters to begin acting, and made her New York stage debut in 1953, understudying Jacqueline Andre in the role of Tituba in The Crucible at the Martin Beck Theater. She first went on in the role in mid-March 1953.

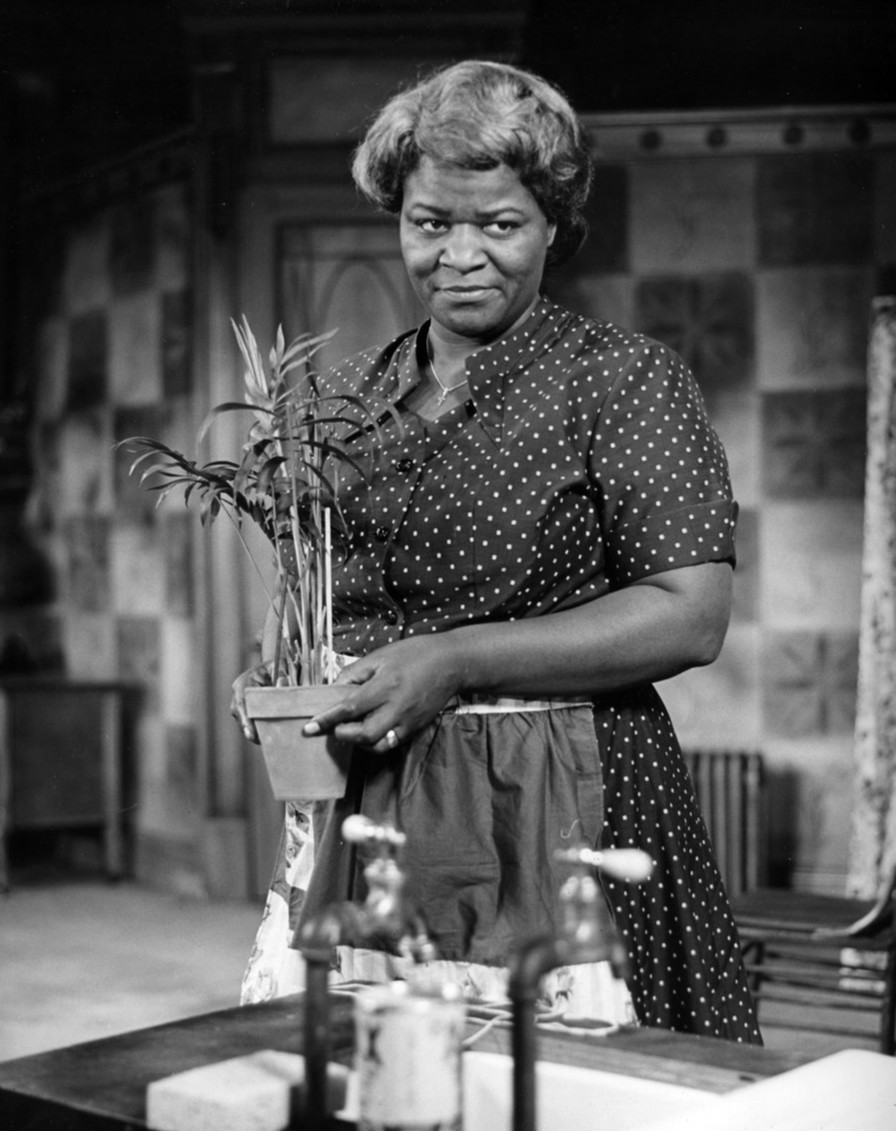
McNeil as Lena Younger in the 1959 play, A Raisin in the Sun.

In 1961, McNeil recreated her 1959 stage role in the film A Raisin in the Sun and became so identified with the part of the matriarch that she said, “There was a time when I acted the role.…Now I live it.” New York Times journalist Eric Pace summarized McNeil's performance explaining that she had a "commanding presence." Pace continued, "On the screen, Miss McNeil was stolid, voluminous and serene as a mother trying to control her son (played by Sidney Poitier) and wanting to buy her family a respectable home."

She acted in more films, including The Last Angry Man (1959), There Was a Crooked Man... (1970), and Black Girl (1972).

In 1980, she and Sam Levene starred in a summer stock and national tour of Henry Denker's comedy, Horowitz & Mrs. Washington.

McNeil appeared in many TV series, including The DuPont Show of the Month (1957), The Nurses (1962), Profiles in Courage (1965), and Roots: The Next Generations (1979).

== Personal life ==
Aged 19, McNeil married William Henry Smith who she described as a "very wonderful man". They had two sons. Her husband died in World War II. Both her sons were reportedly killed in the Korean War. Her second marriage (to Herman McCoy) ended in divorce in 1964 after two years.

She studied Judaism, the religion of her adoptive parents. Though she maintained a great respect for it, saying she carried a copy of both the Talmud and the Bible with her wherever she went, she converted to Catholicism in 1952 and was said to have been devout.

== Retirement and death ==
She retired in 1983 and two years later moved into the Actors’ Fund Nursing Home in Englewood, New Jersey. McNeil died there on November 25, 1993, aged 76, from complications related to diabetes.

== Selected filmography ==
=== Film ===
- The Last Angry Man (1959) - Mrs. Quincy
- A Raisin in the Sun (1961) - Lena Younger
- There Was a Crooked Man... (1970) - Madam
- Black Girl (1972) - Mu' Dear

=== Television ===
- The DuPont Show of the Month (1957) - Bernice Sadie Brown
- The Nurses (1963) - Mrs. Hill
- Profiles in Courage (1965) - Mrs. Haines
- Moon of the Wolf (1972) - Sara
- Cry Panic (1974) - Ethel Hanson
- Roots: The Next Generations (1979) - Sister Will Ada
- The Doctors (May 1980) - Mrs. Johnson
