= One Last Look =

- Written by: Steve Carter
- Original language: English
- Subject: Family members reflect on the death of a patriarch.
- Genre: Surreal Comedy
- Setting: 1960s; Funeral parlor in Harlem, New York

Premiere
- Date premiered: November 13, 1967
- Place premiered: Old Reliable Theatre Tavern; New York City

One Last Look is a 1967 play by American playwright Steve Carter. During a funeral service, mourners reflect on their relationship with the deceased.

== Original production ==
- Directed by Arthur French
- Produced by Norman "Speedy" Hartmann and Tony Preston

Opened: November 13, 1967 at the Old Reliable Theatre Tavern in New York City.

=== Cast ===
- A. D. Cannon - Eustace Baylor
- Louise Mike - Soprano
- Mari Foreman - Cora Lee
- Gracie Carroll - Adelaide
- Ensley - Funeral Director
- Bette Howard - Reva Butler
- Pawnee Sills - Donna Butler
- Carl Gordon - Charlie Butler
- Barbara Clarke - Annette Butler
- Denise Nicholas - April Baylor
- David Downing - Stace Baylor
- Jack Landron - The Attendant

== Notes ==
Introduces the character of Eustace Baylor, who later appears in Carter's award-winning play, Eden. The nonspeaking role of the attendant was added by the director, Arthur French. Carter credits French for "putting meaning to the play" and putting him "on the map" as a playwright.
