= Charles Brown (actor) =

American actor (1946–2004)

- Born: January 15, 1946; Talladega, Alabama, U.S.
- Died: January 8, 2004 (aged 57); Cleveland, Ohio, U.S.
- Occupation: Actor

Charles Brown (January 15, 1946 – January 8, 2004) was an American actor and a member of New York City, New York, theater troupe the Negro Ensemble Company. He was best known for his performances in Off-Broadway and Broadway plays by Samm-Art Williams and August Wilson.

== Biography ==
Charles Brown was born in Talladega, Alabama, and raised in Cleveland, Ohio, the son of Mack Brown Sr. His siblings included brothers Mack Jr. and Ramon and sister Shirley. After serving in the U.S. Navy during the Vietnam War, Brown studied theater at Howard University, in Washington, D.C. He performed with that city's D.C. Black Repertory Company, and elsewhere.

Brown became a regular member of the Negro Ensemble Company, where his roles included Southern farmer Cephus Miles in Samm-Art Williams' Home (1979) and military investigator Captain Richard Davenport in 1944 Louisiana in Charles Fuller's A Soldier's Story (1981). Home moved to Broadway in 1980, earning Brown a Tony Award nomination for Best Actor in a Play. In 2001 he received his second, for Best Featured Actor in a Play, for his role as the gambler and con man Elmore in August Wilson's King Hedley II. That part won him a 2001 Drama Desk Award.

Other stage work includes roles in Neil Simon's Rumors (1988); John Guare's A Few Stout Individuals (2002); Jessica Blank and Erik Jensen's The Exonerated; Don Evans' Showdown; Leslie Lee's First Breeze of Summer (1975); Richard Wesley's The Mighty Gents (1978); Steve Carter's Nevis Mountain Dew; and Wilson's Fences (1987), in which he portrayed the older son of a character played by James Earl Jones. Television credits included the New York City-shot series Kojak, The Cosby Show, Law & Order, Law & Order: Special Victims Unit, and The Equalizer. In the 1983 TV series Kennedy, he portrayed the civil rights leader Martin Luther King Jr.

Brown was married to Renee Lescook. He died of prostate cancer in Cleveland, Ohio, where he lived.

== Filmography ==
Charles Brown film and television credits
Year	Title	Role	Notes
1976	Kojak	Dan Garrett	1 episode
1980	Headin' for Broadway	Pimp	Film
1983	Without a Trace	Sachs	Film
1983	Trading Places	Officer Reynolds	Film
1985	The Equalizer	Sgt. Oliver Gant	Episode: "Bump and Run"
1986	Legal Eagles	Real Cavanaugh	Film
1989	The Cosby Show	Capt. Turvey	1 episode
1993	Law & Order	Riggs	Episode: "Animal Instinct"
1994	Drop Squad	Uncle Otha	Film
1999	Law & Order: Special Victims Unit	Mr. Krim	Episode: "Stalked"
2001	Law & Order	Stephen Morehouse	Episode: "Armed Forces"
