= Graham Brown (actor) =

American actor

- Born: Robert E. Brown; October 24, 1924; New York, New York, U.S.
- Died: December 13, 2011 (aged 87); Englewood, New Jersey, U.S.
- Occupation: Actor
- Years active: 1963–1995

Graham Brown (October 24, 1924 – December 13, 2011) was an American actor known for his work in theatre.

== Life and career ==
He was born Robert E. Brown in New York, New York, and was a one-time boxer. He attended Howard University, where he earned a BA in theater. He also studied method acting at the Actors Studio in New York. He began his career as a Shakespearean actor at Guthrie Theater, where he appeared in productions such as Hamlet and Richard III. Brown was an original member of Negro Ensemble Company (NEC) and played in many NEC productions, including Malcochon by Derek Walcott, Ceremonies in Dark Old Men by Lonne Elder III, and District Line and The River Niger by Joseph A Walker. He was part of the original cast of controversial play Song of the Lusitanian Bogey by Peter Weiss, which toured Europe and was subject to a riot in a London theatre in August 1968. Graham Brown was often cast as professional and/or highly educated people such as doctors and clergymen.

One of his best remembered roles was as Jared Philibert, the 50-year-old patriarch of a Caribbean-American family in Steve Carter's critically acclaimed play Nevis Mountain Dew. He originated the role in NEC's Off-Broadway production and reprised the role in the West Coast premiere of the play. For the latter he received a Los Angeles Drama Critics Circle Award for his performance.

Brown died on December 13, 2011, of pulmonary failure at the Lillian Booth Actors' Fund Nursing Home.

== Selected credits ==
=== Theatre ===
Year	Production	Role	Theatre(s)	Notes
1963	Hamlet	Horatio	Minnesota Theater Company	
1968	Weekend	Dr. Hampton	Broadhurst Theatre	
1968	The Man in the Glass Booth	Sam	Royale Theatre	
1971	Behold! Cometh the Vanderkellans	Dr. Vanderkellans	Theatre de Lys	
1972	The River Niger	Dr. Dudley Stanton	St. Mark's Playhouse; Brooks Atkinson Theatre	Originally an Off-Broadway production that was transferred to Broadway.
1975	Black Picture Show	Norman	Vivian Beaumont Theater	
1976	Eden	Joseph Barton	St. Mark's Playhouse; Theatre de Lys	Transferred to Theatre de Lys on May 14, 1976.
1976	Kings	Tiresias in "Oedipus"	Alvin Theatre	
1978	Nevis Mountain Dew	Jared Philibert	St. Mark's Playhouse	
1980	Lagrima del Diablo	Archbishop Stephen Emmanuel Pontiflax	St. Mark's Playhouse	
1981	Nevis Mountain Dew	Jared Philibert	Los Angeles Actors Theatre	Los Angeles Drama Critics Circle Award, Lead Performance
1985	Ceremonies in Dark Old Men	William Jenkins	Theatre Four	
1989	The Talented Tenth	Father/ Sam Griggs	Manhattan Theatre Club Stage I	

=== Film ===
Year	Title	Role	Notes
1984	The Muppets Take Manhattan	Mr. Wrightson	
1989	Bloodhounds of Broadway	Dr. Frischer	
1992	Malcolm X	Dr. Payson	
1994	Blues in C	Bucky Webb	Short
1995	Clockers	Mr. Herman Brown	

=== Television ===
Year	Title	Role	Notes
1968	N.Y.P.D		Episode: "Deadly Circle of Violence"
1970	Days of Our Lives	Jeffrey Jones	
1972	Ironside	Tom	Episode: "The Countdown"
1974	Sanford and Son	Principal	Episode: "Julio and Sister and Nephew"
1978	Police Story	Eustic McCoy	Episode: "Day of Terror...Night of Fear"
1982	Lou Grant	Price McCann	Episode: "Blacklist"
1982	Cagney and Lacey	Dr. Norell	Episode: "Suffer the Children"
1983	One Life Left to Live	Gaston Dupree	Episode: "1.3814"
1985	All My Children	Professor Lakeland	Episode: "1.3895"
1990-1993	Law and Order	Appellate Judge Barry Marshall / Appellate Judge Barry Marton / Minister	3 episodes
