= Dame Lorraine (play) =

- Original language: English
- Written by: steve carter
- Series: The Caribbean Trilogy: Eden; Nevis Mountain Dew Dame Lorraine
- Subject: An elderly Caribbean couple anxiously await the return of their son from prison
- Genre: Drama
- Setting: 1980s; Modestly furnished apartment in Harlem, New York

Premiere
- Date: March 27, 1981
- Place: Victory Gardens Theatre; Chicago, Illinois

Dame Lorraine is a 1981 play by American playwright Steve Carter. Set in the 1980s, it is the third of Carter's Caribbean trilogy. Dame Lorraine explores a family who has lost all of their sons, except one. The last son is returning from a long sentence in prison.

== Original production ==
- Directed by Chuck Smith
- Produced by Victory Gardens Theatre
- Set Designer: Thomas Beall
- Costumes: Kate Bergh
- Lighting: John Rodriguez

Opened: March 27, 1981 at Victory Gardens Theatre in Chicago.

=== Cast ===
- Jackie Taylor as Rene Moulineaux
- Linda Bright as Angela Moulineaux
- Vince Viverito as Salvatore Buongusto
- Esther Rolle as Dorcas Moulineaux
- Don Xerique Williams as Picton Moulineaux

== Los Angeles production (West Coast premiere) ==
- Directed by Edmund Cambridge
- Produced by Los Angeles Actors Theatre
- Opened: January 1983 at Los Angeles Actors Theatre

=== Cast ===
- Denise Nicholas as Angela Moulineaux
- Thom Christopher as Salvatore Buongusto
- Esther Rolle as Dorcas Moulineaux
- Davis Roberts as Picton Moulineaux
