= Doris Derby =

American photographer (1939–2022)

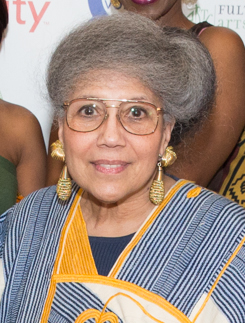
- Derby in 2014
- Born: November 11, 1939; The Bronx, New York City, U.S.
- Died: March 28, 2022 (aged 82); Atlanta, Georgia, U.S.
- Occupations: Activist, photographer, educator
- Known for: Civil rights photography
- Spouse: Robert A. Banks (m. 1995)

Doris Adelaide Derby (November 11, 1939 – March 28, 2022) was an American activist and documentary photographer. She was the adjunct associate professor of anthropology at Georgia State University and the founding director of their Office of African-American Student Services and Programs. She was active in the Mississippi civil rights movement, and her work discusses the themes of race and African-American identity. She was a working member of the Student Nonviolent Coordinating Committee (SNCC) and co-founder of the Free Southern Theater. Her photography has been exhibited internationally. Two of her photographs were published in Hands on the Freedom Plow: Personal Accounts by Women in SNCC, to which she also contributed an essay about her experiences in the Mississippi civil rights movement.

== Early life ==
Doris Derby's parents met in New York and married in the mid-1930s. Born on November 11, 1939, Derby was raised in Williamsbridge, the outskirts of the Bronx. During her time in a predominantly white elementary school, she started to notice a lack of black representation in her textbooks, movies, advertisements, and in the arts. For this reason, in her early age, she was motivated to make a change. In this she was encouraged by her parents, Hubert Derby, an engineer and later civil servant who had to change jobs several times because of discrimination, and Lucille (nee Johnson). Her grandmother, Edith Delaney Johnson, had started a chapter of the NAACP in Maine in the 1920s.

She began to formally study dance while in elementary school and gravitated towards African-centered dance traditions. Derby received a scholarship to study at the Katherine Dunham African dance classes at the Harlem YMCA.

Derby's association with the civil rights movement began when she joined the NAACP Youth Chapter in her hometown of New York City at her church at the age of 16. She continued her association with the Student Nonviolent Coordinating Committee (SNCC) while attending Hunter College in New York. At the college, she was a member of the Christian Human Relations Group where they discussed topics such as segregation, sit-ins, and the Freedom Riders. As a student activist, she was on the front lines of the civil rights movement. Derby worked primarily with SNCC in New York, Albany, Georgia, and throughout the state of Mississippi.

== Civil rights and cultural activism in Mississippi ==
Derby was approaching her last year in college in 1960 when she visited countries such as Nigeria, France, and Italy. During her time she began appreciating the differences in cultures and learning about the struggles the countries were facing. She visited the Navajo Indian Reservation where she saw the economic inequalities the population was experiencing.

In 1963, before the March on Washington, Derby, an elementary school teacher at the time, was recruited to work in an adult literacy program initiated by the SNCC at Tougaloo College located in Mississippi. During this time, Derby recalled rooming with Sandra "Casey" Hayden and Hellen Jean O'Neal-McCray who contributed in developing literacy materials to help prepare black people to pass the required, yet discriminatory literacy test for voter eligibility in Mississippi. As a SNCC organizer in Jackson, Mississippi, Derby felt compelled to work in the South as she saw a need for change through her life experiences.

Her experience moving to the South as a native northerner sparked and ignited her. A war on the home front had been started. For this reason, people from all walks of life, backgrounds and ethnic groups were called to work together for a greater cause. Many individuals participated and were committed to the movement, however, black people were most impacted by the injustice of the South and took this time to really take a stance.

Derby made many contributions during her time at Tougaloo College with John O'Neal, another SNCC worker on the literacy project as well as Gilbert Moses, a journalist for the Jackson Free Press. Most notably, she co-founded the Free Southern Theater, Derby felt that a repertory theater company could travel throughout the state and incorporate all of the arts through the development of a cultural format. Creating a space for interaction with the people in the movement and the grassroots community who had suffered the most. The theater would be a vehicle that could be used to inform and perhaps reveal new creative strategies to deal with the institution of segregation. "We needed to look into ourselves in order to empower ourselves and reclaim the freedom we did not have in Mississippi and other southern states."

Derby saw a need for the creation of a cultural artistic tool that could be used to involve, inspire, enlighten, and galvanize black people to critically think and create for themselves. The theater provided the opportunity for black people to creatively take on issues within the context of the civil rights movement, segregation and closed society of violent Mississippi. Furthermore, it sparked social change, social justice, equal opportunity and citizenship regardless of race.

From 1963 to 1972 Derby served as a SNCC field secretary in various capacities in Jackson, Mississippi, in the Council of Federated Organizations, the Mississippi Freedom Democratic Party, the Poor Peoples' Corporation, and the Child Development Group of Mississippi Head start Program. During this period she worked on preparations for the Freedom Summer, taught in various educational enrichment programs, and promoted local arts and culture. She also helped incorporate Liberty House Cooperative Marketing, an arm of the Poor Peoples' Corporation. Derby was also involved in the marketing, public relations, and training of these groups.

In 1967 she joined Southern Media, Inc., a documentary, photography, an filmmaking group in Jackson, Mississippi, that traveled throughout the state documenting the lives, struggles, initiatives and gains of people in and around the movement. She lectured and exhibited at Jackson State College on African art and culture.

Her many "trials and tribulations" in the SNCC and FST in Mississippi are reflected in her independently published book Poetagraphy: Artistic Reflections of a Mississippi Lifeline in Words and Images: 1963–1972 (2019).

== Further education and achievements ==
Derby left Mississippi in 1972 and focused on African and African-American studies, for which she earned an M.A., as well as a Ph.D. in social anthropology from the University of Illinois Urbana–Champaign. In 1990, she joined the University System of Georgia at Georgia State University as an adjunct associate professor of anthropology and the founding director of the Office of African-American Student Services and Programs. Her department's achievements included the retention and graduation of a vast number of African-American students, as well as the enhancement of cultural and educational ties between African, Caribbean, Latin and African-American students and the community at large. She also co-founded the Performing and Visual Arts Council at Georgia State University in 2008. At the end of 2012, Derby retired from Georgia State University after 22 years of service. Derby also taught at the College of Charleston, the University of Illinois, and the University of Wisconsin.

== Photography ==
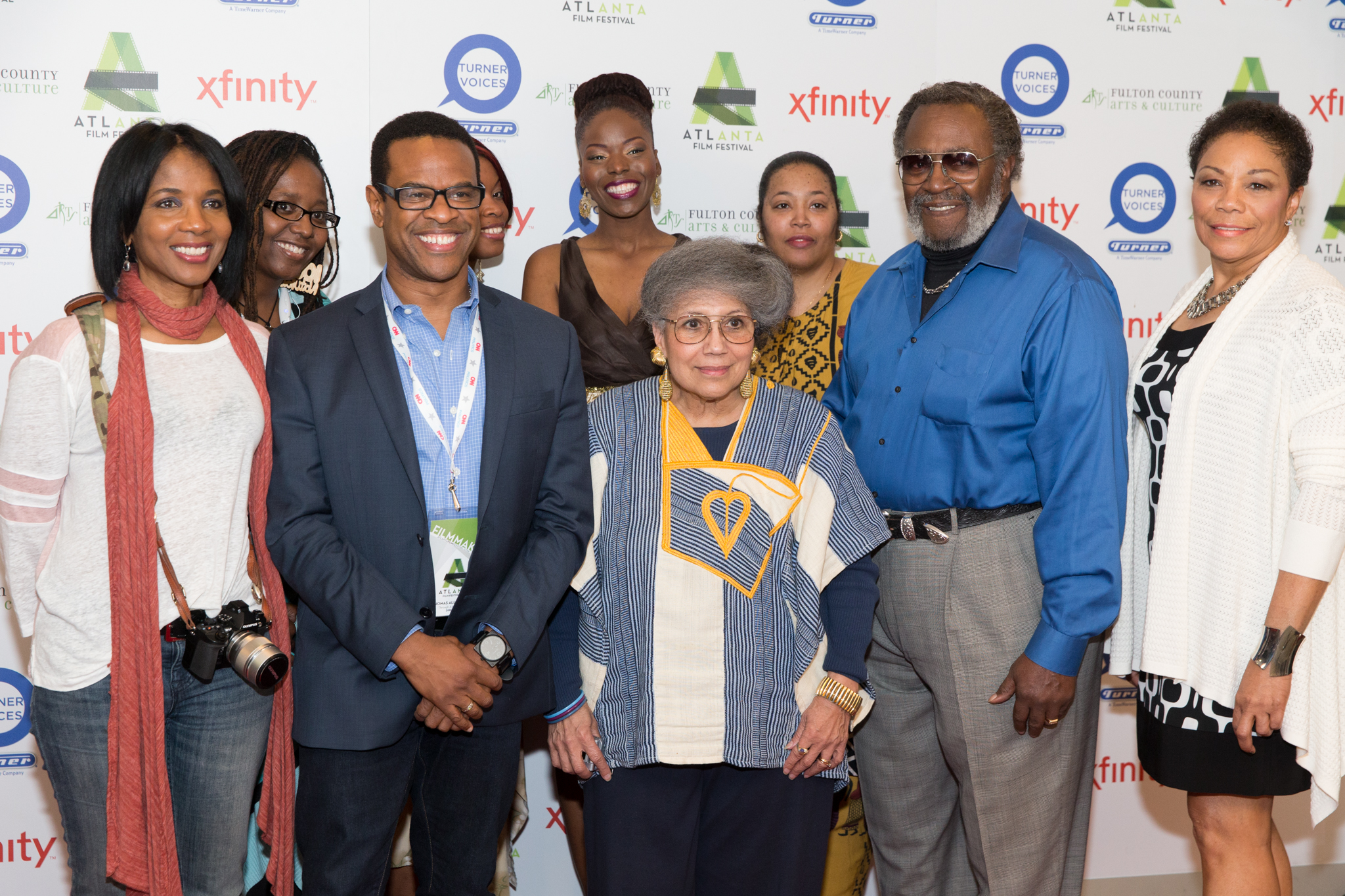
Derby (center) at the Through a Lens Darkly premiere at the 2014 Atlanta Film Festival

Derby's father taught her to use a camera. After her arrival in Mississippi in 1963, she began to document the everyday human effort required to live through dramatic events and protests of the civil rights struggle. "Documenting was one of the things I was destined to do from an early age", she later explained. "I knew that we did not have our history in history books and I knew we had a lot of achievements. I wanted to make sure that I recorded whatever i could, whatever was historical and happening around me".

Derby exhibited her photographs both locally and nationally. Her photographs have been shown at the Smithsonian Institution, the Field Museum of Natural History in Chicago, Illinois, the Bronx Museum of the Arts in New York, and the Skirball Cultural Center in Los Angeles, California. Derby's photographs have also been exhibited in Atlanta, Georgia, at the High Museum, the Hammonds House Museum, Spelman College, the Fulton County Southwest Arts Center, and the Auburn Avenue Research Library. As well, her photographs have been exhibited at the Art, Design and Architecture Museum, UC Santa Barbara, the Jackson State University and Margaret Walker Alexander Center Art Galleries and the George & Leah McKenna Museum of African American Art in New Orleans. Other exhibits displayed in Atlanta were at Georgia State University, in the Gallery Lounge and The Ernest G. Welch Gallery. In 2009, her work was part of an exhibit, "Road to Freedom", at the High Museum in Atlanta, which explored the role of photography in the civil rights movement.

Derby's work can be found in the following: Polly Greenberg's The Devil Has Slippery Shoes, 1990; Clarissa Myrick-Harris's Women in the Civil Rights Movement: Trailblazers and Torchbearer, 1941-1965, 1993; Deborah Willis' Reflections in Black - A History of Black Photographers, 2000; The Nation's Longest Struggle - Looking Back on the Modern Civil Rights Movement, D.C. Everest Oral History Project, 2013. Her many "trials and tribulations" in the literacy and theater projects are reflected in her self-published book Poetagraphy: Artistic Reflections of a Mississippi Lifeline in Words and Images: 1963 - 1972.

In 2020, Derby's work was included in an exhibition of civil rights art at the Turner Contemporary in London. We Will Walk: Art and Resistance in the American South included sculptural assemblages, paintings and quilts by more than 20 African American artists from Alabama and surrounding states. In 2021, a collection of her images from the south, with transcripts of conversations with her collaborator Hannah Collins, was published as A Civil Rights Journey.

Derby's work was included in the 2025 exhibition Photography and the Black Arts Movement, 1955–1985 at the National Gallery of Art.

== Personal life ==
Derby lived in Atlanta, Georgia, with her husband, actor Bob Banks, whom she married in 1995. She adopted his children, Daniel and Lisa. The three survived her, along with two grandchildren, Dr. Ashley Gilmore, Ms. Alexis Carr, two great-grandchildren, and her sister Pauline.

They were active leaders in their community and members of local and national organizations. She died on March 28, 2022, in Atlanta from cancer at the age of 82.

== Acknowledgements ==
For the 50th anniversary of the 1963 March on Washington for Jobs and Freedom, Derby was interviewed for a prospective documentary film about past and current March on Washington participants, along with 16 others who participated, for Time magazine's five-part documentary "March Special - One Man, One March, One Dream". She was also interviewed on WSB-TV, Channel 2 Atlanta, for a segment shown on the anniversary, as well as a commemorative special program that was aired the day before. In addition, Derby was featured in a documentary film about past and current March on Washington participants. This film was sponsored by the National Center for Civil and Human Rights, with the interview being conducted by Atlanta-based film interns. In April 2010, Derby and other SNCC members gathered to celebrate the 50th Anniversary of SNCC. Derby is one of the 52 contributors to the book Hands on the Freedom Plow - Personal Accounts of 52 Women in SNCC. On October 6, 2011, Derby received the 26th Governor's Award in the Humanities in Atlanta for documenting and preserving images and stories enabling current and future generations to learn about the civil rights movement and social change in the Deep South.
