= Horacena J. Taylor =

American director and stage manager (born 1940)

- Born: November 21, 1940 (age 85); Columbia, South Carolina
- Occupations: Theatre director, stage manager
- Years active: 1970s–1980s

Horacena J. Taylor (born November 21, 1940) is an American director and stage manager. She is best known for staging the original off-Broadway production of Steve Carter's critically acclaimed play Nevis Mountain Dew.

== Biography ==
Taylor was born in Columbia, South Carolina and is a graduate of Hampton Institute. She also attended Howard University where she was a business manager for the Howard Players. Relocating to New York City, she gained the reputation as "one of best stage managers in New York."

Starting in the early 1970s, Taylor has worked extensively as a stage manager on numerous productions for the Negro Ensemble Company (NEC) including The Sty of the Blind Pig, The First Breeze of Summer and The Brownsville Raid.

In 1978, she made her off-Broadway debut as a director with the play Nevis Mountain Dew by Steve Carter. The critically acclaimed production was selected by the Burns Mantle Yearbook as one of the ten best plays of the 1978–1979 season. For her work as a director, Taylor received a Drama Desk Award nomination.

== Selected Credits ==
=== Theatre ===
Year	Production	Theatre(s)	Notes
1982	Home	Arena Stage	
1982	Colored People's Time	Cherry Lane Theatre	Did not play at Theatre Four due to the extended run of Charles Fuller's A Soldier's Play
1980	The Sixteenth Round	Theatre Four	
1980	Big City Blues	St. Mark's Playhouse	
1979	Nevis Mountain Dew	Arena Stage	
1979	Old Phantoms	St. Mark's Playhouse	
1978	Nevis Mountain Dew	St. Mark's Playhouse	Drama Desk Award nomination, Outstanding Director of a Play

== Awards and nominations ==
- 1979 Drama Desk Award nomination, Outstanding Director of a Play for Nevis Mountain Dew
