= Free Southern Theater =

Former community theater group at Tougaloo College, MS, US

The Free Southern Theater (FST) was a community theater group founded in 1963 at Tougaloo College in Madison County, Mississippi, by Gilbert Moses, Denise Nicholas, Doris Derby, and John O'Neal. The company manager was Mary Lovelace, later Chair of the Art Department at U.C. Berkeley. The company disbanded in 1980.

The Free Southern Theater was a part of the emerging Black Theatre Movement and also closely allied with the civil rights movement—O'Neal and Derby were also directors of the Student Nonviolent Coordinating Committee (SNCC). They presented plays by Langston Hughes, John O. Killens, James Baldwin, and Ossie Davis as well as providing a space for their members to write their own plays.

The founders sought to introduce free theater to the South, both as a voice for social protest, and to emphasize positive aspects of African-American culture. O'Neal, Derby, and Moses outlined the philosophy of the troupe in a founding document:

Our fundamental objective is to stimulate creative and reflective thought among Negroes in Mississippi and other Southern states by the establishment of a legitimate theater, thereby providing the opportunity in the theater and the associated art forms. We theorize that within the Southern situation a theatrical form and style can be developed that is as unique to the Negro people as the origin of blues and jazz. A combination of art and social awareness can evolve into plays written for a Negro audience, which relate to the problems within the Negro himself, and within the Negro community.

== Mission ==
In 1963, John O'Neal, Doris Derby, Gilbert Moses, and William Hutchinson drafted "A General Prospectus for the Establishment of a Free Southern Theater, Jackson, Mississippi." This document outlined the goals of the theater company and how they would accomplish them. They included:

1. To acquaint Southern peoples with a breadth of experience with the theater and related art forms
2. To liberate and to explore the creative talent and potential that is here as well as to promote the production of art
3. To develop an appreciation of the theater and related art forms- an understanding of the technical problems as well as ideas and concepts
4. To bring in artists from outside the state as well as to provide the opportunity for local people with creative ability to have experience with the theater
5. To emphasize the universality of the problems of the Negro people
6. To strengthen communication between Southern Negroes
7. To assert that self-knowledge and creativity are the foundations of Human Dignity

With these goals in mind, they solidified a mission statement: "Our objective is to stimulate creative and reflective thought among Negroes in Mississippi and other Southern states by the establishment of a legitimate theater, thereby providing the opportunity for involvement in the theater and associated art forms."

== History ==
The Free Southern Theater was formed in September 1963 when Gilbert Moses and John O'Neal met in Mississippi while working with the civil rights movement. Their first production, In White America, toured 16 towns and cities ranging in size from Mileston in Holmes County, Mississippi, to New Orleans. Gilbert Moses recalls: "The Holmes County people came in from the farms to see us. We had to play in the afternoon because they wanted to get back home by dark." For professional help in theater management the Free Southern Theater began working with professor Richard Schechner, then at Tulane University, who joined the theatre as one of its producing directors. They toured rural Louisiana and Mississippi presenting plays such as Samuel Beckett’s Waiting for Godot. Initially consisting of both black and white actors, the company gradually became exclusively African-American and presented only plays by black playwrights such as the controversial LeRoi Jones (later known as Amiri Baraka).

From the first, the company was plagued by artistic and managerial disagreements; and, with free admission as a primary objective, money was always in short supply. Following their January 1965 tour, the company did fundraising performances in New York. Under financial duress and hoping to draw on a larger middle class black population, the troupe moved to New Orleans in 1965 where they purchased an office space and gathered a board of directors. The company went from eight members to twenty-three. In 1966 Moses, Schechner, and O'Neal left, and the company was taken over by African-American poet and writer Thomas Dent assisted by Val Ferdinand (later known as Kalamu ya Salaam).

The company launched workshops for actors and introduced plays written by their own members. Charles Kerbs produced at least one of these workshops. They adapted the play In White America by Martin Duberman to depict the murders of Congress of Racial Equality (CORE) field workers James Chaney, Michael Schwerner, and Andrew Goodman, killed in Philadelphia, Mississippi, by the Ku Klux Klan. They also performed Waiting for Godot in whiteface. and Ossie Davis's "Purlie Victorious".

But in spite of grants from the Rockefeller and Ford Foundations, and support from celebrities including Harry Belafonte, Arthur Ashe, Bill Cosby, and Julian Bond, The Free Southern Theater gradually lost its creative momentum and financial support. In 1980, The Free Southern Theater closed, however the 1985 production A Funeral for the Free Southern Theater: A Valediction Without Mourning, honored the company "featuring a jazz funeral and a three-day conference of art for social change". John O'Neal's theater company Junebug Productions strives to carry on the legacy of the Free Southern Theater.

In addition to John O'Neal and Gilbert Moses, well known actors who appeared in FST productions included Roscoe Orman, and Denise Nicholas.

== Founding members ==
=== Gilbert Moses ===
Gilbert Moses, a founding member of The Free Southern Theater and noted theater director, was born in Cleveland in August 1942. As a student at Oberlin College, Moses studied for a year at the Sorbonne in Paris before leaving school to join the civil rights movement. During his time in Mississippi, Moses served as a journalist for the Mississippi Free Press. New York Times theater critic Mel Gussow observes that an interest in the work of Jean Vilar and the Theatre National Populaire led Moses to pursue more "socially relevant theater". Following his involvement with The Free Southern Theater, Moses directed stage productions both on and off-Broadway. In 1969 Moses won an Obie Award for Amiri Baraka's 1969 play Slave Ship. Reflecting on a 1972 New York Times interview with Moses, Gussow observes how he "called for a deeper investigation of the lives of black people in the United States". He quotes Moses, "We as blacks are starved for images of ourselves all over this country". Moses died of multiple myeloma in April 1995.

=== Doris Derby ===
Born in either 1939 or 1940 in the Bronx, New York, Doris Derby’s long career has spread across a wide array of disciplines, ranging from theater to education. From an early age, Derby expressed strong interest in community activism and civil rights and joined a National Association for the Advancement of Colored People (NAACP) youth group in the Bronx. As a student at Hunter College in New York, Derby was a member of the Student Nonviolent Coordinating Committee (SNCC). The department of African American studies at Mississippi State University observes that the SNCC "organized voter registration drives, self help economic and educational initiatives and carried out protests at such places as segregated local, statewide and national governmental facilities, public movie theaters, parks, medical facilities and churches". Derby's work within the SNCC was centered, primarily, in New York, Georgia, and Mississippi. In Mississippi Derby taught adult literacy through the SNCC and helped found The Free Southern Theater. In 1990, Derby joined the faculty of Georgia State University and served as the founding Director of the Office of African American Student Services and Programs, as well as, Adjunct Associate Professor of Cultural Anthropology. A noted photographer, as well, Derby's work has been exhibited at the Smithsonian Institution and the Bronx Museum of Art. Her documentary photographs are known to "depict the life of struggling Americans who defied the post-emancipation status quo brought about by political, economic, social and cultural domination and exploitation". In 2012, Derby retired from Georgia State University following a successful 22 years of service.

=== John O'Neal ===
Like fellow FST founder, Doris Derby, John O'Neal worked for the Student Nonviolent Coordinating Committee (SNCC) in Mississippi as a field director. O'Neal also served as national field program director of the Committee for Racial Justice. The recipient of the Award of Merit from the Association of Performing Arts Presenters and a Ford Foundation Award, O'Neal wrote nineteen plays, a musical comedy, poetry, and several essays. In 1980, The Free Southern Theater produced their final performance, a solo piece written and performed by O'Neal titled Don't Start Me to Talking or I’ll Tell Everything I Know. The play features the character Junebug Jabbo Jones, "created by the SNCC members to represent and symbolize the wit and wisdom of common folk". This performance marked the final production of the FST, but also signified the creation of O'Neal's new theater company, Junebug Productions. John O'Neal served as the Founding Director and Artistic Director Emeritus for Junebug Productions until 2019. O'Neal died of vascular disease on February 14, 2019, at age 78.

== Notable productions ==
The first productions put on by the Free Southern Theatre were In White America and Waiting for Godot. These productions toured through the poor areas of the south, especially in Mississippi, where the company was founded. As part of their mission, the shows never charged an entry fee and performed in public places like churches and community halls. As mentioned in the History section, their production of Waiting for Godot was performed in whiteface since most of the cast was African American at the time. The theater also performed Purlie Victorious. In a New York Times article, a company member only referred to as "James" (James Cromwell, who played Pozzo) describes the enthusiasm that Godot received from the audiences in Mississippi.

== Outreach ==
In addition to free performances throughout its existence, the Free Southern Theatre remained rooted in its Civil Rights roots. They had workshops for the community and college students at various stops on their tours, an acting apprenticeship, and a sponsorship program for local artists in Mississippi. Their partnership with the SNCC was essential for them to gain funding and support in order to continue their mission.

The Free Southern Theater had to end its operations in 1980. Their mission did not entirely end, however, as Junebug Productions was formed in the shadow of the Free Southern Theater. This company is still working in several communities in the south in order to bring arts to areas that need it most. Their biggest project is the National Color Line Project in which the company travels and collects stories surrounding the Civil Rights Movement and uses them to archive history as well as bring new light to the current racial situation in the USA.
