= Marvin & Tige =

1983 American drama film

Marvin & Tige (1983), also titled Like Father & Son, is an American drama film directed by Eric Weston and written by Wanda Dell and Eric Weston based on a novel by Frankcina Glass. Marvin (played by John Cassavetes), a heavy-drinking widower who has seen better days and makes a living taking odd jobs, meets suicidal youngster Tige.

== Cast ==
- John Cassavetes as Marvin Stewart
- Billy Dee Williams as Richard Davis
- Gibran Brown as Tige Jackson
- Denise Nicholas as Vanessa Jackson (as Denise Nicholas-Hill)
- Fay Hauser as Brenda Davis
- Georgia Allen as Carrie Carter
