= Denise Nicholas =

American actress, social activist (born 1944)

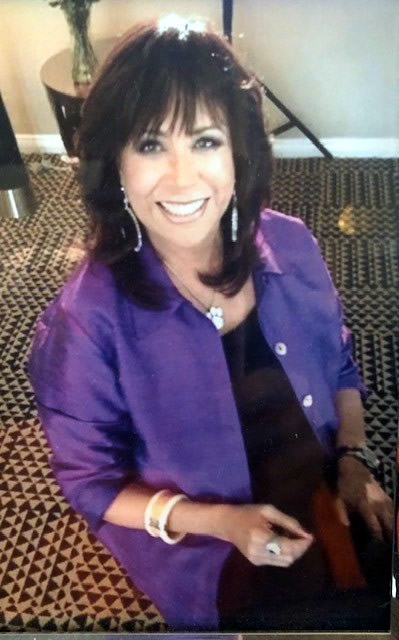
- Nicholas, 2015.
- Born: Denise Donna Nicholas; July 12, 1944 (age 82); Detroit, Michigan, U.S.
- Occupation: Actress
- Years active: 1967–2003; 2015
- Spouses: Gilbert Moses (m. 1964; div. 1967) Bill Withers (m. 1973; div. 1974) Jim Hill (m. 1981; div. 1987)

Denise Donna Nicholas (born July 12, 1944) is an American actress. Nicholas played high-school guidance counselor Liz McIntyre on the ABC comedy-drama series Room 222 and Councilwoman Harriet DeLong on the NBC/CBS drama series In the Heat of the Night.

== Biography ==
=== Early life and education ===
Nicholas was born to Louise and Otto Nicholas in Detroit, where she spent her early years. With the remarriage of her mother to Robert Burgen, she moved to Milan, Michigan, a small town south of Ann Arbor. At the age of 16, Nicholas appeared on the August 25, 1960, cover of Jet magazine as a future school teacher prospect at the National High School Institute at Northwestern University. She graduated from Milan High School in 1961. Nicholas is the middle child of three, with an older brother, Otto, and a younger sister, Michele, who was murdered in 1980.

Nicholas entered the University of Michigan as a pre-law student. She then switched her major to Latin-American politics, Spanish, and English before dropping out after her second completed academic year. Nicholas moved to New York City and worked for the J. Walter Thompson (JWT) advertising firm. She subsequently transferred to Tulane University, where she majored in fine arts. Her acting debut was in a Spanish-language play presented by her language class. Nicholas dropped out of Tulane University as well, this time to join the Free Southern Theater (FST), during the Civil Rights Movement. After spending two years touring the deep South with the FST, Nicholas went to New York City and joined the Negro Ensemble Company, working in all its first season productions. From the stage of the St. Mark's Playhouse in New York, Nicholas was cast as Liz McIntyre, the guidance counselor on the ABC series Room 222. Nicholas received her Bachelor of Arts in drama from the University of Southern California (USC) theater program in 1987, after living in Southern California for several years.

=== Career ===
Nicholas began her television acting career in 1968, with an episode of It Takes a Thief. She had three consecutive (1970–1972) Golden Globe nominations for Best Actress in a Drama TV Series, for her role as Liz McIntyre on the ABC comedy-drama series Room 222. Following Room 222 (1969–1974), she won two Image Awards in 1976 for Outstanding Actress in a Motion Picture and Outstanding Actress in a Drama Series, for her role as Beth Foster in Let's Do It Again (1975). Nicholas also played Olivia Ellis on Baby... I'm Back!, a sitcom that aired on CBS in 1978.

Nicholas wrote the song "Can We Pretend," which her husband Bill Withers recorded on his 1974 album +'Justments. She later appeared as Harriet DeLong in the cast of NBC/CBS' In the Heat of the Night (1989–1995). Nicholas wrote six episodes of the series, thus beginning her second career as a writer. When that show was cancelled, she enrolled in the Professional Writing Program at USC, eventually finding her way to the Journeymen's Writing Workshop under the tutelage of author Janet Fitch. She worked with Fitch for five years. Nicholas also attended the Squaw Valley Community of Writers Workshop, and the Natalie Goldberg Workshop, in Taos, New Mexico.

Nicholas's first novel, Freshwater Road, was published by Agate Publishing, in August 2005. It received a starred review in Publishers Weekly and was selected as one of the best books of 2005 by The Washington Post, The Detroit Free Press, The Atlanta Journal-Constitution, Newsday and the Chicago Tribune. The novel won the Zora Neale Hurston/Richard Wright Award for debut fiction in 2006, as well as the American Library Association's Black Caucus Award for debut fiction the same year. Freshwater Road was reprinted by Pocket Books. Brown University commissioned Nicholas to write a staged adaptation of Freshwater Road, which was presented in May 2008. As of 2022 Nicholas was completing her memoir, to be published by Agate Publishing in 2025.

== Personal life ==
At 19, Nicholas dropped out of the University of Michigan and signed up with the Free Southern Theater in New Orleans, headed by Gilbert Moses, whom she married in May 1964 at the American Theater in New York, and divorced in 1967.

Nicholas married soul singer-songwriter Bill Withers on January 17, 1973. Their relationship had been volatile prior to their nuptials. In November 1972, Nicholas told authorities that Withers flew to Tucson, Arizona, where she was filming The Soul of Nigger Charley, and assaulted her in a motel room after she threatened to end their relationship, but she refused to press charges. She filed for divorce in April 1974, and their divorce was finalized in December 1974.

In February 1980, Nicholas's younger sister Michele Burgen, a 26-year-old editor for Ebony magazine, was shot to death. Her body was found in a locked rental car at LaGuardia Airport in New York City. Nicholas and her older brother Otto searched the country for clues, but no suspect was ever taken to trial.

While coping with the loss of her sister, Nicholas met CBS sports anchor Jim Hill at a Sacramento poetry reading in June 1980. They married on Valentine's Day in 1981. The couple separated in October 1981 and she filed for divorce, before reconciling soon after. Nicholas filed for divorce again in 1984. The divorce was finalized in 1987.

== Acting credits ==
=== Films ===
Year	Title	Role	Notes
1972	Blacula	Michelle	
1973	The Soul of Nigger Charley	Elena	
1975	Mr. Ricco	Irene Mapes	
1975	Let's Do It Again	Beth Foster	
1977	A Piece of the Action	Lila French	
1977	Capricorn One	Betty Walker	
1983	Marvin & Tige	Vanessa Jackson	credited as Denise Nicholas-Hill
1990	Ghost Dad	Joan	
2000	Ritual	Sylvia / Mother	
2004	Proud	Gordon's Mother	
2015	Mr. Fantastic & The Wonderful Depot	Charlotte Bulivar	

=== Television ===
Year	Title	Role	Notes
1968	It Takes a Thief	Toosdhi	"To Catch a Roaring Lion"
1969	The F.B.I.	Nora Tobin	"Eye of the Storm"
1967–1969	N.Y.P.D.	Mrs. Ward / Ethel	6 episodes Season 1 (2 episodes) — #1.11 "The Witness" (1967) — #1.14 "The Bombers" (1967); Season 2 (4 episodes) — #2.2 "Encounter on a Rooftop" (1968) — #2.05 "Deadly Circle of Violence" (1968) — #2.15 "Three-Fifty-Two" (1969) — #2.20 "Face on the Dart Board" (1969)
1969–1974	Room 222	Liz McIntrye	series regular (113 episodes)
1971	Five Desperate Women	Joy	ABC Movie of the Week
1971	Night Gallery	Kyro (segment Logoda's Heads)	"The Different Ones/Tell David/Logoda's Heads"
1971	Day of Absence	Second Operator	TV Movie
1972	Love, American Style	unknown role (segment Love and the Split-Up)	"Love and the Alibi/Love and the Instant Father/Love and the Lovely Evening/Love and the Split-Up"
1975	Police Story	Candy Priest	"A Community of Victims"
1975	Rhoda	Denise Culp	"The Party"
1975	Marcus Welby, M.D.	Myrna Kelland	"The Strange Behavior of Paul Kelland"
1977–1978	Baby... I'm Back!	Olivia Ellis	series regular (13 episodes)
1978	Rick of Passion	Marva Trotter Louis	TV Movie
1979	The Paper Chase	Donna Scott	"A Matter of Anger"
1980	Benson	Carol Walker	"Just Friends"
1980	Diff'rent Strokes	Sondra Williams	"Substitute Mother"
1980–1982	The Love Boat	Jenny Brooks/Maura Belloque	3 episodes Season 3 (2 episodes) — #3.18 "Kinfolk/Sis & and the Slicker/Moonlight & Moonshine/Too Close for Comfort/The Affair: Part 1" (1980) — #3.19 "Kinfolk/Sis & the Slicker/Moonlight & Moonshine/Too Close for Comfort/The Affair: Part 2" (1980); Season 5 (1 episode) — #5.26 "Pal-I-Mony-O-Mine/Does Father Know Best?/An 'A' for Gopher" (1982)
1981	The Big Stuffed Dog	Nurse Riley	TV Movie
1981	Aloha Paradise	Carrie	"Letter from Broadway/Letter from Cyrano/Letter from a Secret Admirer"
1981	The Sophisticated Gents	Pat Henderson	Miniseries (3 episodes)
1981	Jacqueline Susann's Valley of the Dolls	Connie	Miniseries (2 episodes) credited as Denise Nicholas Hill
1981	Secrets of Midland Heights	Julie Hammond	2 episodes — #1.06 "The Race" — #1.09 "Reunion of Strangers"
1983	One Day at a Time	Susan Bryant	"Baby Love: Part 2"
1983	Masquerade	Sheila Walters	"Pilot"
1984	Magnum, P.I.	T.C.'s Date	"I Witness" credited as Denise Nicholas-Hill
1985	And the Children Shall Lead	Mother	TV Movie
1987	Hotel	Mrs. Blake	"And Baby Makes Two"
1988	227	Jeannie Smith	"Shall We Dance?"
1988	Amen	Mrs. Kirby	"The Widow"
1988	Supercarrier	unknown role	"Deadly Enemies" (alternate title "Pilot")
1989	The Cosby Show	Lorraine	"Birthday Blues"
1989	Heart and Soul	Jean Kincaid	TV Movie
1989	Mother's Day	Elizabeth Sturgis	TV Movie
1989–1995	In the Heat of the Night	Harriet DeLong / Harriet Delong Gillespie	recurring role (Season 3–5; 19 episodes) series regular (Season 6–7; 46 episodes) guest role (Season 8; 4 episodes); Writer (6 episodes); Season 5 (1 episode) — "#5.15 "Odessa" (written by) Season 6 (2 episodes) — #6.10 "Flowers from a Lady" (written by) — #6.19 "Legacy" (written by); Season 7 (3 episodes) — #7.11 "Little Girl Lost" (written by) — #7.12 "Your Own Kind" (written by) —#7.21 "Poor Relations" (written by)
1990	A Different World	Carol Garrison	"Here's to Old Friends"
1990	B.L. Stryker	Darlene Carter	"Plates"
1990	On Thin Ice: The Tai Babilonia Story	Cleo Babilonia	TV Movie
1992	Hangin' with Mr. Cooper	Mrs. Walker	"My Dinner with Mark"
1995	The Parent 'Hood	Miss Hicks	"A Kiss Is Just a Kiss"
1997	Living Single	Lilah James	2 episodes
1997	The Rockford Files: Shoot-Out at the Golden Pagoda	Leddy Hutch	TV Movie
2002	My Wife and Kids	Ann Kyle	"Failure to Communicate"

=== Theatre ===
Year	Production	Role	Theatre(s)	Notes
1982	Dame Lorraine	Angela Moulineaux	Los Angeles Actors Theatre	
1968	Song of the Lusitanian Bogey		St. Mark's Playhouse	Revival of earlier production.
1968	Daddy Goodness	Lena	St. Mark's Playhouse	
1968	Kongi's Harvest	Praise Singer	St. Mark's Playhouse	
1968	Song of the Lusitanian Bogey		St. Mark's Playhouse	
1967	One Last Look	April Baylor	Old Reliable Theater Tavern	
1966	Viet Rock		Martinique Theatre	

== Awards and nominations ==
Year	Association	Category	Production	Result
1970	Golden Globe Awards	Best TV Actress - Drama	Room 222 as Liz McIntyre	Nominated
1971	Golden Globe Awards	Best TV Actress - Drama	Room 222 as Liz McIntyre	Nominated
1972	Golden Globe Awards	Best TV Actress - Drama	Room 222 as Liz McIntyre	Nominated
1976	NAACP Image Awards	Outstanding Actress in a Motion Picture	Let's Do It Again	Won
1989	NAACP Image Awards	Outstanding Lead Actress in a Motion Picture, Mini-Series or Television Movie	Mother's Day	Nominated
