= Mother's Day (1989 film) =

1989 television film by Susan Rohrer

- Written by: B.W. Sandefur
- Directed by: Susan Rohrer
- Starring: Denise Nicholas; Malcolm-Jamal Warner
- Composer: Brent Havens
- Country of origin: United States
- Original language: English

Production
- Executive producer: Harry Young
- Producer: Susan Rohrer
- Cinematography: Stanley E. Gilbert
- Editor: Earl Waggoner
- Running time: 95 minutes
- Production company: CBN Producers Group

Original release
- Network: CBN Family Channel
- Release: May 13, 1989

Mother's Day is a 1989 American crime drama television film directed and produced by Susan Rohrer. The film follows a determined mother (played by Denise Nicholas) who battles a stacked deck of evidence incriminating her 19-year-old son (played by Malcolm-Jamal Warner) in the drug-related killing. It is the CBN Family Channel's first television film.
