= The Big Stuffed Dog =

- Written by: Charles Schulz
- Directed by: Robert Fuest
- Starring: Noah Beery; Mildred Dunnock; Robert Ginty; Gordon Jump; Denise Nicholas; Abe Vigoda; Rossie Harris; Sydney Penny
- Music by: Ed Bogas; Judy Munsen
- Country of origin: United States
- Original language: English

Production
- Producer: Whitney Green
- Cinematography: David Crommie (director of photography)
- Editor: Paul Preuss
- Running time: 48 mins
- Production companies: Lee Mendelson Film Productions; Charles M. Schulz Creative Associates

Original release
- Network: NBC
- Release: February 8, 1981

The Big Stuffed Dog is a 1981 children's film about the adventures of a plush Snoopy. It was produced by Lee Mendelson Film Productions and was broadcast on NBC as part of its Project Peacock series which featured family-based specials and programming.

== Plot ==
A little boy named Petey takes his big Snoopy doll on his airplane trip, only to lose it after landing at the airport. Petey looks for the doll as it goes on an adventure of its own and is passed around from person to person.

== Cast ==
- Rossie Harris as Petey
- Sydney Penny as Lily
- Noah Beery as Petey's Grandfather
- Mildred Dunnock as Petey's Grandmother
- Robert Ginty as Petey's Father
- Gordon Jump as Crazy
- Denise Nicholas as Nurse Riley
- Abe Vigoda as Carnival Pitchman
- Mel Stewart as Superintendent
- David-James Carroll as Grandson
- Arthur Rosenberg as Businessman
- Sharon Spelman as Amy Pearson
- Scott Beach as Minister
- Tom Dahlgren as Doctor
- Greg Diez as Ticket Agent
- R.J. Ganzert as Mack
- Andre Gower as Andy
- Robbie Kiger as Robbie
- Stuart Lake as Raunch
- Debbie Muller as Bride
- Terry David Mulligan as Groom
- Michael Pritchard as Link

== Production ==
Peanuts creator, cartoonist Charles Schulz, wrote the script. Comparing the experience to the many Peanuts television specials, Schulz said, "When we did The Big Stuffed Dog it was a pleasure working with adult professional actors who took some of the lines I had written and really brought them to life. I'm afraid that many of the child actors don't bring the lines up to the level you would really like."
