= Nevis Mountain Dew =

1978 play written by Steve Carter

- Original language: English
- Written by: steve carter
- Series: The Caribbean Trilogy: Eden; Nevis Mountain Dew; Dame Lorraine
- Subject: The evening of the 50th birthday celebration of the family patriarch who is confined to an iron lung.
- Genre: Drama
- Setting: 1950s; Queens section of New York City

Premiere
- Date: December 7, 1978
- Place: St. Mark's Playhouse; New York City

Nevis Mountain Dew is a 1978 play by American playwright steve carter. Set in the 1950s, it is the second of Carter's Caribbean trilogy. Nevis Mountain Dew explores the subject of euthanasia involving the patriarch of an affluent family who is confined to an iron lung.

== Characters ==
Jared Philibert
The 50-year-old patriarch of an affluent Caribbean-American family. Due to being afflicted with paralysis, he is confined to an iron lung.
Everalda Philibert Griffin
Jared's sister and the family member primarily responsible for his care.
Zepora Philibert
A younger sister of Jared.
Billie Philbert
The African American wife of Jared.
Ayton Morris
A family friend.
Boise McCanles
A co-worker of Billie's.
Lud Gaithers
Another co-worker of Billie's and Boise's friend.

== Plot synopsis ==
Set in the Queens borough of New York City in 1954, a Caribbean-American family gathers to celebrate the 50th birthday of Jared Philibert, who is confined to an iron lung due to paralysis. Ayton, Jared's best friend, arrives at the party with a bottle of rum called "Nevis Mountain Dew." When people drink it, the rum seems to act as a truth serum.

== Origins of the play ==
Nevis Mountain Dew is loosely based on the experience of a patient that the playwright encountered while working in a hospital. The play is dedicated to him.

== Original off-Broadway production ==
- Directed by Horacena J. Taylor
- Produced by Negro Ensemble Company (NEC)
- Artistic Director: Douglas Turner Ward
- Managing Director: Gerald S. Krone
- Set Designer: Wynn P. Thomas
- Costume Designer: Alvin B. Perry
- Lighting Designer: Larry Johnson
- Press Representative: Howard Atlee
- Production Stage Manager: Clinton Turner Davis
- Opened: December 7, 1978, at St. Mark's Playhouse

=== Cast ===
- Graham Brown – Jared Philibert
- Frances Foster – Everalda Philibert Griffin
- Barbara Montgomery – Billie Philibert
- Ethel Ayler – Zepora Philibert
- Arthur French – Ayton Morris
- Samm-Art Williams – Boise McCanles
- Charles Brown – Lud Gaithers

=== Understudies ===
- Ethel Ayler
- Leon Morenzie
- Chuck Patterson
- Olivia Williams

Nevis Mountain Dew was selected among ten New York City productions as one of "The Best Plays of 1978–1979."

== Washington, D.C., production ==
- Directed by Horacena J. Taylor
- Produced by Negro Ensemble Company (NEC)
- Opened: April 20, 1979, at Arena Stage:Kreeger Theatre

=== Cast ===
- Graham Brown – Jared Philibert
- Frances Foster – Everalda Philibert Griffin
- Barbara Montgomery – Billie Philibert
- Ethel Ayler – Zepora Philibert
- Arthur French – Ayton Morris
- Samm-Art Williams – Boise McCanles
- Charles Brown – Lud Gaithers

== Los Angeles production (West Coast premiere) ==
- Directed by Edmund Cambridge
- Produced by Los Angeles Actors Theatre
- Opened: January 1982 at Los Angeles Actors Theatre

=== Cast ===
- Graham Brown – Jared Philibert
- Esther Rolle – Everalda Philibert Griffin
- Lee Chamberlain – Billie Philibert
- Roxie Roker – Zepora Philibert
- Lincoln Kilpatrick – Ayton Morris
- Hal Williams – Boise McCanles
- David Downing – Lud Gaithers

== Comparison with Whose Life Is It Anyway? ==
Both Nevis Mountain Dew and Brian Clark's Whose Life Is It Anyway? were selected as one of the ten best plays of the 1978–1979 season in New York City. Each play tackles the subject of euthanasia through the eyes of a man that has become paralyzed. Otis L. Guernsey Jr., editor of The Best Plays of 1978–1979 theatre yearbook, which recognized the two productions that season, made the following observation:

"Nevis Mountain Dew of course invites comparison with this season's British script on much the same subject, Whose Life Is It Anyway?, and the NEC variation on this theme holds its own. It doesn't confront its invalid's question "To be or not to be?" as polemically as its British counterpart, but it takes a similar stand and a closer look at the effects of such a prolongued [sic] calamity on those surrounding the victim."

== Awards and recognition ==
- 1979: Selection, Burns Mantle, The Best Plays of 1978–1979
- 1982 Los Angeles Drama Critics Circle Award – Lead Performance (Graham Brown)
