= Home (Williams play) =

1979 play by Samm-Art Williams

- 2024 Broadway Revival Promotional Poster
- Written by: Samm-Art Williams
- Characters: Cephus Miles; Patty Mae Wells; Woman Two
- Original language: English
- Genre: Drama
- Setting: North Carolina, 1950s

Premiere
- Date premiered: 1979
- Place premiered: St. Mark's Playhouse

Home is a dramatic stage play written by American playwright Samm-Art Williams. The play originally premiered on Broadway at the Cort Theatre on May 7, 1980. The play enjoyed critical and financial success, being nominated for the Drama Desk Award and Tony Award for Best Play and running for a total of 278 performances.

The play was revived on Broadway in 2024, directed by Kenny Leon, as part of the Roundabout Theatre Company's season at the Todd Haimes Theatre. The revival opened on June 5, 2024.

== Characters ==
- Cephus Miles, a young southern farmer
- Patty Mae Wells/Woman One, a young southern woman, girlfriend of Cephus
- Woman Two, plays various characters in Cephus and Patty Mae's lives

== Original cast and characters ==
Character	Off-Broadway	Broadway	Broadway Revival
Character	1979	1980	2024
Cephus Miles	Charles Brown	Charles Brown	Tory Kittles
Patty Mae Wells	L. Scott Caldwell	L. Scott Caldwell	Brittany Inge
Woman Two	Michele Shay	Michele Shay	Stori Ayers

== Production history ==
=== Broadway (1980) ===
The play was originally produced Off-Broadway by the Negro Ensemble Company, later transferring to Broadway. The original Broadway production was directed by Douglas Turner Ward. For his performance in the original production, Charles Brown was nominated for the Tony Award for Best Actor in a Play. In the notes of the play script, Williams dedicated the play to the people of Burgaw, North Carolina and his mother, Valdosia Williams.

=== Broadway revival (2024) ===
A revival of the play was announced to be part of Roundabout Theatre Company's season, directed by Kenny Leon. This was the show's first Broadway revival since the original closed on January 4, 1981. The production began previews on May 17, 2024 and officially opened on June 5.

The production received a Drama League Award nomination for Best Revival of a Play, along with Stori Ayers receiving a nomination for Distinguished Performance. It also was nominated for the Drama Desk Award for Outstanding Revival of a Play.
