= Edmund Cambridge =

American actor (1920–2001)

- Born: Edmund James Cambridge, Jr. September 18, 1920; New York City, U.S.
- Died: August 18, 2001 (aged 80); New York City, U.S.
- Other names: Ed Cambridge; Edmund J. Cambridge
- Years active: 1936–2001
- Height: 5 ft 9 in (1.75 m)

Edmund James Cambridge Jr. (September 18, 1920 – August 18, 2001) was an American actor and director who was a founding member of the Negro Ensemble Company (NEC) and the Kilpatrick-Cambridge Theater Arts School.

== Biography ==
Cambridge was born on September 18, 1920 in Harlem, New York.

At age 15, Cambridge began his professional career at Swan's Paradise in Harlem as a chorus boy. This assignment ended when his mother discovered that he was sneaking out of bed to do the job. Edmund was the President of the Original Cambridge Players, who took a Los Angeles premiere of The Amen Corner to Broadway at the Ethel Barrymore Theater in April 1965. Founding member Juanita Moore was friends with Marlon Brando and James Baldwin. It was Moore who asked Brando to lend funds ($75) for Baldwin to write The Amen Corner.

In 1968, Cambridge joined Robert Hooks, Douglas Turner Ward and several other actors to start the Negro Ensemble Company. He staged Ceremonies in Dark Old Men, as one of the company's first productions. This Lonne Elder III play went on to win many awards, including a Drama Desk Award for the author. Other productions Cambridge directed at NEC include Steve Carter's critically acclaimed drama, Eden.

Cambridge was a longtime resident of Los Angeles. He died as a result of injuries sustained from a fall on August 18, 2001, in New York, New York.

== Selected credits ==
=== Acting ===
Theatre roles
Year	Production	Role	Theatre(s)	Notes
1978	One Crack Out	Earl	Marymount Manhattan Theatre	
1951	The Taming of the Shrew	Servant/ Officer	City Center	
1947	Our Lan'	Chester	Royale Theatre	

Television / Film roles
Year	Title	Role	Notes
1970	Bracken's World	Benjamin Bishop	Episode: Will Freddy's Real Father Please Stand Up?""
1971	The Bold Ones: The Lawyers (TV series)	Charles Mobley	Episode: "Hall of Justice"
1972	Evil Roy Slade	Smith	TV movie
1972	Love, American Style	Mr. Dickerson (segment "Love and Happy Days")	Episode: "Love and the Happy Days/Love and the Newscasters"
1972	Cool Breeze	The Bus Driver	credited as Edmund Cambridge
1972	Emergency!	Paul	Episode: "Crash" (as Edmund Cambridge)
1972	The Final Comedown	Dr. Smalls	credited as Edmund Cambridge
1972	Melinda	Detective	credited as Edmund Cambridge
1972	The Sandy Duncan Show	George	Episode: "The Importance of Being Ernestine"
1972	Trouble Man	Sam	film role
1972	The Limit	Police captain	film role
1972	Hit Man	Theatis Oliver	film role
1974	Good Times	Leroy Jackson	Episode: "Junior Gets a Patron" (as Edmund Cambridge)
1974	Kojak	Waverly	Episode: "Loser Takes All" (as Edmund Cambridge)
1974	Adam-12	Don Hendricks	Episode: "Christmas" (as Edmund Cambridge)
1975	Sanford and Son	Mr. Cambridge	Episode: "Strange Bedfellows" (as Edmund Cambridge)
1975	Mannix	Scrapiron	Episode: "Edge of the Web" (as Edmund Cambridge)
1975	Starsky and Hutch	Roy Jones	Episode: "Kill Huggy Bear"
1975	Friday Foster	Jake Wayne	film role
1974–1976	Harry O	Joseph "Hotwire" Jackson / Benjy	2 episodes, (as Edmund Cambridge)
1976	The Jeffersons	Curt Randall	Episode: "Tom the Hero" (as Edmund Cambridge)
1976	Rich Man, Poor Man Book II	Funeral director	Episode: "Chapter XII" (as Edmund Cambridge)
1977	Serpico	Lucius	Episode: "One Long Tomorrow" (as Edmund Cambridge)
1980	The Further Adventures of Wally Brown	Stockley Brown	TV movie
1985	The Atlanta Child Murders	Mr. Cobb	2 episodes
1987	The Spirit	small role	TV movie, Uncredited
1989	Tour of Duty	Preacher	Episode: "Promised Land"
1990	True Colors		Episode: "Young at Heart"
1991	Bill & Ted's Bogus Journey	George Washington Carver	feature film role
1992	Deep Cover	Crackhead #2	feature film role
1992	The Fresh Prince of Bel-Air	Lou	Episode: "Mommy Nearest" (as Ed Cambridge Jr.)
1993	The Gifted	minor role	feature film
1994	One Woman's Courage	Commander	TV movie
1994	ER	Victor	Episode: "Day One"
1994	Jack Reed: A Search for Justice	Minister	TV movie
1994	Inferno on US 17	Andrew	TV movie
1996	Soul of the Game	Bellhop	TV movie
1996	Living Single	Carriage Driver	Episode: "The Engagement: Part 1"
1997	The Beautician and the Beast	Elderly Man	film role
1997	The Good News	Associate Pastor Blake	Episode: "Pilot"
1997	Sister, Sister	Mr. Knox	Episode: "It's My Party"
1998	Veronica's Closet	Elderly Man #3	Episode: "Veronica's Mole"
2000	Waking the Dead	Old Man from Letter	film role
2000	City of Angels	Bertram	Episode: "Unhand Me"
2001	The Bernie Mac Show	Grandfather at Airport	Episode: "Pilot", (final appearance)

=== Directing ===
Country Cousins (1988) — Far from the Tree (1987)

Year	Production	Theatre(s)	Notes
1981	Nevis Mountain Dew	Los Angeles Actors Theatre	
1980	Eden	Los Angeles Actors Theatre	Los Angeles Drama Critics Circle Award
1976	Eden	St. Mark's Playhouse	
1971	Behold! Cometh the Vanderkellans	Theatre de Lys	
1969	Ceremonies in Dark Old Men	St. Mark's Playhouse	

== Awards and nominations ==
=== Awards ===
- 1980 Los Angeles Drama Critics Circle Award – Direction, Eden
