= Billy Williams =

American baseball player (born 1938)

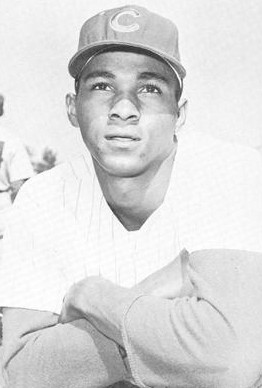
- Williams with the Chicago Cubs in 1964
- Left fielder
- Born: June 15, 1938 (age 88); Whistler, Alabama, U.S.
- Batted: Left Threw: Right

MLB debut
- August 6, 1959, for the Chicago Cubs

Last MLB appearance
- October 2, 1976, for the Oakland Athletics

MLB statistics
- Batting average: .290
- Hits: 2,711
- Home runs: 426
- Runs batted in: 1,475
- Stats at Baseball Reference

Teams
- As player: Chicago Cubs (1959–1974); Oakland Athletics (1975–1976); As coach: Chicago Cubs (1980–1982); Oakland Athletics (1983–1985); Chicago Cubs (1986–1987, 1992–2001)

Career highlights and awards
- 6× All-Star (1962², 1964, 1965, 1968, 1972, 1973); NL Rookie of the Year (1961); NL batting champion (1972); Chicago Cubs No. 26 retired; Chicago Cubs Hall of Fame

Member of the National

Baseball Hall of Fame
- Induction: 1987
- Vote: 85.7% (sixth ballot)

Billy Leo Williams (born June 15, 1938) is an American former left fielder and coach in Major League Baseball (MLB) who played from 1959 to 1976, almost entirely for the Chicago Cubs. A six-time All-Star, Williams was named the 1961 National League (NL) Rookie of the Year after hitting 25 home runs with 86 runs batted in (RBI). A model of consistent production, he went on to provide the Cubs with at least 20 home runs and 80 RBI every year through 1973, batting over .300, hitting 30 home runs and scoring 100 runs five times each. Along with Ernie Banks and Ron Santo, Williams was one of the central figures in improving the Cubs' fortunes in the late 1960s after the club had spent 20 years in the bottom half of the league standings. His 853 RBI and 2,799 total bases in the 1960s were the most by any left-handed hitter in the major leagues.

In 1970, Williams was the runner-up in voting for the NL Most Valuable Player Award (MVP) after leading the major leagues with 137 runs, 205 hits and 373 total bases, also hitting 42 home runs with 129 RBI, all career highs; excepting his run and home runs totals, each remains the single season team record for left-handed hitters. In 1972, he was again the runner-up in MVP voting after winning the NL batting title with a .333 average, adding 37 home runs and 122 RBI while leading the major leagues in total bases and slugging percentage; in both years, he lost the award to Johnny Bench of the Cincinnati Reds. Williams played 1,117 consecutive games between September 1963 and September 1970, holding the NL record from 1969 to 1983. He was traded to the Oakland Athletics after the 1974 season, becoming a designated hitter in the American League (AL), and contributed 23 home runs and 81 RBI to finally reach the postseason as the team won their fifth consecutive division title.

When he retired, Williams' 426 career home runs and 4,599 total bases each ranked eighth in major league history among left-handed hitters; his 302 home runs as a left fielder trailed only Ralph Kiner in NL history. His 392 home runs, 2,510 hits, 1,353 RBI and 4,262 total bases with the Cubs are all team records for left-handed hitters, as were his 402 doubles until Mark Grace passed him in 1999. He led NL left fielders in assists and double plays four times each, and in putouts and fielding percentage three times each; at the end of his career, he ranked fifth in NL history in games in left field (1,737), and fourth in fielding percentage (.974), sixth in putouts (2,811) and total chances (3,005), and ninth in assists (116) in the NL after 1900. He later became a coach with the Cubs for nearly two decades. Williams was inducted into the National Baseball Hall of Fame in 1987, and was selected as a member of the Cubs All-Century Team in 1999.

== Early life ==
Billy Williams was born in Whistler, Alabama. His father Frank was a stevedore who had also played first base for the semipro Whistler Stars. Williams grew up in a segregated neighborhood, and attended Whistler High School. Entering professional baseball in 1956, Williams started his minor league career with the Ponca City Cubs of the Sooner State League. After returning to Ponca City in 1957 and hitting 17 home runs, Williams split 1958 between the Burlington Bees and Pueblo Bruins.

In his autobiography, Williams recalled that he had never experienced overt racial discrimination until his 1959 promotion to the Class AA San Antonio Missions in San Antonio, Texas. He was so discouraged that he left the team and went home. Buck O'Neil, the Cubs scout who had originally discovered Williams, was dispatched to Whistler, and he persuaded Williams to return to the team. During the 1959 season, he advanced to the Class AAA Fort Worth Cats and played 18 games for the Cubs after being called up in August. In 1960, he hit 26 home runs for the Class AAA Houston Buffs and played in 12 major league games after joining the Cubs in September.

== Major league career ==
=== Chicago Cubs ===
Williams joined a Chicago Cubs team that by the early 1960s featured stars such as Ernie Banks, Ferguson Jenkins, and Ron Santo. Rogers Hornsby (winner of seven NL batting titles), who by 1960 was serving as a scout and coach in the Cubs organization, predicted Williams would someday win a batting title.

Williams debuted with the Cubs on August 6, 1959, in a 4-2 win over the Philadelphia Phillies; as an indication of the expectations placed on him, he batted third, ahead of Banks. In his first plate appearance, he grounded out but drove in a run for his first RBI. Williams picked up his first two hits three days later after being moved up to second in the order, getting a pair of singles in a 10-inning, 5-3 loss to the Pittsburgh Pirates. However, he never raised his average above .200 in 18 games, batting just .152 (5-for-33), and failing to drive in a run in his last 15 appearances. He returned to the Cubs in late September 1960, with decidedly better results. He raised his average to as high as .368, with hits in his first seven games, before settling for a final .277 mark, and hit his first home run on October 1, a 2-run shot off Stan Williams in a 14-inning, 10-8 road win over the Los Angeles Dodgers. In 1961, Williams played in 146 games and was selected as the NL Rookie of the Year. That year, he hit 25 home runs and drove in 86 runs, batting .278. In 1962, 1964, and 1965, he was named an NL All-Star. On May 1, 1964, Williams had an RBI single and then capped off a 10-run 1st inning with a grand slam in the Cubs' 11-3 road win over the Houston Colt .45s; the five RBI in one inning set a team record. He won the NL Player of the Month Award for May with a .455 average, 8 home runs, and 22 RBI. Williams struggled defensively in the first few years of his career, leading NL outfielders in errors as a rookie. By the mid-1960s, his defense was no longer seen as a serious weakness. He returned to the All-Star Game in 1968, 1972, and 1973.

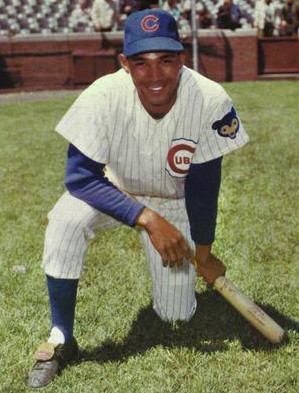
Williams in 1969

In each season from 1961 to 1973, Williams hit at least 20 home runs and drove in 84 or more runs. His batting swing was smooth and efficient, with quick wrist action that allowed him to hit for both average and power despite his slender frame. Early in his career, this earned him the nickname "Sweet-Swinging Billy Williams", sometimes shortened to "Sweet Williams" or "Sweet Billy". His nickname was later referenced in the subtitle of his autobiography. He was also nicknamed "Sweet-Swinging Billy from Whistler", in reference to his birthplace in Alabama. On July 17, 1966, in the second game of a road doubleheader against the St. Louis Cardinals, Williams hit for the cycle in the Cubs' 7-2 win, scoring after each hit; it was the seventh cycle by a Cubs player, the first natural cycle, and the second by a left-handed hitter. On May 21, 1968, he set a major league record by playing his 695th consecutive game in the outfield. On July 4, in a 7-4 loss to the Phillies, he broke Bill Nicholson's team record of 205 home runs by a left-handed hitter. On August 21, in the second game of a doubleheader against the Atlanta Braves, he had a career-high seven RBI in the Cubs' 13-5 win. On September 10, Williams had the only three-home-run game of his career in an 8-1 win over the New York Mets, with the last coming off Nolan Ryan; the previous day, he had had four hits, including a double and a pair of home runs, in a 10-3 win over the Phillies. The five home runs in consecutive games tied a major league record. On April 9, 1969, Williams had a career-high four doubles, tying another major league record, in the Cubs' 11-3 win over the Phillies. On June 29, in the second game of a doubleheader against the Cardinals, Williams played in his 896th consecutive game, breaking Stan Musial's NL record; he belted four hits, including a double and a pair of triples in the Cubs' 12-1 victory. On September 5, his two home runs and two doubles accounted for all the Cubs' hits in their 9-2 loss to the Pirates.

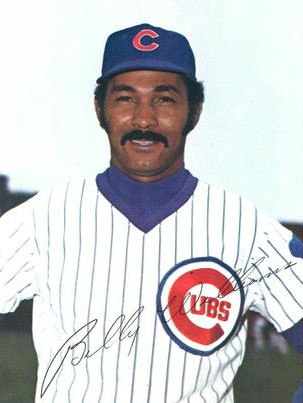
Williams in 1973

In 1970, Williams batted .322 with 42 homers and 129 RBI and finished second in the Most Valuable Player voting; surprisingly, despite batting .319 with 26 home runs and 80 RBI at the All-Star break, he was left off the All-Star team. On July 24, he had the only two hits in the Cubs' 9-0 loss to the Braves; it was the fourth time in his career that he had all the team's hits. Williams set an NL record for consecutive games played with 1,117 from 1963 to 1970 (this record was later eclipsed by Steve Garvey with 1,207 games played from 1975 to 1983). As his consecutive games streak began to accumulate, he was dubbed "Iron Man" by some writers. He co-authored a 1970 children's book called Iron Man, about his childhood. On May 12, 1971, he became the fifth player to drive in 1,000 runs for the Cubs with his 2-run home run in a 9-4 road win over the Phillies. Three days later, Williams hit his 300th career home run in a 6-4 win over the San Diego Padres, joining Banks as the second Cub to do so, and on August 17 he picked up his 2,000th hit, an 8th-inning single in a 5-4 road loss to the Braves; he was the fifth player to reach that total with the Cubs. In 1972, he was the NL batting champion and named the Major League Player of the Year by The Sporting News. He posted 37 home runs and 122 RBI while pacing the major leagues with a .333 batting average and a .606 slugging percentage. On July 11, Williams went 8-for-8 in a doubleheader against the Houston Astros at Wrigley Field, raising his batting average at that time from .310 to .328. In August, he won his second and final NL Player of the Month Award (.438 average, 9 home runs, 29 RBI); on August 26, he broke Stan Hack's team record of 2,193 hits by a left-handed hitter, tying his career high with five hits including a pair of home runs in a 10-inning, 10-9 win over the San Francisco Giants. For the second time, he was the MVP runner-up that year to Johnny Bench of the Cincinnati Reds. On June 15, 1973, in an 8-3 road loss to the Braves, he became the fourth player to appear in 2,000 games with the Cubs. On August 15, 1974, Williams became the third Cub to reach the 2,500 hit mark with an 8th-inning single in a 5-3 win over the Houston Astros.

=== Oakland Athletics ===
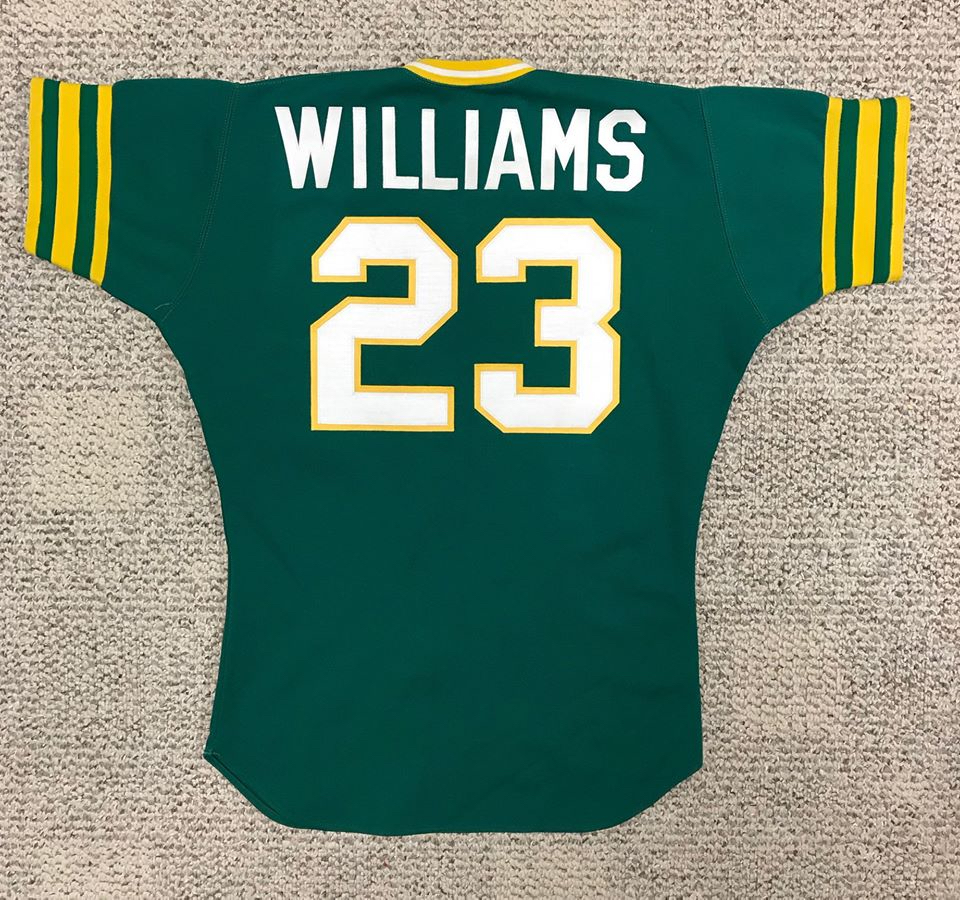
1975 Oakland Athletics #23 Billy Williams road jersey

In 1974 the Cubs finished in last place, with their worst record since 1966; after two years of declining production, with the lowest home run and RBI totals of his career, Williams was traded in October to the American League's Oakland Athletics for second baseman Manny Trillo and two pitchers. He helped lead Oakland to the 1975 AL West championship as a designated hitter, hitting 23 homers with 81 RBI, and on June 12 became the 16th player to hit 400 career home runs when he homered in a 9-7 road loss to the Milwaukee Brewers. In the postseason, the three-time defending World Series champions were swept in three games in the AL Championship Series by the Boston Red Sox, with Williams going hitless in 7 at bats. In 1976, Williams played in 120 games and hit only .211. He retired after playing his last major league game on October 2, picking up a single in his final plate appearance in a 14-inning, 9-8 win over the California Angels.

=== Career statistics ===
In 2,488 games over 18 seasons, Williams posted a .290 batting average with 2,711 hits in 9,350 at bats, 1,410 runs, 434 doubles, 88 triples, 426 home runs, 1,475 RBI, 90 stolen bases, 1,045 walks, a .361 on-base percentage and a .492 slugging percentage. Defensively, he recorded a combined .976 fielding percentage, including games at all three outfield positions and first base.

== Later years ==
Billy Williams's number 26 was retired by the Chicago Cubs in 1987.

Williams credited a grade-school teacher with encouraging him to always try to improve, citing the old saying, "Good, better, best / Never let it rest / Until the good is better / And the better is best."

Williams was inducted into the Baseball Hall of Fame in 1987. Two weeks later on August 13, Williams' uniform number 26 was retired at Wrigley Field. His was the second number to be retired by the Cubs, the first being Ernie Banks' number 14. Following his departure from the Cubs, the number was reassigned to other players from time to time, most notably Larry Biittner; Williams reclaimed it during several intervals of coaching with the Cubs after his playing days had ended.

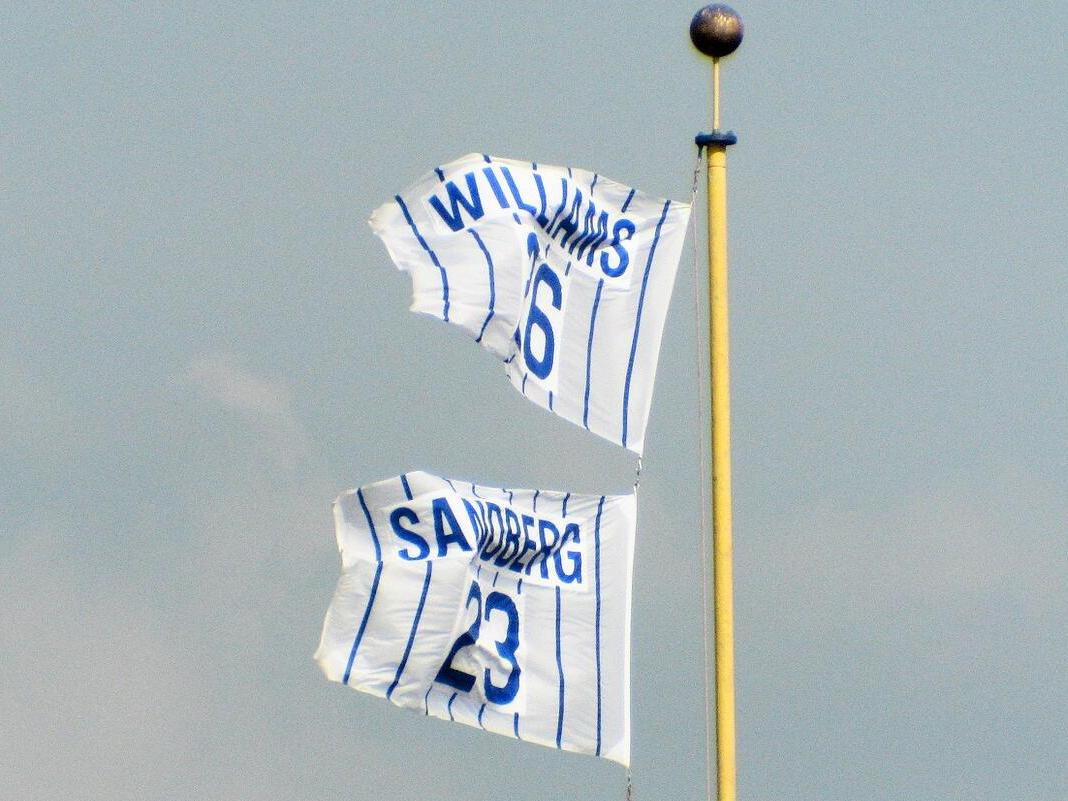
Retired number 26 at Wrigley Field

In 1999, he was selected to the Cubs All-Century Team and was named as one of 100 finalists to the Major League Baseball All-Century Team. During the 2010 season, the Cubs honored Williams with a statue outside Wrigley Field. The statue was unveiled in a pre-game ceremony before their home game on September 7 against the Astros.

In 2011, Williams was appointed as a member of the Hall of Fame's 16-member Golden Era Committee (part of the Veterans Committee), which considers ten Golden Era candidates every three years for the Hall of Fame. The ten candidates from the 1947 to 1972 era are first identified by the Baseball Writers' Association of America (BBWAA) appointed Historical Overview Committee (10-12 BBWAA members) every three years. Former Cubs third baseman Ron Santo was the only candidate elected to the Hall of Fame by the committee (including 8 members of the Hall of Fame) during their winter meetings in December 2011 (and 2014).

== See also ==
- List of Major League Baseball home run records
- List of Major League Baseball consecutive games played leaders
- List of Major League Baseball career home run leaders
- List of Major League Baseball career hits leaders
- List of Major League Baseball career runs scored leaders
- List of Major League Baseball career runs batted in leaders
- List of Major League Baseball career total bases leaders
- List of Major League Baseball batting champions
- List of Major League Baseball annual runs scored leaders
- List of Major League Baseball players to hit for the cycle

== Notes ==
Preceded by Willie Mays; César Cedeño	Major League Player of the Month; May 1964; July 1972	Succeeded by Jim Bunning; Ken Henderson
Preceded by Carl Yastrzemski	Hitting for the cycle July 17, 1966	Succeeded by Randy Hundley
