= Pecong (play) =

- Original language: English
- Written by: Steve Carter
- Subject: Retelling of the Medea story involving a sorceress who falls madly in love with a shallow womanizer.
- Genre: Drama
- Setting: c.1890s; Fictional Caribbean island.

Premiere
- Date: January 9, 1990
- Place: Victory Gardens Theatre; Chicago, Illinois

Pecong is a 1990 play by American playwright Steve Carter. Set "well in the past" on a fictional Caribbean island, the play tells the story of a sorceress who falls madly in love with a shallow womanizer.

== Original production ==
- Directed by Dennis Zacek
- Produced by Victory Gardens Theatre
- Artistic Director: Dennis Zacek
- Set designer: James Dardenne
- Costume designer: Claudia Boddy
- Lighting designer: Robert Shook
- Sound designer/stage manager: Galen G. Ramsey
- Composer/percussionist: Willy Steele
- Choreographer: TC Carson
- Assistant director: Sandra Jean Verthein

Opened: January 9, 1990 at the Ruth Page Dance Center

=== Cast ===
- Pat Bowie - Granny Root
- Celeste Williams - Mediyah
- Gary Yates - Cedric
- Catherine Slade - Persis
- Wandachristine - Faustina
- Ernest Perry, Jr. - Creon Pandit
- Diane White - Sweet Bella
- Daniel Oreskes - Jason Allcock
- Feleccia C. Boyd
- Shanesia L. Davis
- Lydia R. Gartin
- Shawn Goodwin
- Thomas W. Greene V
- Alison Halstead
- Dexter L. Warr
- Christopher Williams

– Oppidans

== Awards and nominations ==
- 1990 Jeff Award, Best New Work
- 1990 (Jeff Award), Willy Steele-Original Score
- 1993 Bay Area Drama Critics Award, Best Choreography (Halifu Osumare)

== Publication ==
Pecong is published by Broadway Play Publishing Inc.
