= Frances Foster =

American actress

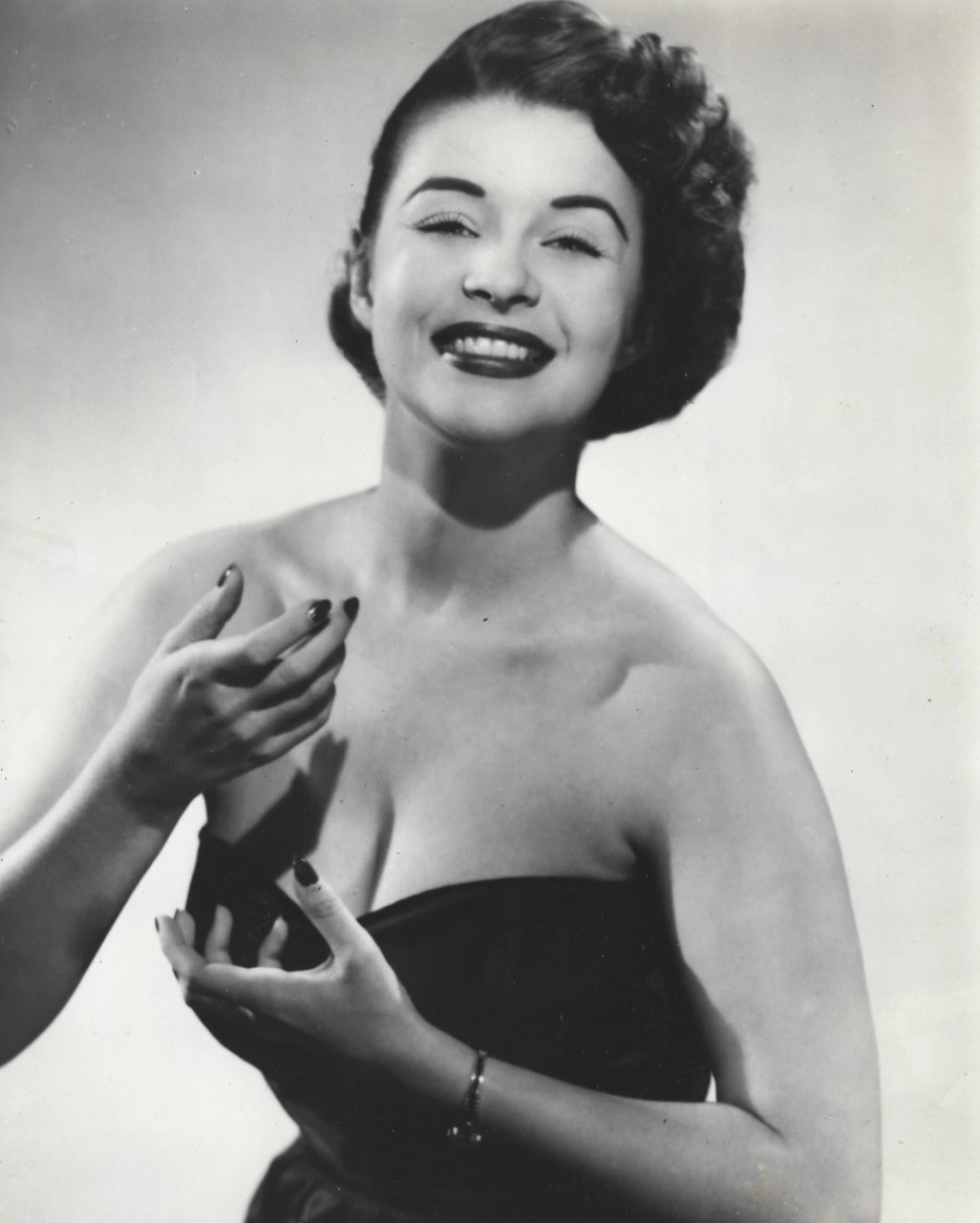
- Born: Frances Helen Brown; June 11, 1924; Yonkers, New York, U.S.
- Died: June 17, 1997 (aged 73); Fairfax, Virginia, U.S.
- Resting place: Pine Lawn Cemetery, Farmingdale, Long Island, New York, U.S.
- Occupations: Actress; theatre director; Beverly Tate
- Years active: 1950–1997
- Known for: Vera – Guiding Light
- Spouses: Robert Standfield Foster (m. 1941; died 1957); Roy Glenn (1961–1961); Morton Goldsen (m. 1983)
- Children: 4 stepchildren

Frances Helen Foster (née Brown; June 11, 1924 – June 17, 1997) was an American film, television and stage actress. In addition to being an actress, Foster was also an award–winning stage director and an original member of the Negro Ensemble Company. Moreover, in 1955, she became the first African American to appear in a nationally broadcast television commercial.

== Life and career ==
Foster was born in Yonkers, New York, the daughter of George H. Brown, a postal worker, and Helen E. Lloyd. From 1949 through 1952, she studied acting at American Theatre Wing in Manhattan; three years later, she made her stage debut as Dolly May in The Wisteria Trees at the City Center Theater. That same year, several black-owned papers reported that Foster had, on Procter & Gamble's behalf, gained the distinction of being the first African American to appear in a nationally aired television commercial. Many years later, in the days following her death, the New York Amsterdam News noted that Foster took great pride in being the one who had broken that barrier.

Foster was an original member of the Negro Ensemble Company, performing in over 25 of its productions from 1967 to 1986. She won a 1985 Obie Award for sustained excellence of performance. She was also a recipient of two AUDELCO Awards, one as an actress and the other as a director for work at the New Federal Theatre in Manhattan. In 1978, she received the best actress award for Do Lord Remember Me, and the best director award in 1983 for Hospice.

Foster also appeared in several films, including Malcolm X, Crooklyn, and Clockers, as well as the recurring role of Vera on the soap opera Guiding Light from 1985 to 1994. She's also known for her appearance as Gertie Vinson in one of the most infamous episodes of Good Times, "The Dinner Party". (In that episode, the character of Gertie is forced to eat dog food.)

== Personal life and death ==
Foster was married at least three times. In 1941 she married Robert Standfield Foster, with whom she had one child, a son. In June 1961, she married actor Roy Glenn. From 1983 until her own death, she was married to Morton Goldsen, acquiring three stepchildren from his previous marriage in the process.

On June 17, 1997, at age 73, Foster died of a cerebral hemorrhage at Fair Oaks Hospital in Fairfax, Virginia. In lieu of flowers being sent, Foster left instructions that donations be made in her name to Hale House in New York City, as well as Broadway Cares/Equity Fights AIDS. On September 15 a memorial service was conducted in Harlem at the Schomburg Center for Research in Black Culture. Foster's remains are interred at the Pine Lawn Cemetery in Farmingdale, Long Island, New York.

== Selected credits ==
=== Theatre ===
Year	Production	Role	Theatre(s)	Notes
1996	The Juror	Housewife, Juror		
1995	Having Our Say	Miss Sadie Delany (standby)	Booth Theatre	
1995	The Young Man from Atlanta	Clara	Signature Theatre	
1992	Malcolm X	Woman Outside Audubon Ballroom		
1990	Ground People	Viola	America Place Theatre	
1986	House of Shadows	Cassie	America Place Theatre	
1982	Do Lord Remember Me	Unknown	American Place Theatre	
1980	Zooman and the Sign	Ash Boswell	Theatre Four	
1978	Nevis Mountain Dew	Everelda Philibert Griffin	St. Mark's Playhouse	1979 Drama Desk Award nomination, Outstanding Featured Actress in a Play
1975	The First Breeze of Summer	Gremmer	Palace Theatre	
1972	The River Niger	Grandma Wilhelmina Brown	St. Mark's Playhouse; Brooks Atkinson Theatre	Originally an Off-Broadway production that was transferred to Broadway.
1971	Rosalee Pritchett	Rosalee 'Rose' Pritchett	St. Mark's Playhouse	
1970	The Good Woman of Setzuan	Mrs. Mi Tzu	Vivian Beaumont Theater	
1968	Kongi's Harvest	Ogbo Aweri; Segi	St. Mark's Playhouse	
1965	Day of Absence	Supervisor; Aide	St. Mark's Playhouse	Program of two one-act plays by Douglas Turner Ward.
1965	Happy Ending	Vi	St. Mark's Playhouse	Program of two one-act plays by Douglas Turner Ward.
1963	The Last Minstrel	Mrs. Ash	Pocket Theatre	
1959	A Raisin in the Sun	Ruth Younger (understudy); Beneatha Younger (understudy)	Ethel Barrymore Theatre; Belasco Theatre	
1956	Take a Giant Step	Violet	Jan Hus Playhouse	
1955	The Wisteria Trees	Dolly May	City Center Theater	
