= Simply Heavenly =

Musical comedy

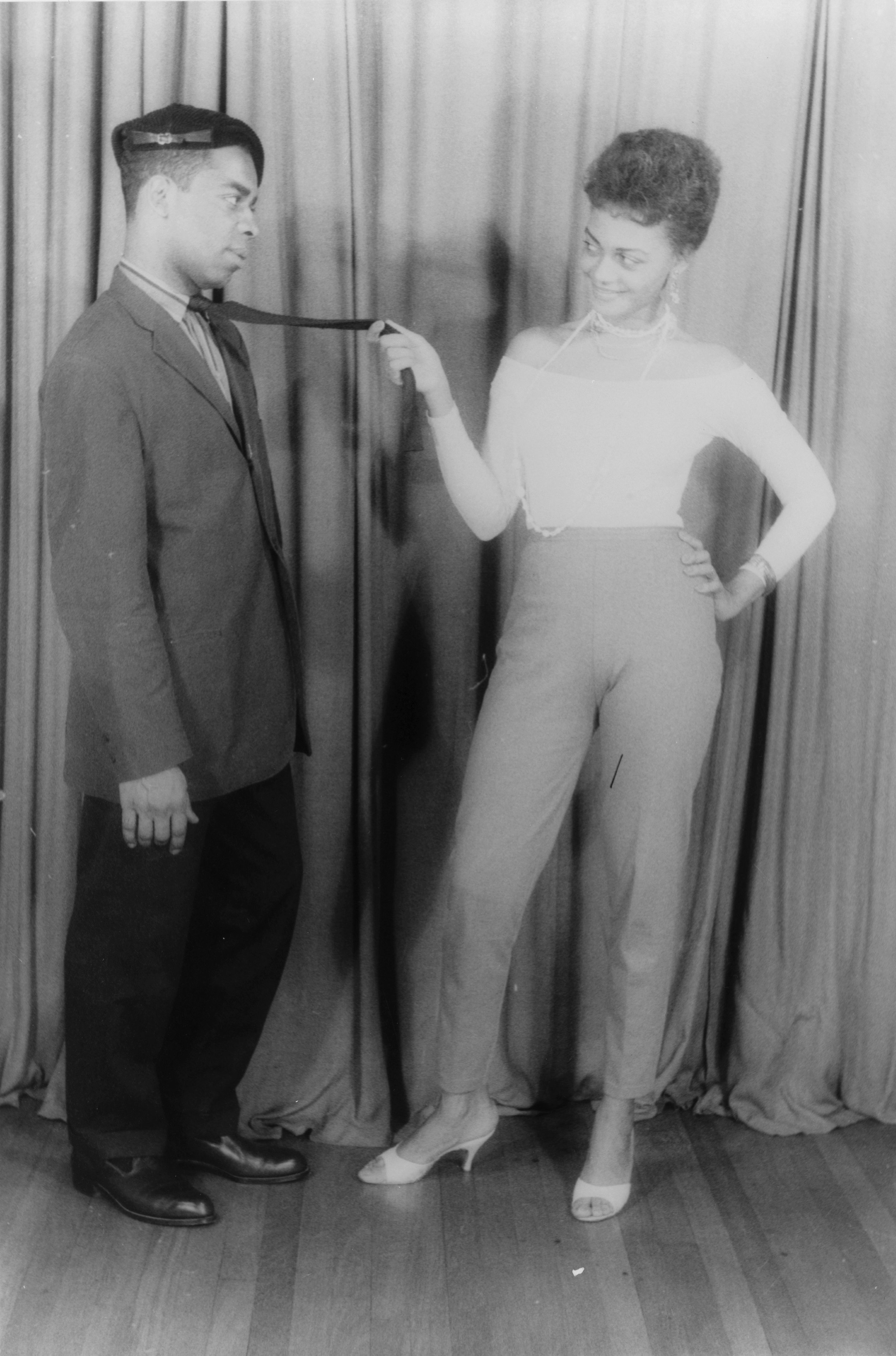
Ethel Ayler and Mel Stewart as Zirata and Simple in Simply Heavenly, 1957

Simply Heavenly is a musical comedy with book and lyrics by Langston Hughes and music by David Martin, based on Hughes' novel Simple Takes A Wife and other Simple stories.

The story is concerned with Jess Simple, an honest, easy-going man trying to raise enough money to divorce a wife he does not love in order to marry his new love while attempting unsuccessfully to escape a “hussy” called Zarita, who is bent on leading him astray. In the background are the many aspects of Harlem at the time—its jazz, its humor, and the universal problems of paying the rent and buying a shot of gin.

It was first produced Off-Broadway at the 85th Street Playhouse for 44 performances from May 21, 1957, before transferring to the Playhouse Theatre on Broadway for 62 performances from August 20, 1957. A London West End production played at the Adelphi Theatre, running for 16 performances from 20 May 1958.

The musical was revived by the Young Vic in London in March to April 2003. Its West End transfer at the Trafalgar Studios from October 2004 to May 2005 was nominated for an Olivier Award for Outstanding Musical Production.

== Plot ==
As the curtain rises, Simple is being informed by his landlady that he must walk her dog without complaining or pay his rent. Simple reluctantly agrees, as he is anxious to visit Joyce. Joyce waits in her furnished room for Simple's arrival, voicing her admiration for him ("Simply Heavenly"). Simple arrives and promises to mend his way of life and to accompany Joyce to church on Sunday. They go for a stroll. Simple returns Joyce to her room and instead of going home goes to Paddy's Bar. He is conversing with his friends when Zarita enters and persuades him to join her for an evening touring the gin mills of New Jersey ("Let Me Take You for a Ride").

Gitfiddle, a guitar-playing blues singer, enters, having broken a string on his guitar, but still determined to play the blues ("Broken Strings").

The next scene finds Simple in a hospital bed, as Zarita's car has "tried to climb the George Washington Bridge instead of crossing it!" The scene shifts back to the bar to find Simple out of the hospital but unable to sit down. He is as disgusted with himself as he is broke; he has spent nearly his last nickel on a newspaper that has no news about people of color ("Flying Saucer Monologue").

Gitfiddle mourns the fact that jukeboxes are taking the place of live music. Mamie, the warmhearted woman everybody loves, assures him he can play the blues for her any time ("Did You Ever Hear the Blues?"). Simple's friends continue to admonish him for his fast living and he recalls the story of John Henry ("I'm Gonna Be John Henry").

Mamie is constantly being pursued by Melon, a watermelon vendor. She expresses disgust at his constantly following her and forever ringing her bell ("When I'm in a Quiet Mood").

Zarita returns, trying to get the bartender Hopkins to join her for a night of fun. She cannot understand his refusal and recalls the times when he would accept ("Look for the Morning Star").

Though Simple has made progress raising money for his divorce, he is now jobless. Joyce tells him she will lend him money and do his laundry ("Gatekeeper of My Castle").

Simple returns to his room, only to be interrupted by Zarita and many of her friends. It is Zarita's birthday ("Let's Ball Awhile"). Simple wants no part of this but can't help himself. Just as the fun is at its peak, Joyce enters to return Simple's laundry. Zarita decides she is unwanted and takes the party to her house.

Next morning, the bar is saddened by Simple's troubles with Joyce. The bartender tries to spread a little cheer ("Beat It Out, Mon"). Zarita cannot understand why her charms are being rebuffed by Simple—she has never had trouble with men before (The Men in My Life).

Meanwhile, Simple gets his job back and decides he will not see Joyce again until he has enough money to pay for his divorce.

== Musical Numbers ==
- "Prelude and Simply Heavenly"
- "Let Me Take You For A Ride"
- "Broken Strings"
- "Flying Saucer Monologue"
- "Did You Ever Hear the Blues?"
- "I'm Gonna be John Henry"
- "When I'm in a Quiet Mood"
- "Look for the Morning Star"
- "Gatekeeper of My Castle"
- "Let's Ball Awhile"
- "Beat it Out, Mon"
- "The Men in My Life"
- "Good Old Girl"
- "Mississippi Monologue and Finale"
