= Whistler, Alabama =

Unincorporated community in Alabama, United States

- Unincorporated community
- Location within Alabama Location within the United States
- Coordinates: 30°45′24″N 088°06′11″W
- Country: United States
- State: Alabama
- County: Mobile
- Elevation: 36 ft (11 m)
- GNIS ID: 128852

Whistler was an unincorporated community in Mobile County, until the 1950s when it was annexed into neighboring Prichard. The founding of Whistler, in the 1850s, coincided with construction of the Mobile and Ohio Railroad. The M & O, an early land grant railroad, eventually extended from Mobile to the Ohio River, and beyond to St. Louis, Missouri, and Chicago, Illinois. The town, seven miles north-northwest of Mobile, developed around the M & O shops. Whistler was named for famous railroad construction engineer and West Point Military graduate George Washington Whistler, who was father of James McNeill Whistler. The younger Whistler was painter of "Arrangement in Grey and Black," better known as "Whistler's Mother."

Currently the US Postal Service ZIP code 36612 is accepted as Whistler. Eight Mile Creek flows along much of the northern side of Whistler, before joining Chickasabogue, a tributary of the Mobile River. During Whistler's heyday, both creeks provided popular swimming holes for cooling off during hot summer months.

U.S. Route 45, the southern terminus of which is in Mobile, passes through Whistler en route to Chicago and on to Lake Superior, in Michigan's upper peninsula. Most modern-day travelers use Interstate 65, which passes on the eastern edge of the town. I-65 goes from Mobile to the shores of Lake Michigan, just east of Chicago at Gary, Indiana.

Whistler was annexed into the City of Prichard in the 1950s, thus the Prichard 36612 ZIP Code. At that time, many historic Whistler street names were changed, due to duplication with Prichard street names or to continue Prichard street names. The annexation of Whistler and neighboring Eight Mile resulted in the highest census population ever for Prichard: 47,371.

== Demographics ==
Historical population
Census	Pop.	Note	%±
1880	1,333		—
U.S. Decennial Census

Whistler appeared on the 1880 U.S. Census with a population of 1,333. This made it the second largest community in Mobile County after Mobile. Although noted on the 1890 U.S. Census, its population was not separately returned. It did not appear on the census again.

== Notable people ==
- Ethel Ayler, actress
- Casey Jones, legendary railroad engineer, was baptized into the Catholic faith at Whistler's St. Bridget Church.
- Ellis Lankster, American football cornerback for the New York Jets of the National Football League
- Billy Williams, former Chicago Cub great and member of the National Baseball Hall of Fame, is a native of Whistler. His nickname was "Sweet Swingin' Billy from Whistler."
