= Arthur French (actor) =

American actor, director (1931–2021)

- Born: Arthur Wellesley French Jr. November 6, 1931; New York City, U.S.
- Died: July 24, 2021 (aged 89); New York City, U.S.
- Occupation(s): Actor, director
- Years active: 1960s–2021
- Spouse: Antoinette Williams
- Children: 2

Arthur Wellesley French Jr. (November 6, 1931 – July 24, 2021) was an American actor and director, best known for his work in the theatre.

== Life and career ==
French was born in Harlem, New York City, on November 6, 1931, the son of Arthur and Ursilla French, who both emigrated to the U.S. from Saint Vincent and the Grenadines.

Throughout a career that spans over fifty years, French is best known for his work on the stage. He worked extensively with the Negro Ensemble Company (NEC) and has played a wide variety of roles. He was also a supporting character in the 1976 comedy film Car Wash.

His later film credits were in 2 Days in New York and Red Hook Summer, both released in August 2012. He died on July 24, 2021, at the age of 89 in Manhattan, New York.

== Selected credits ==
=== Theatre ===
==== Acting ====
Year	Production	Role	Theatre(s)	Notes
1962	Raisin' Hell in the Son		Provincetown Playhouse	
1969	Ceremonies in Dark Old Men	William Jenkins	St. Mark's Playhouse	
1971	Black Girl	Earl	Theatre de Lys	
1971	Ain't Supposed to Die a Natural Death		Ethel Barrymore Theatre	
1978	Nevis Mountain Dew	Ayton Morris	St. Mark's Playhouse	
1981	The Amen Corner	Brother Boxer	Crossroads Theater Company	
1983	You Can't Take It With You	Donald	Plymouth Theatre; Royale Theatre	
1991	Mule Bone	Rev. Singletary; Mayor Joe Clark (understudy)	Ethel Barrymore Theatre	
1995	Henry VI	Earl of Salisbury	Theater at St. Clements Church	
2001	Fire Drill	Carl	Urban Stages	Part of "Free Market," a collection of eight short plays.
2001	Kickin Summit	Ski	Urban Stages	Part of "Free Market," a collection of eight short plays.
2001	Give Us This Day	Dad	Urban Stages	Part of "Free Market," a collection of eight short plays.
2001	The Border Crossers Lounge	Mother Perez	Urban Stages	Part of "Free Market," a collection of eight short plays.
2005	The Master Builder	Doctor Herdal	Pearl Theatre	
2006	Two Trains Running	Holloway	Peter Norton Space	Lucille Lortel Award, Outstanding Featured Actor
2007	Dividing the Estate	Doug	59E59 Theater A	
2009	Medea		The Riverside Theatre	
2009	The Book of Lambert		La MaMa etc.	
2009	Dividing the Estate	Doug	Hartford Stage	

==== Directing ====
Year	Production	Theatre(s)	Notes
1967	One Last Look	Old Reliable Theatre Tavern	One of the first produced plays written by steve carter

=== Film ===
==== Acting ====
Year	Title	Role
1976	Car Wash	Charlie
1986	'Round Midnight	Booker
1992	Malcolm X	Pullman Porter
1994	Crooklyn	West Indian Store Manager
2012	Where is Joel Baum?	Detective Robertson
2013	2 Days in New York	Lee Robinson
2013	Movie 43	Old Man
2014	God's Pocket	Lucien "Old Lucy" Edwards

=== Television ===
==== Acting ====
Year	Title	Role	Notes
1986–1987	Another World	Al Edwards	2 episodes
2018	New Amsterdam	Brent	Season 1, Episode 15
