= Ethel Ayler =

American actress

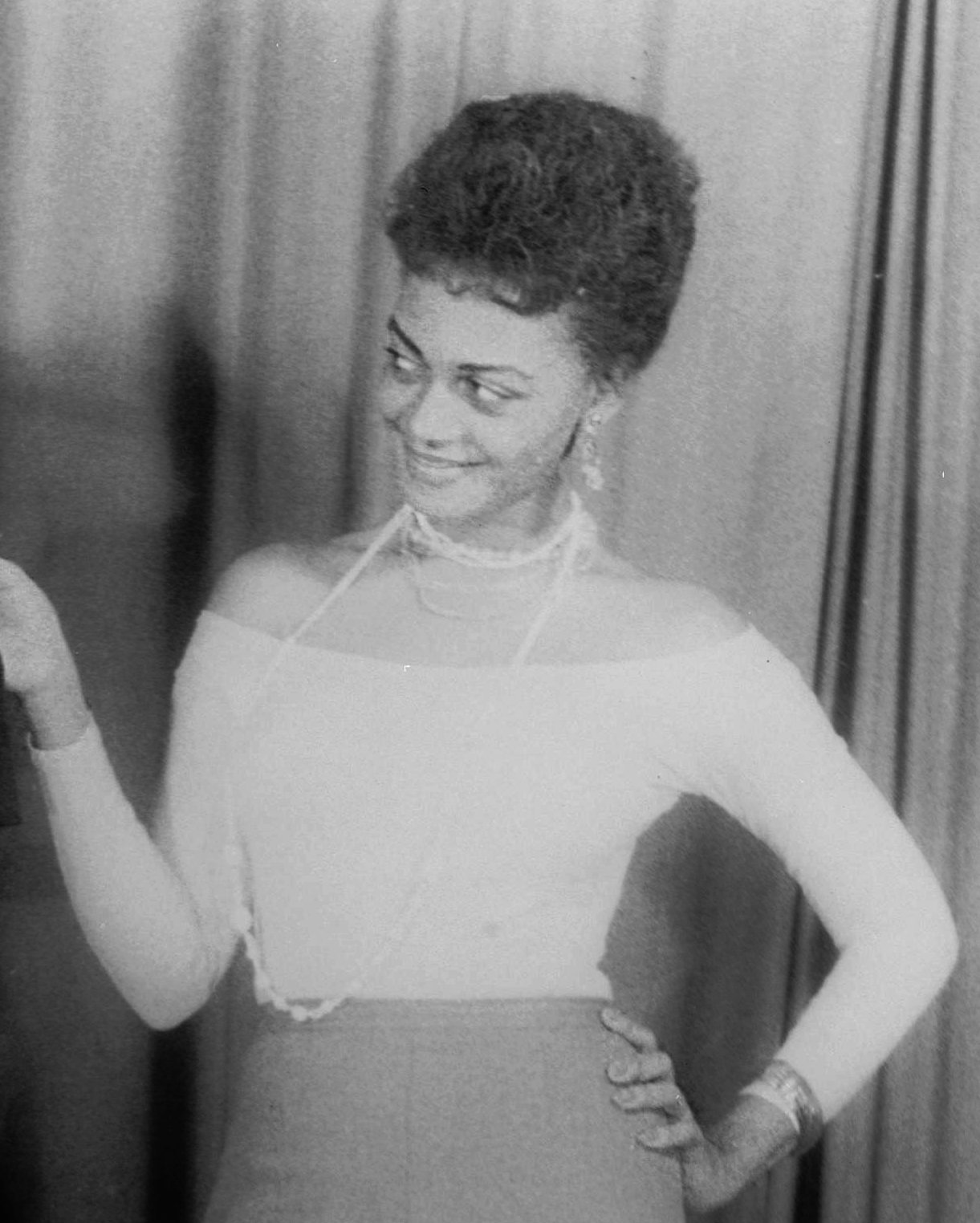
- Ayler in 1957
- Born: Ethyl Spraggins Ayler; May 1, 1930; Whistler, Alabama, U.S.
- Died: November 18, 2018 (age 88); Loma Linda, California, U.S.
- Education: Fisk University
- Occupation: Actress
- Years active: 1957–2018

Ethyl Spraggins Ayler (May 1, 1930 – November 18, 2018) was an American character actress with a career spanning over five decades.

== Biography ==
Ayler was born in Whistler, Alabama and graduated from Fisk University.

In 1957, she made her off-Broadway debut in the Langston Hughes musical, Simply Heavenly. Later that year, she debuted on Broadway in the multiple Tony Award-nominated musical, Jamaica as an understudy for Lena Horne (also making her Broadway debut).

Another notable early performance was in Jean Genet's play, The Blacks: A Clown Show, which ran off-Broadway for 1,408 performances and received three Obie Awards, including Best New Play. The impressive cast of black actors included three future Academy Award nominees: James Earl Jones, Cicely Tyson and Louis Gossett Jr.

Throughout her career, Ayler appeared frequently with the Negro Ensemble Company. This included notable performances in The First Breeze of Summer, Eden and Nevis Mountain Dew.

On television, Ayler had a recurring role as Carrie Hanks, Clair Huxtable's mother on The Cosby Show. She also made memorable performances in the films To Sleep with Anger (1990) and Eve's Bayou (1997).

For her work in To Sleep with Anger, Ayler received a nomination for the Independent Spirit Award for Best Supporting Female.

Ayler's last Broadway appearance was in another Tony-nominated production, The Little Foxes, in 1997. On November 18, 2018, she died in Loma Linda, California, at the age of 88.

== Selected credits ==
=== Theatre ===
Year	Production	Role	Theatre(s)	Notes
1997	The Little Foxes	Addie	Vivian Beaumont Theater	
1987	Fences	Bono; Gabriel; Rose (understudy)	46th Street Theatre	
1983	Sons and Fathers of Sons	Sister 3	Theatre Four	
1981	Weep Not for Me	Lillian Hendricks	Theatre Four	
1978	Nevis Mountain Dew	Zepora Philibert	St. Mark's Playhouse	
1976	Eden	Florie	St. Mark's Playhouse	
1975	The First Breeze of Summer	Hattie	St. Mark's Playhouse	Also appeared in the 1976 Movie of the Week.
1975	Black Picture Show	Rita (understudy)	Vivian Beaumont Theater	
1974	Les Femmes Noires	Mrs. Thompson	The Other Stage	
1961	Kwamina	Naii	54th Street Theatre	
1961	The Blacks: A Clown Show	Augustus Snow	St. Mark's Playhouse	
1960	The Cool World	Woman at the Beach	Eugene O'Neill Theatre	
1957	Jamaica	Island Woman; Islander; Savannah (understudy)	Imperial Theatre	
1957	Simply Heavenly	Zarita	85th Street Playhouse	

=== Film ===
Year	Film	Role	Notes
1997	Eve's Bayou	Gran Mere	
1992	The Bodyguard	Emma	
1990	To Sleep with Anger	Hattie	Independent Spirit Award nomination, Best Supporting Female
1986	9½ Weeks	Jewelry Saleswoman	
1972	Come Back, Charleston Blue	Matron at Ball	
1962	Time of the Heathen	Marie	
