= Gilbert Moses =

American film director (1942–1995)

- Born: Gilbert Moses III; August 20, 1942; Cleveland, Ohio, U.S.
- Died: April 15, 1995 (aged 52); New York City, U.S.
- Occupation: Director
- Years active: 1960–1992
- Spouses: Denise Nicholas (m. 1964; div. 1965) Wilma Butler (div. 1971) Dee Dee Bridgewater (m. 1977; div. 1985)
- Partner: Eda Godel Hallinan
- Children: 2; including China Moses

Gilbert Moses III (August 20, 1942 – April 15, 1995) was an American actor and theatrical director. He was also known for his work in the Civil Rights movement, as a staff member of the Student Non-Violent Coordinating Committee (SNCC) and founder of the touring company, the Free Southern Theater toured the South during the 1960s.

== Early life ==
Moses was born in Cleveland, Ohio, and began acting as a child at Karamu House. He studied at Oberlin College and spent a year at the Sorbonne University in Paris, before leaving college to join the civil rights movement.

== Career ==
Moses was the co-founder of the Free Southern Theater company, an important pioneer of African-American theatre.

His 1971 Broadway debut, Ain't Supposed to Die a Natural Death, won him a Tony Award nomination and the Drama Desk Award for Most Promising Director.

In 1976, he and George Faison teamed to co-direct and choreograph the ill-fated Alan Jay Lerner-Leonard Bernstein musical 1600 Pennsylvania Avenue, which closed after seven performances.

Moses' off-Broadway work as a director won him an Obie Award for Amiri Baraka's Slave Ship (1969) and the New York Drama Critics' Circle Award for The Taking of Miss Janie (1975). In 1986, his friendship with writer Toni Morrison led to his directing the world premiere of her first play Dreaming Emmett at Capital Repertory Theatre in Albany, NY. It remains the only production of the play.

Among Moses' television credits are Benson, Ghostwriter, The Paper Chase, Law & Order, several episodes of the mini-series Roots, and a number of television movies. His only feature films were Willie Dynamite (1974) and The Fish That Saved Pittsburgh (1979).

== Personal life ==
Moses was married three times, to actress Denise Nicholas, Wilma Butler, and singer Dee Dee Bridgewater, and had two daughters, Tsia and China.

== Death ==
Moses died of multiple myeloma on April 15, 1995, in New York City. He was 52 years old.
