= Eden (Steve Carter play) =

- Original language: English
- Written by: Steve Carter
- Series: The Caribbean Trilogy: Eden; Nevis Mountain Dew; Dame Lorraine
- Subject: A recent Caribbean immigrant discovers that his daughter has fallen in love with an uneducated African-American man from the rural South.
- Genre: Drama
- Setting: 1920s; San Juan Hill section of New York City

Premiere
- Date: March 3, 1976
- Place: St. Mark's Playhouse; New York City

Eden is a 1976 play by American playwright Steve Carter. Set in the 1920s, it is the first of Carter's Caribbean trilogy. Eden explores intra-racial conflicts between recent immigrants from the Caribbean and the African-American population. The West Coast premiere of this critically acclaimed play received five Los Angeles Drama Critics Circle Awards.

== Characters ==
Joseph Barton
The main character of the play. A recent Caribbean immigrant to the United States and follower of Marcus Garvey.
Annetta Barton
Joseph's daughter. She falls in love with Eustace Baylor, an African-American from the South, which causes the central conflict within the story.
Eustace Baylor
An African American from the rural South than falls in love with Annette.
Solomon Barton
One of Joseph's sons.
Nimrod Barton
One of Joseph's sons.

== Plot synopsis ==
Set in the San Juan Hill section of New York City in 1927, Joseph Barton, a recent Caribbean immigrant and follower of Marcus Garvey discovers to his horror that his daughter is keeping company with an uneducated African American man from the rural South.

== Origins of the play ==
Eden is loosely based on the story of the playwright's parents. Horace Carter, Sr., a native of Virginia, and his wife, Carmen, who was born in New York of Caribbean descent, lived in New York City at the time of their son's birth.

== Original off-Broadway production ==
- Directed by Edmund Cambridge
- Produced by Negro Ensemble Company (NEC)
- Executive Director: Robert Hooks
- Artistic Director: Douglas Turner Ward
- Managing Director: Frederick Garrett
- Set Designer: Pamela S. Peniston
- Costume Designer: Edna Watson
- Lighting Designer: Sandra L. Ross
- Production Stage Manager: Clinton Turner Davis
- Opened: March 3, 1976 at St. Mark's Playhouse (transferred to Theatre De Lys on May 14, 1976)

=== Cast ===
- Graham Brown - Joseph Barton
- Shirley Brown — Annetta Barton
- Barbara Montgomery - Aunt Lizzie
- Ethel Ayler - Florie
- Samm-Art Williams - Eustace Baylor
- Laurence Fishburne - Solomon Barton
- Nate Farrell — Nimrod Barton
- Ramona King — Agnes

=== Replacements ===
- James Warden, Jr. - Solomon Barton,

== Los Angeles production (West Coast premiere) ==
- Directed by Edmund Cambridge
- Produced by Los Angeles Actors Theatre
- Opened: December 1980 at Los Angeles Actors Theatre

=== Cast ===
- Carl Lumbly - Joseph Barton
- Cheryl Francis - Annetta Barton
- Harold Sylvester - Eustace Baylor
- Marilyn Coleman
- Ralph Carter
- J Marshall Evans
- Larry B. Scott

== Feature film project ==
In 1985, Carter wrote the screenplay A Time Called Eden, based on his play. It was set to go into production the following year, however, to date, the project remains unproduced.

== Awards and nominations ==
=== Awards ===
- 1976 Outer Critics Circle Award
- 1976 Audelco Award
- 1980 Los Angeles Drama Critics Circle Award - Direction (Edmund Cambridge)
- 1980 Los Angeles Drama Critics Circle Award - Lead Performance (Carl Lumbly)
- 1980 Los Angeles Drama Critics Circle Award - Playwrighting (steve carter)
- 1980 Los Angeles Drama Critics Circle Award - Production (Los Angeles Theatre Center)
- 1980 Los Angeles Drama Critics Circle Award - Supporting Performance (Marilyn Coleman)

== Notes ==
In 2008, Barbara Montgomery from the original cast, staged a reading of Eden with the Negro Ensemble Company as part of The NEC Classic Playreading Series.
