= Samm-Art Williams =

American playwright and screenwriter (1946–2024)

- Publicity photo of Samm-Art Williams
- Born: Samuel Arthur Williams; January 20, 1946; Burgaw, North Carolina, U.S.
- Died: May 13, 2024 (aged 78); Burgaw, North Carolina, U.S.
- Occupations: Playwright, screenwriter, television producer
- Writing career
- Period: 1973–2024
- Notable awards: Tony Award nomination and Drama Desk Award nomination for Home

Samuel Arthur Williams (January 20, 1946 – May 13, 2024) was an American playwright, screenwriter, and television producer.

Williams was nominated for a Tony Award and a Drama Desk Award for his play Home (1979), which moved from the Negro Ensemble Company to a Broadway production in 1980. In the mid-1980s, he received two Emmy nominations for his work for television series. The Black Rep of St. Louis, Missouri, produced the premiere of his play The Montford Point Marine (2011).

== Biography ==
=== Early life and career ===
Williams was born on January 20, 1946, in Burgaw, North Carolina, the son of Samuel and Valdosia Williams. His mother was a high-school English and drama teacher. Williams attended segregated public schools through high school He grew up in Burgaw under the care of his mother. Williams credited her with his interest in and love of words. He said that his mother "made me read everything from Langston Hughes to Edgar Allan Poe.... I think The Raven was my greatest influence—in seeing this bird, I saw what a great thing it was to be able to work on a person's mind with words." Williams graduated from Morgan State University in Baltimore, Maryland, where he studied political science and psychology. At one point, he considered becoming a lawyer, but his dream of being a playwright won out.

After college, Williams moved to Philadelphia, where he collaborated with the New Freedom Theatre as an actor, worked as a salesman to pay his bills, and wrote in his free time. Eventually, he moved to New York City to focus on his writing, though he knew he would also have to continue acting for income.

As Samm Williams, he entered New York City theater as an actor in 1973, performing in the play Black Jesus. With New York's Negro Ensemble Company (NEC), Williams appeared in such plays as Nowhere to Run, Nowhere to Hide (St. Mark's Playhouse, 1974) and Liberty Calland (St. Mark's Playhouse, 1975), before taking on the name Samm-Art Williams for Argus and Klansman and Waiting for Mongo (St. Mark's Playhouse, 1975).

Williams, a 6 ft 8 in (2.03 m) lefty, was once a sparring partner of boxer Muhammad Ali. Williams was recruited to work with Ali, who was afraid of lefties.

Other early New York acting experience includes understudy work in Leslie Lee's Tony Award-nominated Broadway play The First Breeze of Summer (Palace Theatre, June 7 – July 19, 1975); Eden (St. Mark's Playhouse, 1976), The Brownsville Raid (Theatre de Lys, 1976–77), Night Shift (Playhouse Theatre, 1977), and Black Body Blues (St. Mark's Playhouse, 1978). His early work in regional theater includes Nevis Mountain Dew at the Arena Stage in Washington, D.C. (1979).

Williams made his screen debut playing "Roger" in the Richard Price novel adaptation The Wanderers (1979), and played a subway police officer in director Brian De Palma's Dressed to Kill (1980). An earlier film, the independent blaxploitation feature The Baron, a.k.a. Baron Wolfgang von Tripps and Black Cue, made circa 1977, was released direct-to-video by Paragon Video in 1996.

As Samm Williams, he wrote the play Welcome to Black River, produced by the Negro Ensemble Company (NEC) at St. Mark's Playhouse in 1975; and as Samm-Art Williams, The Coming and Do Unto Others, both at the Billie Holiday Theatre in Brooklyn in 1976; A Love Play produced by the NEC that same year; The Last Caravan (1977); and Brass Birds Don't Sing, at New York City's Stage 73 in 1978.

Williams participated in the NEC Playwrights Workshop under the guidance of playwright-in-residence Steve Carter, who strongly influenced his work. About Carter, Williams said "that no single individual has influenced my writing to the degree that Steve Carter has."

=== Home ===
Williams' comedy Home was mounted by the Negro Ensemble Company at St. Mark's Playhouse from 1979 to 1980, moving to Broadway's Cort Theatre from May 7, 1980, to January 4, 1981. The play earned nominations for both the Tony Award and the Drama Desk Award.

=== 1980s ===
Williams went on to play Matthew Henson in the historical drama TV movie Cook and Peary: The Race to the Pole (CBS, 1983). He starred in the PBS American Playhouse dramas Denmark Vesey (1985; title role) and The Adventures of Huckleberry Finn (as Jim; 1986). In the mid-1980s he appeared in television series including The New Mike Hammer, 227, and Frank's Place, a CBS dramedy for which he also served as a story editor. His film work during this time included a role — the fourth lead — in Blood Simple (1984).

Williams wrote the PBS productions Kneeslappers (1980) and Experiment in Freedom (American Playhouse, 1985); episodes for the series Cagney and Lacey, The New Mike Hammer, Miami Vice, and The Fresh Prince of Bel Air; the "John Henry" episode of the Showtime cable network series Shelley Duvall's Tall Tales & Legends; and the NBC special Motown Returns to the Apollo (1986), among other work. He wrote a CBS series pilot titled Lenny's Neighborhood.

=== 1990s–2020s ===
Williams wrote and directed the comedy The Dance on Widows' Row, produced by the New Federal Theatre at Manhattan's Harry De Jur Playhouse at Henry Street Settlement from June 25 to July 30, 2000.

In 2006, Williams held auditions for his play The Waiting Room, to be performed that spring at the Raleigh Little Theatre's Gaddy-Goodwin Teaching Theatre in Raleigh, North Carolina.

In 2011, The Black Rep of St. Louis, Missouri, produced the world premiere of his play The Montford Point Marine, starring J. Samuel Davis. Montford Point was where the first black Marines trained.

Williams was Artist-in-Residence at North Carolina Central University, where he taught classes on equity theater and the art of playwriting. His producing for television also included story-editing and script-writing for the CBS television series Frank's Place in 1987–88, ABC-TV's Hangin' with Mr. Cooper, NBC-TV's The Fresh Prince of Bel-Air, the short-lived UPN sitcom series Good News and the Fox TV sitcom series Martin.

Williams died in Burgaw on May 13, 2024, at the age of 78.

== Awards and honors ==
- 1980: Tony Award Nomination – Best Play: Home, written by Samm-Art Williams
- 1980: Drama Desk Award Nomination – Outstanding New Play: Home, written by Samm-Art Williams
- 1985: Emmy Award Nomination – Outstanding Writing in a Variety or Music Program, for Motown Returns to the Apollo (shared with fellow writers Buz Kohan and Peter Elbling)
- 1988: Emmy Award Nomination – Outstanding Comedy Series, Frank's Place (as story editor; shared with executive producers Hugh Wilson and Tim Reid, producers Max Tash and David Chambers and co-producer Richard Dubin)
- Fellowships from the Guggenheim Foundation and the National Endowment for the Arts
- 2010: NC Literary Hall of Fame Induction
