= Steve Carter (playwright) =

American playwright (1929–2020)

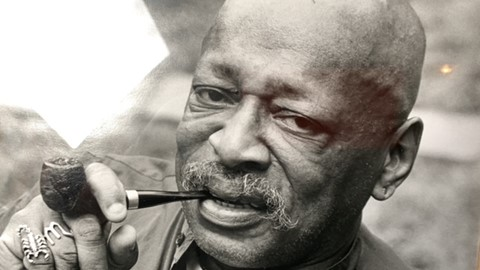
- Born: Horace Edward Carter Jr. November 7, 1929; Manhattan, New York City, US
- Died: September 15, 2020 (aged 90); Tomball, Texas, US
- Occupations: Playwright, screenwriter
- Writing career
- Period: 1965–2020
- Notable awards: Los Angeles Drama Critics Circle Award (1980)

Horace Edward "Steve" Carter Jr. (November 7, 1929 – September 15, 2020) was an American playwright, best known for his plays involving Caribbean immigrants living in the United States.

== Biography ==
Born Horace Edward Carter Jr. in New York City to Horace Sr., an African-American longshoreman from Richmond, Virginia, and Carmen, who was from Trinidad, he is professionally known as steve carter (spelled in all lowercase letters).

Carter's first interest in the theatre was to be a set designer. As a youngster, he would make models of sets inspired by motion pictures and the occasional play he would see with his mother. Soon he would populate these models with cutout figures. This led to him creating dialog for the figures as he moved them around the set.

In 1948, he graduated from the High School of Music and Art in New York City.

His professional career as a playwright began in 1965 at the American Community Theater with the production of the short play Terraced Apartment. This work would evolve years later into an expanded version entitled Terraces.

On November 13, 1967, One Last Look premiered off-off-Broadway at the Old Reliable Theatre Tavern under the direction of Arthur French. It is a dark comedy set during the funeral of a family patriarch. It features the character of Eustace Baylor that would later be found in Eden, the first of Carter's trilogy of plays featuring Caribbean families in New York City.

In 1968, he joined the staff of the Negro Ensemble Company (NEC), where he would become director of the NEC Playwrights Workshop. One of his best known students was Samm-Art Williams, who once said "that no single individual has influenced my writing to the degree that Steve Carter has."

While Carter was at NEC, several of his plays were produced, including the first two of his Caribbean trilogy.

== The Caribbean trilogy ==
All three plays in the series deal with Caribbean immigrant families living in New York City at various periods during the 20th century. While each family is different, each play features a patriarch that has become incapacitated in one way or another. The plays in the trilogy are as follows:

=== Eden ===
Set in the San Juan Hill section of New York City in the late 1920s, Eden tells a story somewhat reminiscent of Romeo and Juliet about a young Caribbean woman who falls in love with a black man from the rural American South. Her strict father does not approve of the relationship, because he feels that American blacks, especially those from the rural South, are vastly inferior to Caribbean blacks. The play was produced by NEC in 1976, then transferred to Theatre de Lys to continue its run for a total of 181 performances. The production garnered Carter recognition from the Outer Critics Circle as the season's most promising new playwright. In 1986, his feature film adaptation, A Time Called Eden, was set to go into production, but has yet to be produced.

=== Nevis Mountain Dew ===
Nevis Mountain Dew, the second play in the series, deals with the effects of the patriarch being crippled by paralysis in the Queens section of New York City in the 1950s. Like Whose Life Is It Anyway?, it deals with euthanasia. Both were among the ten productions selected by the Burns Mantle Yearbook as "The Best Plays of 1978–1979."

=== Dame Lorraine ===
In 1981, Carter left NEC to become the first playwright-in-residence at the Victory Gardens Theater in Chicago. His first play produced there was Dame Lorraine, the final play of his Caribbean trilogy. Set in modern times, the play tells the story of an elderly couple living in Harlem that anxiously await the return of their last surviving son who has just been released from prison.

== Later works ==
Other plays produced at the Victory Gardens Theater include House of Shadows, Pecong and the musical, Shoot Me While I'm Happy. Spiele '36: Or the Fourth Medal had its world premiere at Theater of the First Amendment at George Mason University in 1991.

Carter later lived in Houston, Texas, and died aged 90 on September 15, 2020, in Tomball, Texas.

== Awards and nominations ==
- 1977: Outer Critics Circle Award (Most Promising New Playwright) for Eden
- 1979: Selection, Burns Mantle, The Best Plays of 1978–1979 for Nevis Mountain Dew
- 1979: Drama Desk Award (Outstanding New Play) nomination for Nevis Mountain Dew
- 1980: Los Angeles Drama Critics Circle Award (Playwriting) for Eden
- 1990: Jeff Award (Best New Work) for Pecong
- 2001: National Black Theatre Festival – Living Legend Award

Carter has also received recognition from the National Endowment for the Arts, the Rockefeller Foundation, the Guggenheim Foundation and the New York State Council on the Arts.
