= Dianne Kirksey =

American filmmaker (1950–2020)

- Born: 1950
- Died: September 1, 2020 (aged 69–70)
- Education: Double major in Theater and English, University of Alabama, 1973; Intensive Filmmaking Program, New York University
- Occupations: Filmmaker, writer, producer, acitivist, educator, actress

Dianne Kirksey (also known as Dianne Kirksey-Floyd) (1950 – September 1 2020) was an African-American filmmaker, writer, producer, activist, educator, and actress. Her theatrical productions were nominated for a combined 16 Audelco Awards. Kirksey received the honorary rank of Lieutenant Colonel in the Alabama State Militia in 1985 for her leadership and service to the state.

== Early life and education ==
Dianne Kirksey was born in Eutaw, Alabama, United States, to Wiley Kirksey, a former school superintendent in Greene County, Alabama and Gladys Kirksey, an educator. Kirksey was active in several local plays and productions as a child.

As a student leader during the Civil Rights Movement, she led marches and protests through Greene County in support of the Voters' Rights Act. She graduated Carver High School in 1967.

Kirksey matriculated at the University of Alabama in the fall of 1967. As a freshman, she was the first Black student named "Bama Belle" and first Black member of the homecoming court. She was a founding member of the UA African American Association (renamed the Black Student Union), the first Black woman to be an officer of the Associated Women's Students organization, and led the Institutional Racism Workshop at the UA International Women's Conference. She graduated with a double major in Theater and English in 1973.

Since her graduation, she has been honored by the university for contributions to racial and gender equality, and listed as one of the most important black alumni by AL.com. In 2018, she was one of twenty Female Trailblazers celebrated at the UA 1893 Jubilee Dinner celebrating 125 years of women admitted to the University.

Kirksey studied at the New York University Intensive Filmmaking Program under Thierry Pathe.

== Career ==
She taught third and fifth grades at PS 334 from 2006 - 2019.

In 2017, she released two short films, Sweet Dreams, Momma and Bama's Black Babies Are Dying, and was developing a series of TV and film projects.

Her notable acting roles include portraying Cheryl in Ron Milner's Urban Transitions: Loose Blossoms opposite Chadwick Boseman, produced by Woodie King, Jr. Kirksey also earned roles in film and television, including The Doctors, One Life to Live, Rich Kids (directed by Robert M. Young), and The Marva Collins Story, which starred Morgan Freeman and Cicely Tyson.

Kirksey also served two terms on New York City's Community Board 8 on the Education Committee.

== Death ==
Kirksey died in New York on September 1, 2020.

=== Film and television ===
Production	Role	Year
Sweet Dreams, Momma‡	Producer, Director, Writer	2017
Bama's Black Babies Are Dying†	Producer, Director	2017
Rain Without Thunder	Mother	1992
Soiree de Deux	Director, Writer	1987
The Doctors	Bobbie DuVall	1980-81, 33 episodes
The Marva Collins Story	Cynthia Rawls	1981
Rich Kids	Ralph's Secretary	1979
Watch Your Mouth	Doris	1978

† Pre-production ‡ Post-production

=== Theatre ===
==== Actress ====
Play	Theater	Year
Power Play	Billie Holiday Theater	2005
Urban Transitions: Loose Blossoms	New Federal Theater	2002
The World of Ben Caldwell	New Federal Theater	1982
Games	New Federal Theater	1982
The Incarnation of Reverend Goode Blacque Dress	New Federal Theater	1982
So Nice They Named It Twice	New York Shakespeare Festival	1977
What the Winesellers Buy	New York Shakespeare Festival	1975

==== Director ====
Play	Theater	Year
Why Old Ladies Cry at Weddings	Frank Silvera Writers Workshop	1994
Island Memories	Ubu Repertory Theater	1991
In a Dry and Thirsty Land	Riverside Church Theater	1986
The Trial of Adam Clayton Powell	New Federal Theater	1983

== Awards ==
- Trailblazer, University of Alabama 1893 Jubilee Dinner, 2018
- Finalist, New York Television Festival Pitch Competition, 2017
- Honoree, Blackboard Awards, 2011
- Opening Doors, University of Alabama, 2003
- Fellow, Korea Institute, 2002
- Fellow, China Institute, 2001
- Invitee, Cannes Film Festival, 1987
- Honorary Lieutenant Colonel, Alabama State Militia, 1985
