= The Best of TV Quiz & Game Show Themes =

The Best Of TV Quiz & Game Show Themes

Compilation album by various artists
- Released: 2000
- Genre: Television themes
- Label: Varèse Sarabande/Universal Records

The Best of TV Quiz & Game Show Themes was the 2000 follow-up to the bestselling Classic TV Game Show Themes CD, released by Varèse Sarabande. Like the original, the CD contained 20 tracks.

== Track listing ==
1. Match Game - "A Swingin' Safari" - Bert Kaempfert (3:06)
2. Password - "You Know the Password" - Bob Cobert (2:10)
3. To Tell the Truth - Bob Cobert (2:10)
4. Beat the Clock - "Subway Polka" - Harry Geller and his Orchestra (2:37)
5. The Price Is Right - "Window Shopping" - Bob Cobert (1:41)
6. What's My Line? - Score Productions (2:02)
7. Hollywood Squares - "Merrill's and Bob's Theme" - William Loose (2:48)
8. The Joker's Wild - "The Savers" - Gershon Kingsley & Jean-Jacques Perrey (1:43)
9. Monopoly - Mort Lindsey (2:03)
10. Let's Make a Deal - "On With the Show" - Sheldon Allman & Marilyn Hall (1:31)
11. Wheel of Fortune - "Big Wheels" - Alan Thicke (2:17)
12. Tattletales (Closing theme) - "Tell Those Tales" - Score Productions (2:50)
13. Blockbusters - "California Gold Rush" - Bob Cobert (2:22)
14. Break the Bank - "Hustle The Bank" - Stuart Zachary Levin (2:45)
15. The Gong Show - "Hitting the Gong" - Chuck Barris (1:35)
16. The Diamond Head Game - "Diamond Head" - Alan Thicke (2:01)
17. The $10,000 Pyramid - "Tuning Up" - Ken Aldin (3:03)
18. High Rollers - "Bubble Gum" - Bob Israel (1:25)
19. Split Second - "Get Wacky" - Stan Worth (2:15)
20. Rock & Roll Jeopardy! (also used occasionally for the List of Jeopardy! tournaments and events) - Steve Kaplan & Douglas Mackaskill (2:15)

== See also ==
- Classic TV Game Show Themes
