= Black Drama Anthology =

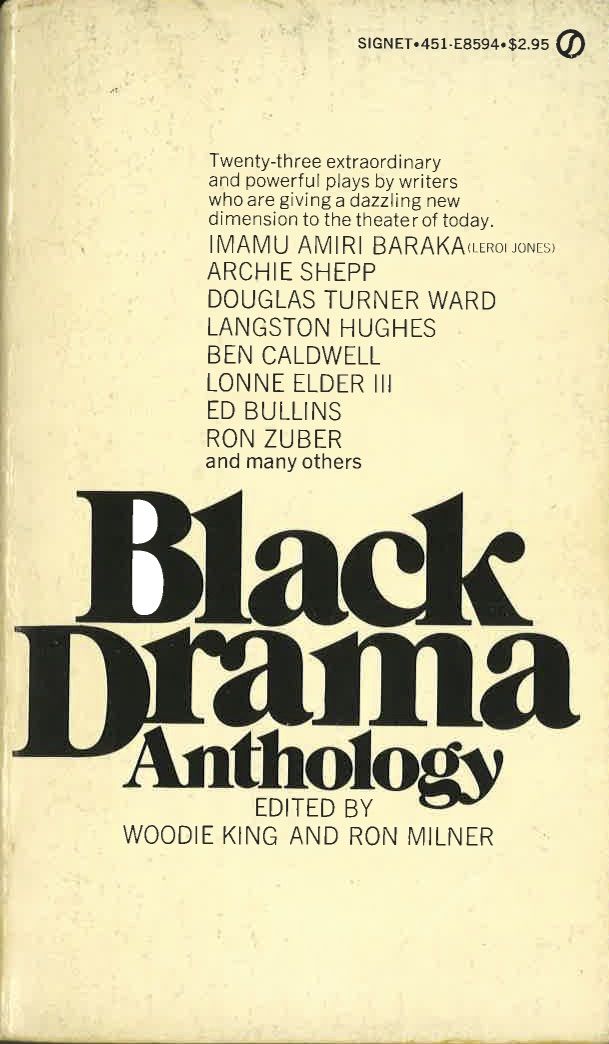
- Book Cover
- Author: Woodie King Jr. and Ron Milner
- Genre: African-American Drama
- Published: 1971
- Publication place: United States
- ISBN: 0451048520

Black Drama Anthology is a 1971 collection of plays solely written by Black American playwrights. The anthology was edited by Woodie King Jr, a Black American stage producer and Ron Milner, a Black American playwright. Writer Langston Hughes, Jazz musician Archie Shepp and writer Imamu Amiri Baraka appear in this collection, among others. Black Drama Anthology opens with a foreword by the editors King and Milner which outlines the motivations behind this collection, in which they write, "...recognizing all of this, and understanding that if we blacks are to have a theater in our own image, according to our own views, then we blacks will have to say which plays are in those images and of those views, we have here compiled an anthology of works by twenty-two of the best black playwrights...Twenty-three selections from an immensely rich field of talented black artists forging new, unique, and viable theater."

== Themes ==
This collection explores an array of themes connected to Black American life. Many of the included works contain elements of social criticism and messages of anti-racism. All but one were written in the early 1970s a "a socially and politically dynamic moment in the nation's history and a renaissance decade for black theater."

== Works Included in Anthology ==
- Junkies are Full of (Shhh….) by Imamu Amiri Baraka
- Bloodrites by Imamu Amiri Baraka
- Junebug Graduates Tonight by Archie Shepp
- The Corner by Ed Bullins
- Who’s Got His Own by Ron Milner
- Charades on East Fourth Street by Lonne Elder
- Gabriel by Clifford Mason
- Brotherhood by Douglas Turner Ward
- The One by Oliver Pitcher
- The Marriage by Donald Greaves
- The Owl Killer by Philip Hayes Dean
- Requiem for Brother X by William Wellington Mackey
- Ododo by Joseph A. Walker
- All White Caste by Ben Caldwell
- Mother and Child by Langston Hughes
- The Breakout by Charles (Oyamo) Gordon
- Three X Love by Ron Zuber
- A Medal for Willie by William Branch
- Ladies in Waiting by Peter DeAnda
- Black Cycle by Martie Charles
- Strictly Matrimony by Errol Hill
- Star of the Morning by Loften Mitchell
- Toe Jam by Elaine Jackson

== Reception ==
The collection was met with mixed reviews, primarily in the realm of critical scholarship.
