= The Doctors (1963 TV series) =

American soap opera series

- Genre: Soap opera; Anthology series
- Created by: Orin Tovrov
- Starring: James Pritchett; Elizabeth Hubbard; Lydia Bruce; David O'Brien; Carolee Campbell; Gerald Gordon
- Theme music composer: Bob Israel at Score Productions
- Country of origin: United States
- Original language: English
- No. of seasons: 20
- No. of episodes: 5,155

Production
- Running time: 30 minutes
- Production company: Colgate

Original release
- Network: NBC
- Release: April 1, 1963 – December 31, 1982

The Doctors is an American daytime soap opera television series which aired on NBC from April 1, 1963, to December 31, 1982.

== From anthology to serial ==
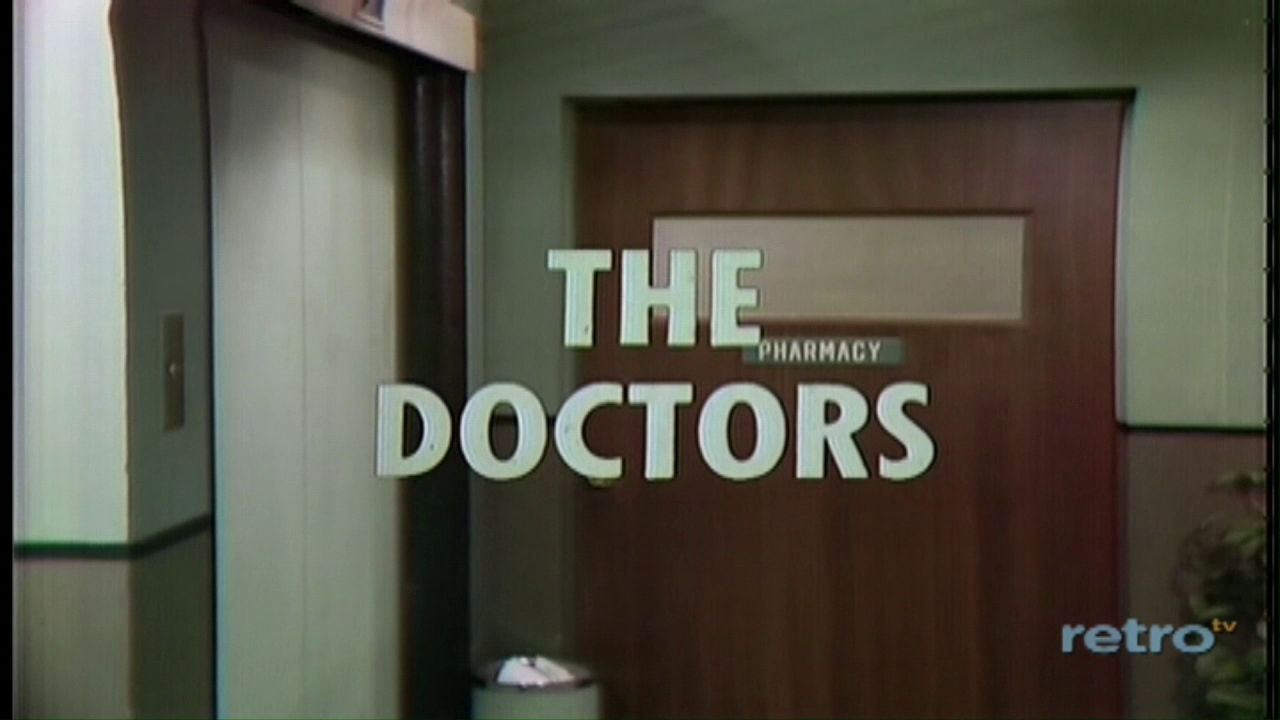
1971 title card

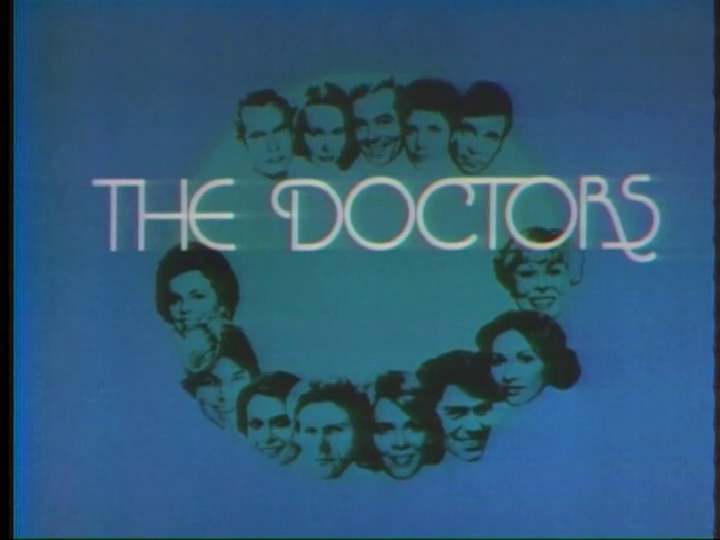
1977 title card

The Doctors debuted on April 1, 1963, using an anthology format with different characters in each story; this was in contrast to all of the other daytime dramas on air at the time. The viewership numbers were not encouraging, however: in that first season, The Doctors pulled only a 3.4 rating, next-to-worst among network TV soaps. Beginning on March 2, 1964, however, the Doctors became a traditional continuing serial, more than doubling the ratings to 7.5 mark.

For most of the series, storylines revolved around Hope Memorial Hospital and its patriarch, chief of staff Dr. Matt Powers (played by James Pritchett), who started on the program on July 9, 1963, although Pritchett originally appeared on the series during its weekly anthology period, in another role.

The cast for the original daily concept, which lasted from the premiere on April 1, 1963, until July 19, 1963, was:

- Jock Gaynor as Dr. William Scott (April 1, 1963 – July 19, 1963, premiere cast)
- Richard Roat as Dr. Jerry Chandler (April 1, 1963 – January 17, 1964, premiere cast)
- Margot Moser as Dr. Elizabeth Hayes (April 1, 1963 – July 19, 1963, premiere cast)
- Fred J. Scollay as Rev. Sam Shafer (April 1, 1963 – 1966, premiere cast)

The early cast for the second, weekly concept, which lasted from July 22, 1963, until February 28, 1964, was:

- Richard Roat as Dr. Jerry Chandler (April 1, 1963 – January 17, 1964, premiere cast)
- Fred J. Scollay as Rev. Sam Shafer (April 1, 1963 – 1966, premiere cast)
- James Pritchett as Dr. Matt Powers (July 22, 1963 – December 31, 1982)
- Rex Thompson as Michael Powers (July 22, 1963 – 1966)
- Ann Williams as Dr. Maggie Fielding (July 22, 1963 – May 25, 1965)
- Joseph Campanella as Alec Fielding (August 19–23, 1963)
- Ruth McDevitt as Mrs. McMurtrie (Rev. Shafer's housekeeper) (September 16, 1963 - July 9, 1964)
- Charles Braswell as Alec Fielding (January 20 – February 11, 1964)
- Scott Graham as Dr. Johnny McGill (January 20, 1964 – December 1964)
- Joan Anderson as Nora Hansen Lloyd (March 9, 1964 – 1966)

== Storylines ==
In the program's early years, The Doctors was considered to be more bold in storyline choices than its primary rival at the time, General Hospital (which premiered on the same day, with a similar premise to TD). While the doctors on General Hospital worked in harmony with one another for the most part and in some cases were intimate friends, the physicians on The Doctors were shown in stories that balanced personal and professional concerns. Some doctors were depicted as competitive and cutthroat. The Doctors incorporated humor and realism into its storylines, and remained anchored to actual medical work in its setting.

For example, when Matt Powers was on trial for murder, he was forced to rescind his chief of staff position. His successor schemed to remove his allies, such as Dr. Althea Davis, from positions of influence in the hospital. Althea's stories included her challenges as a female doctor working with a mainly male staff; one story outlined how Althea's divorce was discussed by the board as a moral issue in a way that no male doctor's personal life had ever been discussed.

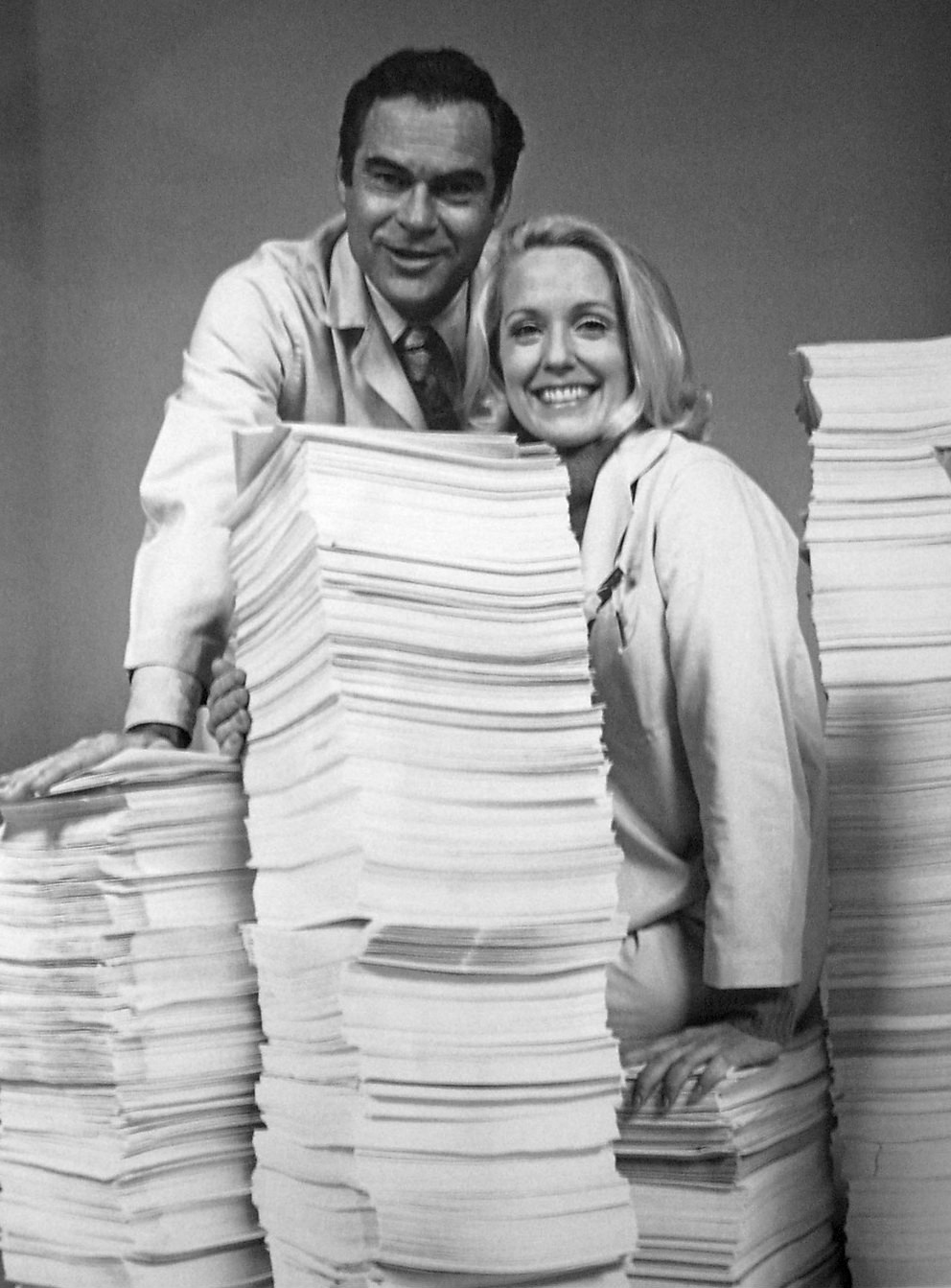
James Pritchett (Matt Powers) and Elizabeth Hubbard (Althea Davis) with ten years worth of scripts on the show's tenth anniversary April 1st 1973

== Awards and production ==
In 1972 and 1974, the serial received a Daytime Emmy Award for Best Drama. During that period until a new opening sequence was created in 1977, announcer Mel Brandt (who was also known for his announcing the animated "Laramie Peacock" color opening in the 1960s and 1970s) would inform the audience at the beginning of each episode: "And now, The Doctors, (The Emmy-Award winning program) dedicated to the brotherhood of healing."

The iconic theme song "Patterns", which was updated with a new version in 1977 and 1979, stayed with the program through August 1, 1980 and was composed by in-house musician Bob Israel at Score Productions. It debuted with the episode which aired on May 24, 1971.

Episodes of The Doctors were originally taped in black and white at Studio 3B, one of NBC's production studios at 30 Rockefeller Center in New York City. It was the last NBC daytime serial to transition from black and white to color on October 17, 1966.

== Broadcast history ==
=== Original series run ===
From the late 1960s until the mid-1970s, The Doctors ranked as one of the top five daytime dramas in the United States. It peaked at fourth place in the 1973–1974 television season, behind CBS' As the World Turns and fellow NBC serials Days of Our Lives and Another World. However, within a period of three years, The Doctors plummeted from fourth to eleventh in the ratings. The decline in ratings was partly attributed to two serials with which The Doctors shared its timeslot: ABC's One Life to Live and CBS's Guiding Light, which expanded to an hour in consecutive years; Guiding Light made this move in 1977, while One Life to Live along with fellow ABC soap General Hospital expanded in 1978.

As the 1978–79 season began, the entire NBC soap opera lineup was suffering in the ratings. While The Doctors was not alone in this, the network began a series of relocations involving the veteran serial that year, which would amplify the series' ratings trouble and eventually lead to its demise. The first move was done to help further increase the ratings of Another World, which had tied for the #1 spot in daytime the previous season. In an unprecedented (and since unrepeated) move, NBC decided to extend Another World and make it the first serial to run for 90 minutes daily. The Doctors, as part of the schedule shuffle that ensued, was moved to 2:00/1:00p, which placed it against the second half of As the World Turns on CBS and the first half of One Life to Live on ABC. The ratings declined slightly, but NBC was not done.

Procter & Gamble Productions (PGP), the producers of Another World, began development on a new serial in 1980 that would evolve into a spin-off of that serial set in Houston. The new program, Texas, was picked up by NBC who envisioned it as a daytime version of CBS' hit primetime drama Dallas. NBC needed to free up one hour of its schedule for Texas, and did so by cutting the runtimes of Another World (which reverted to its previous 60-minute slot) and The David Letterman Show by 30 minutes each. Launching on August 4, 1980, Texas was placed in the 3:00/2:00 p.m. hour with Another World, which had dropped to ninth in the ratings, moving to 2:00/1:00 to serve as its lead-in.

The cutting of Letterman resulted in a movement across the earlier portions of the daytime schedule as well, with Wheel of Fortune moved to 11:00/10:00 a.m. and Password Plus to 11:30/10:30 to follow it. The Doctors, which needed to move to accommodate Another World, thus took the place of Password Plus in the 12:30 p.m./11:30 a.m. slot following Card Sharks. The noon hour would often see affiliates of the three major networks opt not to air their offerings for at least part of, if not all of, the timeslot and usually air a local newscast or some other programming, and The Doctors disappeared from some markets when it made the move. In addition, the 12:30 timeslot was a competitive one for the three networks. ABC's competition came from Ryan's Hope, which had been beating The Doctors by nearly a full ratings point in the overall rankings. The serial's competition on CBS originally consisted of the long-running Search for Tomorrow, which was also pulling in significantly higher ratings than The Doctors had been. In June 1981, CBS moved The Young and the Restless to 12:30 and the ratings faded even further. The Doctors fell to a 3.8 rating at the end of the 1980–81 season, which was tied for last place with Texas.

NBC had not completed its reshuffling of the daytime lineup, though, and a Procter & Gamble serial was again at the forefront for the latest shift. In addition to the aforementioned Another World and Texas, PGP was the production company for Search for Tomorrow. When The Young and the Restless was moved, it took over the timeslot that had been home to Search for Tomorrow since its 1951 premiere. PGP was not willing to renew its contract with CBS to continue carrying the serial unless the network was willing to move it back to its original time; as things stood, Search for Tomorrow was airing at 2:30/1:30, which placed it against the second half of its fellow PGP production Another World.

NBC, however, was willing to do what CBS would not and began negotiating with PGP to move the long-running serial to its daytime lineup. NBC agreed to return Search to 12:30 p.m./11:30 a.m., which it did upon moving to the network on March 29, 1982. Once again, this required a shuffling of the schedule; Password Plus, which had been moved back to the Noon/11:00 slot following the cancellation of Card Sharks in 1981, was cancelled itself to make room on the schedule for Search and The Doctors was moved ahead thirty minutes to open up the timeslot.

Both moves did not help matters, as NBC's serial lineup as a whole had been struggling for some time. The Doctors continued to be the lowest rated of the group, and the move to noon exacerbated the issue. The only serial ahead of it in the ratings was its new stablemate, which saw viewership drop by half after its move from CBS. NBC tried to remedy the situation by cancelling two more of its game shows, Battlestars and Blockbusters, and using that sixty minutes to relocate Texas, which had not found an audience, to 11:00/10:00 a.m. on April 26, 1982, so it could serve as the lead in for the two veteran serials airing in the noon hour. The move did not work as all three serials finished with lower ratings; The Doctors saw its ratings cut even more, eventually falling below a 2.0.

NBC announced the cancellation of The Doctors (along with that of Texas) during the fall of 1982, and the last episode aired on December 31, 1982. The show once again finished in last place as part of the still-struggling NBC daytime lineup, which failed to see one of its serials finish in the top five in the final Nielsens for a fifth consecutive season. The ratings for The Doctors bottomed out at 1.6, less than half of what they were the year before and nearly one-fourth of what they were three years earlier. The final number broke a record set by the short-lived ABC soap The Best of Everything, which pulled a 1.8 rating at the conclusion of its only season in 1970; only Sunset Beach (1997–1999) and Passions (1999–2007), two later NBC serials, finished a season with a lower final rating.

The ninety minutes freed up by the cancellations of The Doctors and Texas were filled by game shows beginning the following Monday. The Doctors saw its place taken by Just Men!, which was cancelled after thirteen weeks. The noon timeslot would not receive a stable show until Super Password premiered in September 1984, which ran until March 1989.

== Reruns ==
In July 2014, Retro TV announced that it would begin broadcasting reruns of The Doctors in the latter half of the year, starting with episodes from December 1967.

On September 29, 2014, the network began airing two episodes of The Doctors each weekday, starting at 12 p.m. (ET)/11 a.m. (CT).

Retro TV started off their reruns of The Doctors in September 2014 with the episode which originally aired December 4, 1967, and stopped its run of episodes with the December 31, 1979 episode on April 23, 2020, at which point syndication on Retro TV restarted with the December 4, 1967 episode on April 27.

Episodes from December 1967 to September 1980 are available to watch on demand for free at Retro TV's It's Real Good TV site. The October 1980-December 1982 episodes were not provided to them and may no longer exist because NBC erased and reused the tapes holding them.

The Doctors has been distributed by SFM Entertainment, which has 4,865 episodes available for syndication, only 290 episodes short of the entire run.

As of July 2018, Retro was running the series seven days a week, but from three different periods of time, with Monday through Friday with one time frame, and then Saturday and Sunday each with two additional respective time frames in the series.

== Cast ==
Core characters during the series' run included:

- James Pritchett as Dr. Matt Powers (1963–1982)
- Ann Williams (1963–1965), Bethel Leslie (1965–1968), Kathleen Murray (March 1968), and Lydia Bruce (1968–1982) as Dr. Maggie Hansen Powers
- Gerald Gordon as neurosurgeon Dr. Nick Bellini (1966–1975, 1976)
- David O'Brien as Dr. Steve Aldrich (1967–1982)
- Carolee Campbell (1967–1976), and Jada Rowland (1976–1982) as Carolee Simpson Aldrich, R. N.
- Elizabeth Hubbard (1964–1969; 1970–1977; 1981–1982) and Virginia Vestoff (1969–1970) as Dr. Althea Davis
- Glenn Corbett as Jason Aldrich (1976–1978; 1979; 1980–1981) // Chris Bohn as Jason Aldrich (1971)

Many well-known actors and actresses had roles on The Doctors throughout its long run, including:

- Marc Alaimo as Frank Barton (1971-1972)
- Jane Badler as Natalie Bell Dancy (1981–1982)
- Alec Baldwin as Billy Aldrich #5 (1980–1982)
- Nancy Barrett as Nurse Kathy Ryker #2 (1971–1972)
- Kathy Bates as Phyllis (dayplayer, 1978)
- Doris Belack as Dr. Claudia Howard (1980)
- Peter Burnell (1968–1973), Armand Assante (1975-1976), as Dr. Mike Powers,
- Ellen Burstyn as Dr. Kate Bartok (1964–65).
- Chris Calloway as Ivie Gooding (1982)
- Shawn Campbell as Billy Aldrich #4 (1977–79)
- David Canary as Warner Far Wind (1979, 1980)
- Paul Carr as Dr. Paul Summers (1976-1977)
- Dixie Carter as Dr. Linda Elliott (1977)
- Peggy Cass as H. Sweeney (1978-1979)
- Faith Catlin as Desk Nurse (1969)
- Zaida Coles as Anna Ford (1968–1970)
- Geraldine Court as Ann Larimer (1973–1975, 1976–1977)
- Augusta Dabney as Theodora Van Allen (1980–1981)
- Ted Danson as Dr. Mitchell Pearson (1977)
- Nancy Donohue as Nancy Bennet (1968–1969)
- Olympia Dukakis as Mrs. Martin (1978)
- Mark Goddard as Lt. Paul Reed (1982)
- Dorothy Fielding as Sara Dancy Powers (1977–1979)
- Julia Duffy as Penny Davis (1973–1974, 1975–1977)
- Jonathan Frakes as Tom Carroll (1977–1978)
- Jock Gaynor as Dr. William Scott (1963–1964)
- Gil Gerard as Dr. Alan Stewart (1973–1976)
- Katherine Glass as Mary Jane "M. J." Match (1978–1981)
- Karen Lynn Gorney as Nursing Student (1969)
- Gracie Harrison as Greta Van Allen Powers #5 (1980-1981)
- Kathryn Harrold as Nola Dancy Aldrich #1 (1976–1977)
- John Heffernan as Professor Everett Chambers (1976)
- Earl Hindman as Roy Griffin (1974)
- Patrick Horgan as Dr. John Morrison (1970–1974)
- Anna Maria Horsford as Group Therapy Patient (1977)
- Jennifer Houlton as Greta Van Allen Powers (1971-1980)
- Alvin Ing as Dr. Chiang (1974)
- House Jameson as Nathan Bunker (1967–1968)
- Adam Kennedy as Brock Hayden (1965)
- Dianne Kirksey as Bobbi Duvall (1980–81)
- Terry Kiser as Dr. John Rice (1967–1968)
- Swoosie Kurtz as Uncredited (Year Unknown)
- Barbara Lang as Marilyn Langley (1982)
- Louise Lasser as Jackie
- Laryssa Lauret as Dr. Karen Werner (1967–1969, 1971–1972, 1975)
- Elizabeth Lawrence as Virginia Dancy (1976–78)
- Jean LeClerc as Dr. Jean-Marc Gautier (1982)
- Karl Light as Dave Davis (c. 1963–1966)
- Pamela Lincoln as Doreen Aldrich #2 (1977–1979)
- Susan Lucci as Uncredited Outpatient Day Player (Late 1969)
- Franc Luz as Dr. John Bennett (1979-1981)
- Valerie Mahaffey as Ashley Bennett (1979-1981)
- Sam McMurray as Norman Rowan (1980)
- Meg Mundy as Mona Aldrich Croft (1972–1973, 1975–1982)
- Denise Nickerson as Katie Harris
- James Noble as Dr. Bill Winters (1967–1968)
- Terry O'Quinn as Dr. Jerry Dancy (1981)
- Ray "Cliff Owens as Dr. Richard Styner (1968)
- Petronia Paley as Dr. Jessie Rawlings (1977–78)
- John Pankow as Danny Martin (1981–1982)
- Holly Peters as Nurse Kathy Ryker #3 (1972–1973)
- Carol Pfander as Nurse Kathy Ryker #1 (1970–1971)
- Nancy Pinkerton as Viveca Strand (1979-1981)
- Carol Potter as Betsy Match (1977)
- Ralph Purdum as Phillip Townsend III (1968–1969)
- Victoria Racimo as Tia Mahala
- Larry Riley as Calvin Barnes (1980-1982)
- Rex Robbins as Murray Glover (1981–82)
- Conrad Roberts as Ed Stark (1968–1969)
- Earl Rowe as Evan Fleming
- Mercedes Ruehl as Nurse Ursula (1977)
- Richard Sanders as the Bartender (1974)
- P. Jay Sidney as Paul Stark (1968–1969)
- Hillary B. Smith as Kit McCormack, R. N. (1982)
- Jocelyn Somers as Jessica Bartok
- Tom Spratley as Fred Sanders (1974)
- Nancy Stafford as Adrienne/Felicia Hunt (dual role) (1982)
- Count Stovall as Dr. Hank Chambers (1978–79,1981)
- Anna Stuart as Toni Ferra Powers (1971–1976)
- Robert Frank Telfer as Luke Dancy (1976–1982)
- Marie Thomas as Lauri James Iverson (1972,1973–1975)
- Pamela Toll as Liz Wilson (1966–1970)
- Kathleen Turner as Nola Dancy Aldrich #2 (1978–1979)
- Nana Visitor as Darcy Collins (1980–81)
- Nicholas Walker as Brad Huntington (1980–81)
- Peter Walker as Edmund Powell (1980)
- Sigourney Weaver (pre 1976)
- Beatrice Winde as Lillian Foster (1980–81)
- Jennifer Wood as Doreen Aldrich #1 (1977)
- Ian Ziering as Erich Aldrich #5 (1981–1982)
- Kim Zimmer as Nola Dancy Aldrich #3 (1979–1982)

Among the guest stars on The Doctors were

- Johnny Carson as himself
- Don Imus as himself
- Bob Braun as Newspaper Reporter
- Melba Moore as herself on the March 20th, 1978 episode performing "I got Love" & "Stranger in Paradise"
- Judy Collins as Judith Howard
- Tony Randall as himself
- Brooke Shields as Elizabeth Harrington.

== Main crew ==
Some notable writers, producers and directors of The Doctors: Henry Kaplan, Dennis Brite, Douglas Marland, Frank Salisbury, Malcolm Marmorstein, Rita Lakin, Elizabeth Levin, Gerald Straub, Orvin Tovrov, Allen Potter, Joseph Stuart, Robert Costello, Leonard Kantor, Eileen and Robert Mason Pollock, David Cherrill, Peter Brash, Doris Quinlan, A.M. Barlow, Heather Matthews, Kate Brooks, Ralph Ellis, James Lipton, Eugenie Hunt, William T. Anderson (Lighting).

=== Head writers ===
- Orin Tovrov, April 1, 1963 – July 1, 1966
- Ian Martin, July 4, 1966 – January 13, 1967
- John Kubek, January 16- June 16, 1967
- Rita Lakin, June 19, 1967 – May 31, 1968
- Rita Lakin and Rick Edelstein, June 3, 1968 – June 26, 1969
- Rick Edelstein, June 27, 1969 - November 6, 1969
- Ira Avery, November 7, 1969 – April 17, 1970
- Ira Avery and Stanley H. Silverman, April 20, 1970 – September 25, 1970
- Eileen and Robert Mason Pollock, September 28, 1970 – August 19, 1975
- Robert Cenedella, August 20, 1975 - February 19, 1976
- Margaret DePriest, February 20, 1976 - September 17, 1976
- Douglas Marland, September 20, 1976 – September 30, 1977
- Mel Brez and Ethel Brez, October 3, 1977 - April 10, 1978
- Linda Grover and David Cherrill, April 11, 1978 – February 26, 1979
- Elizabeth Levin and David Cherrill, February 27, 1979 - December 14, 1979
- Ralph Ellis and Eugenie Hunt, December 17, 1979 – October 31, 1980
- Lawrence Konner and Ronnie Wencker-Konner, November 3, 1980 – September 4, 1981
- Elizabeth Levin, September 7–December 18, 1981
- Harding Lemay and Stephen Lemay, December 21, 1981 – June 4, 1982
- Barbara Morgenroth and Leonard Kantor, June 7 – December 31, 1982

=== Executive producers ===
- Orin Tovrov and Jerry Layton, April 1, 1963– July 16, 1965
- Jerry Layton, July 19, 1965– August 25, 1967
- Allen M. Potter, August 28, 1967– September 4, 1973
- Joseph Stuart, August 10, 1973– July 1, 1975
- Jeff Young, August 20, 1975– July 12, 1977
- Chuck Weiss, July 13, 1977– August 3, 1979
- Doris Quinlan, August 6, 1979– November 21, 1980
- James A. Baffico, November 24, 1980– November 20, 1981
- Robert Costello, November 23, 1981– March 26, 1982
- Gerald Straub, March 29- December 31, 1982

== Awards and nominations ==
=== Daytime Emmy Award wins ===
==== Drama series and performer categories ====
Category	Recipient	Role	Year
Daytime Emmy Award for Outstanding Drama Series			1971, 1972 & 1974
Daytime Emmy Award for Outstanding Lead Actor	James Pritchett	Dr. Matt Powers	1978
Daytime Emmy Award for Outstanding Lead Actress	Elizabeth Hubbard	Dr. Althea Davis	1974

=== Primetime Emmy Award wins ===
- 23rd Primetime Emmy Awards (Drama Series)
- 24th Primetime Emmy Awards (Drama Series)
