= Trump Card (game show) =

US television program

- Created by: Terry Mardell
- Developed by: Terry Mardell; Jenny Leah; Peter R. Berlin; Rob Fiedler
- Directed by: Rob Fiedler; Bill Carruthers
- Presented by: Jimmy Cefalo; Debi Massey
- Announcer: Chuck Riley
- Theme music composer: Robert A. Israel for Score Productions
- Country of origin: United States
- Original language: English
- No. of seasons: 1
- No. of episodes: 180

Production
- Executive producers: Terry Martell; Peter R. Berlin; Rob Fiedler
- Producer: Peter R. Berlin
- Production locations: Trump Castle, Atlantic City, New Jersey
- Editor: Bruce Motyer
- Running time: 30 minutes
- Production companies: Createl Ltd. Fiedler/Berlin Productions; Telepictures Productions

Original release
- Network: Syndication
- Release: September 10, 1990 – May 24, 1991

Trump Card is an American syndicated game show that aired from September 10, 1990, to May 24, 1991, hosted by Jimmy Cefalo. Debi Massey served as hostess and Chuck Riley was the announcer. The show was produced by Telepictures Productions, Createl, Ltd., and Fiedler-Berlin Productions, with Warner Bros. Television distributing. It was based on the British game show Bob's Full House, which consisted of contestants trying to answer questions to fill up a 15-square bingo board.

The show was filmed at the Trump Castle (now known as "Golden Nugget Atlantic City") casino hotel in Atlantic City, New Jersey. Donald Trump made a cameo appearance on its premiere episode to inaugurate the show with Cefalo.

Launching the same day as The Quiz Kids Challenge and revivals of The Joker's Wild and Tic-Tac-Dough, Trump Card joined those series and The Challengers (which premiered a week before) as one of five new syndicated game shows for the 1990–91 television season. All five shows were cancelled after one single season. After the season concluded, reruns aired until September 6, 1991.

== Front game ==
Three contestants were each given a bingo-style card with 15 numbered squares arranged in a 5x3 grid, and competed to "black out" (cover up) all 15 squares by answering trivia questions correctly. One contestant had the numbers 1–15; the second, 16–30; and the third, 31–45. These numbers were also used in an audience game, described below.

=== Round one ===
Four categories were displayed, each containing four questions, and the winner of a random backstage draw chose one to start the round. Cefalo read a toss-up question; if a contestant buzzed-in with the correct answer, one corner square of his/her card was covered up and he/she chose the next category. An incorrect buzz-in answer or no response froze the contestant out of the next question (meaning all uncovered squares went black), whose category was chosen by Cefalo. The first contestant to cover up all four corner squares of his/her card won $750.

=== Round two ===
At the beginning of this round, the contestants were each given a Trump Card. After giving a correct answer, a contestant could play their Trump Card at any time during the match to impede the progress of one of his/her opponents. That contestant would have his/her card blocked with a giant letter T, which could only be removed with a correct answer and the contestant hindered by the Trump Card was still froze out of the next question for an incorrect answer or no response.

Four new categories were displayed, each now containing five questions, and the winner of round one chose the first category. Gameplay proceeded as in the first round, but every correct answer now filled in a square on the middle row of the contestants' cards. The first contestant to cover up the middle row of his/her card won $1,500.

=== Round three ===
The final round consisted of rapid-fire general knowledge questions, and each correct answer filled in one of the remaining squares on the contestant's card. As before an incorrect or no response froze him/her out of the next question. The first contestant to black out his/her card won the game, $3,000, and advanced to the bonus round. If time ran out before a card was filled, the contestant who had the most squares filled in and was not hindered by a Trump Card was declared the winner. In the event of a tie, a sudden-death toss-up question was asked of the tied contestants. The first player to answer correctly won the match while an incorrect answer eliminated the player.

All three contestants got to keep any money won during the game, and the runners-up received consolation prizes.

== Bonus round ==
The champion faced a game board of 25 numbered squares arranged in a 5x5 grid. The champion drew one card from a deck of 25, and the corresponding square was filled in on the board. He/she got to draw a second card if their Trump Card was not used during the main game.

The champion then had 45 seconds to complete a horizontal, vertical or diagonal line of five squares by answering trivia questions correctly. He/she chose a square and Cefalo read a question; a correct answer filled in the square, whereas a pass or incorrect answer blacked it out. If the champion completed a line of five squares before time expired, he/she won an additional $10,000 and the right to participate in the show's tournament of champions at the end of the season.

Three new contestants competed on each episode; there were no returning champions.

== Audience game ==
Audience members were each given their own double-sided cards. The front of each card followed the pattern of those used by the contestants. When a contestant answered a question correctly and filled in a number, audience members marked it off on their cards as well. Any member who reached the goal of a round before the contestants won $10; this payout could be collected in one, two, or all three rounds, for a maximum of $30.

The other side of the card had a 3-by-3 grid of nine numbers to be used in the bonus round. If the number drawn by the champion appeared on this grid, the audience member's winnings were increased by 50% (e.g. from $20 to $30). If the champion drew a second number due to saving his/her Trump Card, and this number also appeared on the grid, the member's winnings were doubled (e.g. from $20 to $40). Members marked off numbers as the contestant gave correct answers, and any member who completed a line of three had his/her entire winnings total doubled.

Audience members could win up to $120, by winning $10 in each of the three rounds, doubling the money with two matching draws in the bonus round, and doubling again by completing a line of three numbers.

== $100,000 Tournament of Champions ==
Toward the end of the season, the twenty-one biggest money winners were invited back to compete for a possible $100,000 in a tournament of champions.

Seven preliminary matches were played with winners receiving $3,000, but no additional money awarded for winning either of the first two rounds. The bonus round was still played, with the same $10,000 prize awarded. After the preliminaries, the winner who performed the best was given the first berth in the final match. The other six winners played in two matches the following two days to determine the other two finalists.

The final match was played for $10,000, with the runners-up each receiving $2,500 for advancing that far. The winner then played the bonus round one final time. This time, he/she was given a choice of three different question packets to choose from before the game began. After choosing the packet and his/her free space(s), the round was played as it normally would be; the only difference was that if the tournament winner successfully completed it, he/she won $100,000. The $100,000 grand prize unfortunately went unclaimed as the tournament winner was unable to complete the bonus round successfully.
