= New Federal Theatre =

Theatre company in New York City

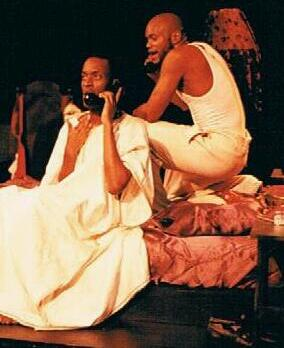
Charles Reese (James Baldwin) and Forrest McClendon (Ethereal) in the original Off-Broadway production of James Baldwin: A Soul on Fire, New Federal Theatre, New York, c. 2000

The New Federal Theatre is a theatre company named after the African-American branch of the Federal Theatre Project, which was created in the United States during the Great Depression to provide resources for theatre and other artistic programs. The company has operated out of a few different locations on Henry Street on the Lower East Side of Manhattan. Since 1970, the New Federal Theatre has provided its community with a stage and collection of talented performers to express the voices of numerous African-American playwrights.

The New Federal Theatre boasts nationally known playwrights such as Ron Milner (Checkmates), Ed Bullins (The Taking of Miss Janie), and Ntozake Shange (For Colored Girls Who Have Considered Suicide/When the Rainbow is Enuf) as well as actors including Jackée Harry, Morgan Freeman, Denzel Washington, Debbie Allen, Phylicia Rashad, Dick Anthony Williams, Glynn Turman, Taurean Blacque, Samuel L. Jackson, and Laurence Fishburne.

== History ==
Through a Mobilization for Youth theatre program, he New Federal Theatre was founded in 1970 by Woodie King Jr. in the multi-ethnic area of the Lower East Side of Manhattan, New York City. The company received its original funding from a small grant by the New York State Council of Arts and by the Henry Street Settlement. While the first season was conducted in the St. Augustine Church basement, construction of the Louis Abrons Arts Center was completed in 1974 through the Henry Street Settlement.

The administrative offices of New Federal Theatre moved back to St. Augustine's Church in 1996 while the company continues to work out of the Louis Abrons Art Center where it holds productions and training programs. Today, the New Federal Theatre maintains acting and playwriting workshops for their students at the Dewey Cultural Center located on St. Nicholas Avenue in New York City. The Department of Cultural Affairs recently cut its $15,000 funding to the New Heritage Theatre Group, the New Federal Theatre, and the Negro Ensemble Company, which the companies intend to appeal.

== Important individuals ==
- Woodie King Jr. - Founder - Producer - Director
- Laurie Carlos - Director
- Shauneille Perry - Director
- Pat White - Company Manager
- Paula Moss - Choreographer
- Judy Dearing - Costume Design
- Judy Kadiatou - Costume Design
- Ed Montgomery - Musical Arrangement and Direction
- Richard C. Mills - Set designer
- Bernard Gersten - Producer
- Joseph Papp - Producer

== Mission statement ==
The New Federal Theatre brings the enjoyment of live stage to minorities on the Lower East Side as well as in the greater Metropolitan surroundings. The companies existence has brought numerous up-and-coming actors, designers, directors and playwrights to national attention in their fields.

"New Federal Theatre's mission is to integrate minorities and women into the mainstream of American theatre by training artists for the profession, and by presenting plays by minorities and women to integrated, multicultural audiences-plays which evoke the truth through beautiful and artistic re-creations of ourselves."

== Playwrights ==
Playwrights developed their voices in African-American theatre through the Federal Theatre Company, including such notable playwrights as Ntozake Shange, Ron Milner, Richard Abrons, and others listed below.

- Richard Abrons - The Brothers Berg (2000), Whose Family Values! (2003), Every Day a Visitor (2001)
- Trazana Beverley - The Spirit Moves (1994)
- Jay Broad - Conflict of Interest (2000)
- Ed Bullins - The Taking of Miss Janie (1975)
- China Clark - Bessie Speaks (1994)
- Clare Coss - Our Place in Time (2000)
- Ruby Dee - My One Good Nerve (1998)
- Donald Thomas Evans - It's Showdown Time (1976)
- Rudolph Fisher - The Conjure Man Dies: A Mystery Tale of Dark Harlem (1932) (2001)
- Jennie Elizabeth Franklin - Black Girl (1971) (1995)
- P.J. Gibson - Long Time Since Yesterday (1985)
- Don Wilson Glen - American Menu (2003)
- Lee Gundersheimer - Incommunicado (1997)
- Nikos Kazantzakis - Christopher Columbus (1998)
- Oliver Lake - The Matador of 1st and 1st (1995)
- Marcia L. Leslie - The Trial of One Short-Sighted Black Woman Vs. Mammy Louise and Safreeta Mae (1999)
- Robbie McCauley - My Father and the Wars (1986)
- Ron Milner - Urban Transitions (2002), Defending the Light (2000), Checkmates (1988), (1996)
- Ntozake Shange - For Colored Girls Who Have Considered Suicide/When the Rainbow is Enuf (1976), (1995)
- Howard Simon - James Baldwin: A Soul on Fire (2000)
- Clarice Taylor - Spermegga (2000)
- Samm-Art Williams - The Dance on Widows' Row (2000)

== Productions ==
The playwrights listed above developed their voice with the assistance from the New Federal Theatre, yet not all plays written by them were performed by the company. The productions listed below were performed by the company at a few different locations in New York City.

- Black Girl by Jennie Elizabeth Franklin in 1971
- The Taking of Miss Janie by Ed Bullins in 1975
- For Colored Girls Who Have Considered Suicide / When the Rainbow Is Enuf by Ntozake Shange in 1976
- It's Showtime by Donald Thomas Evans in 1976
- Long Time Since Yesterday by P.J. Gibson in 1985
- James Baldwin: A Soul on Fire by Howard Simon in 2000

== Critical reception ==
In the New York Times, David Dewitt described a 2000 production of James Baldwin: A Soul on Fire in the Abrons Art Center that the as "...a technically modest production; a silk bedspread and scarf-covered lamp are the most telling set pieces". Despite minimal set production, Dewitt found the biographical play of Baldwin was acted out "...with humor, style and raw emotion, it embraces its chosen territory with enthusiasm."

On February 16, 1997, Lawrence Van Gelder saw a production of Do Lord Remember Me at the Kaye Playhouse between Lexington and Park Avenue. Noting all of the cast as "veterans of previous productions of [the play]", Gelder found of their performance: "Oral history may not be malleable into shapely and convenient drama, but it rings with unshakable truth".
