= Classic TV Game Show Themes =

Compilation album by various artists
- Released: 1998
- Genre: Television themes
- Label: Varèse Sarabande/Universal Records

Classic TV Game Show Themes is a compilation CD released by Varèse Sarabande in 1998. The CD contains 20 tracks, each the theme to a current or classic game show. The disc was authorized by Game Show Network, and featured liner notes provided by the channel.

== Track listing ==
1. Wheel of Fortune - "Changing Keys" (Opening Theme From 1983 to 1989) - Merv Griffin (2:02)
2. Jeopardy! (Opening Theme From 1984 to 1991) "Think!" - Merv Griffin (2:10)
3. What's My Line? - "Rollercoaster" (Closing Theme From 1950 to 1967) - Milton DeLugg & Lou Busch (2:54)
4. I've Got a Secret - "Plink Plank Plunk" (Opening Theme From 1952 to 1967) - Norman Paris* (2:26)
5. Password (Opening Theme From 1971 to 1974) - Bob Israel (1:01)
6. To Tell the Truth (Opening Theme From 1969 to 1978) "You Don't Know How to Tell the Truth" - Bob Israel & Paul Alter (2:00)
7. Tic-Tac-Dough (Opening Theme From 1978 to 1986) "Crazy Fun" - Hal Hidey (1:48)
8. The Joker's Wild (Opening Theme From 1978 to 1986) "The Savers" - Hal Hidey (2:12)
9. College Bowl (Opening Theme From 1959 to 1970) - Don Reid (1:20)
10. The Wizard of Odds (Opening Theme From 1973 to 1974) "It's the Wizard of Odds" - Alan Thicke (3:28)
11. The Dating Game (Opening Theme From 1978 to 1980) - Chuck Barris & David Mook (2:31)
12. The Newlywed Game (Main Theme From 1977 to 1980) - Chuck Barris (2:12)
13. The $25,000 Pyramid (Opening Theme From 1982 to 1988) "Tuning Up" remake - Bob Cobert (1:14)
14. The Price Is Right (Opening Theme From 1972 to 2007) - Bob Israel* (1:08)
15. Match Game (Opening Theme From 1973 to 1982) "The Stars Are Out" - Bob Israel (1:26)
16. Family Feud (Main Theme From 1988 to 1994) "The Feud" - Bob Israel ** (1:45)
17. Card Sharks (Opening Theme From 1978 to 1981) "Double Dare" - Edd Kalehoff (1:00)
18. Jackpot (Main Theme From 1985 to 1990) - Bob Cobert (1:50)
19. Go (Opening Theme From 1983 to 1984) "Hollywood Minute" - Bob Cobert (2:28)
20. Chain Reaction (Main Theme From 1986 to 1991) "Thru Train" - Bob Cobert (2:01)
- Credited to Paris, although the theme was composed by Leroy Anderson.
- Credited to Israel, though it was composed and performed by Edd Kalehoff.
  - The liner notes for "Family Feud" incorrectly list the theme being used from 1976-1985.

== See also ==
- The Best of TV Quiz & Game Show Themes
