= Dirty Laundry (1996 film) =

1996 comedy film

- Directed by: Michael Normand
- Written by: Michael Normand
- Starring: Tess Harper; Jay Thomas; Earl Harrison; Tresa Hughes
- Cinematography: John C. Newby
- Edited by: Andrew Morreale
- Music by: James Legg
- Distributed by: Artistic License Films
- Release date: November 11, 1996
- Running time: 91 minutes
- Country: United States
- Language: English

Dirty Laundry is a black comedy-romance film that premiered at the 1996 London Film Festival, but was not released in the United States until 1998. It was written and directed by Michael Normand; produced by Hollywood Productions and distributed by Artistic License Films. It is available on DVD, rated R, and was filmed in Staten Island, New York.

== Plot summary ==
Dirty Laundry is a black marital comedy that shows the life and midlife crisis of the king of New Jersey dry-cleaning, Joey Greene.

At the National Laundrymen's Association convention, Joey (Jay Thomas), complains about his business and his thinning hair. His wife, Beth (Tess Harper), writes a relationship advice column for a magazine. Joey still loves his attractive wife, but the couple have only been intimate once in the last few years.

In conversation with a friend, Beth reveals that she has been unfaithful to her husband. Her affair is with her chiropractor, Lowel (Stanley Earl Harrison), who has his own relationship problems.

Joey meets with an outrageous psychiatrist who advises him to try sex with a different woman. When Beth catches them together, Joey says, "She wasn't a prostitute; she was a prescription."

Beth discovers she is pregnant and wants to keep the baby, but realizes that her infidelity will be obvious because Lowel is black. There is interaction with Chloe (Erin Underwood), the Greenes' adopted daughter who is in college, and Joey's aged, long-suffering parents (Michael Marcus and Tresa Hughes).

Spiteful Beth invites Lowel to move in, then Lowel's estranged wife arrives to take him home.

The movie finds humor in the psychiatrist, customer complaints at the dry-cleaning store, letters sent to Beth's column, Joey's passion for cooking, and a dating service.

== Cast ==
- Tess Harper as Beth Greene
- Jay Thomas as Joey Greene
- John Driver as Dr. Stoller
- Dana Chaifetz as Amy Stanley
- Earl Harrison as Lowell Bower
- Teresa Hughes as Betty Greene
- Michael Marcus as Max Greene
- Erin Underwood as Chloe
- Deb Armelino as Judy Tuck
- Tom Riis Farrell as Hair Consultant
- Judith Goldstein as
- Gerald Gordon as Tess Harper's Father (unconfirmed)
- Julie Hays as Gloria
- Ingrid Johnson as OBGYN Nurse
- Antoinette LaVecchia as Cathy
