= Goin' a Buffalo =

Goin' a Buffalo is a 1968 play by Ed Bullins. The play depicts a group of black people in Los Angeles during the early 1960s trying to escape a cycle of crime and begin again in Buffalo, New York.

== About ==
The play premiered at The American Place Theatre in New York City in 1968 as a rehearsed reading. In keeping with Bullins' style of Black-Oriented Realism, it is not intended to have clear resolution or message; rather, it is an attempt by the author to depict "black life, truthfully." The play was written during the movement of Buffalo's Second Great Migration, which provides more context and meaning for the character's struggles in Los Angeles and wish to move to Buffalo.

It was not originally a part of Bullins's Twentieth Century Cycle plays (a series of plays based on the African American experience independent of racial relations to white people), but was later admitted due to its characteristics that were in line with the rest of the cycle plays: naturalistic style wherein characters only display their traits to their audience and each other when they choose to. Bullins intentionally never wrote a character representative of his own views, an intention in line with the Black Aesthetic (rules for African American writing in a naturalistic way in order to educate the audience on the African American experiences).

In that vein, Goin' a Buffalo had no specific political views: it was a 'theatre of reality' wherein audiences were permitted to come to their own conclusions about the lives and experiences of some African Americans. Many of Bullins's plays contained revolutionary themes such as this, and it is for this reason that his "rueful[ly] defian[t]" writing was an enormous contribution to the off-Broadway scene for more than a decade. His characters dreamt of Buffalo, but audiences understood the painful reality that their lives would not be any different. As one of the characters puts it, "It's cats like you and your boss who make us all the time have to act like thugs, pimps and leeches just to make it out here in the world."

== Plot ==
=== Act I ===
Act I begins in Curt and his wife Pandora's apartment in West Adams, Los Angeles. Curt and his friend Rich drink beer and play chess. Their game is briefly interrupted by the arrival of Curt's friend, Art, from prison. Rich goes on to tell the story of how Art, uninvolved in any gang, stepped in to miraculously save Rich's life in a prison brawl and how Curt has been indebted to him ever since. Rich and Curt inquire as to how Art did not feel the need to become involved in any group during prison, and what landed him in jail in the first place. Art reveals that he was in for attempted murder of a woman's husband, stating simply "I guess girls are my main weakness." Pandora's friend and coworker Mamma Too Tight arrives. She is white, a heroin addict, a prostitute like Pandora, and just released from jail.

Pandora, Curt, Rich, Art, Mamma Too Tight and her boyfriend/pimp Shaky eat chicken and drink beer. They discuss Mamma Too Tight's stay in prison, and how Shaky did not visit her for fear of getting locked up himself for possible warrants out for his arrest. Curt tells Mamma that it's a man's job to protect and provide for his woman, and if he can't do that, the woman who even looks at him "should have her funky ass run into the ground like a piece of scum!". Rich and Shaky leave. Mamma starts flirting with Art, who shows no interest. She tells him that her name is actually Queenie Bell Mack, but changed it to Mamma Too Tight because she felt it fit better. Pandora descends the stairs with a cardboard box.

Pandora, Curt, Mamma and Art sit around Pandora's box. Curt, Pandora and Mamma pass around a joint, talking about moving to Buffalo, New York and beginning again. However, their plan involves still doing all the same things they were doing in Los Angeles, including having Shaky sell heroin. Art, having very little money and only a car to his name, is excited at the idea of coming with them. Mamma tries to pass Art the joint, and when he refuses, Pandora mocks Curt for bringing a "square" into the house. He then starts hitting her. Art leaps to her defense. Getting suspicious that Art is a cop, Curt gets defensive. Art assures the group he is not, and after prying from Pandora, reveals that he had a bad experience with marijuana, and almost got caught by a cop with six joints while in Philadelphia a few years ago. The group muses on Pandora's box, about prostitution, and about their upcoming departure. They are interrupted by a phone call from Deeny, the owner of the strip club where Pandora and Mamma work. He wants Pandora to come in early to rehearse a new number. Pandora mentions that he is late paying her yet again. The group leave.

=== Act II ===
Act II takes place in the strip club in which Mamma and Pandora work. The musicians are setting up to practice a new song, when they discover that the brass section quit that morning after being refused pay by Deeny. One of the musicians tells the rest of the group that Deeny is in trouble with the union, and so it's the rest of the band's last night at the club, as well. Pandora, Curt, Art, Mamma enter and ask for drinks from the bartender. The phone rings. A fight almost ensues as Curt and the musicians all try to get the phone to talk to Deeny, who is on his way. Pandora and Art talk about Mamma's heroin habit and the frustrating present. Curt tells Art that if things go south, he is to take care of Pandora in San Francisco. He recounts how they met. Shaky arrives and urges Mamma to pull in $100, to which Mamma says she needs more time, and that he's pushing her too hard. Art seduces Mamma Too Tight by telling her that Shaky doesn't understand her, that he pushes her too hard. Deeny and the bouncer arrive, and a fight breaks out when he announces the club is closing. Curt gets a glass broken on his face. The group leaves in panic.

=== Act III ===
Three days later, back at Pandora and Curt's apartment. Mamma sleeps while Rich and Curt play chess. Rich tells Curt that Art is moving in on Pandora, which Curt doesn't believe. Mamma wakes up and asks Curt for a fix, to which he answers that since Shaky got busted by the cops at the strip club with a lot of heroin on him, Mamma could get busted easily if she tried to score or turn tricks. She falls back asleep. Pandora and Art enter. He has been chauffeuring Pandora around L.A. to her bigger clients. They bought groceries, and put them in the kitchen. Art kisses her. He advises Rich on his game with Curt, moving his king into a stalemate, so neither he nor Curt win. Rich and Curt leave to go get Shaky's heroin and sell it themselves. Curt instructs Pandora to drive, and the group leaves Art with Mamma. The lights turn off. Art climbs the stairs, makes a phone call, comes back down and wakes up Mamma to have sex.

Later that day, Pandora mournfully tells Art that Rich and Curt got busted while trying to sell Shaky's heroin. Art tells her they're leaving immediately. Pandora starts to cry, telling Art that she wants to find some way to help out Rich and Curt, the way Curt would do for them. Art slaps her viciously, knocking off the sunglasses she was wearing to reveal blackened eyes. He tells Pandora to run and pack. Mamma is getting her things at Shaky's place, and then all of them are going to Buffalo. Pandora climbs the stairs as Art reminds her not to forget her box.

== Themes ==
=== Masculinity and Power ===
Every character in the play has been disenfranchised or bullied into submission in some respect: Pandora and Mamma are young prostitutes in abusive relationships; Curt and Rich are an unemployed ex-cons. Masculinity becomes a defining trait in the way the male characters see themselves. They assert power is by dominating those weaker than they, either emotionally or physically. Curt beats Pandora, which Art supposedly can't stand, but when he sells out Curt and Rich and tells Pandora she's coming with him, he in turn slaps her. Art asks Pandora, "is that what bein' a man is, bein' lucky?" to which she replies "No. It's from gettin' what you want."

=== Cyclical Behavior ===
This 'tragifantasy' repeats itself. Like Chekov's Three Sisters, the characters in Goin' a Buffalo dream of leaving their lives in one place and starting all over in another, but without any real intentions to do so. Curt and Pandora dream of one day owning property and businesses, but plan on going to Buffalo and resuming the jobs they held in Los Angeles. The characters suffer in cycles of violence and addiction, seeking ways to move out of them but being unsuccessful. The first day Mamma Too Tight returns from prison for being busted for prostitution, she is back out on the street.

=== Strategy ===
Chess bookends Goin' a Buffalo. Rich plays Curt over and over, losing every time in an attempt to beat his opponent. In the last act, Art makes a move for Rich and places his king in a defense position. Rich cannot win, but neither can Curt. As Art says, "When you play the game you look for any break you can make." This is metaphorical for not only Art's cunning in selling out his friends and taking Pandora and Mamma to Buffalo, but also for the character's roles in the repetition of their lives. All of them are concerned with moving against the tide that is pushing them into poverty and violence, but none of them are willing to settle for anything less than success, except Art. Art convinced Mamma to leave an unconscious Shaky at the strip club, which led to him getting busted for heroin. Art suggested that Rich settle for a stalemate instead of fighting to win against Curt in chess and losing. And it was Art that told Pandora to abandon her husband, even though he would not have done the same to her.
