= Geraldine Court =

American actress

- Promotional image
- Born: Geraldine Oldenboorn; July 28, 1942; Binghamton, New York, U.S.
- Died: November 20, 2010 (aged 68); Warwick, New York, U.S.
- Occupations: Actress, writer
- Years active: 1971–1990

Geraldine Court (born Geraldine Oldenboorn; July 28, 1942 – November 20, 2010) was an American actress.

== Early years ==
Court was born in Binghamton, New York, but her childhood included living in Nashville and in New Orleans. She received a Frances Fuller Scholarship and studied at the American Academy of Dramatic Arts in New York City.

== Career ==
Court portrayed Jennifer Richard Evans for three years on Guiding Light and played Ann Larimer for almost eight years on The Doctors. She also appeared on the television series As the World Turns, Another World, and All My Children. She was also, during a brief time, a writer for the serial Loving.

On stage, Court performed in national touring productions of Barefoot in the Park, Play It Again, Sam, and The Tender Trap. Her off-Broadway work includes The Lower Depths of Maxim Gorki and Possibilities. On Broadway, she performed in the chorus of Medea.

Court directed plays, including productions for the Greeley Street Theater, Forum at Lincoln Center, Manhattan Theatre Club, and Playwrights Horizon.

== Filmography ==
=== Film ===
| Year | Title | Character |
|---|---|---|
| 1990 | Love Hurts | Laura |

=== Television ===
| Year | Title | Character |
|---|---|---|
| 1970–72 | As the World Turns | Jennifer Sullivan Ryan Hughes |
| 1973–77 | The Doctors | Dr. Ann Larimer |
| 1979 | Another World | June Laverty |
| 1980-1983 | Guiding Light | Jennifer Richards |
| 1985 | All My Children | Mary Georgia |
| 1987 | Kate & Allie | Woman on the Bench (Episode: "Brother, Can You Spare a Dime?") |
