= Richard Roat =

American actor (1933–2022)

- Richard Roat in Seinfeld 1996
- Born: July 3, 1933; Hartford, Connecticut, U.S.
- Died: August 5, 2022 (aged 89); Newport Beach, California, U.S.

Richard Roat (July 3, 1933 – August 5, 2022) was an American actor.

== Early years ==
Roat was born on July 3, 1933, in Hartford, Connecticut. He was the son of Mr. and Mrs. Richard D. Roat, and he graduated from Trinity College. He pursued acting as a career despite a lack of encouragement from his dramatic coach at Trinity.

== Career ==
Before he achieved professional status, Roat performed with amateur theatrical groups around Hartford, including the Mark Twain Masquers and Oval in the Grove. He also directed the premiere production of the Tunxis Players. During those years he worked for Aetna Fire and drove a delivery truck for the Newton Robertson Bakery.

In 1957, Roat hitchhiked to New York City to seek work as an actor there. There he studied with Uta Hagen and Herbert Berghof and supported himself with jobs that included working in a gift shop and hanging wallpaper. On January 1, 1961, he replaced Michael Ebert in The Wall at Broadway's Billy Rose Theater. His other Broadway credits included Sunday in New York (1961) and Come on Strong (1962). He also performed for a season in summer stock theater in the Adirondack Mountains.

On television, Roat starred on the daytime drama The Doctors in addition to appearing on Car 54, Where Are You?, Naked City, and other programs.

In addition to his performing, Roat prepared taxes for entertainers for more than 50 years.

== Personal life and death ==
Roat died of a heart attack on August 5, 2022, in Newport Beach, California. At the time of his death, he was married to Kathy Arntzen.

== Partial filmography ==
=== Film ===
- March (2001)
- California Myth (1999)
- Heart and Souls (1993)
- Murder by Numbers (1990)
- House Made of Dawn (1987)
- American Hot Wax (1978)
- Westworld (1973)
- Babo 73 (1964)

=== Television ===
- Cold Case (2006)
- Medical Investigation (2004)
- Rock Me Baby (2004)
- Friends (2000)
- Family Law (1999)
- Seinfeld (1996)
- Melrose Place (1993)
- Who's the Boss? (1991)
- ALF (1987)
- The Golden Girls (1986)
- Dynasty (1986)
- Cheers (1985)
- Hill Street Blues (1982-1985)
- Backstairs at the White House (1979)
- Ruby and Oswald (1978)
- Kojak (1978)
- Columbo (1971)
- The Fugitive (1965)
- Car 54, Where Are You? (1962)
