= Tresa Hughes =

American actress

Tresa Hughes (September 17, 1929 – July 24, 2011) was an American stage, film, and television actress. She was nominated for Tony Award for Best Featured Actress in a Play in 1961 for her role in The Devil's Advocate. Her film and television credits included Don Juan DeMarco, Fame, and Another World.

== Life and career ==
Hughes was born in Washington, D.C., and graduated in 1947 from Forest Park High School. She attended the Maryland Art Institute and Johns Hopkins University and George Washington University before graduating from Wayne State University. She made her Broadway debut in the 1959 production of The Miracle Worker as actress Anne Bancroft's understudy in the role of Annie Sullivan.

Hughes enjoyed a Broadway career which spanned more than 30 years. Her Broadway credits included Dear Me, the Sky is Falling in 1963, The Advocate in 1963, The Last Analysis in 1964, Spofford in 1967, The Man in the Glass Booth in 1968, Beggar on Horseback in 1970, The Prisoner of Second Avenue in 1971, Golda in 1977, Tribute in 1978, The American Clock in 1980, Lolita in 1981, Woody Allen's The Floating Light Bulb in 1981, and Cafe Crown in 1989.

Hughes' movie credits included roles in Coming Home in 1978, Fame in 1980, Bad Medicine in 1985, Grandma DeMarco in the 1995 film Don Juan DeMarco, and A Fish in the Bathtub in 1999. Her television roles included NYPD Blue, Wonderland, Ed and several appearances on Law & Order.

== Death ==
Tresa Hughes died on July 21, 2011, in New York City, aged 81. She was survived by her daughter Rebecca and grandson William.

== Filmography ==
Year	Title	Role	Notes
1971	The Hospital	Mrs. Donovan	Uncredited
1973	Lolly-Madonna XXX	Elspeth Gutshall	
1973	Summer Wishes, Winter Dreams	Betty	
1977	The Sentinel	Rebecca Stinnett	
1978	Coming Home	Nurse Degroot	
1980	Fame	Mrs. Finsecker	
1985	Bad Medicine	Dr. Elisabeth Marx	
1994	Don Juan DeMarco	Grandmother DeMarco	
1996	Dirty Laundry	Betty Greene	
1999	A Fish in the Bathtub	Ida	
