= Lydia Bruce =

American actress (1931–2008)

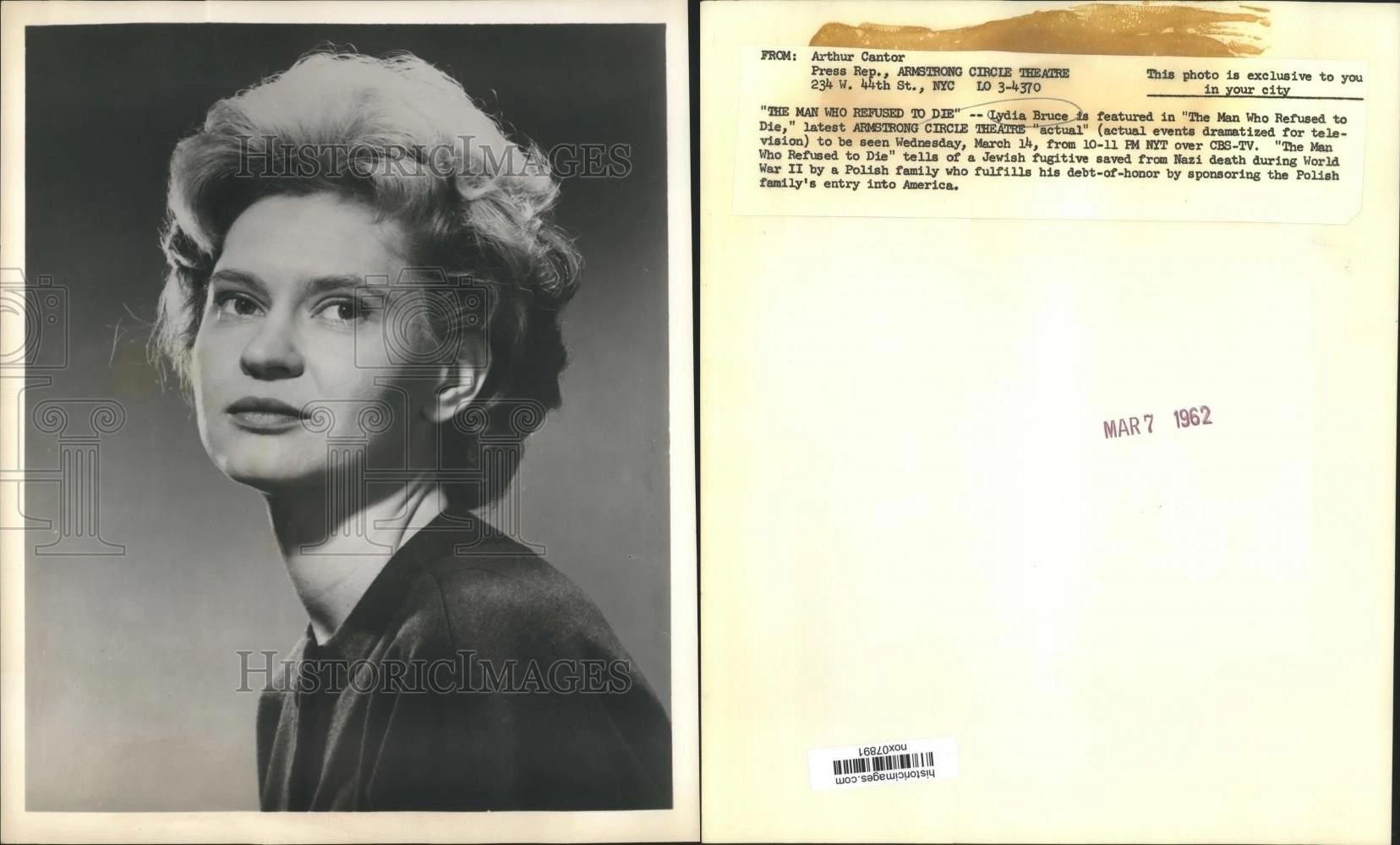
- Born: Lydia Slubowski; January 8, 1931; Detroit, Michigan, U.S.
- Died: May 7, 2008 (aged 77); Lancaster, Pennsylvania, U.S.
- Occupation: Actress
- Years active: 1961–1995
- Spouse: Leon B. Stevens (m. 1958)
- Children: 1

Lydia Slubowski (January 8, 1931 – May 7, 2008), known professionally as Lydia Bruce, was an American actress. She was best known for playing Dr. Maggie Powers in the long-running soap opera television series The Doctors.

Bruce began her acting career in 1961, playing two roles on the television series Armstrong Circle Theatre and appearing in the broadway play A Call on Kuprin.

Bruce was cast as Dr. Maggie Powers on the soap opera The Doctors in 1968, playing the role until the show finished in 1982. She briefly appeared on Guiding Light, and appeared on Law & Order as Judge Martha Kershan in 1995.

Bruce died on May 7, 2008 in Lancaster, Pennsylvania, at the age of 77.
