= Gerald Gordon (actor) =

American film, stage and television actor

- Gordon (right) with an actress from The Young and the Restless, in the 1970s
- Born: July 12, 1934; Chicago, Illinois, U.S.
- Died: August 17, 2001 (aged 67); Los Angeles, California, U.S.
- Occupations: Film, stage and television actor

Gerald Gordon (July 12, 1934 – August 17, 2001) was an American film, stage and television actor. He was best known for playing neurosurgeon Dr. Nick Bellini in the American soap opera television series The Doctors.

== Life and career ==
Gordon was born in Chicago, Illinois, the son of a liquor dealer. He studied acting with Viola Spolin at Northwestern University. He began his stage career in the 1950s, and he appeared in such stage plays as The Threepenny Opera and Compulsion. He then began his screen career in 1958, appearing in the ABC police procedural television series Naked City. In 1961, he appeared in the NBC private detective television series Michael Shayne.

Later in his career, from 1965 to 1976, Gordon played Dr. Nick Bellini in the NBC soap opera television series The Doctors, and from 1976 to 1978 and again from 1982 to 1983, he played neurologist Dr. Mark Dante in the ABC soap opera television series General Hospital. In 1979, he starred as Felix Morger in the NBC sitcom television series Highcliffe Manor, starring along with Shelley Fabares, Stephen McHattie, Eugenie Ross-Leming and Audrey Landers. He guest-starred in television programs including The Twilight Zone, The Fugitive, Hart to Hart, The Donna Reed Show and Knight Rider, and played the recurring role of Dr. Carter in the CBS soap opera television series Dallas. He also appeared in films such as Patty Hearst, Driving Force, The Judas Project and Hell Up in Harlem.

Gordon retired from acting in 1996, last appearing in the film Dirty Laundry.

== Death ==
Gordon died at the Cedars-Sinai Medical Center on August 17, 2001, in Los Angeles, California, at the age of 67.
