= Highcliffe Manor =

- Genre: Sitcom
- Created by: Robert Blees
- Directed by: Nick Havinga
- Starring: Shelley Fabares; Stephen McHattie; Eugenie Ross-Leming; Gerald Gordon; Audrey Landers
- Narrated by: Peter Lawford
- Opening theme: "Highcliffe Manor" by Frank De Vol
- Composer: Bob Alberti
- Country of origin: United States
- Original language: English
- No. of seasons: 1
- No. of episodes: 6 (2 unaired)

Production
- Producers: Eugenie Ross-Leming; Brad Buckner
- Running time: 30 minutes
- Production companies: Alan Landsburg Productions; T.A.T. Communications Company

Original release
- Network: NBC
- Release: April 12 – May 3, 1979

Highcliffe Manor is an American sitcom with a gothic horror background focused on the events in a mansion with crazy scientists and strange figures. The series starred Shelley Fabares and aired on NBC from April 12 to May 3, 1979.

== Summary ==
The plot concerned the goings on at Highcliffe Manor, a creepy old mansion on a desolate island in New England. Helen Blacke, an attractive but flaky widow, is the owner of the mansion that was home to the Blacke Foundation, a scientific research institute with a houseful of sinister characters which included Frances, a mad scientist; Bram Shelley, a bionic man; Ian Glenville, a womanizing preacher; Cheng, a huge Korean assistant; Wendy Sparkles, a sexy secretary; Rebecca, a creepy housekeeper and evil doctors Lester and Sanchez. Each episode featured voice-over narration by Peter Lawford.

== Cast ==
- Shelley Fabares as Helen Blacke (widow of the foundation's founder)
- Stephen McHattie as Reverend Ian Glenville
- Eugenie Ross-Leming as Dr. Frances Kisgadden
- Gerald Gordon as Dr. Felix Morger (former assistant to the late Berkeley Blacke)
- Audrey Landers as Wendy Sparkles (secretary to the late Mr. Blacke)
- Jenny O'Hara as Rebecca (the housekeeper)
- Christian Marlowe as Bram Shelley (the bionic man)
- David Byrd as Dr. Lester
- Luis Avalos as Dr. Sanchez
- Ernie Hudson as Smythe (valet to the late Mr. Blacke)
- Harold Sakata as Cheng

== Episodes ==
No.	Title	Directed by	Written by	Original release date
1	"The Blacke Death"	Nick Havinga	Eugenie Ross-Leming & Brad Buckner	April 12, 1979
Helen is oblivious to her tenants' designs toward her.
2	"Berkeley Cheats the Grave"	Nick Havinga	Eugenie Ross-Leming & Brad Buckner	April 19, 1979
Felix persists in his unrequited passion for Helen and the villagers make a ghastly discovery at the crypt.
3	"The Evil from Within"	Nick Havinga	Earle Doud	April 26, 1979
A plot by Helen's evil enemies is short-circuited by Rev. Ian Glenville.
4	"Love Blooms"	Nick Havinga	Rick Orloff	May 3, 1979
Dr. Kisgadden's abduction jolts her amnesiac bionic man to the realization that he is the presumed-dead.
5	"Sex & Violence"	Nick Havinga	Eugenie Ross-Leming & Brad Buckner	Unaired
Rebecca and Smythe find each other during a heart-to-heart chat and Helen's mother (Inga Swenson) visits.
6	"Stark Terror"	Nick Havinga	Carmen Finestra & John Surgal	Unaired
Helen suspects Smythe is more than a valet and sinister vapors from a coffee maker claims two victims.
