= James Baldwin: A Soul on Fire =

1999 play by Howard Simon

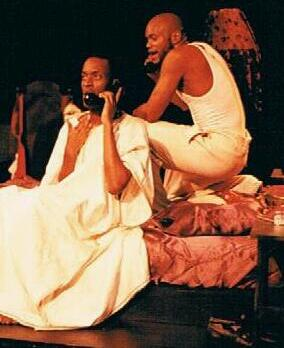
Charles Reese (James Baldwin) and Forrest McClendon (Ethereal) in the original off-Broadway production of James Baldwin: A Soul On Fire. New Federal Theatre, New York, c. 2000

James Baldwin: A Soul on Fire is an American stage play about author and activist James Baldwin. It was written by Howard Simon and first performed in 1999. Originally directed by Chuck Patterson, the first run starred Charles Reese as James Baldwin and Forrest McClendon as his counterpart, an ethereal force that takes multiple identities.

The play uses themes from throughout Baldwin's life and writing, while also portraying 1963 as a turning point in the Civil Rights Movement in the United States. The setting is Baldwin's apartment on the morning of May 24, 1963, immediately before the Baldwin–Kennedy meeting with Attorney General Robert F. Kennedy.

== Historical context ==
On May 24, 1963, American writer and activist James Baldwin met with attorney general Robert F. Kennedy to discuss the future of civil rights. He was joined by other Black leaders, including Lorraine Hansberry, Harry Belafonte, Lena Horne, Kenneth Clark, and a young Freedom Rider named Jerome Smith.

In an afterword to the 2011 text, Reese explains the particular importance of this moment in 1963 by referencing such events as the 100th anniversary of the Emancipation Proclamation, Martin Luther King, Jr.'s "Letter from Birmingham Jail", the murder of activist Medgar Evers, the 16th Street Baptist Church bombing, and the assassination of John F. Kennedy.

After the meeting, Baldwin said: "we were a little shocked by the extent of his naivete." Baldwin reported that Kennedy did not understand the situation of Black Americans and that Kennedy had laughed at Jerome Smith's suggestion that the Attorney General might personally escort Black students into the University of Alabama. The Black delegation warned Kennedy that America would experience major unrest unless the government acted aggressively to end injustice and inequality.

== Play ==
The play is set in Baldwin's New York City apartment, before dawn on the day of the meeting. Soul on Fire calls for two actors. One plays James Baldwin; the other plays Ethereal, a figure in dialogue with Baldwin who assumes the form of many people, including Hansberry, Belafonte, Horne, Clark, Smith and also an "everyman" lover of Baldwin's named Peter. In the original theatrical run Charles Reese played Baldwin, and Forrest McClendon played Ethereal.

In a central monologue, Baldwin asks: "What shall I wear to meet the Attorney General?" Baldwin must negotiate between political efficacy with America's white elite, the call of black radicalism and also a personal life—troubled by Peter—which interferes with both.

The play also examines the role of the media in producing "The Sixties", using a TV screen to show a series of Civil Rights images, including James Baldwin on the cover of Time magazine. With an image of the real James Baldwin on the TV screen, the character of Baldwin delivers a monologue on the conflict brewing in America. His speech begins: "The war is on Muthafucka and something's going to burn; something's going to burn down..."

The play uses spirituals such as "Wade in the Water" and "Keep Your Eyes on the Prize" to evoke the Black liberation struggle and to create audience involvement.

== Performances ==
The first performance of James Baldwin: A Soul on Fire took place on February 6, 1999, at the John Houseman Theatre in New York. The show was then performed four times at the Raw Space, also in New York, on April 9, 2000; it then began an off-Broadway run produced by Woodie King, Jr. of the New Federal Theatre and performed at the Henry Street Settlement Theatre. Howard Simon died during rehearsals for the Broadway performance.

A positive review in The New York Times called the play "funny, thrilling and wise, buoyed by the passionate performance of Charles Reese in the title role". Baldwin biographer (and former secretary) David Leeming writes: "[A]s a Baldwin friend and biographer, I can attest to the accuracy of Simon's imagination and, as one who has seen the play, to Reese's interpretation of Simon's vision."

== Book ==
In 2011, Charles Reese published a book including the play and commentary. The National James Baldwin Literary Society has celebrated and promoted the book, whose release in 2012 coincides with the 25th anniversary of Baldwin's death.

== See also ==
- Civil rights movement in popular culture
