= James Pritchett (actor) =

American actor (1922–2011)

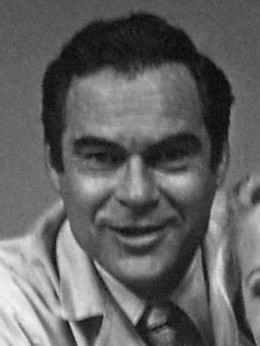
- Born: James Turner Pritchett Jr. October 27, 1922; Lenoir, North Carolina, U.S.
- Died: March 15, 2011 (aged 88); New York City, New York, U.S.
- Occupation: Actor
- Years active: 1957–1999
- Spouse: Cynthia Arnold (m. 1958)
- Children: 3

James Turner Pritchett Jr. (October 27, 1922 – March 15, 2011) was an American actor, best known for his role as Dr. Matt Powers on the soap opera The Doctors. For his role as Powers, he won the Daytime Emmy Award Outstanding Lead Actor in 1978.

== Career ==
Before creating his role on The Doctors, Pritchett played the roles of Jeff Nichols on The Secret Storm and Bruce Elliott on the CBS soap opera As the World Turns, a not-so-popular character who was having an affair with the married vixen Lisa Hughes (Eileen Fulton). He began playing Dr. Matt Powers on the soap opera The Doctors in 1963 and would play the role until 1982. He was the soap's central cast member, with the Powers character being one of the serial's "tentpole" characters. In 1978, he won the Daytime Emmy Award Outstanding Lead Actor.

Pritchett was given an audience with then-President Jimmy Carter in 1978 along with a few other select soap opera actors, such as Eileen Fulton, Susan Lucci, and Dorothy Malone.

After The Doctors, Pritchett did a short term role on another CBS soap, Guiding Light.

== Personal life ==
Pritchett was born in Lenoir, North Carolina in 1922. He met his future wife, actress Cynthia Arnold, during a stage production of Guys and Dolls in 1955. They were married three years later in 1958 and had three children.

Pritchett died aged 88, on March 15, 2011, in New York City, New York.
