= J. Samuel Cook =

American journalist

Samuel J. Cook, III is an American playwright, journalist, educator and writer currently serving as director of the 7th Ward Neighborhood Center in New Orleans, a non-profit organization designed to improve quality of life conditions for residents of New Orleans' historic 7th Ward. His one-act play Barren Fields won an NAACP ACT-SO medal in 2002. Also an educator, he formerly worked with at-risk youth at Walter L. Cohen Senior High in New Orleans. He was born in Toledo, Ohio.

== Education ==
Samuel J. Cook, III attended Dillard University and Alcorn State University, earning a BS in Interdisciplinary Studies and holds a M.A. in Liberal Studies with an emphasis in historical sociology from the University of Toledo. He pursued doctoral work at Southern University in Baton Rouge.

== Career ==
Cook began his career as a writer under the tutelage of playwright Ron Milner. As a journalist, Cook has written for The Black Collegian and Black College Wire and is a former blogger for the Clarion Ledger. He has participated in the New York Times Journalism Institute and the National Association of Black Journalists Student Projects Program. Cook is a former G.E.D. instructor for Claiborne County, Mississippi and served as an intern for the Tavis Smiley Foundation from 1998–2005. He also frequently writes for Preach2me.com, a religion and spirituality Web site.

Cook has given over seventy scholarly lectures on issues pertaining to race, culture, art and spirituality. Cook comes from a well-known black middle-class family of educators. His great-aunt, Jessie Randall, was the first African-American graduate of Mary Manse College in Toledo, Ohio and served as Middle School Supervisor for the Department of Guidance and Counseling in Detroit Public Schools. She was also the first black woman to play classical piano for the Toledo Symphony Orchestra. His grandmother, The Rev. Cassandra Cook-Butler, was a minister, social worker and pre-school teacher. His great-grandfather and great-great-grandfather, both named Samuel Cook, were both engineers and his great-grandmother was a nurse. He is a descendant of Mary Belle Thompson, a well-known minister who founded the Pinewood Tabernacle Church in Toledo, Ohio. His great-uncle is the Rev. Dr. Richard M. Randall, pastor of the Church of the New Covenant in Detroit, MI.

In 2012 Cook joined the Obama for America campaign as coordinator for Louisiana.

== Awards and Commendations ==
Cook has received numerous awards and commendations, including a nomination for EBONY Magazine's "Top 30 Under 30" Youth Leaders feature in 2006, the Tavis Smiley Foundation Youth Leadership Award in 2004, a Toledo NAACP Excellence in Education Award in 2002, the Toledo NAACP Activist of the Year Award in 2001 and a Proclamation from the City of Toledo, Ohio's Mayor, Jack Ford, in 2000. Cook is also a member of Omega Psi Phi.
