= Woodie King Jr. =

American director and producer (1937-2026)

Woodie King, Jr.
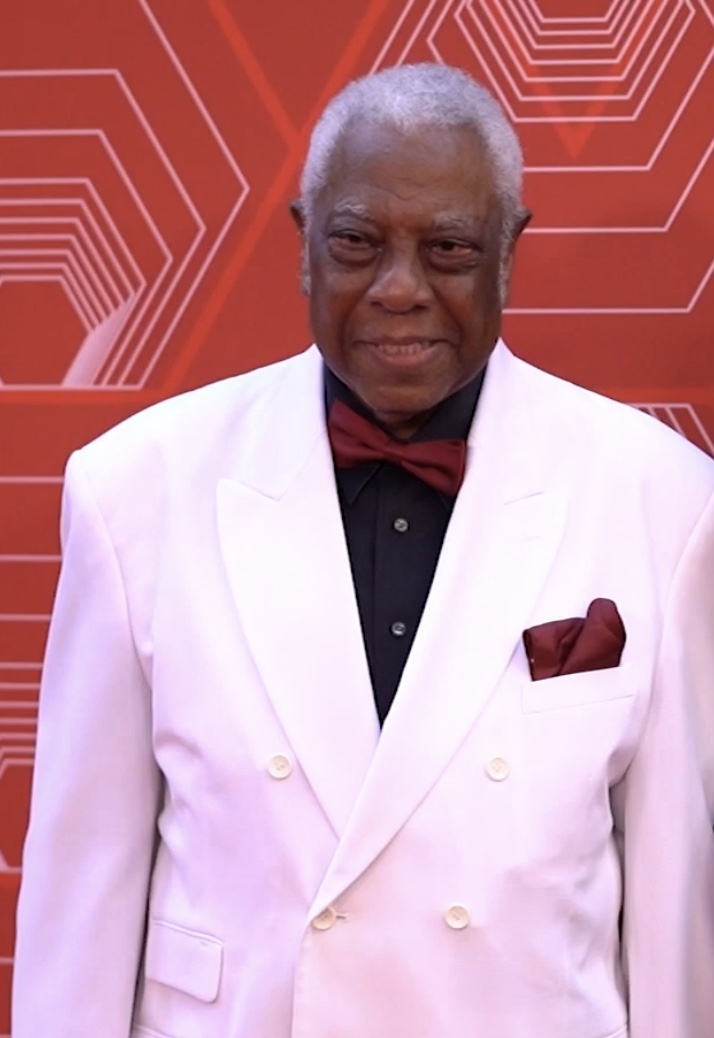
- King at the 74th Tony Awards in 2021
- Born: July 27, 1937; Bladon Springs, Alabama, U.S.
- Died: January 29, 2026 (aged 88); New York City, U.S.
- Education: Lehman College; Brooklyn College
- Occupations: Director, producer
- Spouse: Willie Mae Washington (Married 1959)

Woodie King Jr. (July 27, 1937 – January 29, 2026) was an American film and theatre actor, producer and director. Renowned for his pioneering career, he dedicated himself to increasing the representation of African-American voices in the performing arts. King is credited with producing and directing more than 400 performances across the United States. He has been hailed by theatre arts journalists as "the Renaissance Man of Black Theatre".

King is best known as the founding director of the New Federal Theatre in New York City, with a mission to amplify the voices of Black artists, women, other underrepresented identities. Numerous African-American artists who are highly prominent in the entertainment industry today performed at the New Federal Theatre in the early years of their careers, including Morgan Freeman, Denzel Washington, Samuel L. Jackson, Lawrence Fishburne, Debbie Allen, Phylicia Rashad, Loretta Devine, Jackie Harry, Reginald Vel Johnson, Al Freemon Jr. and more.

He retired from his role as the producing director at the New Federal Theatre in 2021, but he remained on the board.

King is widely celebrated for his transformative influence on the development and public recognition of Black voices in the performing arts. He has received numerous awards and honors throughout his career. His recognitions include the John Hay Whitney Fellowship at The American Place Theater, the Venice Festival Award and the International Short Film Festival Oberhausen Award for The Game, and the International Film Critics Award for Right On. He also earned the A. Philip Randolph Award at the New York Film Festival for Epitaph, as well as an NAACP Image Award for his direction of Checkmates. King won AUDELCO Awards for Best Director and Best Play for Robert Johnson: Trick The Devil, and later received an Obie Award for Sustained Achievement, the Actors' Equity Association's Paul Robeson Award, and its Rosetta LeNoire Award. He was inducted into the American Theater Hall of Fame and honored with the Tony Honors for Excellence in the Theatre.

== Education and career ==
King was born in Bladon Springs, Alabama, United States, on July 27, 1937. After his parents separated, he and his mother moved to Detroit, Michigan.

He graduated high school in 1956. He then started a job at the Ford Motor Company as an arc welder. From 1958 to 1962 King attended The Will-O-Way School of Theatre in Detroit on a scholarship. From 1959 to 1962, he wrote drama criticism for the Detroit Tribune. In 1960, King cofounded the Concept-East Theatre in Detroit with Ron Milner, serving as the manager and director until 1963.

After moving to New York in 1964, King was awarded the John Hays Whitney Fellowship to study theatre direction and administration at The American Place Theatre. That same year, he started a position as the Cultural Arts Director at Mobilization for Youth, where he stayed for five years. In 1970, King founded the New Federal Theatre in the Lower East Side of New York City, establishing a space dedicated to producing works by and about people of color and preserving the voices of underrepresented communities. In 1974, he founded The National Black Touring Circuit to support and present Black theater productions nationwide, helping ensure that Black stories and artists reached broader audiences.

In 1996, King earned a B.A. degree in Self-Determined Studies, with a focus on Theatre and Black Studies from Lehman College. In 1999, he graduated from Brooklyn College in New York with a M.F.A. in Theater with a concentration in Directing.

In 2008, King was awarded an honorary doctorate of Humane Letters by Lehman College. King held a doctorate in Humane Letters from Wayne State University. He also held honorary doctorate degrees from the College of Wooster and John Jay College of Criminal Justice.

== Death ==
King died from complications of heart surgery in New York City, on January 29, 2026, at the age of 88.

== Credits ==
King has a long list of credits in film, television, and stage direction and production, including the following:

=== Film ===
Year	Title	Role	Ref.
1967	Sweet Love, Bitter	Actor: Woodie King Jr.	
1972	Together for Days	Actor: Jerry	
1973	Serpico	Actor: Larry	
1976	The Long Night	Writer, Director, Actor: Steely	
2012	Men in Black 3	Actor: HQ Guard	
2015	Staten Island Summer	Actor: Mr. Stewart	

=== Television ===
Year	Title	Role	Ref.
1968	N.Y.P.D.	Actor: Lewis Episode: "Which Side Are You Own?"	
1981	Death of a Prophet	Director	
1983	Love to all, Lorraine	Director	
1994	Law & Order	Actor: Clayton Episode: "Wager"	
2009	Law & Order: SVU	Actor: Parking Attendant Episode: "Perverted"	
2011	Treme	Actor Episode: "Slip Away"	
2014	Unforgettable	Actor: Barry	

=== Theatre ===
Year	Title	Role	Playwright	Venue	Ref.
1968	The Great White Hope	Performer (Drummer)	Howard Sackler	Alvin Theatre	
1974	What the Wine Sellers Buy	Producer	Ron Milner	Vivian Beaumont Theater	
1975	The Talking of Miss Janie	Producer	Ed Bullins	The Henry Street Settlement	
1975	The First Breeze of Summer	Producer	Leslie Lee	Palace Theatre	
1976	For Colored Girls Who Have Considered Suicide / When the Rainbow is Enuf	Producer	Ntozake Shange	The Public Theater	
1976	Sizwe Banzi Is Dead	Director	Athol Fugard, John Kani, Winston Ntshona	Pittsburgh Public Theater	
1979	Daddy	Director	Ed Bullins		
1980	Reggae	Executive Producer	Melvin Van Peebles, Stafford Harrison	Biltmore Theatre	
1984	AmeriCain Gothic	Director	Paul Carter Harrison		
1985	Appear and Show Cause	Director	Stephen Taylor	Harry De Jur Playhouse	
1985	I Have a Dream	Director	Josh Greenfield		
1988	Splendid Mummer	Director	Lonne Elder III	American Place Theatre; Arena Stage	
1988	Checkmates	Director	Ron Milner	Richard Rogers Theater	
1989	God’s Trombones	Director	James Weldon Johnson	Theater of Riverside Church	
1993	Robert Johnson: Trick the Devil	Director	Bill Harris	Harry De Jur Playhouse	
1993	Good Black Don't Crack		Rob Penny	Billie Holiday Theatre	
1994	A Raisin in the Sun	Producer, Director	Lorraine Hansberry	Alliance Theater	
1994	Mudtracks		Regina Taylor	Ensemble Studio Theater	
1995	Eyes		Mari Evans	American Cabaret Theater	
1996	Checkmates	Director	Ron Milner	Harry De Jur Playhouse	
1996	Joe Turner's Come and Gone	Producer	August Wilson	Brooklyn College	
1996	Home	Director	Samm-Art Williams	Baltimore Center Stage	
1998	Angels in America		Tony Kushner	Ohio State University	
2000	James Baldwin: A Soul on Fire		Howard Simon	New York Shakespeare Festival	
2002	Urban Transition: Loose Blossoms	Director	Ron Milner	The Harry De Jur Playhouse	
2004	Waitin’ 2 End Hell	Director	William A. Parker		
2005	The Stuttering Preacher	Director	Levy Lee Simon		
2012	The Piano Lesson		August Wilson	Seminole State College of Florida	
2012	Sowa’s Red Gravy	Director	Diane Richards	Castillo Theatre	
2013	The Fabulous Miss Marie	Director	Ed Bullins	Castillo Theatre	
2013	Every Day a Visitor	Director	Richard Abrons	Harold Clurman Theatre	
2015	Dutchman	Director	Amiri Baraka	Castillo Theatre	
2015	Most Dangerous Man in America	Director	Amiri Baraka	Castillo Theatre	
2016	Zola Neale Hurston: A Theatrical Biography	Director	Laurence Holder	Castillo Theatre	

== Awards and honors ==
- 1965: The John Hay Whitney Fellowship at The American Place Theater
- 1968: Venice Festival Award for The Game
- 1968: International Short Film Festival Oberhausen Award for The Game
- 1970: International Film Critics Award for Right On
- 1971: New York Film Festival A. Phillip Randolph Award for Epitaph
- 1988: NAACP Image Award for the direction of Checkmates
- 1993: AUDELCO awards for Best Director and Best Play for Robert Johnson: Trick The Devil
- 1997: Obie Award for Sustained Achievement
- 2003: The Actors’ Equity Association’s Paul Robeson Award
- 2005: The Actors' Equity Association’s Rosetta LeNoire Award
- 2011: Induction into the American Theater Hall of Fame
- 2020: Tony Honors for Excellence in the Theatre
