= Ron Milner =

American playwright (1938–2004)

Ronald Milner
- Born: May 29, 1938; Detroit, Michigan, USA
- Died: July 9, 2004 (aged 66); Detroit, Michigan, USA
- Occupation: Playwright

Ronald Milner (May 29, 1938 – July 9, 2004) was an American playwright. His play Checkmates, starring Paul Winfield and Denzel Washington, ran on Broadway in 1988. Milner also taught creative writing at the University of Southern California, Wayne State University, and Michigan State University.

== Early life ==
Ronald Milner was born on May 29, 1938, in Detroit, Michigan, where he grew up on Hastings Street, also known as "Black Bottom". It had "muslims on corner, hustlers and pimps on another, winos on one, and Aretha Franklin singing from her father's church on the other", said Geneva Smitherman, author of Black World. Milner would tell David Richards in a Washington Star interview: "The more I read in high school, the more I realized that some tremendous, phenomenal things were happening around me. What happened in a Faulkner novel happened four times a day on Hastings Street. I thought why should these crazy people Faulkner writes about seem more important than my mother or my father or the dude down the street. Only because they had someone to write about them. So I became a writer." He attended Northeastern High School. He also briefly attended Highland Park Junior College and Detroit Institute of Technology.

In 1962, he won the John Hay Whitney Foundation fellowship to help aid him to complete a novel, Life With Father Brown, which remains unpublished. He went to New York City to join Harvey Swados's writing workshop at Columbia University. Under the mentorship of Langston Hughes, Milner was able to get a Rockefeller Foundation grant.

His first break came in 1966 with Who's Got His Own. The play begins with the funeral of a harsh father, Tim Bronson, and ends with a tentative rebirth for his long-suffering widow and his embittered son and daughter, Tim, Jr., and Clara. The unsuspected truths that Mrs. Bronson is driven to reveal about their father ultimately enable Tim and Clara to see the real lives of their parents, as painful as it is. The expression that has historically been thwarted, which is primarily at the core in the play, is the question of black manhood. The protagonist is a highly combative and alienated son, torn by despair over ever being able to respect or love a father he has long since written off as a fierce tyrant at home and a coward at work. The show toured colleges in New York before going to the Lafayette Theatre in 1967.

The Warning—A Theme for Linda was part of the A Black Quartet with four plays by Amiri Baraka, Ed Bullins, Ben Caldwell, and Milner, produced by Woodie King, Jr. It was put up at Brooklyn Academy of Music's Chelsea Theater Center on April 25, 1969.

He met Woodie King, Jr. when he was 19. He would inspire Milner to write, and from that came Life Agony. His second work, Who's Got His Own, became a smash hit off-Broadway. These two worked together for more than forty years.

Milner was the artist-in-residence at Lincoln University in 1966–1967. He taught at Michigan State University from 1971 to 1972. Founder and director of Spirit of Shango theatre company. He also led play writing classes at Wayne State University.

Milner's works included Who's Got His Own (inspired by Billie Holiday's "God Bless the Child"), What the Wine-Sellers Buy (the first play by an African American produced by Joseph Papp at the New York Shakespeare Festival at Lincoln Center), and Roads to the Mountaintop (a tribute to Martin Luther King Jr.).

Milner served as a mentor to writer and journalist J. Samuel Cook, whom he met at a conference in Toledo, Ohio. Cook attributes the success of his award-winning play Barren Fields to Milner's direction. In 2003, Milner directed a play at the Hope Repertory Theatre.

Milner died in Detroit of complications from liver cancer. He is survived by five children and eight grandchildren.

== Works ==
- Who's Got His Own (1966)
- The Monster (1968)
- The Warning—A Theme for Linda (1969)
- Black Drama Anthology (with Woodie King Jr.) (1971)
- M(ego) and the Green Ball of Freedom (1971)
- What the Wine Sellers Buy (1973)
- These Three (1974)
- Season's Reasons (1976)
- Work (1978)
- Jazz-set (1980)
- Crack Steppin' (1981)
- Checkmates (1987)
- Don't Get God Started (1987)
- Defending the Light (2000)
- Urban Transition: Loose Blossoms (2002)
- Life Agony
- The Greatest Gift
