= Score Productions =

American musical production company

Score Productions is an American musical production company specializing in background music and themes for television shows. Started in 1963 in a brownstone townhouse on the Upper East Side of Manhattan by music producer Bob Israel, Score has created some of the most recognizable tunes in America — most identifiable by just a few notes.

Among the composers who worked for Score Productions are Charles Fox, Edd Kalehoff, Walt Levinsky, Arthur B. Rubinstein, Dick Lieb, Michel Camilo, Chuck Loeb, Billy Barber, Irving "Benny" Robbin, Charles Gross, Deborah Hurwitz, Glen Daum, Birch Johnson, Joe Kurasz and Les Fradkin.

== Legacy ==
One of the Score-produced compositions, "Come on Down", also known as the theme song from The Price Is Right, would eventually become a number one hit on Billboard's Dance Club Songs Chart for Crystal Waters in 2001. The single also marked the first time that a television theme song (and one that came from a game show) reached number one on a Dance chart, and the first to feature lyrics.

== Selected credits of Score Productions music composers ==
- Billy Barber - All My Children, American Chronicles
- Bob Israel – ABC World News Tonight Theme, All My Children, Another World, The Doctors, The Red Hand Gang.
- Michel Camilo – Goodwill Games, One Life to Live, Match Game (1998), Press Your Luck (1983), Loving, High Rollers (1987), The All New Let's Make A Deal (1984)
- Charles Fox – ABC's Wide World of Sports, Love, American Style, Happy Days, Laverne & Shirley, The Love Boat, Monday Night Football, To Tell the Truth (1969), The Match Game, What's My Line?, Wonder Woman, Rhyme and Reason
- Charles Gross – The Doctors
- Edd Kalehoff – The Price Is Right, Concentration, Tattletales (1974), Trivia Trap, Card Sharks (1986)
- Walt Levinsky – Family Feud, 20/20, Password Plus, The Price Is Right (1976 music package)
- Dick Lieb and Walt Levinsky – Swiss Family Robinson, WWII, A G.I. Diary, Search and Rescue, Dr. Simon Locke, Police Surgeon, Lovers and Friends
- Les Fradkin – One Life to Live, Capitol, Loving, various game shows
- Chuck Loeb – CNN Main Theme and various CNN cues/shows
- Arthur B. Rubinstein – The Doctors, Another World, The Red Hand Gang (theme), Sportsworld, WWII-A GI Diary, All-New Beat the Clock, Strange Paradise, The Starlost, Norman Corwin Presents, Harvey, The Price, All the Way Home, Look Homeward Angel
- Paul Epstein - Body Language, Classic Concentration, Hit Man
- Gary Anderson - Child's Play, Super Password
- Joe Kurasz - Guiding Light

== Credits of Score Productions ==
The Walt Disney Company (includes ABC)

- ABC World News Tonight
- America This Morning
- 20/20
- This Week with David Brinkley
- Nightline
- Monday Night Football
- ABC Space Shuttle
- The Royal Wedding
- Wide World of Sports
- ABC Superstars
- ABC International Championship Boxing
- Battle of the Network Stars
- Primetime Monday
- John Ritter Remembered
- Major League Baseball Game of the Week
- ABC's Wide World of Entertainment Theme
- The Kentucky Derby
- Preakness Stakes
- The Championships, Wimbledon Tennis
- Indianapolis 500
- ABC Movies
- One Life to Live
- General Hospital
- All My Children
- Loving
- NBA on ABC
- PBA on ABC
- Good Morning America 1998–1999
- The John Stossel Specials
- ABC Radio News
- The Big Showdown (Don Lipp-Ron Greenberg Productions)
- The Money Maze (Daphne-Don Lipp Productions)
- Rhyme and Reason (W.T. Naud Productions)
- ABC World News This Morning
- Chip 'n Dale: Rescue Rangers (Walt Disney Television and Disney–ABC Domestic Television, theme song composed by Mark Mueller and produced by Alf Clausen)

NBC

- Search for Tomorrow (CBS/NBC-Procter & Gamble)
- Another World (NBC-Procter & Gamble)
- The Doctors (NBC-Colgate Palmolive)
- Texas (NBC-Procter & Gamble)
- The Dr. Dean Show

HBO

- HBO Feature Presentation theme

CNN

- Worldview
- Newsday
- Morning News
- Today
- Early Edition
- Weekend A.M. News
- CNNfn
- CNN Theme (Turner)
- Larry King Live
- Managing With Lou Dobbs

RTL Group/Fremantle (including Goodson-Todman assets)

- Password (CBS/ABC) 1961–1967, 1971–1975
- To Tell the Truth (CBS/SYN/NBC/ABC) 1967–1968, 1969–1978, 1980–1981, 1990–1991, 2000–2002, 2016–2022
- Match Game (NBC/CBS/ABC/SYN) 1967–1969, 1973–1982, 1990–1991, 1998–1999, 2016–present
- What's My Line? (SYN) 1968–1975
- The Price Is Right (CBS/SYN) 1972–present
- I've Got a Secret (CBS/SYN) 1972–1973, 1976
- Concentration (SYN) 1973–1978
- Tattletales (CBS/SYN) 1974–1978, 1982–1984
- Double Dare (CBS) 1976–1977
- Family Feud (ABC/CBS/SYN) 1976–1985, 1988–1995, 1999–present
- Card Sharks (NBC/SYN/CBS/ABC) 1978–1981, 1986–1989
- Beat the Clock (CBS) 1979–1980
- Password Plus (NBC) 1979–1982
- Child's Play (CBS) 1982–1983
- Body Language (CBS) 1984–1986
- Press Your Luck (CBS) 1983–1986, (ABC) 2019–present
- Super Password (NBC) 1984–1989
- Classic Concentration (NBC) 1987–1991

CBS

- Face the Nation
- The Early Show
- Up to the Minute
- On Our Own
- Mighty Mouse: The New Adventures (Bakshi Animation)
- Guiding Light
- Hulk Hogan's Rock 'n' Wrestling (WWE)

Warner Bros. Discovery (includes Lorimar and Telepictures)

- Turner Sports
- HLN
- NCAA Football
- NBA on TBS
- Great Chefs of the East (PBS, Discovery)
- The Butter Battle Book (Dr. Seuss Special/TNT)
- Perfect Match (Lorimar-Telepictures, syndicated 1986)
- The $1,000,000 Chance of a Lifetime (Lorimar-Telepictures, syndicated 1986–87)
- Trump Card (Telepictures/Warner Bros., syndicated 1990–91)
- What a Cartoon!, Malcom and Melvin and Malcom and Melvin: Babe! He Calls Me

OTHER

- A Gorey Halloween (J. Walter Thompson)
- Get Smart (Talent Associates)
- High Rollers (Merrill Heatter/Orion, 1987–1988)
- Marlo and the Magic Movie Machine
- The Starlost
- The All-New Let's Make a Deal (Hatos-Hall, syndicated 1984–86)

INTERNATIONAL

- América Television (Peru)
- Asia Television (Hong Kong)
- NHK (Japan)
- Seven Network (Australia)
- Television Nacional de Chile (Chile)
