= Ed Bullins =

American playwright (1935–2021)

- Bullins in 1971
- Born: July 2, 1935; Philadelphia, Pennsylvania, US
- Died: November 13, 2021 (aged 86); Roxbury, Massachusetts, US
- Education: Benjamin Franklin High School; Los Angeles City College
- Occupation: Playwright
- Spouse: Patricia Cooks (m. 1962; div. 1966)
- Writing career
- Pen name: Kingsley B. Bass Jr
- Notable awards: Guggenheim Fellowship; Obie Award
- Literary movement: Black Arts Movement

Edward Artie Bullins (July 2, 1935 – November 13, 2021), sometimes publishing as Kingsley B. Bass Jr, was an American playwright. He won awards including the New York Drama Critics' Circle Award and several Obie Awards. Bullins was associated with the Black Arts Movement and the Black Panther Party, for which he was the minister of culture in the 1960s.

== Early life and education ==
Edward Artie Bullins was born on July 2, 1935, in Philadelphia, Pennsylvania, to Bertha Marie (née Queen) and Edward Bullins. He was raised primarily by his mother. As a child, he attended a predominantly white elementary school and became involved with a gang. He attended Benjamin Franklin High School, where he was stabbed in a gang-related incident. Shortly thereafter, he dropped out of high school and joined the navy. During this period, he won a boxing championship, returned to Philadelphia, and enrolled in night school. He stayed in Philadelphia until moving to Los Angeles in 1958. He married poet and activist Pat Parker (then Patricia Cooks) in 1962. Parker accused him of violence and she and Bullins separated after four years.

After completing his G.E.D., Bullins enrolled in Los Angeles City College and began writing short stories for Citadel, a magazine he started. In 1964, he moved to San Francisco and joined the creative writing program at San Francisco State College, where he started writing plays. Clara's Ole Man, which premiered on August 5, 1965, at San Francisco's Firehouse Repertory Theatre, is about an Ivy Leaguer who meets the titular Clara and several other "strange and unpleasant characters" who show her the "realities of ghetto life". It turns out that "Clara's ole man" is actually Clara's partner, a woman.

== Black House and Black Panthers ==
After seeing Amiri Baraka's play Dutchman, Bullins felt that Baraka's artistic purpose was similar to his own. He joined Baraka at Black House, the Black Arts Movement's cultural center, along with Sonia Sanchez, Huey Newton, Marvin X, and others. A 2005 history of the Black Arts Movement described Bullins as among the "leading … theater workers" of the Movement. The Black Panthers used Black House as their base in San Francisco, where Bullins was their minister of culture as of the 1960s. Black House eventually split into two opposing factions: one group, led by Eldridge Cleaver, considered art to be a weapon and advocated joining with "all oppressed people", including whites, to bring about a socialist revolution; while the other group, represented by Marvin X and Baraka, considered art to be a form of cultural nationalism. Bullins was part of the latter group. While in San Francisco, Bullins founded Black Arts/West, a theater collective inspired by Baraka's Harlem-based Black Arts Repertory Theatre project.

== New Lafayette Players ==
The director Robert Macbeth read Bullins' plays and asked him to join the New Lafayette Players, a theatrical group. The first production the New Lafayette Players performed was a trilogy called The Electronic Nigger and Others at the American Place Theatre. Electronic Nigger was about a Black man who imitates the views of the white majority. The trilogy earned Bullins a Drama Desk Award for 1968. The trilogy's title was later changed to Ed Bullins Plays for what Bullins called "financial reasons". Bullins worked with the Lafayette Players until 1972, when the group ended due to lack of funding. During these years, ten of Bullins's plays were produced by the Players, including In the Wine Time and Goin' a Buffalo.

== 1970s and later ==
Bullins returned to the East Coast in 1967. From 1973, he was playwright-in-residence at the American Place Theatre. He founded the Bronx-based Surviving Theatre, active from 1974 to around 1980. From 1975 to 1983, he was on staff at The Public Theater with the New York Shakespeare Festival's Writers' Unit. During these years, Bullins wrote two children's plays, titled I Am Lucy Terry and The Mystery of Phillis Wheatley. He also wrote the text for two musicals, titled Sepia Star (1977) and Storyville (1979).

Bullins later returned to school, and received a bachelor's degree in English and playwriting from Antioch University in San Francisco. As of the late 1980s, Bullins taught drama at the City College of San Francisco. In 1995, he became a professor at Northeastern University.

In addition to playwriting, Bullins wrote short stories and novels, including The Hungered One and The Reluctant Rapist. The Reluctant Rapist features Bullins's alter ego, Steve Benson, who appears in many Bullins works.

Bullins died aged 86 on November 13, 2021, in Roxbury, Boston, Massachusetts, due to complications from dementia.

== Themes ==
Samuel A. Hay, Bullins's biographer, writes that Bullins rejected models of theater advanced by Amiri Baraka, who wrote and promoted protest art, and Alain LeRoy Locke, who suggested that Black playwrights should condemn racism by producing "well-made plays". Instead, Hay argues, Bullins's writing aimed to "get people upset by making them look at racism in totally new ways". By contrast, the critic W. D. E. Andrews argues that the distinction between Baraka and Bullins lies instead in Bullins's efforts to describe Black lived experience, as opposed to referring to relations between Black and white people.

Ishmael Reed has been quoted as saying of Bullins: "He was able to get the grass roots to come to his plays. ...He was a Black playwright who spoke to the values of the urban experience. Some of those people had probably never seen a play before."

== Awards ==
Bullins received numerous awards for his playwriting. He twice received the Black Arts Alliance Award, for The Fabulous Miss Marie and In the New England Winter. In 1971, Bullins won the Guggenheim Fellowship for playwriting. He received an Obie Award for The Taking of Miss Janie, which also received a New York Drama Critics Circle Award. Also in 1975, he won the Drama Desk Vernon Rice Award, four Rockefeller Foundation playwriting grants, and two National Endowment for the Arts playwriting grants. In 2012, Bullins received the Theatre Communications Group Visionary Leadership Award.

== Selected works ==
=== Anthologies ===
- Five Plays (Goin' a Buffalo; In the Wine Time; A Son, Come Home; The Electronic Nigger; Clara's Ole Man)
- Four Dynamite Plays (It Bees Dat Way; Death List; The Pig Pen; Night of the Beast). New York: William Morrow and Company, 1972.
- The Reluctant Rapist (novel) Harper & Row, 1973. ISBN 0-06-010579-8
- The Theme Is Blackness (The Corner and other plays) [Dialect Determinism, The Helper, It Has No Choice, A Minor Scene, Black Commercial #2, The Man Who Dug Fish, The American Flag Ritual, One Minute Commercial, State Office Bldg. Curse]. New York: William Morrow and Company, 1973. ISBN 0-688-05012-3
- The Hungered One (1971)

=== Individual plays ===
- Dialect Determinism; or The Rally (1965)
- How Do You Do (1965)
- Goin' a Buffalo (1966)
- The Helper (1966)
- It Has No Choice (1966)
- A Minor Scene (1966)
- The Corner (1967)
- The Electronic Nigger (1967)
- The Man Who Dug Fish (1967)
- A Son, Come Home (1968)
- We Righteous Bombers (as Kingsley B. Bass Jr) (1968)
- In New England Winter (1969)
- Ya Gonna Let Me Take You Out Tonight, Baby? (1969)
- Death List (1970)
- The Duplex: A Black Love Fable in Four Movements (1970)
- The Pig Pen (1970)
- Malcolm: '71, or, Publishing Blackness (1971)
- Night of the Beast (1971)
- The Psychic Pretenders (A Black Magic Show) (1972)
- House Party, a Soul Happening (1973)
- I Am Lucy Terry (1975)
- The Taking of Miss Janie (1975)
- Home Boy (1976)
- The Mystery of Phyllis Wheatley (1976)
- DADDY! (1977)
- C'mon Back to Heavenly House (1978)
- Snickers (1985)
- Dr. Geechee and the Blood Junkies (1986)
- A Sunday Afternoon (1987)
- Salaam, Huey Newton, Salaam (1993)
- High John da Conqueror: The Musical (1993)
- Boy x Man (1997)
- King Aspelta: A Nubian Coronation (2000)
- Blacklist
- City Preacher
- The Devil Catchers
- The Gentleman Caller

== Sources ==
- Andrews, W. D. E. (1980). "Theater of Black Reality: The Blues Drama of Ed Bullins". Southwest Review. 65 (2): 178–190. ISSN 0038-4712. JSTOR 43469233.
- Ferguson, Karen (December 31, 2013). Top Down: The Ford Foundation, Black Power, and the Reinvention of Racial Liberalism. University of Pennsylvania Press. doi:10.9783/9780812209037. ISBN 978-0-8122-4526-4.
- Hay, Samuel A. (1997). Ed Bullins: A Literary Biography. Wayne State University Press. ISBN 0-8143-2616-1. OCLC 35192318.
- Menson-Furr, Ladrica (2004). "Ed Bullins (1935–)". In Nelson, Emmanuel Sampath (ed.). African American Dramatists: An A-to-Z Guide. Greenwood Publishing Group. pp. 64–77. ISBN 978-0-313-32233-4.
- Peterson, Bernard L. (1988). "Bullins, Ed". Contemporary Black American Playwrights and Their Plays: A Biographical Directory and Dramatic Index. Greenwood Publishing Group. pp. 81–89. ISBN 0-313-25190-8. OCLC 16225458.
- Sanders, Leslie Catherine (August 1, 1989). The Development of Black Theater in America: From Shadows to Selves. Louisiana State University Press. ISBN 978-0-8071-1582-4.
- Smethurst, James Edward (2005). The Black Arts Movement: Literary Nationalism in the 1960s and 1970s. University of North Carolina Press. ISBN 0-8078-7650-X. OCLC 65183823.
