= Bob Israel (composer) =

American television music composer, founder of Score Productions

Robert A. "Bob" Israel is a music composer and producer, having created the themes to ABC News programs World News Tonight, 20/20, This Week, and Nightline. He founded the company Score Productions. His themes are among "the most familiar pieces of music on television".

Israel initially dreamed of being a concert pianist but wound up scoring theme songs for game shows and television shows and background music for film and TV. He actively declines to write music for commercials, finding it "a bore" and reliant on decisions made by groups of clients.
