= Alanis Morissette discography =

Cataloguing of published recordings by Alanis Morissette

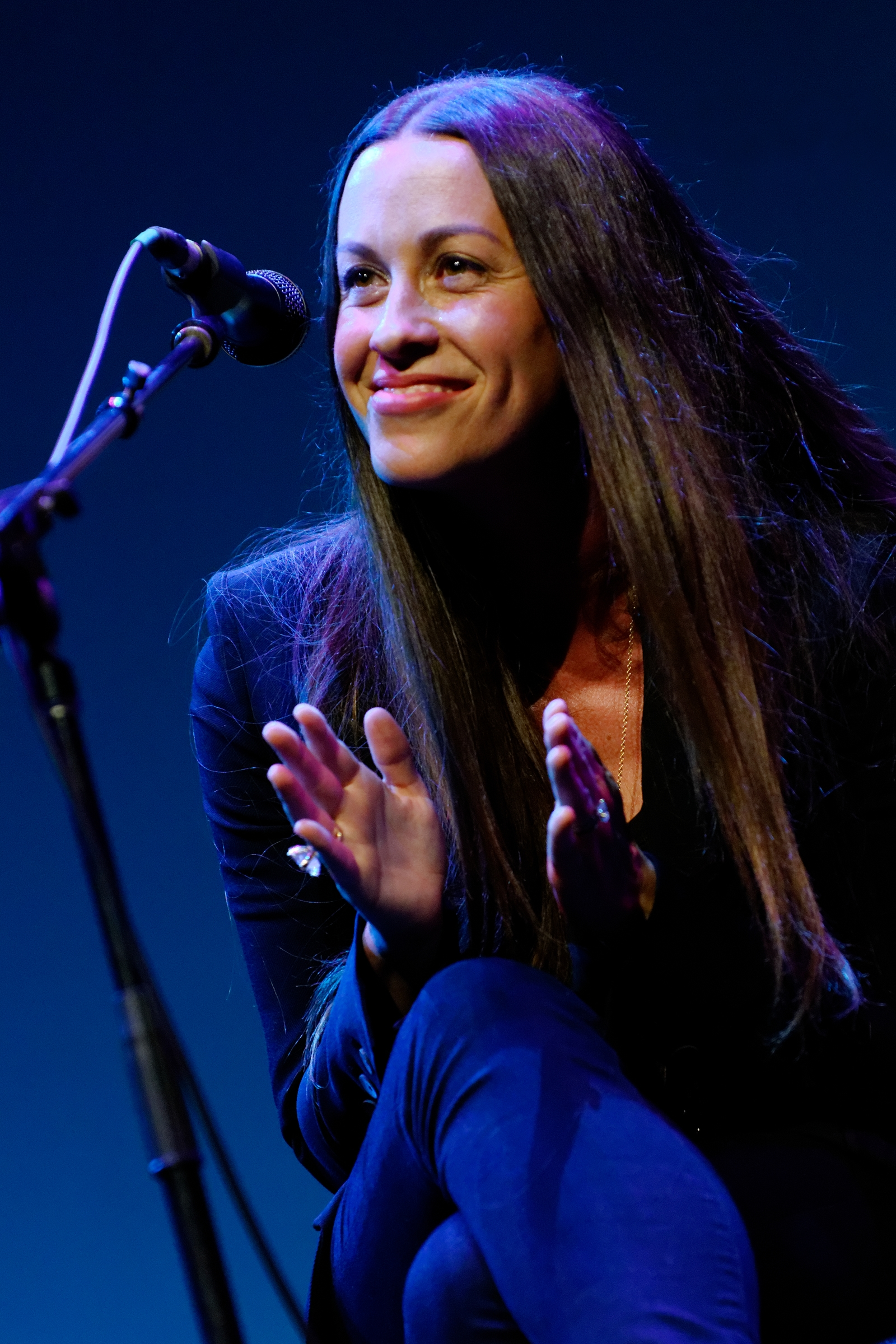
- Morissette performing at Saban Theater in Beverly Hills, California, October 20, 2013
- Studio albums: 11
- Extended plays: 2
- Live albums: 3
- Compilation albums: 6
- Singles: 46
- Video albums: 6
- Music videos: 41
- Promotional singles: 12

The Canadian-American singer-songwriter Alanis Morissette has released 11 studio albums, three live albums, six compilation albums, two extended plays, 46 singles, 12 promotional singles, six video albums, and 41 music videos. She has sold more than 75 million records worldwide.

As a teenager, she signed a record deal with the Canadian division of MCA Records for two dance-pop albums. The label released her self-titled album (1991), which was certified platinum by the Music Canada, and Now Is the Time (1992), which was less successful. These albums, released only in Canada, are often not mentioned in the media, which often incorrectly count Jagged Little Pill (1995), released on Maverick Records, as her debut album. Jagged remains one of the most successful albums in music history, the second best-selling album by a female artist (behind Shania Twain's Come On Over) and having sold more than 33 million copies worldwide. Such hits as "You Oughta Know", "Hand in My Pocket", "Ironic", and "Head over Feet" helped Morissette become the first Canadian woman to top the Billboard 200. Jagged stayed there for 12 weeks and remained in the Top 10 for a year and a half (72 weeks). Between 1996 and 1997 Morissette won four Grammy Awards, three MTV Video Music Awards, and seven Juno Awards. In addition, Jagged Little Pill, Live earned her another Grammy Award in 1998.

Morissette contributed to the City of Angels soundtrack, writing and performing "Uninvited". The song was the winner in two categories at the 41st Grammy Awards. Her fourth album, Supposed Former Infatuation Junkie, was released in 1998 and debuted at the top of the Billboard 200, becoming Morissette's second consecutive number-one album and, at the time, the fastest-selling album by a female in the United States. Supposed produced four singles: "Thank U", "Joining You", "Unsent" and "So Pure". Morissette herself directed all music videos from the album, except for the controversial "Thank U". Shortly afterwards, MTV Unplugged (sometimes titled Alanis Unplugged) was released in 1999.

Under Rug Swept (2002), her following release, debuted at number one in 12 countries, including the United States (where it was her third consecutive number-one album), and produced the hit single "Hands Clean". The album helped Morissette get the Jack Richardson Producer of the Year Award. Having many leftovers from the Under Rug Swept recording session, Morissette released Feast on Scraps, a CD/DVD package, the same year. So-Called Chaos (2004) debuted at number five on Billboard 200 and was less successful. In 2005, Morissette released The Collection, her first and so far only greatest hits compilation, and Jagged Little Pill Acoustic, which marked a 10-year anniversary of the original album. Her seventh studio set, Flavors of Entanglement, was released in 2008 and became her last album on Maverick Records. Morissette's next studio album, Havoc and Bright Lights, was released on August 28, 2012 through Collective Sounds. The album spawned three singles: "Guardian", "Lens", and "Receive".

Morissette released her ninth studio album, Such Pretty Forks in the Road, on July 31, 2020. The album's lead single, "Reasons I Drink", was released on December 2, 2019.

On June 17, 2022, Morissette released her first meditation album, The Storm Before the Calm, in partnership with the Calm app. A Christmas album titled Good Weather for Immaculate Conception followed on November 6, 2026.

== Albums ==
=== Studio albums ===
List of albums, with selected chart positions
Title	Album details	Peak chart positions										Sales	Certifications
Title	Album details	CAN	AUS	AUT	FRA	GER	NLD	NZ	SWI	UK	US	Sales	Certifications
Alanis	Released: April 6, 1991; Label: MCA (MCAD-10253); Format: CD, cassette	28	—	—	—	—	—	—	—	—	—	CAN: 100,000 (Note: Sales as of July 1995)	MC: Platinum
Now Is the Time	Released: October 20, 1992; Label: MCA (MCAD-10731); Format: CD, cassette	—	—	—	—	—	—	—	—	—	—	CAN: 50,000 (Note: Sales as of July 1995)	MC: Gold
Jagged Little Pill	Released: June 13, 1995; Label: Maverick (9 45901-2); Format: CD, LP, cassette	1	1	2	6	3	1	1	2	1	1	World: 33,000,000 (Note: Worldwide sales as of February 2010); AUS: 1,020,000 (Note: Sales as of January 2013); UK: 2,742,868 (Note: Sales as of November 2006); US: 15,200,000 (Note: Sales as of January 2020)	MC: 2× Diamond; ARIA: 14× Platinum; BPI: 10× Platinum; BVMI: 2× Platinum; IFPI AUT: 2× Platinum; IFPI SWI: Platinum; NVPI: 4× Platinum; RIAA: 17× Platinum; RMNZ: 2× Platinum; SNEP: Platinum
Supposed Former Infatuation Junkie	Released: November 3, 1998; Label: Maverick (9 47094-2); Format: CD, LP, cassette	1	2	3	5	1	2	1	1	3	1	US: 2,600,000 (Note: Sales as of March 2012)	MC: 4× Platinum; ARIA: 2× Platinum; BPI: Platinum; BVMI: Platinum; IFPI AUT: Platinum; IFPI SWI: Platinum; NVPI: Platinum; RIAA: 3× Platinum; RMNZ: 2× Platinum; SNEP: 2× Gold
Under Rug Swept	Released: February 26, 2002; Label: Maverick (9 47988-2); Format: CD, LP, cassette, DVD-A, digital download	1	1	1	2	1	2	11	1	2	1	World: 4,000,000 (Note: Worldwide sales as of February 2004); US: 1,000,000 (Note: Sales as of March 2012)	MC: Platinum; ARIA: Platinum; BPI: Gold; BVMI: Gold; IFPI AUT: Gold; IFPI SWI: Platinum; NVPI: Gold; RIAA: Platinum; SNEP: Gold
So-Called Chaos	Released: May 18, 2004; Label: Maverick (48555-2); Format: CD, LP, digital download	2	15	1	5	1	1	—	2	8	5		BPI: Silver; BVMI: Gold; IFPI AUT: Gold; IFPI SWI: Platinum
Flavors of Entanglement	Released: June 10, 2008; Label: Maverick (269308-2); Format: CD, digital download	3	17	3	6	8	7	35	1	15	8	World: 600,000 (Note: Worldwide sales as of August 2012); US: 235,000 (Note: Sales as of March 2012)	IFPI SWI: Gold
Havoc and Bright Lights	Released: August 28, 2012; Label: Collective Sounds; Format: CD, LP, digital download	1	22	1	20	2	2	27	1	12	5	GER: 100,000 (Note: Sales as of January 2013); US: 92,000 (Note: Sales as of October 2015)	BPI: Silver; BVMI: Gold
Such Pretty Forks in the Road	Released: July 31, 2020; Label: Epiphany, Thirty Tigers; Format: CD, LP, digital download, streaming	14	10	4	45	4	13	40	2	8	16		
The Storm Before the Calm	Released: June 17, 2022; Label: Epiphany, Thirty Tigers; Format: CD, digital download, streaming	—	—	—	—	—	—	—	26	— (Note: The Storm Before the Calm did not enter the UK Albums Chart but peaked at number 95 on the UK Album Downloads Chart.)	—		
Good Weather for Immaculate Conception	Released: November 6, 2026; Label: Epiphany; Format: CD, digital download, streaming												

=== Compilation albums ===
List of albums, with selected chart positions
Title	Album details	Peak chart positions								Sales	Certifications
Title	Album details	AUS	AUT	FRA	GER	NLD	SWI	UK	US	Sales	Certifications
The Singles Box	Released: April 8, 1997; Label: Maverick; Format: 5xCD	—	—	—	—	—	—	—	—		
Feast on Scraps	Released: December 10, 2002; Label: Maverick (759938533-2); Format: CD/DVD	—	—	—	—	—	—	—	194	US: 76,000 (Note: Sales as of March 2012)	
iTunes Originals	Released: June 15, 2004; Label: Maverick; Format: digital download	—	—	—	—	—	—	—	—		
Jagged Little Pill Acoustic	Released: June 13, 2005; Label: Maverick; Format: CD, LP	21	9	8	15	16	5	12	50	US: 370,000 (Note: Sales as of March 2012)	BPI: Gold
The Collection	Released: November 15, 2005; Label: Maverick; Format: CD, CD/DVD, LP	110	12	—	18	49	9	44	51		BPI: Platinum; BVMI: Gold
Alanis Morissette: Original Album Series	Released: March 12, 2012; Label: Warner; Format: CD	—	—	—	—	—	—	—	—		
"—" denotes releases that did not chart or were not released in that country.

=== Live albums ===
List of albums, with selected chart positions
Title	Album details	Peak chart positions									Sales	Certifications
Title	Album details	CAN	AUS	AUT	FRA	GER	NLD	SWI	UK	US	Sales	Certifications
MTV Unplugged	Released: November 9, 1999; Label: Maverick; Format: CD (759938533-2), MD (9 47589-8), LP	42	101	5	21	5	4	4	56	63	US: 673,000 (Note: Sales as of March 2012)	BPI: Gold; BVMI: Platinum; IFPI AUT: Gold; IFPI SWI: Gold; NVPI: Platinum; RIAA: Gold; SNEP: Gold
Live at Montreux 2012	Released: April 21, 2013; Label: Eagle Rock; Format: CD, DVD, Blu-ray	—	—	—	—	58	—	—	—	—		
Live at London's O2 Shepherd's Bush Empire, 2020	Released: November 27, 2020; Label: Rhino, Warner; Format: LP	—	—	—	—	—	—	—	—	— (Note: Live at London's O2 Shepherd's Bush Empire, 2020 did not enter the US Billboard 200, but did peak at number 55 on the Top Current Albums chart.)		
"—" denotes releases that did not chart or were not released in that country.

== Extended plays ==
List of EPs with relevant details
Title	EP details
Space Cakes	Released: October 25, 1995; Label: Maverick; Format: CD
Such Pretty Forks in the Mix	Released: December 11, 2020; Label: Epiphany/Thirty Tigers/He.She.They.; Format: Digital download, streaming
Last Christmas	Released: November 3, 2023; Label: Epiphany/Thirty Tigers; Format: Digital download, streaming

== Singles ==
List of singles, with selected chart positions and certifications, showing year released and album name
Title	Year	Peak chart positions										Certifications	Album
Title	Year	CAN	AUS	AUT	BEL (FL)	GER	NLD	NZ	SWI	UK	US	Certifications	Album
"Too Hot"	1991	14	—	—	—	—	—	—	—	—	—		Alanis
"Feel Your Love"	1991	24	—	—	—	—	—	—	—	—	—		Alanis
"Walk Away"	1991	35	—	—	—	—	—	—	—	—	—		Alanis
"Plastic"	1992	67	—	—	—	—	—	—	—	—	—		Alanis
"An Emotion Away"	1992	24	—	—	—	—	—	—	—	—	—		Now Is the Time
"Real World"	1993	84	—	—	—	—	—	—	—	—	—		Now Is the Time
"No Apologies"	1993	14	—	—	—	—	—	—	—	—	—		Now Is the Time
"(Change Is) Never a Waste of Time"	1993	31	—	—	—	—	—	—	—	—	—		Now Is the Time
"You Oughta Know"	1995	6	4	—	39	—	17	3	—	22	— (Note: The live Grammy version of "You Oughta Know" charted on the Billboard Hot 100 as a double-A side to "You Learn". "You Oughta Know" reached No. 1 for 5 weeks on the Modern Rock Chart and No. 3 on the Mainstream Rock Track Chart)	ARIA: Platinum; BPI: Gold; RMNZ: Platinum	Jagged Little Pill
"You Learn"	1995	1	20	—	—	—	—	13	—	24	6	BPI: Silver; RMNZ: Gold	Jagged Little Pill
"Hand in My Pocket"	1995	1	13	—	—	—	86	7	—	26	— (Note: "Hand in My Pocket" was not released as a single in the US and was therefore ineligible for the Billboard Hot 100, but peaked at number 15 on the Hot 100 Airplay chart and at No. 1 on the Modern Rock Chart.)	BPI: Gold; RMNZ: Platinum	Jagged Little Pill
"Ironic"	1996	1	3	—	6	8	6	3	9	11	4	ARIA: Gold; BPI: Platinum; RIAA: Gold; RMNZ: 3× Platinum	Jagged Little Pill
"Head over Feet"	1996	1	12	—	60	73	24	27	—	7	— (Note: "Head over Feet" was not released as a single in the US and was therefore ineligible for the Billboard Hot 100, but peaked at number 3 on the Hot 100 Airplay chart.)	ARIA: Gold; BPI: Silver; RMNZ: Gold	Jagged Little Pill
"All I Really Want"	1996	—	40	—	—	—	—	—	—	59	— (Note: "All I Really Want" was not released as a single in the US and was therefore ineligible for the Billboard Hot 100, but peaked at number 65 on the Hot 100 Airplay chart.)		Jagged Little Pill
"Uninvited"	1998	7	—	—	—	—	—	—	—	—	— (Note: "Uninvited" was not released as a single in the US and was therefore ineligible for the Billboard Hot 100, but peaked at number 4 on the Hot 100 Airplay chart.)		City of Angels: Music form the Motion Picture
"Thank U"	1998	1	15	10	25	19	8	2	18	5	17	ARIA: Gold; BPI: Gold	Supposed Former Infatuation Junkie
"Joining You"	1999	30	—	26	—	28	51	—	46	28	—		Supposed Former Infatuation Junkie
"So Pure"	1999	14	112	—	—	—	—	—	—	38	—		Supposed Former Infatuation Junkie
"Unsent"	1999	9	85	—	—	—	—	28	—	—	58		Supposed Former Infatuation Junkie
"That I Would Be Good"	1999	—	139	—	—	—	55	—	—	—	—		MTV Unplugged
"King of Pain"	2000	—	—	—	—	—	92	—	—	—	—		MTV Unplugged
"Hands Clean"	2002	1	9	12	40	18	15	1	5	12	23	ARIA: Gold	Under Rug Swept
"Precious Illusions"	2002	4	41	—	—	77	79	—	95	53	—		Under Rug Swept
"Everything"	2004	3	15	12	54	29	43	—	22	22	76		So-Called Chaos
"Out Is Through"	2004	—	79	—	—	75	76	—	67	56	—		So-Called Chaos
"Eight Easy Steps"	2004	—	—	—	—	—	—	—	—	—	—		So-Called Chaos
"Crazy"	2005	29	61	20	—	38	40	—	31	65	— (Note: "Crazy" did not enter the Billboard Hot 100, but peaked at number 4 on the Bubbling Under Hot 100 Singles chart.)		The Collection
"Underneath"	2008	15	—	20	16	46	—	—	16	99	—		Flavors of Entanglement
"In Praise of the Vulnerable Man"	2008	—	—	—	—	—	—	—	—	—	—		Flavors of Entanglement
"Not as We"	2008	—	—	—	—	—	—	—	—	197	— (Note: "Not as We" did not enter the Billboard Hot 100, but peaked at number 22 on the Bubbling Under Hot 100 Singles chart.)		Flavors of Entanglement
"Guardian"	2012	41	—	11	37	13	62	—	12	—	— (Note: "Guardian" did not enter the Billboard Hot 100, but peaked at number 19 on the Bubbling Under Hot 100 Singles chart.)	BVMI: Gold	Havoc and Bright Lights
"Lens"	2012	—	—	—	—	—	—	—	—	—	—		Havoc and Bright Lights
"Receive"	2012	—	—	—	33	73	—	—	—	—	—		Havoc and Bright Lights
"Reasons I Drink"	2019	—	—	—	—	—	—	—	—	—	—		Such Pretty Forks in the Road
"Smiling"	2020	—	—	—	—	—	—	—	—	—	—		Such Pretty Forks in the Road
"Diagnosis"	2020	—	—	—	—	—	—	—	—	—	—		Such Pretty Forks in the Road
"Reckoning"	2020	—	—	—	—	—	—	—	—	—	—		Such Pretty Forks in the Road
"Ablaze"	2020	—	—	—	—	—	—	—	—	—	—		Such Pretty Forks in the Road
"Happy Xmas (War Is Over)"	2020	—	—	—	—	—	—	—	—	—	—		Non-album singles
"Predator (Demo)"	2021	—	—	—	—	—	—	—	—	—	—		Non-album singles
"I Miss the Band"	2021	—	—	—	—	—	—	—	—	—	—		Non-album singles
"Rest"	2021	—	—	—	—	—	—	—	—	—	—		Non-album singles
"On the Road Again" (with Willie Nelson)	2021	—	—	—	—	—	—	—	—	—	—		Non-album singles
"Olive Branch"	2022	—	—	—	—	—	—	—	—	—	—		Non-album singles
"Little Drummer Boy"	2022	—	—	—	—	—	—	—	—	—	—		Non-album singles
"No Return" (Extended version from the Original Series "Yellowjackets")	2023	—	—	—	—	—	—	—	—	—	—		Non-album singles
"—" denotes releases that did not chart or were not released in that country.

=== Promotional singles ===
List of singles, with selected chart positions and certifications, showing year released and album name
Title	Year	Peak chart positions	Album
Title	Year	CAN Digital	Album
"Fate Stay with Me"	1987	—	Non-album single
"Flinch"	2002	—	Under Rug Swept
"21 Things I Want in a Lover"	2002	—	Under Rug Swept
"Surrendering"	2002	—	Under Rug Swept
"Utopia"	2003	—	Under Rug Swept
"So Unsexy"	2003	—	Under Rug Swept
"Simple Together"	2003	—	Feast on Scraps
"Excuses"	2004	—	So-Called Chaos
"Wunderkind"	2006	22	The Chronicles of Narnia: The Lion, the Witch and the Wardrobe
"Into a King"	2011	—	Non-album singles
"Today"	2014		Non-album singles
"The Morning"	2014	—	Non-album singles

== Other charted songs ==
Title	Year	Peak chart positions			Album
Title	Year	CAN	US Digital	US Rock	Album
"Madness"	2008	99	—	—	Flavors of Entanglement
"The Guy Who Leaves"	2008	72	—	—	Flavors of Entanglement
"Ablaze"	2020	— (Note: "Ablaze" did not enter the Canadian Hot 100, but did peak at number 13 on the Hot Canadian Digital Song Sales chart.)	24	34	Such Pretty Forks in the Road

== Other appearances ==
Song	Year	Artist	Album
"Spoon"	1998	Dave Matthews Band	Before These Crowded Streets
"Don't Drink the Water"	1998	Dave Matthews Band	Before These Crowded Streets
"Halloween"	1998	Dave Matthews Band	Before These Crowded Streets
"Mindfield"	1998	Ringo Starr	Vertical Man
"Drift Away"	1998	Ringo Starr	Vertical Man
"I Was Walkin'"	1998	Ringo Starr	Vertical Man
"Mercy"	1999	Jonathan Elias	The Prayer Cycle
"Hope"	1999	Jonathan Elias	The Prayer Cycle
"Innocence"	1999	Jonathan Elias	The Prayer Cycle
"Faith"	1999	Jonathan Elias	The Prayer Cycle
"Still"	1999	Various Artists	Dogma: Music from the Motion Picture
"Are You Still Mad"	1999	Various Artists	Live in the X Lounge II
"Hand in My Pocket"	1999	Various Artists	Saturday Night Live: 25 Years of Musical Performances, Vol. 2
"So Pure"	1999	Various Artists	Woodstock 1999
"Excess"	2001	Tricky	Blowback
"Let's Do It (Let's Fall in Love)"	2004	Various Artists	De-Lovely: Music from the Motion Picture
"Arrival"	2009	1 Giant Leap	What About Me?
"Citizen of the Planet"	2009	Various Artists	Live From the Artists Den: 1
"I Remain"	2010	Various Artists	Prince of Persia: The Sands of Time
"Professional Torturer"	2011	Various Artists	Radio Free Albemuth
"Magical Child"	2012	Various Artists	Every Mother Counts 2012
"Ego"	2013	Souleye	Iron Horse Running
"Jekyll and Hyde"	2013	Souleye	Iron Horse Running
"Tools of Divine"	2013	Souleye	Iron Horse Running
"Whatever Nice Is"	2013	Souleye	Iron Horse Running
"Snow Angel"	2017	Souleye	Wildman
"Alanis' Interlude"	2020	Halsey	Manic

== Videography ==
=== Video albums ===
List of video albums with relevant details
Title	Album details
Jagged Little Pill, Live	Released: July 2, 1997; Label: Maverick; Format: VHS, DVD, LD, VCD
Live in the Navajo Nation	Released: August 27, 2002; Label: Maverick; Format: VHS, DVD
Feast on Scraps	Released: December 10, 2002; Label: Maverick; Format: CD/DVD
VH1 Storytellers	Released: April 26, 2005; Label: Maverick; Format: DVD
The Collection	Released: November 15, 2005; Label: Maverick; Format: CD, CD/DVD
Live at Montreux 2012	Released: April 21, 2013; Label: Eagle Rock; Format: CD, DVD, Blu-ray

=== Music videos ===
List of music videos, showing year released and directors
Title	Year	Director(s)
"Too Hot"	1991	Leslie Howe
"Walk Away"	1991	Dennis Beauchamp
"Feel Your Love"	1991	Dennis Beauchamp
"Plastic"	1992	Unknown
"An Emotion Away"	1992	Unknown
"No Apologies"	1993	Unknown
"Real World"	1993	Unknown
"You Oughta Know"	1995	Nick Egan
"Hand in My Pocket"	1995	Mark Kohr
"Ironic"	1996	Stéphane Sednaoui
"You Learn"	1996	Liz Friedlander
"Head over Feet"	1996	Alanis Morissette, Michele Laurita
"All I Really Want"	1996	Various
"Thank U"	1998	Stéphane Sednaoui
"Unsent"	1999	Alanis Morissette
"So Pure"	1999	Alanis Morissette
"Still"	1999	Unknown
"Hands Clean"	2002	Francis Lawrence
"Precious Illusions"	2002	Francis Lawrence
"Everything"	2004	Meiert Avis, Marc Dones
"Out Is Through"	2004	Seth Jarrett
"Eight Easy Steps"	2004	Liz Friedlander
"Hand in My Pocket (Acoustic Version)"	2005	Unknown
"Crazy"	2005	Meiert Avis
"My Humps"	2007	Unknown
"Underneath"	2008	Sanji
"Not as We"	2008	James Whitaker
"Guardian"	2012	Baris Aladag
"Receive"	2012	Baris Aladag
"Lens"	2013	Victor Indrizzo
"Empathy"	2013	Victor Indrizzo
"Today"	2014	—N/a
"Big Sur"	2014	Eric Ernest Johnson
"The Morning"	2014	Lesley Chilcott
"Superstar Wonderful Weirdos"	2015	Brendan Huza
"Reasons I Drink"	2020	Erin Elders
"Smiling" (with Elizabeth Stanley)	2020	Sidi Larbi Cherakoui
"Ablaze"	2020	Erin Elders
"Happy Xmas (War Is Over)"	2020	Victor Indrizzo
"What Child Is This?" (with Julian Coryell)	2020	Victor Indrizzo
"I Miss the Band"	2021	Victor Indrizzo

== See also ==
- List of songs recorded by Alanis Morissette
- Vancouver Sessions
