= List of songs recorded by Alanis Morissette =

This is a list of songs sung and written by musician Alanis Morissette.

== Released songs ==
Title song	Album	Writer	Year	Ref.
"20/20"	Underneath single (B-side)	Morissette	2008	
"21 Things I Want in a Lover"	Under Rug Swept	Morissette	2002	
"8 Easy Steps"	So-Called Chaos	Morissette	2004	
"A Man"	Under Rug Swept	Morissette	2002	
"Ablaze"	Such Pretty Forks in the Road	Morissette, Michael Farrell	2019	
"All I Really Want"	Jagged Little Pill	Morissette, Glen Ballard	1995	
"Are You Still Mad"	Supposed Former Infatuation Junkie	Morissette	1998	
"Awakening Americans"	Hands Clean single (B-side)	Morissette	2002	
"Baba"	Supposed Former Infatuation Junkie	Morissette	1998	
"Bent for You"	Feast On Scraps (B-side)	Morissette	2002	
"Big Sur"	Havoc and Bright Lights (bonus track)	Morissette	2012	
"Break"	In Praise of the Vulnerable Man digital single (digital download)	Morissette, Guy Sigsworth	2008	
"Can't Not"	Supposed Former Infatuation Junkie	Morissette	1998	
"Celebrity"	Havoc and Bright Lights	Morissette	2012	
"Citizen of the Planet"	Flavors Of Entanglement	Morissette	2008	
"Closer Than You Might Believe"	Jagged Little Pill 20th Anniversary Collector's edition (Demos)	Morissette	1995	
"Comfort"	Jagged Little Pill 20th Anniversary Collector's edition (Demos)	Morissette, Glen Ballard, Terrance Sawchuk	1995	
"Crazy" (Seal cover)	The Collection	Seal Henry Samuel	2005	
"Death of Cinderella"	Jagged Little Pill 20th Anniversary Collector's edition (Demos)	Morissette	1995	
"Diagnosis"	Such Pretty Forks in the Road	Morissette, Michael Farrell	2019	
"Doth I Protest Too Much"	So-Called Chaos	Morissette	2004	
"Edge of Evolution"	Havoc and Bright Lights	Morissette	2012	
"Eight Easy Steps"	So-Called Chaos	Morissette	2004	
"Empathy"	Havoc and Bright Lights	Morissette	2012	
"Everything"	So-Called Chaos	Morissette	2004	
"Excuses"	So-Called Chaos	Morissette	2004	
"Feel Your Love"	Alanis	Morissette, Leslie Howe	1991	
"Fear of Bliss"	Feast On Scraps	Morissette	2002	
"Flinch"	Under Rug Swept	Morissette	2002	
"Forgiven"	Jagged Little Pill	Morissette	1995	
"Front Row"	Supposed Former Infatuation Junkie	Morissette	1998	
"Guardian"	Havoc and Bright Lights	Morissette	2012	
"Giggling Again for No Reason"	Flavors of Entanglement	Morissette	2008	
"Give What You Got"	Now Is the Time	Morissette, Leslie Howe	1992	
"Gorgeous"	Jagged Little Pill 20th Anniversary Collector's edition (Demos)	Morissette	1995	
"Guru"	Havoc and Bright Lights (Target edition bonus track)	Morissette	2012	
"Hand in My Pocket"	Jagged Little Pill	Morissette, Glen Ballard	1995	
"Hands Clean"	Under Rug Swept	Morissette	2002	
"Havoc"	Havoc and Bright Lights	Morissette	2012	
"Head Over Feet"	Jagged Little Pill	Morissette, Glen Ballard	1995	
"Heart of the House"	Supposed Former Infatuation Junkie	Morissette	1998	
"Her"	Such Pretty Forks in the Road	Morissette, Michael Farrell	2019	
"Human Touch"	Alanis	Morissette, Leslie Howe, Louise Reny, Frank Levin	1991	
"I Was Hoping"	Supposed Former Infatuation Junkie	Morissette	1998	
"In Praise of the Vulnerable Man"	Flavors of Entanglement	Morissette	2008	
"Incomplete"	Flavors of Entanglement	Morissette	2008	
"Into A King"	Big Sur 7"	Morissette	2011	
"Ironic"	Jagged Little Pill	Morissette	1995	
"It's a Bitch to Grow Up"	Flavors of Entanglement	Morissette	2008	
"Jealous"	Alanis	Morissette, Leslie Howe, Serge Côté	1991	
"Jekyll and Hyde"	Havoc and Bright Lights (iTunes deluxe edition bonus track)	Morissette	2012	
"Joining You"	Supposed Former Infatuation Junkie	Morissette	1998	
"King of Intimidation"	Jagged Little Pill 20th Anniversary Collector's edition (Demos)	Morissette	1995	
"King of Pain"	MTV Unplugged	Sting	1999	
"Knees of My Bees"	So-Called Chaos	Morissette	2004	
"Lens"	Havoc and Bright Lights	Morissette	2012	
"Let's Do It (Let's Fall in Love)"	The Collection	Cole Porter	2005	
"Limbo No More"	Flavors of Entanglement (Deluxe edition)	Morissette	2008	
"London"	Jagged Little Pill 20th Anniversary Collector's edition (Demos)	Morissette	1995	
"Losing The Plot"	Such Pretty Forks in the Road	Morissette, Michael Farrell	2019	
"Madness"	Flavors of Entanglement (Deluxe edition)	Morissette	2008	
"Magical Child"	Havoc and Bright Lights (Deluxe edition)	Morissette	2012	
"Mary Jane"	Jagged Little Pill	Morissette	1995	
"Missing The Miracle"	Such Pretty Forks in the Road	Morissette, Michael Farrell	2019	
"Moratorium"	Flavors of Entanglement	Morissette	2008	
"Narcissus"	Under Rug Swept	Morissette	2002	
"Nemesis"	Such Pretty Forks in the Road	Morissette, Michael Farrell	2019	
"No"	Havoc and Bright Lights (Japanese edition bonus track)	Morissette	2012	
"No Apologies"	Now Is The Time	Morissette, Leslie Howe and Serge Côté	1992	
"No Avalon"	Jagged Little Pill 20th Anniversary Collector's edition (Demos)	Morissette	1995	
"No Pressure Over Cappuccino"	MTV Unplugged	Morissette, Nick Lashley	1999	
"Not All Me"	So-Called Chaos	Morissette	2004	
"Not as We"	Flavors of Entanglement	Morissette	2008	
"Not the Doctor"	Jagged Little Pill	Morissette	1995	
"Numb"	Havoc and Bright Lights	Morissette	2012	
"Offer"	Feast on Scraps	Morissette	2002	
"Oh Yeah!"	Alanis	Morissette, Leslie Howe	1991	
"On My Own"	Alanis	Morissette, Leslie Howe, Serge Côté	1991	
"On the Tequila"	Flavors of Entanglement (Deluxe edition)	Morissette	2008	
"One"	Supposed Former Infatuation Junkie	Morissette	1998	
"Orchid"	Flavors of Entanglement (Deluxe edition)	Morissette	2008	
"Out Is Through"	So-Called Chaos	Morissette	2004	
"Party Boy"	Alanis	Morissette, Leslie Howe	1991	
"Pedestal"	Such Pretty Forks in the Road	Morissette, Michael Farrell	2019	
"Perfect"	Jagged Little Pill	Morissette, Glen Ballard	1995	
"Permission"	Havoc and Bright Lights (Target edition bonus track)	Morissette	2012	
"Plastic"	Alanis	Morissette, Leslie Howe, Serge Côté	1991	
"Pollyanna Flower"	Thank U single (bonus track)	Morissette	1998	
"Precious Illusions"	Under Rug Swept	Morissette	2002	
"Princes Familiar"	MTV Unplugged	Morissette	1999	
"Purgatorying"	Feast on Scraps	Morissette	2002	
"Rain"	Now Is the Time	Morissette	1992	
"Real World"	Now Is the Time	Morissette	1992	
"Reasons I Drink"	Such Pretty Forks in the Road	Morissette, Michael Farrell	2019	
"Receive"	Havoc and Bright Lights	Morissette	2012	
"Reckoning"	Such Pretty Forks in the Road	Morissette, Michael Farrell	2019	
"Right Through You"	Jagged Little Pill	Morissette, Glen Ballard	1995	
"Sandbox Love"	Such Pretty Forks in the Road	Morissette, Michael Farrell	2019	
"Simple Together"	Feast on Scraps	Morissette	2002	
"Sister Blister"	Under Rug Swept (Japanese edition bonus track)	Morissette	2002	
"Smiling"	Such Pretty Forks in the Road	Morissette, Michael Farrell	2019	
"So-Called Chaos"	So-Called Chaos	Morissette	2004	
"So Pure"	Supposed Former Infatuation Junkie	Morissette	1998	
"So Unsexy"	Under Rug Swept	Morissette	2002	
"Sorry 2 Myself"	Under Rug Swept (Japanese edition bonus track)	Morissette	2002	
"Spineless"	So-Called Chaos	Morissette	2004	
"Spiral"	Havoc and Bright Lights	Morissette	2012	
"Straitjacket"	Flavors of Entanglement	Morissette	2008	
"Still"	Dogma: Music from the Motion Picture	Morissette	1999	
"Superman"	Alanis	Morissette, Leslie Howe	1991	
"Superstar Wonderful Weirdos"	Jagged Little Pill 20th Anniversary Collector's edition (Demos)	Morissette, Glen Ballard, Terrance Sawchuk	1995	
"Surrendering"	Under Rug Swept	Morissette	2002	
"Sympathetic Character"	Supposed Former Infatuation Junkie	Morissette	1998	
"Symptoms"	Hands Clean (European single)	Morissette	2002	
"Tantra"	Havoc and Bright Lights (Amazon bonus track)	Morissette	2012	
"Tapes"	Flavors of Entanglement	Morissette	2008	
"That I Would Be Good"	Supposed Former Infatuation Junkie	Morissette	1998	
"That Particular Time"	Under Rug Swept	Morissette	2002	
"Thank U"	Supposed Former Infatuation Junkie	Morissette, Glen Ballard	1998	
"The Bottom Line"	Jagged Little Pill 20th Anniversary Collector's edition (Demos)	Morissette	1995	
"The Couch"	Supposed Former Infatuation Junkie	Morissette	1998	
"The Guy Who Leaves"	Flavors of Entanglement (Deluxe edition)	Morissette	2008	
"The Time of Your Life"	Now Is the Time	Morissette	1992	
"These R the Thoughts"	MTV Unplugged	Morissette	1999	
"This Grudge"	So-Called Chaos	Morissette	2004	
"'Til You"	Havoc and Bright Lights	Morissette	2012	
"Too Hot"	Alanis	Morissette, Leslie Howe	1991	
"Torch"	Flavors of Entanglement	Morissette	2008	
"Underneath"	Flavors of Entanglement	Morissette, Guy Sigsworth	2008	
"Unprodigal Daughter"	Feast on Scraps	Morissette	2002	
"Uninvited"	City of Angels (soundtrack)	Morissette	1998	
"Unsent"	Supposed Former Infatuation Junkie	Morissette, Glen Ballard	1998	
"UR"	Supposed Former Infatuation Junkie	Morissette	1998	
"Utopia"	Under Rug Swept	Morissette	2002	
"Versions of Violence"	Flavors of Entanglement	Morissette	2008	
"Wake Up	Jagged Little Pill	Morissette, Glen Ballard	1995	
"Walk Away"	Alanis	Morissette, Leslie Howe, Louise Reny, Frank Levin	1991	
"When We Meet Again"	Now Is the Time	Morissette	1992	
"Will You Be My Girlfriend?"	Havoc and Bright Lights (Deluxe edition)	Morissette	2012	
"Win and Win"	Havoc and Bright Lights	Morissette	2012	
"Woman Down"	Havoc and Bright Lights	Morissette	2012	
"Would Not Come"	Supposed Former Infatuation Junkie	Morissette	1998	
"You Learn"	Jagged Little Pill	Morissette, Glen Ballard	1995	
"You Oughta Know"	Jagged Little Pill	Morissette, Glen Ballard	1995	
"You Owe Me Nothing in Return"	Under Rug Swept	Morissette	2002	
"Your Congratulations"	Supposed Former Infatuation Junkie	Morissette	1998	
"Your House"	Jagged Little Pill (hidden track)	Morissette, Glen Ballard	1995	

== Other songs performed ==
- "Mercy" (from The Prayer Cycle) – Alanis Morissette and Salif Keita
- "Hope" (from The Prayer Cycle) – Alanis Morissette, Devin Provenzano, and The American Boychoir
- "Innocence" (from The Prayer Cycle) – Alanis Morissette and Salif Keita
- "Faith"(from The Prayer Cycle) – Alanis Morissette and Nusrat Fateh Ali Khan
- "Arrival" (from What About Me? by 1 Giant Leap) – Alanis Morissette, Eugene Hütz, Al Tanbura & Aida Samb
- "Wunderkind" (for The Chronicles of Narnia: The Lion, the Witch and the Wardrobe soundtrack)
- "I Remain" (for Prince of Persia: The Sands of Time soundtrack)
- "Professional Torturer" (for 2010 Radio Free Albemuth film soundtrack)
- "The Morning" (for A Small Section of the World 2014 documentary film)
- "My Humps" (parody cover of My Humps by The Black Eyed Peas)
- "Today" (for the political campaign of Marianne Williamson)

== Unreleased songs ==
- "Pray for Peace"
- "Finally Acknowledgment" (So-Called Chaos Sessions)
