= An Emotion Away =

- Promotional material

Single by Alanis Morissette

from the album Now Is the Time
- B-side: "When We Meet Again"
- Released: November 25, 1992
- Studio: Distortion Studios, Ottawa
- Genre: Dance-pop
- Length: 4:14
- Label: MCA (MCACS54527)
- Songwriters: Alanis Morissette; Leslie Howe; Serge Côté
- Producer: Leslie Howe

Alanis Morissette singles chronology
| "Feel Your Love" (1991) | "An Emotion Away" (1992) | "No Apologies" (1993) |

"An Emotion Away" is a pop-dance song co-written by Alanis Morissette, Leslie Howe and Serge Côté, and produced by Howe for Morissette's second album Now Is the Time (1992). Its protagonist tells someone who "completely took [her] heart by surprise" that "love is just an emotion away". It was released as the album's first single in 1992 (see 1992 in music) and reached number twenty-four on the Canadian singles chart. "An Emotion Away" was the most successful single from Now Is the Time, which sold moderately. Leslie Howe engineered and mixed the song. The B-side on the cassette single was "When We Meet Again", another track from Now Is the Time.

The song, along with "Too Hot" and "Feel Your Love" (from Morissette's 1991 debut album Alanis), was used on the soundtrack of the 1993 film Just One of the Girls, in which Morissette appeared.

== Music video ==
A music video was produced to promote the single, and was filmed in Rome, Italy. Canadian actor Evan Sabba appeared in it. The video begins with Alanis watching a black-and-white 1940s mock noir crime film, with Alanis portraying a character herself in it. Alanis then flicks the channel, and appears on the television - ecstatic, dancing dressed in a suit and hat, jumping and dancing around, and singing the song. Several times in the video, we see Alanis 'outside' readjusting her position on the seat, or providing amused facial expressions. A 'commercial' is also embedded into the television, advertising a perfume - also featuring Alanis.
