= Too Hot (Alanis Morissette song) =

- Canadian commercial cassette release

Single by Alanis Morissette

from the album Alanis
- B-side: "Too Hot (Hott Shot Mix)"
- Released: May 1991
- Studio: Distortion Studios, Ottawa
- Genre: Dance-pop; new jack swing
- Length: 4:00
- Label: MCA; MCA 129120
- Songwriters: Alanis Morissette; Leslie Howe
- Producer: Leslie Howe

Alanis Morissette singles chronology
"Fate Stay with Me" (1987)	"Too Hot" (1991)	"Walk Away" (1991)

"Too Hot" is a song by the Canadian singer-songwriter Alanis Morissette from her debut studio album, Alanis (1991). Morissette wrote it with its producer, Leslie Howe. MCA Records released it as the album's lead single in May 1991.

== Content and history ==
The song is driven by drum machines, electronic keyboards and a guitar, and Morissette's brothers Chad and Wade provided some of the backing vocals. In the chorus the song's protagonist tells a boy aspiring towards a goal that he's "Always too hot" and "never too cold", adding that his "best shot" is "too hot to hold"; with this in mind, she urges him to "go for gold". The fifth chorus is sung almost a cappella. Morissette performs the first part of each verse as a rap, with lyrics describing the consequences of her "baby" achieving his goal. After the first chorus a man's voice says "I know you gonna dig this ... Ch-check this out", and more men's voices (one of whom addresses the "party people in the house") appear during the song's bridge, in which the backing singers shout for the listener to nonchalantly wave their arms around in the air.

Morissette had independently released a single, "Fate Stay with Me", in 1985, but "Too Hot" became her mainstream breakthrough in Canada; it reached number 14 on the country's singles chart, peaked within the top ten on contemporary hit radio and contributed to the success of the album Alanis, which was certified gold during the same period. It is her most popular dance-pop release, and was her biggest hit in Canada until the singles from her international debut album Jagged Little Pill (1995). It was not released elsewhere.

At the 1992 Juno Awards, "Too Hot" received a nomination for "Single of the Year", and the song's "Hott Shot" remix was nominated in the category of "Best Dance Recording".

CBC called the song "Paula Abdul-inspired", and the Arizona Daily Wildcat described it as "cheesy" and "poppy". "Too Hot", along with "Feel Your Love" (another song from Alanis) and "An Emotion Away" (from Morissette's 1992 second album Now Is the Time), was used on the soundtrack of the 1993 film Just One of the Girls, in which Morissette appeared. She performed an acoustic version of the song during her 2005 Jagged Little Pill Acoustic concert tour, introducing the song with the statement "For those 16-year-old days".

== Music video ==
The single's video was shot in Los Angeles, California, and intercuts scenes featuring Morissette and others dancing at night with black-and-white footage of her loitering, flirting, streetwalking and dancing with friends during the day. The Toronto Sun noted Morissette's "big hair" in the video.

== Track listings ==
Cassette single

- Side A:
1. "Too Hot" (album version) - 3:58
2. Album sampler: "Feel Your Love"/"Walk Away"/"Plastic"
- Side B:
1. "Too Hot" (Hott Shot mix) - 4:54

12-inch promo

1. "Too Hot" (Hott Shot mix) - 4:54
2. "Too Hot" (instrumental) - 3:58

CD promo

1. "Too Hot" (album version) - 3:58
2. "Too Hot" (Hott Shot mix) - 4:54

== Personnel ==
- Produced, engineered and mixed by Leslie Howe for Ghetto Records
- Keyboards by Serge Côté
- Drum programming, guitar and additional keyboards by Leslie "Bud" Howe
- Keyboard solo by Frank "Fish" Levin
- Lead vocals by Alanis Morissette
- Back-up vocals by Chad & Wade Morissette, Tyley Ross, John & Peter (The "Burn Bros."), Tom "Sloppy" Saidak, Kevin "Iceman" Little, Dan "Capt. Pin", Deane Josh Lovejoy, Sean Daley, Jenny "Frank #1" Parlier, Mr. Fish, Sal, Rick "Slick" Kumar
- Recorded at Distortion Studios in Ottawa, Ontario, Canada

== Charts ==
Chart (1991)	Peak position
Canada Top Singles (RPM)	14
Canada Dance/Urban (RPM)	8
