= Feel Your Love =

- Promotional material

Single by Alanis Morissette

from the album Alanis
- Released: September 1991
- Studio: Distortion Studios, Ottawa
- Genre: Pop; dance; new jack swing
- Length: 3:40 (album version); 4:15 (Re-release version)
- Label: MCA (129179)
- Songwriter(s): Alanis Morissette; Leslie Howe
- Producer(s): Leslie Howe

Alanis Morissette singles chronology
"Walk Away" (1991)	"Feel Your Love" (1991)	"An Emotion Away" (1992)

"Feel Your Love" is a pop-dance and new jack swing song co-written by Alanis Morissette and Leslie Howe, and produced by Howe for Morissette's debut album, Alanis (1991). Its protagonist tells a boy she has "got this thing" for him, and that "it's drivin' me right out of my mind ... I wanna feel your love; you know this waitin' for you boy I can't stand". Morissette's brothers Chad and Wade provided some of the song's backing vocals. It was released as the album's third and final single in 1991 (see 1991 in music) and was the second commercial single release after "Too Hot". The single charted at number 24 in Canada.

"Feel Your Love", along with "Too Hot" and "An Emotion Away" (from Morissette's 1992 second album Now Is the Time), was used on the soundtrack of the 1993 film Just One of the Girls, in which Morissette appeared.

== Music video ==
The single's video, like the videos for the album's previous singles, features Morissette dancing.

== Track listing ==
CD Promo

1. "Feel Your Love" (Bad Dawg Remix)
2. "Feel Your Love" (Album Version)
3. "Feel Your Love" (Big Bad Dawg Remix)
4. "Feel Your Love" (Muzzle Mix)

== Personnel ==
- Produced, engineered and mixed by Leslie Howe for Ghetto Records
- Keyboards by Serge Côté
- Drum programming, guitar and additional keyboards by Leslie "Bud" Howe
- All vocals by Alanis Morissette
- Back-up vocals by Chad & Wade Morissette, Tyley Ross, John & Peter (The "Burn Bros."), Tom "Sloppy" Saidak, Kevin "Iceman" Little, Dan "Capt. Pin", Deane Josh Lovejoy, Sean Daley, Jenny "Frank #1" Parlier, Mr. Fish, Sal, Rick "Slick" Kumar.
- Recorded at Distortion Studios in Ottawa, Ontario, Canada
