= The Collection (Alanis Morissette album) =

Greatest hits album by Alanis Morissette
- Released: November 15, 2005 (U.S.)
- Recorded: 1994–2005
- Genre: Alternative rock; pop rock
- Length: 75:45
- Label: Maverick; Warner Bros.
- Producer: Various

Alanis Morissette chronology
Jagged Little Pill Acoustic (2005)	The Collection (2005)	Flavors of Entanglement (2008)

Singles from The Collection
- 1. "Crazy" Released: November 8, 2005

Professional ratings
Review scores
Source	Rating
AllMusic	4/5 stars
Blender	3.5/5 stars

The Collection is a greatest hits compilation album by Canadian-American singer-songwriter Alanis Morissette, released in the United States on 15 November 2005. It comprises material from 1995 to 2005, with some soundtrack selections and a cover of Seal's "Crazy". A limited edition release, which included a DVD, followed on 6 December 2005.

As of March 2012, the album has sold 401,000 copies in the United States and more than 1,000,000 worldwide.

== Track listing ==
All lyrics are written by Alanis Morissette, except "Crazy" by Seal Henry Samuel; "Let's Do It (Let's Fall in Love)" by Cole Porter.

CD
No.	Title	Music	Length
1.	"Thank U" (from Supposed Former Infatuation Junkie, 1998)	Morissette, Glen Ballard	4:18
2.	"Head over Feet" (from Jagged Little Pill, 1995)	Morissette, Ballard	4:24
3.	"8 Easy Steps" (from So-Called Chaos, 2004)	Morissette	2:52
4.	"Everything" (from So-Called Chaos, 2004)	Morissette	4:34
5.	"Crazy" (Seal cover)	Seal Henry Samuel, Guy Sigsworth	3:39
6.	"Ironic" (from Jagged Little Pill, 1995)	Morissette, Ballard	3:48
7.	"Princes Familiar" (from MTV Unplugged, 1999)	Morissette, Ballard	4:34
8.	"You Learn" (from Jagged Little Pill, 1995)	Morissette, Ballard	3:59
9.	"Simple Together" (from Feast on Scraps, 2002)	Morissette	4:48
10.	"You Oughta Know" (from Jagged Little Pill, 1995)	Morissette, Ballard	4:08
11.	"That I Would Be Good" (from Supposed Former Infatuation Junkie, 1998)	Morissette, Ballard	4:17
12.	"Sister Blister" (from Feast on Scraps, 2002)	Morissette	4:12
13.	"Hands Clean" (from Under Rug Swept, 2002)	Morissette	4:33
14.	"Mercy" (from The Prayer Cycle, 1999)	Jonathan Elias	3:44
15.	"Still" (from Dogma soundtrack, 1999)	Morissette	6:17
16.	"Uninvited" (from City of Angels: Music from the Motion Picture, 1998)	Morissette	4:36
17.	"Let's Do It (Let's Fall in Love)" (from De-Lovely soundtrack, 2004)	Cole Porter	3:23
18.	"Hand in My Pocket" (from Jagged Little Pill, 1995)	Morissette, Ballard	3:39
Total length:			75:45

iTunes Store bonus track
No.	Title	Length
19.	"So Unsexy" (Vancouver Sessions 2004)	5:05

DVD
No.	Title	Length
1.	"Jagged Little Pill"
2.	"Supposed Former Infatuation Junkie"
3.	"Dogma"
4.	"The Prayer Cycle"
5.	"MTV Unplugged"
6.	"The One Tour"
7.	"Under Rug Swept"
8.	"Feast on Scraps"
9.	"De-Lovely"
10.	"So-Called Chaos"
11.	"Service in Other Forms"
12.	"The Awards"
13.	"Jagged Little Pill Acoustic"
14.	"Final Gratitude"
15.	"King Of Intimidation" (Live from Jagged Little Pill Tour 1996)
16.	"Can't Not" (Live from Jagged Little Pill Tour 1996)
17.	"Your House" (Live from Jagged Little Pill Acoustic Tour 2005)
18.	"Ironic"
19.	"Alanis' Tour Books"
20.	"Alanis' Tour Photos"
21.	"Alanis' All Access Passes"

== Charts ==
=== Weekly charts ===
Chart (2005)	Peak position
Australian Albums (ARIA)	110
Austrian Albums (Ö3 Austria)	12
Belgian Albums (Ultratop Flanders)	44
Belgian Albums (Ultratop Wallonia)	11
Danish Albums (Hitlisten)	17
Dutch Albums (Album Top 100)	49
German Albums (Offizielle Top 100)	18
Irish Albums (IRMA)	41
Italian Albums (FIMI)	16
Japanese Albums (Oricon)	78
Norwegian Albums (VG-lista)	6
Portuguese Albums (AFP)	5
Scottish Albums (OCC)	40
Spanish Albums (PROMUSICAE)	64
Swiss Albums (Schweizer Hitparade)	9
UK Albums (OCC)	44
US Billboard 200	51

Chart (2025)	Peak position
Irish Albums (OCC)	31

=== Year-end charts ===
Chart (2005)	Position
Belgian Albums (Ultratop Wallonia)	97

== Certifications ==
Region	Certification	Certified units/sales
Denmark (IFPI Danmark)	Gold	20,000^{^}
Germany (BVMI)	Gold	100,000^{^}
Portugal (AFP)	Gold	10,000^{^}
United Kingdom (BPI)	Platinum	300,000^{‡}
United States	—	401,000
^{^} Shipments figures based on certification alone.^{‡} Sales+streaming figures based on certification alone.
