= Artificial Joy Club =

Canadian alternative rock band

- Also known as: Sal's Birdland
- Origin: Ottawa, Ontario, Canada
- Genre: Alternative rock
- Years active: 1993–1999
- Labels: Crunchy Records, Interscope, Ghetto Records, Discovery Records
- Spinoff of: One to One
- Past members: Louise Reny; Leslie Howe; Michael Goyette; Tim Dupont; Andrew Lamarche

Artificial Joy Club was a Canadian alternative rock band active in the 1990s. The group recorded three albums under various names and had one hit single.

== History ==
The band formed in 1993 when Louise Reny and Leslie Howe, formerly of the pop group One to One, joined with guitarist Michael Goyette, bassist Tim Dupont and drummer Andrew Lamarche. Initially taking the name Sal's Birdland ('Sal' was Reny's stage name), the group released its debut album, So Very Happy, in 1994.

In 1995, the group signed an international deal with Discovery Records, which re-worked So Very Happy with production assistance from Michael James and released the album Nude Photos Inside.

The label rejected their planned follow-up, and the band signed to Interscope Records, changing their name to Artificial Joy Club at the same time. Goyette, Dupont and Lamarche had previously used the name Artificial Joy Club for a short-lived side project with Ottawa singer Doug Wilson.

In 1997, they released the album Melt, and the maxi-single Sick And Beautiful. The song "Sick and Beautiful" was a No. 17 Billboard Modern Rock Tracks hit; it also climbed to No. 11 on the Radio and Records Alternative chart. It hit #35 in Canada on the RPM Top 100. It was also featured on the soundtrack for the 1998 film Homegrown.

The band then went on a full North American festival tour. It included opening the mainstage at Buzzfest '97, and appearing on the second stage bill at Lollapalooza.

In 1998, Artificial Joy Club released the three-track EP Spaceman, which was three versions of their song of the same name. They also released a video. The band broke up in 1999.

== Discography ==
=== As Sal's Birdland ===
- So Very Happy (1994), Ghetto Records
- Nude Photos Inside (1995), Ghetto Records, Discovery Records

=== As Artificial Joy Club ===
- Melt (1997), Interscope
- Sick And Beautiful (1997), Interscope, Crunchy Records
- Spaceman (EP) (1998), Interscope
