= One to One (band) =

Canadian pop music duo

- Also known as: One 2 One
- Origin: Ottawa, Ontario, Canada
- Genres: Dance, Pop, Adult Contemporary
- Years active: 1984–1992
- Labels: Bonaire Records (1985–1989); A&M Records (1992)
- Members: Leslie Howe; Louise Reny

One to One was a Canadian pop music group formed in 1984 in Ottawa, Ontario. They later changed their name to One 2 One. The duo released three albums and produced ten hits on Canadian charts between 1985 and 1992.

== Biography ==
Consisting of vocalist Louise Reny and producer Leslie Howe, One to One evolved out of an Ottawa Valley band called Mainstream, which had toured the local circuit in the late 1970s and early 1980s performing cover songs. In 1983, Reny and Howe decided to strike out on their own, and after recording a few demos, they signed a two-album deal with Bonaire Records, and flew to West Germany to record.

The dance-fueled debut Forward Your Emotions was released in 1985 and became a smash hit across Canada. The singles "There Was a Time" and "Angel in My Pocket" charted on the Canadian Top 40, and the latter also became a minor hit on the American Billboard Hot 100 charts, reaching #92. A third single, "Black on White", only reached #90 on the Canadian music charts.

Their 1988 follow-up, 1-2-1, was a more guitar-based pop album that also became a hit in Canada. The hits "Hold Me Now" and "Do You Believe" climbed into the Canadian Top 40. Two more singles, a cover of The Supremes' "Love Child" and "We've Got the Power", became modest hits as well.

Following the demise of Bonaire Records, the group signed to A&M Records with a new look & sound as One 2 One. Released in 1992, Imagine It was a light 1960s/adult contemporary-based album that gave the band another hit with "Peace of Mind (Love Goes On)". That song also charted on the American Billboard charts at #95. Two more singles, "Memory Lane" and "Friends", reached the Canadian music Top 40 as well.

Following this success, Howe and Reny decided to pursue a different musical direction, and joined with three other musicians in the alternative rock band Sal's Birdland, which later morphed into Artificial Joy Club. The song "Sick and Beautiful" from their debut album Melt went to #1 on the Canadian music Top 40; it also peaked at #11 on the US Radio and Records Alternative chart.

In January 2010, Forward Your Emotions was re-released internationally by Wounded Bird Records.

== Awards and recognition ==
In 1986, the band was nominated for three Juno Awards:

- Most Promising Group of the Year
- Producer of the Year (Leslie Howe)
- Recording Engineer of the Year (Leslie Howe)

Howe served as producer for Alanis Morissette's debut album Alanis, which was only released in her native Canada, as well as Ontario based hip hop duo Mix Breed.

== Discography ==
=== Albums ===
| Year | Album |
|---|---|
| 1985 | Forward Your Emotions |
| 1988 | 1-2-1 |
| 1992 | Imagine It |

=== Singles ===
| Year | Single | CAN | US |
|---|---|---|---|
| 1986 | "There Was a Time" | 14 | -- |
| 1986 | "Angel in My Pocket" | 24 | 92 |
| 1986 | "Black on White" | 90 | -- |
| 1988 | "Hold Me Now" | 13 | -- |
| 1989 | "Love Child" | 43 | -- |
| 1989 | "Do You Believe" | 34 | -- |
| 1989 | "We've Got the Power" | 90 | -- |
| 1992 | "Peace of Mind (Love Goes On)" | 11 | 95 |
| 1992 | "Memory Lane" | 34 | -- |
| 1992 | "Friends" | 36 | -- |
