= You Oughta Know =

1995 single by Alanis Morissette

Single by Alanis Morissette

from the album Jagged Little Pill
- B-side: "Perfect" (acoustic version); "Wake Up"
- Released: July 10, 1995
- Recorded: June 1994 – February 1995
- Length: 4:09
- Label: Maverick; Reprise
- Songwriters: Alanis Morissette; Glen Ballard
- Producer: Glen Ballard

Alanis Morissette singles chronology
"(Change Is) Never a Waste of Time" (1993)	"You Oughta Know" (1995)	"You Learn" (1995)

Music video
- "You Oughta Know" on YouTube

"You Oughta Know" is a song by Canadian singer-songwriter Alanis Morissette and the second track on her third studio album, Jagged Little Pill (1995). It was released in July 1995 by Maverick as the album's lead single. After releasing two studio albums, Morissette met producer Glen Ballard in Los Angeles, with whom she wrote songs including "You Oughta Know". Despite much speculation concerning whom the song is about, Morissette has never disclosed the person's identity and has never indicated an intention to do so.

"You Oughta Know" was praised by critics for its lyrics, music, and Morissette's vocals. The song was a commercial success, reaching the top ten in three countries and the top 40 in six other countries; Morissette also held the record for longest run by a woman atop the Billboard Alternative Airplay chart until 2013. (Note: At the time, it was known as the Billboard Modern Rock Tracks chart.) "You Oughta Know" won the Grammy Awards for Best Rock Song and Best Female Rock Vocal Performance, and the Juno Award for Single of the Year. Nick Egan directed the song's music video.

"You Oughta Know" helped Morissette enter the mainstream, and is often ranked among the best songs of the 1990s and of all-time. The song has continued to inspire other artists, many of whom have covered it in live performances. It also appears on three of Morissette's compilation albums.

== Background ==
In 1991, MCA Records Canada released Morissette's debut studio album Alanis, which went platinum in Canada. This was followed by her second album, Now Is the Time, which was a commercial failure, selling only a little more than half the copies of her first album. With her two-album deal with MCA Records Canada complete, Morissette was left without a major label contract. In 1993, Morissette's publisher Leeds Levy at MCA Music Publishing introduced her to manager Scott Welch. Welch told HitQuarters he was impressed by her "spectacular voice", her character, and her lyrics. At the time she was still living with her parents. Together they decided it would be best for her career to move to Toronto and start writing with other people.

After graduating from high school, Morissette moved from Ottawa to Toronto. Her publisher funded part of her development and when she met producer and songwriter Glen Ballard, he believed in her talent enough to let her use his studio. The two wrote and recorded Morissette's first internationally released album, Jagged Little Pill, and by the spring of 1995, she had signed a deal with Maverick Records. According to Welch, every label they had approached had passed on Morissette apart from Maverick.

== Recording ==
Ballard met Morissette on March 8, 1994, after his publishing company matched them up. According to Ballard, the connection was "instant", and within 30 minutes of meeting each other, they had begun experimenting with different sounds in Ballard's home studio in San Fernando Valley, California. Ballard also declared to Rolling Stone, "I just connected with her as a person, and, almost parenthetically, it was like 'Wow, you're 19?' She was so intelligent and ready to take a chance on doing something that might have no commercial application. Although there was some question about what she wanted to do musically, she knew what she didn't want to do, which was anything that wasn't authentic and from her heart."

"You Oughta Know" was co-written by Morissette and Ballard. Morissette stated that she wrote the song from her "subconscious": "I wasn't aware of what was coming out of me. I'd go into the booth when the ink wasn't even dry and sing. I'd listen the next day and not really remember it." The demo was recorded on November 28, 1994, and additional vocals were recorded on November 30. Initial rhythm recording began with Los Angeles engineer Chris Fogel on December 1, 1994. Matt Laug played drums and Lance Morrison played bass. On December 5, Benmont Tench of Tom Petty and the Heartbreakers recorded Hammond organ. Additional guitars were recorded on December 9.

In early 1995, producer Jimmy Boyle recruited guitarist Dave Navarro and bassist Flea of Red Hot Chili Peppers to play on the track. According to Navarro, "There were no guide tracks, we just had the vocal to work from.... and we basically jammed until we found something we were both happy with. Alanis was happy too." Flea said, "When I first heard the track, it had a different bassist and guitarist on it; I listened to the bassline and thought, 'That's some weak shit!' It was no flash and no smash! But the vocal was strong, so I just tried to play something good."

Two mixes of the song appear on Jagged Little Pill. Track 2 was mixed by Chris Fogel, and is the most widely known version of the song. Track 13 is the "Jimmy the Saint Blend" and was mixed by Jimmy Boyle and it was only used in the original music video from 1995, replaced in 2020 by the Chris Fogel mix.

== Lyrics ==
"You Oughta Know"
The song has an aggressive tone and piercing vocals.

Morissette has never publicly identified anyone as the ex-boyfriend portrayed in the song. In 2008, she said,

Well, I've never talked about who my songs were about and I won't, because when I write them they're written for the sake of personal expression. So with all due respect to whoever may see themselves in my songs, and it happens all the time, I never really comment on it because I write these songs for myself, not other people.

Nonetheless, on different occasions, actor-comedian Dave Coulier has alternately admitted to and denied being the subject of the song. In 1997, the Boston Herald reported that Coulier "admitted the lines are very close to home. Especially the one about 'an older version of me' and bugging him [Coulier] 'in the middle of dinner.'" Coulier's former television co-star Bob Saget said in one interview that he was present when Morissette made such a call during dinner. In the 2021 documentary Jagged, Morissette denied the song is about Coulier.

Other celebrities have been rumored to be the lover in the song, including: Mike Peluso, hockey player for the New Jersey Devils; Doug Gilmour, a hockey player; Matt LeBlanc, the actor who appeared in the video for Morissette's single "Walk Away" in 1991; and Leslie Howe, a musician and the producer of Morissette's first two albums in the early 1990s.

== Release ==
Maverick Records released Jagged Little Pill internationally in 1995. The album was expected only to sell enough for Morissette to make a follow-up, but the situation changed quickly when KROQ-FM, an influential Los Angeles modern rock radio station, began playing "You Oughta Know", which was released as the album's first single. The single was added in the set list for Morissette's concert tour, Jagged Little Pill World Tour (1995). The song was added to the tour's video album Jagged Little Pill Live (1997).

Since then, "You Oughta Know" has been included in Morissette's albums MTV Unplugged (1999), Feast on Scraps (2002), and The Collection, as well as 1997 Grammys and the MTV Unplugged compilation albums.

== Music video ==
Directed by Nick Egan and produced by Mark Fetterman, the accompanying music video for the track was filmed in Death Valley. In the video, Morissette aggressively runs around the desert landscape and sings into a microphone on a mock-up stage with her then band-members performing, including Taylor Hawkins. Throughout the video, Morissette switches from a short black dress to a white shirt, jeans and coat, to a blue silk shirt in the climax – all signifying her change in image.

In 2024, to promote Morissette's Triple Moon Tour with Joan Jett, DJ Cummerbund produced the mashup "Hate Myself for Loving You Oughta Know," combining Morissette's You Oughta Know with Joan Jett's "I Hate Myself for Loving You," and including a snippet of "I Love Rock 'n' Roll."

== Reception ==
=== Critical response ===
Upon release, "You Oughta Know" garnered attention for its scathing lyrics and met with positive reviews from critics. Stephen Thomas Erlewine of AllMusic praised the song's "vengeful" lyrics and stated that the song propelled the album's success and encouraged the public to embrace the "women in rock" movement. Steve Baltin from Cash Box wrote that here, the singer "comes out of the box with the same scintillating sensuality that marked Sophie B. Hawkins' coming out song, 'Damn, I Wish I Was Your Lover'. When the 20-year old Morissette sings, 'Are you thinking of me when you fuck her', ears can't help but stand up at attention. The brilliantly emotive song is sung with just the right blend of anger and passion." David Browne of Entertainment Weekly also praised the single's lyrical content, calling them "spiteful and seething", and continues by saying that Morissette was able to turn "jealous bile into something worth hearing." Chuck Campbell from Knoxville News Sentinel felt it "promises to be one of the year's most memorable songs", remarking that it "belongs to Morissette, who builds to a rage-filled chorus". He added, "Her stunned reaction to being unceremoniously dumped may belie her age (21), but jilted souls of all ages can connect with the bitterness."

A reviewer from Music & Media commented, "Jeez, this woman is really cross. Her man has walked away with 'another', and she can't hide that jealousy, which is stirred by a mean beat and an aggressively rocking wah guitar." British magazine Music Week gave it three out of five, adding, "The Canadian songstress shows startling maturity for her years, and this debut single from her album Jagged Little Pill is made all the stronger by guests Flea and Dave Navarro of the Chili Peppers." David Sinclair from The Times wrote, "The arrangement bustles along, thanks to the rugged bass and guitar-playing (...), gradually building to a knockout punch of a chorus. But the song's tremendous thrust derives primarily from Morissette herself as she nails down a rapid succession of home truths with vengeful enthusiasm."

=== Commercial performance ===
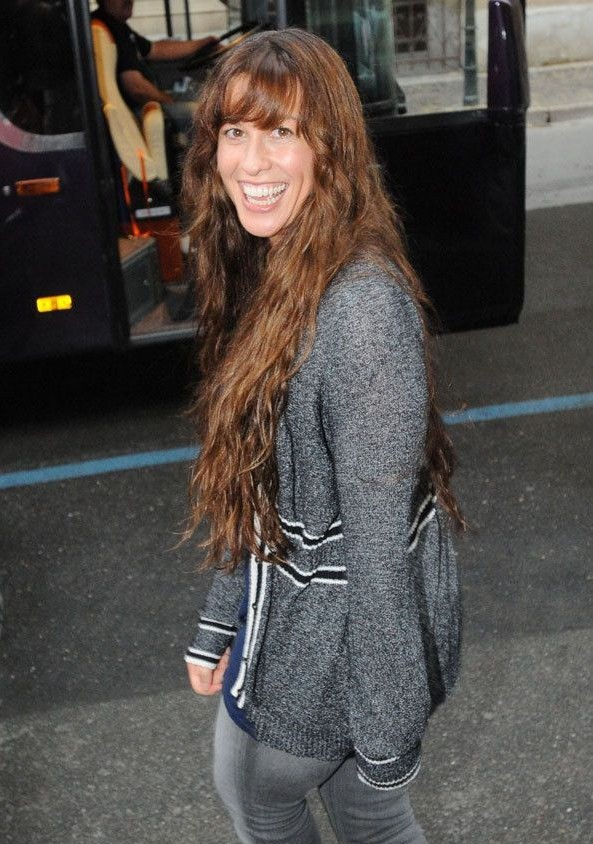
Morissette held the record for longest run by a woman atop the Billboard Modern Rock Tracks chart, which was later surpassed by Lorde's "Royals" in 2013, after the chart had been renamed to Alternative Songs.

The song was only a modest hit in Morissette's native Canada at first, initially reaching number 20 on the RPM 100 Hit Tracks chart and number 21 on the RPM Alternative 30 chart. However, it would eventually reach a number-six peak in the artist's home country, thanks to a resurgence of popularity in the United States later in the fall of 1996 resulting from the release of a "live" version that Morissette had performed at the Grammy Awards in Los Angeles earlier that year. This version was issued as part of the commercial single release for her follow-up single "You Learn"; the latter track was credited as the official "A"-side of the double-sided release during its entire chart run, which peaked at number six. Music journalists have attributed the uneven chart performance of "You Oughta Know" to resistance from Canadian radio programmers, because the aggressive, hard rock nature of the song marked a dramatic shift from Morissette's established image as a teen dance-pop star. Even in Morissette's own hometown of Ottawa, most radio stations resisted the song, with contemporary hit radio stations deeming it too rock-oriented for their formats and rock stations deeming it too dance-pop. It was the only single from the album not to hit number one or two on the Canadian pop charts. Despite the song's initially poor chart performance, however, the video reached number one on MuchMusic and number three on MusiquePlus in the summer, and overall album sales of Jagged Little Pill were comparable to those in the United States even while the single's performance was faltering.

"You Oughta Know" received moderate to major success worldwide. In New Zealand, the song was released twice: once as a solo single, then as a double A-side with "Ironic" in 1996. The solo release saw the song peak at number 25 and stay in the top 50 for 25 nonconsecutive weeks, while the re-release with "Ironic" allowed the song to reach number three. It was certified gold by Recorded Music NZ (RMNZ), for shipments of 15,000 copies. Most notably, the song was a top ten hit in three different genre charts in the United States, peaking at number three on the active rock charts, seven on the contemporary hit radio charts and number one for five weeks on the Billboard Alternative Songs chart, retaining the record for longest run by a woman atop that chart until it was surpassed by Lorde's "Royals" in 2013. In addition, the song was a top ten hit in Australia, and reached the top 40 in Belgium, the Netherlands, and Sweden.

The song saw some success in the United Kingdom, debuting at number 76 on the week ending of July 25, 1995; over the course of the next few weeks "You Oughta Know" rose to numbers 53, 40, and finally 22. The song held its peak position for a second week before falling to number 30, then continued to drop on the charts, and after eight weeks, it fell off the charts completely.

== Legacy ==
In 1996, "You Oughta Know" was nominated for three Grammy Awards, winning the awards for Best Rock Song and Best Female Rock Vocal Performance but losing Song of the Year to Seal's song "Kiss from a Rose". The song was later ranked at number 12 on VH1's "100 Greatest Songs of the 90's" in December 2007. In 2011, Slant ranked the song at No. 51 in its list of "The 100 Best Singles of the 1990s". In 2022, Pitchfork ranked the song at No. 33 in their list of "The 250 Best Songs of the 1990s". Additionally, the song entered About.com's "Top 10 Alanis Morissette Lyrics" list at number three, with Bill Lamb picking the lyrics, "And every time you speak her name, Does she know how you told me, You'd hold me until you died, Till you died, but you're still alive" as the best. In 2021, "You Oughta Know" was included on Rolling Stone's "500 Greatest Songs of All Time" list.

=== Covers and remixes ===
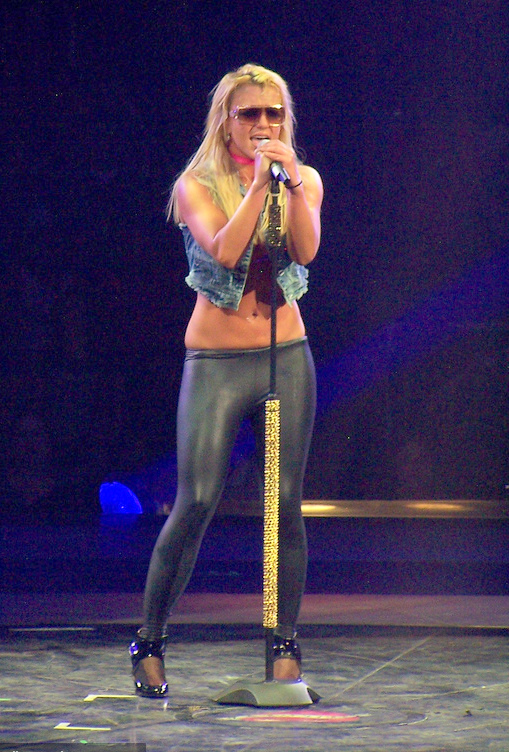
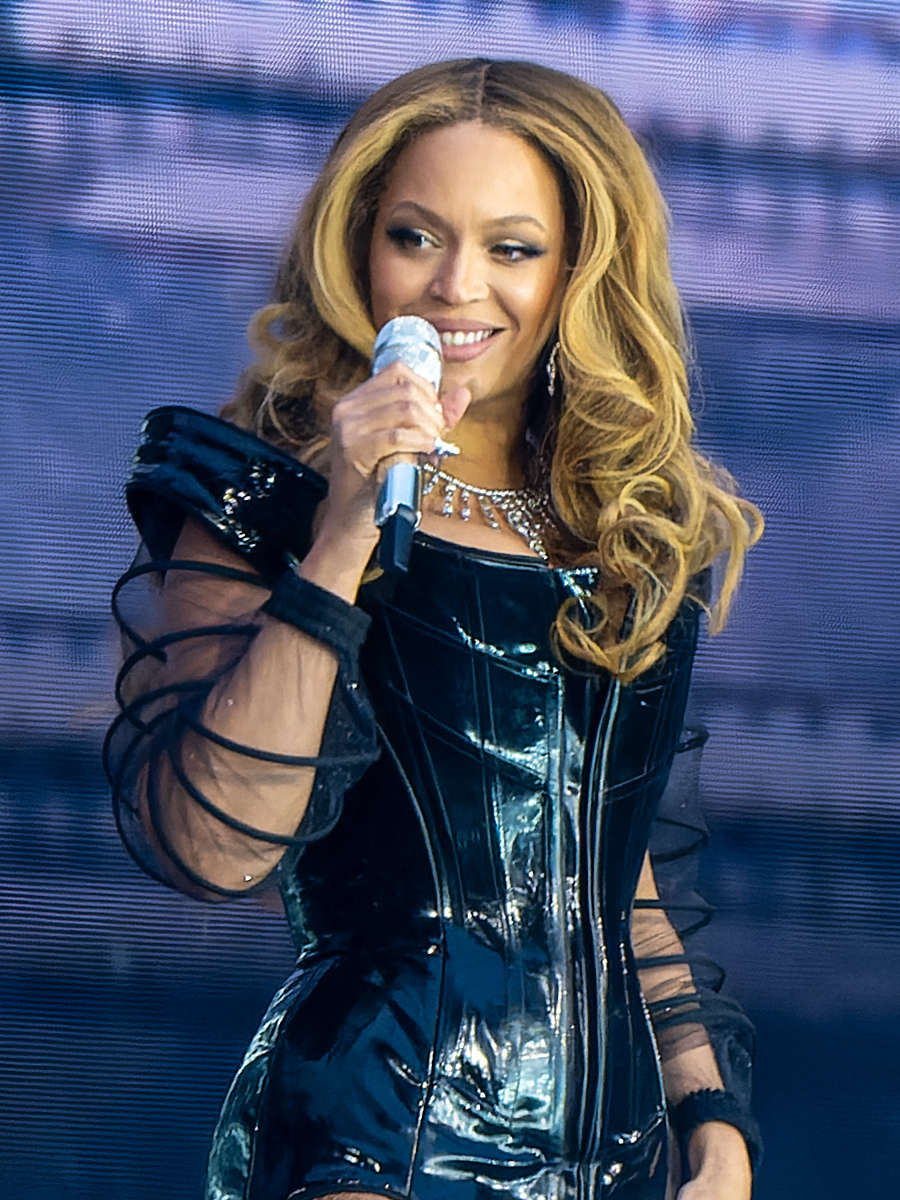
"You Oughta Know" has been covered by several artists, such as Britney Spears (left) and Beyoncé (right).

Britney Spears performed the song during her 2009 The Circus Starring Britney Spears tour. Mike Bruno of Entertainment Weekly wrote, "she rocked it. What better way to silence the critics than to step up to the mic, say to hell with it all, and spew some of that bile. Hot, confident Britney, live vocals, a dash of rebellion…" After a number of Jonathan Coulton's fans compared Morissette's cover of "My Humps" to his cover of "Baby Got Back", he covered "You Oughta Know" himself.

The song was sampled by American R&B singer Beyoncé during her 2009 I Am... World Tour, her I Am... Yours residency in Las Vegas, as well as at the 2010 Grammys and her historic headlining Glastonbury Festival Performance.

Released March 25, 2022, the fifth episode of Season 2 of the Netflix drama Bridgerton, entitled "An Unthinkable Fate", included a classical strings rendition of "You Oughta Know", appropriately placed in a break-up scene in which Kate Sharma rides her horse by herself shortly after discovering that her male romantic interest Anthony Bridgerton had indeed "bugged her in the middle of dinner". The version in the episode is instrumental, but Netflix also "got Alanis to sing along with the special cover".

A re-arranged version of the song appears in Jagged Little Pill, a 2020 jukebox musical based around music by Morissette. Composer Tom Kitt noted that it was particularly difficult to adapt "You Oughta Know", questioning how they could "take something that already is a ball of fire and truth and emotion" and still have it "stake its own claim in the musical".

=== Duet performances ===
Before inviting Morissette onstage to sing "You Oughta Know" with her at an August 2015 concert, Taylor Swift said, "[Morissette] inspired a generation of confessional female singer-songwriters who all of the sudden felt like you could actually say these raw feelings that you had. You could actually sing about your real life. You could put detail to it. You could get really, really mad if you wanted to. And I think that it is fair to say that so many of the female singer-songwriters of my generation, including myself, would not write the way we do without her and her music." Many of Swift's concert attendees, who were born after the song's release, expressed bewilderment as to Morissette's identity on social media. Amanda Marcotte defended the confused Swifties in Slate, arguing "You Oughta Know" had not aged well, thanks to the rise of media critiques towards attitudes about potential suitors claiming they were being "put in the friend zone" throughout pop culture. She also stated that "There's no reason for the teens of this world to know anything about Alanis Morissette."

On November 22, 2015, Demi Lovato and Morissette teamed up to perform "You Oughta Know" at the 2015 American Music Awards. The performance was met with critical acclaim and turned out to be "one of the most talked-about moments" of the 2015 edition of the awards show.

Morissette was invited to perform the song with 4 country singers Lainey Wilson, Ingrid Andress, Madeline Edwards and Morgan Wade at the 2023 CMT Music Awards.

On October 5, 2023, P!nk invited Morissette to perform the song together during Pink's Summer Carnival Tour.

On March 14, 2026, indie-pop artist St. Vincent covered the song solo and together with Morissette at Spotify 20th Anniversary Event ("Spotify 20: Live at Stubb's").

== Track listing ==
- CD single
1. "You Oughta Know"
2. "You Oughta Know" (The Jimmy the Saint Blend)
3. "Perfect" (acoustic)
4. "Wake Up"

== Personnel ==
Personnel taken from Jagged Little Pill liner notes.

Musicians

- Alanis Morissette – vocals
- Dave Navarro – guitar
- Flea – bass
- Benmont Tench – organ
- Matt Laug – drums
- Glen Ballard – programming

Engineering

- Chris Fogel – recording and mix
- Chris Bellman – mastering
- Jimmy Boyle – additional recording and mix

== Charts ==
=== Weekly charts ===
Weekly chart performance for "You Oughta Know"
Chart (1995–1996)	Peak position
Australia (ARIA)	4
Belgium (Ultratop 50 Flanders)	39
Canada Top Singles (RPM)	6
Canada Rock/Alternative (RPM)	21
Europe (Eurochart Hot 100)	71
Europe (European Hit Radio)	17
Iceland (Íslenski Listinn Topp 40)	11
Italy Airplay (Music & Media)	10
Netherlands (Dutch Top 40)	11
Netherlands (Single Top 100)	17
New Zealand (Recorded Music NZ)	25
New Zealand (Recorded Music NZ) with "Ironic"	3
Scottish Singles Sales (Official Charts)	22
Sweden (Sverigetopplistan)	38
UK Singles (Official Charts)	22
UK Airplay (Music Week)	31
US Billboard Hot 100 with "You Learn"	6
US Alternative Airplay (Billboard)	1
US Mainstream Rock Airplay (Billboard)	3
US Pop Airplay (Billboard)	7
US Radio Songs (Billboard) 1995 radio release	13
US Cash Box Top 100	2
US Active Rock (Radio & Records)	2
US Alternative (Radio & Records)	1
US CHR/Pop (Radio & Records)	9
US Pop/Alternative (Radio & Records)	1
US Rock (Radio & Records)	6

=== Year-end charts ===
1995 year-end chart performance for "You Oughta Know"
Chart (1995)	Position
Australia (ARIA)	20
Canada Top Singles (RPM)	45
US Hot 100 Airplay (Billboard)	38
US Mainstream Rock Tracks (Billboard)	33
US Modern Rock Tracks (Billboard)	4
US Top 40/Mainstream (Billboard)	40
US Alternative (Radio & Records)	5
US CHR/Pop (Radio & Records)	50
US Rock (Radio & Records)	36

1996 year-end chart performance for "You Oughta Know"
Chart (1996)	Position
US Billboard Hot 100	29

== Certifications ==
Certifications for "You Oughta Know"
Region	Certification	Certified units/sales
Australia (ARIA)	Platinum	70,000^{^}
New Zealand (RMNZ)	Platinum	30,000^{‡}
United Kingdom (BPI)	Platinum	600,000^{‡}
^{^} Shipments figures based on certification alone.^{‡} Sales+streaming figures based on certification alone.

== Release history ==
Release dates and formats for "You Oughta Know"
Region	Date	Format(s)	Label(s)	Ref.
United States	June 5, 1995	Alternative radio	Maverick; Reprise	
United Kingdom	July 10, 1996	CD; cassette	Maverick; Reprise	
Australia	July 17, 1996	CD; cassette	Maverick; WEA	
Japan	July 25, 1996	CD	Maverick; Reprise	

== See also ==
- "The Terrorist Attack", an episode of Curb Your Enthusiasm that includes the identity of the song's subject as a joke
- "You're So Vain", a Carly Simon song with another mystery subject
- "P.S. I Love You", a song performed by Cobie Smulders in character as "Robin Daggers" Scherbatsky in the eponymous episode of How I Met Your Mother, parodying the controversy of "You Oughta Know", including the suspicion that the subject is Dave Coulier.
