= Mah Damba =

- Born: Mah Sissoko; 1965 (age 60–61); Bamako, Mali
- Occupations: Griot, singer

Mah Damba (born Mah Sissoko in Bamako, Mali, 1965) is a traditional griot singer. She comes from a family of griots: her father, Djeli Baba Sissoko (not to be confused with the younger musician Baba Sissoko), was a griot and her aunt, Fanta Damba, is also considered a top vocalist.

Early in her career, she was part of Kassemady Diabaté's ensemble, and later was part of Mandé Foli. She recorded two solo albums, Nyarela (Buda/Musique du Monde) in 1997 and Djelimousso, Mali: The Voice of the Mande (Trema/Sony) in 2000, as contributed three tracks to The Divas from Mali (World Network) in 1998. In 1999, she contributed vocals to one track on composer Jonathan Elias' international choral project, The Prayer Cycle.

Her band is composed of traditional instruments, such as the ngoni (played by her husband Mamaye Kouyaté), kora (played by Djeli Moussa Diawara) and bala (played by Lansiné Kouyaté).
