= Walk Away (Alanis Morissette song) =

1991 single by Alanis Morissette

- Promotional material

Single by Alanis Morissette

from the album Alanis
- Released: 1991
- Studio: Distortion Studios, Ottawa
- Genre: Pop; dance; freestyle
- Length: 4:50 (album version); 3:56 (radio edit)
- Label: MCA (MCAD91109)
- Songwriters: Alanis Morissette; Leslie Howe; Louise Reny; Frank Levin
- Producer: Leslie Howe

Alanis Morissette singles chronology
"Too Hot" (1991)	"Walk Away" (1991)	"Feel Your Love" (1991)

Music video
- "Walk Away" on YouTube

"Walk Away" is a pop-dance and freestyle song co-written by Alanis Morissette, Leslie Howe, Louise Reny and Frank Levin, and produced by Howe for Morissette's debut album, Alanis (1991). Its protagonist sends a warning to her boyfriend who "never think[s] twice before [he] break all the rules", telling him "I'll walk away and say good bye if you don't want me anymore ... if I don't get the love we had before". It was released to radio and television as the album's second single in 1991 (see 1991 in music), but it was not given a commercial release. The promotional single for the song includes a radio edit only. The song charted at number 35 in Canada. It was also featured in the film Problem Child 2.

"Walk Away" was one of the demo recordings Leslie Howe and Morissette created with keyboardist Serge Côté in the studio, after Howe and her entertainment manager Stephan Klovan had decided to try to secure a record contract for her.

== Music video ==
Howe and Klovan funded an expensive promotional video for the song that was filmed in Paris, France; it featured Morissette playing in a fountain near the Eiffel Tower. In 1988 Howe sent the video to Alexander, who was impressed by it and subsequently helped secure publishing and record deals for Morissette.

The single's video (1991) features Matt LeBlanc as Morissette's boyfriend who arrives late for a date with her, and it includes scenes in which Morissette dances.

== Personnel ==
- Produced, engineered and mixed by Leslie Howe for Ghetto Records
- Keyboards by Serge Côté
- Drum programming, guitar and additional keyboards by Leslie "Bud" Howe
- All vocals by Alanis Morissette
- Recorded at Distortion Studios in Ottawa, Ontario, Canada
