= Reasons I Drink =

Single by Alanis Morissette

from the album Such Pretty Forks in the Road
- Released: December 2, 2019
- Studio: Assault & Battery Studios (London, UK); Sage & Sound Studios (Los Angeles, CA)
- Genre: Alternative rock; baroque rock
- Length: 3:36
- Label: Epiphany Records
- Songwriters: Alanis Morissette; Michael Farrell
- Producer: Alex Hope

Alanis Morissette singles chronology
"Receive" (2012)	"Reasons I Drink" (2019)	"Smiling" (2020)

Music video
- "Reasons I Drink" on YouTube

"Reasons I Drink" is a song by Canadian-American singer Alanis Morissette from her ninth studio album, Such Pretty Forks in the Road (2020). It was released as the lead single from the album on December 2, 2019, through Epiphany Records.

== Live performances ==
Morissette performed the song for the first time live at the Tonight Show Starring Jimmy Fallon on December 5, 2019.

== Charts ==
Chart performance for "Reasons I Drink"
Chart (2019–2020)	Peak position
France (SNEP)	105
Belgium (Ultratip Bubbling Under Wallonia)	32
Hungary (Rádiós Top 40)	23
Scotland Singles (OCC)	99
Slovakia (Rádio Top 100)	49
US Adult Alternative Airplay (Billboard)	8
US Adult Pop Airplay (Billboard)	36
US Hot Rock & Alternative Songs (Billboard)	39
UK Singles Downloads (OCC)	98

== Release history ==
Release history for "Reasons I Drink"
Region	Date	Format(s)	Ref.
Various	December 2, 2019	Digital download; streaming	
United States	December 9, 2019	Adult album alternative radio	
