= No Apologies (Alanis Morissette song) =

- Promotional material

Single by Alanis Morissette

from the album Now Is the Time
- Released: February 2, 1993
- Studio: Distortion Studios, Ottawa
- Genre: Pop
- Length: 5:02 (Album version); 4:32 (Radio edit)
- Label: MCA (MCADS 9326)
- Songwriters: Alanis Morissette; Leslie Howe; Serge Côté
- Producer: Leslie Howe

Alanis Morissette singles chronology
"An Emotion Away" (1992)	"No Apologies" (1993)	"Real World" (1993)

"No Apologies" is a pop-ballad song co-written by Alanis Morissette, Leslie Howe and Serge Côté, and produced by Howe for Morissette's second album Now Is the Time (1992). It was released as the album's second single in 1993 (see 1993 in music) and was Morissette's first ballad to be released as a single. It received radio and video play but was not given a commercial release, and it did not cause sales of Now Is the Time to significantly increase, although it did reach number 14 on the Canadian pop chart. Leslie Howe engineered and mixed the song, and a promotional single for it includes the album version and a radio edit.

== Music video ==
A music video was produced to promote the single. Shot in monochrome, Alanis is seen in a classic dress, lounging on a chair in an abandoned old room. Candles flicker around her, as she begins to wander around the room. She then approaches a window, looks out from it, and gazes from above her balcony.
