= Such Pretty Forks in the Road =

2020 studio album by Alanis Morissette

Studio album by Alanis Morissette
- Released: July 31, 2020
- Recorded: 2017–2020
- Studio: Assault & Battery Studios (London, UK); Sage & Sound Studios (Los Angeles, CA)
- Genre: Indie pop; chamber pop; pop rock
- Length: 46:03
- Label: Epiphany
- Producer: Alex Hope; Catherine Marks

Alanis Morissette chronology
Live at Montreux 2012 (2013)	Such Pretty Forks in the Road (2020)	Such Pretty Forks in the Mix (2020)

Singles from Such Pretty Forks in the Road
- 1. "Reasons I Drink" Released: December 2, 2019; 2. "Smiling" Released: February 21, 2020; 3. "Diagnosis" Released: April 24, 2020; 4. "Reckoning" Released: July 9, 2020; 5. "Ablaze" Released: August 4, 2020

Such Pretty Forks in the Road is the ninth (and seventh international) studio album by Canadian-American singer-songwriter Alanis Morissette, released on July 31, 2020, through Epiphany Music and Thirty Tigers in North America, and by RCA and Sony Music in Europe. It is Morissette's first studio album in eight years, following 2012's Havoc and Bright Lights.

The album was preceded by the singles "Reasons I Drink" and "Smiling", the latter being a new song written for the Jagged Little Pill stage musical. The album debuted at number 16 on the US Billboard 200 and number one on the US Top Rock Albums charts, earning 23,000 album-equivalent units in its first week. The album won Adult Contemporary Album of the Year Award at the 2021 Juno Awards.

The title of the album comes from the lyric line of the first track, "Smiling".

== Background ==
Morissette had been working on the album since at least mid-2017. In August 2017 on Anna Faris' podcast Unqualified, Morissette revealed the name of a new song called "Reckoning". She described this song as "patriarchy falling down", and said it was in reference to her day in court in regards to the trial in which others were convicted of embezzling from her. In early October 2017, on her own podcast Conversation with Alanis Morissette, she detailed a new song called "Diagnosis", in which she describes postpartum depression and how she felt better when she knew what was going on with herself. Later that month at the tribute concert Linkin Park and Friends: Celebrate Life in Honor of Chester Bennington, Morissette was invited as a guest to perform "Castle of Glass" and a new song of hers called "Rest". She said that she had been working with Mike Farrell and writing new demos.

In March 2018, Morissette previewed another new song from the album called "Ablaze", dedicated to her children. In August 2018 on Laura Whitmore's Sunday Session on BBC Radio 5 Live, she stated that the new album would be a "piano record", and that "Rest" would make the final cut. In October 2018, Morissette said that 23 songs would be on the new album when replying to fans.

In August 2019, Morissette revealed that she was working with Alex Hope and Catherine Marks on her as-of-then untitled record. In December 2019, she debuted the songs "Reasons I Drink" and the song "Smiling" during a performance at the Apollo Theater in New York City on 2 December, the latter of which was described as "sanguine" by Suzy Exposito of Rolling Stone.

On April 16, 2020, Morissette postponed the album to a later date from its initial release date of May 1, 2020, due to the COVID-19 pandemic; "Diagnosis" was released as the third single on April 24, 2020.

== Promotion ==
Morissette was scheduled to embark on a world tour for the 25th anniversary of her 1995 album Jagged Little Pill in June 2020, during which she would perform songs from her entire career, including songs from Such Pretty Forks in the Road. In May 2020, the tour was postponed to 2021 following concerns of the COVID-19 pandemic in the United States.

== Critical reception ==
Professional ratings
Aggregate scores
Source	Rating
Metacritic	71/100
Review scores
Source	Rating
Consequence of Sound	B
Evening Standard	4/5 stars
The Independent	5/5 stars
The Line of Best Fit	8/10
musicOMH	4/5 stars
NME	3/5 stars
Pitchfork	6.5/10
PopMatters	8/10 stars
Rolling Stone	2.5/5 stars
The Sydney Morning Herald	3.5/5 stars

Such Pretty Forks in the Road received positive reviews from music critics. At Metacritic, which assigns a normalized rating out of 100 to reviews from mainstream publications, the album received a weighted average score of 71, based on 12 reviews, which indicates "generally favorable reviews". In addition to the Juno Award Adult contemporary Album of the year, which she won, Morissette was also nominated as Songwriter of the Year.

== Commercial performance ==
Such Pretty Forks in the Road debuted at number 16 on the US Billboard 200 chart, earning 23,000 album-equivalent units (of which 20,000 copies were pure album sales) in its first week. The album also debuted at number one on the US Top Rock Albums chart, becoming her second number one album on that chart. Additionally, Such Pretty Forks in the Road debuted at number two on the US Billboard's Independent Albums chart.

The album reached number 8 on the UK Albums Chart, her highest entry there since So Called Chaos which reached the same position in 2004.

== Track listing ==
All tracks are written by Alanis Morissette and Michael Farrell.

Such Pretty Forks in the Road track listing
No.	Title	Producer(s)	Length
1.	"Smiling"	Alex Hope	4:17
2.	"Ablaze"	Hope	3:57
3.	"Reasons I Drink"	Hope	3:36
4.	"Diagnosis"	Hope	4:49
5.	"Missing the Miracle"	Catherine Marks	3:33
6.	"Losing the Plot"	Hope	3:57
7.	"Reckoning"	Marks	3:30
8.	"Sandbox Love"	Marks	4:12
9.	"Her"	Marks	4:10
10.	"Nemesis"	Marks	5:56
11.	"Pedestal"	Marks	4:08
Total length:			46:03

== Personnel ==
- Alanis Morissette – vocals, backing vocals
- Alex Hope – guitars, synths, marxophone, programming, string arrangement
- Michael Farrell – piano, synths, organ, marxophone, string arrangement
- Catherine Marks – synths, programming, string arrangement
- Adam 'Cecil' Bartlett – acoustic guitar, synths and programming
- Victor Indrizzo – drums
- Tyler Last – bass
- Steve Milbourne – acoustic guitar
- Chris J. Alderton – guitar
- David Levita – guitar
- Cedric Lemoyne – bass
- Frank Turner – guitar
- Chris Dugan – mixing
- Emily Lazar – mastering engineer

== Such Pretty Forks in the Mix ==
Such Pretty Forks in the Mix

Remix album / extended play by Alanis Morissette
- Released: December 11, 2020
- Length: 38:45
- Label: Epiphany; He.She.They.
- Producer: Alex Hope; Catherine Marks

Alanis Morissette chronology
Such Pretty Forks in the Road (2020)	Such Pretty Forks in the Mix (2020)	The Storm Before the Calm (2022)

Such Pretty Forks in the Mix is a remix extended play released on December 11, 2020, by Epiphany Music and He.She.They. Records with distribution from Thirty Tigers. The EP features remixes from songs from Morissette's ninth studio album, Such Pretty Forks in the Road, by trans-inclusive female artists, as well as two performances recorded in March 2020 and taken from her live album Live at London's O2 Shepherd's Bush Empire, 2020. A portion of the proceeds went to Safe Place International, an organization helping LGBT refugees in Turkey and Greece.

=== Track listing ===
All tracks are written by Alanis Morissette and Michael Farrell

Such Pretty Forks in the Mix track listing
No.	Title	Producer(s)	Length
1.	"Smiling" (Lauren Faith Remix)	Alex Hope	3:34
2.	"Ablaze" (MUNA Remix)	Hope	4:19
3.	"Reasons I Drink" (Girlpool Remix)	Hope	2:02
4.	"Diagnosis" (Muhsinah Remix)	Hope	4:56
5.	"Reckoning" (Eris Drew's Standing at the Gate Remix)	Catherine Marks	7:06
6.	"Sandbox Love" (MNDR Remix)	Marks	8:30
7.	"Smiling" (Live at London's 02 Shepherd's Bush Empire)		4:14
8.	"Reasons I Drink" (Live at London's 02 Shepherd's Bush Empire)		4:02
Total length:			38:45

== Charts ==
=== Weekly charts ===
Chart performance for Such Pretty Forks in the Road
Chart (2020)	Peak position
Australian Albums (ARIA)	10
Austrian Albums (Ö3 Austria)	4
Belgian Albums (Ultratop Flanders)	34
Belgian Albums (Ultratop Wallonia)	3
Canadian Albums (Billboard)	14
Croatian International Albums (HDU)	23
Dutch Albums (Album Top 100)	13
French Albums (SNEP)	45
German Albums (Offizielle Top 100)	4
Irish Albums (OCC)	15
Italian Albums (FIMI)	16
New Zealand Albums (RMNZ)	40
Polish Albums (ZPAV)	27
Portuguese Albums (AFP)	7
Scottish Albums (OCC)	6
Spanish Albums (PROMUSICAE)	33
Swiss Albums (Schweizer Hitparade)	2
Swiss Albums (Romandie)	1
UK Albums (OCC)	8
US Billboard 200	16
US Independent Albums (Billboard)	2
US Top Alternative Albums (Billboard)	3
US Top Rock Albums (Billboard)	1

=== Year-end charts ===
Year-end chart performance for Such Pretty Forks in the Road
Chart (2020)	Position
US Top Current Album Sales	142

== Release history ==
Release dates and formats for Such Pretty Forks in the Road
Region	Date	Format	Label	Ref.
Various	July 31, 2020	CD; vinyl; Digital download; streaming	Epiphany; Thirty Tigers	
