= Smiling (song) =

Single by Alanis Morissette

from the album Such Pretty Forks in the Road
- Released: February 21, 2020
- Studio: Assault & Battery Studios (London, UK); Sage & Sound Studios (Los Angeles, CA)
- Length: 4:17
- Label: Epiphany; Thirty Tigers
- Songwriters: Alanis Morissette; Michael Farrell
- Producer: Alex Hope

Alanis Morissette singles chronology
"Reasons I Drink" (2019)	"Smiling" (2020)	"Diagnosis" (2020)

"Smiling" is a song by Canadian-American singer Alanis Morissette co-written by Morissette and Michael Farrell. It was one of two new songs written for the Broadway adaptation of Morissette's 1995 album, Jagged Little Pill, and later released as the second single from her ninth studio album, Such Pretty Forks in the Road, on February 21, 2020. The album's title is taken from a lyric in this song. Morissette subsequently released a duet version of the song featuring Jagged Little Pill actress Elizabeth Stanley with the rest of the cast on backing vocals.

== Tracklist ==
F9 Remix Single

1. "Smiling" (F9 Radio Remix) - 3:27
2. "Smiling" (F9 Club Remix) - 5:27

Bil Bless Remix Single

1. "Smiling" (Bil Bless Remix) (with Elizabeth Stanley and Original Broadway Cast of Jagged Little Pill) - 4:40

Elizabeth Stanley & Jagged Little Pill version

1. "Smiling" (with Elizabeth Stanley and Original Broadway Cast of Jagged Little Pill) - 3:52

== In Jagged Little Pill ==
In Jagged Little Pill, the song appears in the first act sung by Mary Jane (MJ) Healy, the matriarch of a suburban Connecticut family. In the scene, she is singing about her feelings of having to keep up appearances while dealing with the pressures of motherhood and everyday life, as well as struggling with an addiction to painkillers following a car accident. The song is sung right after a pharmacist refuses to provide further pain medication as her prescription has run out. Desperate, she buys opioids off the street from a familiar dealer. During the song, MJ's day is shown in reverse, detailing her life and addiction from unpacking groceries to the street deal to running out of medication in the morning.

== Charts ==
Chart (2020)	Peak position
France (SNEP)	185
Netherlands (Dutch Top 40 Tipparade)	23
US Rock Digital Song Sales (Billboard)	4

== Release history ==
Release dates and formats for "Smiling"
Region	Date	Format	Version	Label
Various	February 21, 2020	Digital download; streaming	Original	Epiphany; Thirty Tigers
Various	April 3, 2020	Digital download; streaming	F9 Remix	Epiphany; Thirty Tigers
Various	June 30, 2020	Digital download; streaming	Bli Bless Remix	Epiphany; Thirty Tigers
Various	July 3, 2020	Digital download; streaming	Elizabeth Stanley version	Atlantic
