= The Chronicles of Narnia: The Lion, the Witch and the Wardrobe (soundtrack) =

Soundtrack album by Harry Gregson-Williams
- Released: 13 December 2005
- Recorded: September–November 2005
- Studios: Todd-AO Scoring Stage; Abbey Road Studios (choir)
- Genre: Soundtrack
- Length: 70:44
- Label: Walt Disney Records
- Producer: Harry Gregson-Williams

The Chronicles of Narnia: The Lion, the Witch and the Wardrobe is the soundtrack of the film of the same name. Harry Gregson-Williams composed the soundtrack, which was released on 13 December 2005 in the United States by Walt Disney Records.

The score was nominated for Best Original Score and the song "Wunderkind" by Alanis Morissette was nominated for Best Original Song at the 63rd Golden Globe Awards. The score was also nominated for Best Score Soundtrack Album for Motion Picture, Television or Other Visual Media and the song "Can’t Take It In" by Imogen Heap was nominated for Best Song Written For Motion Picture, Television or Other Visual Media at the 49th Grammy Awards.

== Background ==
Gregson-Williams was the first composer whom director Andrew Adamson approached for the film because they had worked together on Shrek (2001) and Shrek 2 (2004). Because Adamson had to shoot the film in New Zealand for an extended period and Gregson-Williams was working on scores for films such as Kingdom of Heaven, he initially only prepared for the project by re-reading the book and reading the film script. It was not until he saw the first cut of the film that, as he put it, "I could see the look of it, the look of the characters. I found that what I felt emotionally, when compared to the book, was quite different and it was then at that point that I could really 'get under the skin' of the project." He said that although re-reading the book helped him enter "that headspace," the script also provided "a lot of good information" because it included several scenes that were not in the book.

== Writing and recording ==
=== Score ===
During the recording process, Gregson-Williams employed the 75-piece Hollywood Studio Symphony, along with a 140-member choir (from Abbey Road Studios, London, England; mostly members of the Bach Choir) and numerous other solo musicians such as electric violinist Hugh Marsh and vocalist Lisbeth Scott (at his Wavecrest Studio). He composed the original score and then spent late September through early November 2005 conducting the Hollywood Orchestra and overseeing the recording of the English choir. For "color", he employed instruments used in ancient folk music, and to underscore critical dramatic moments, he added choral textures and, occasionally, a solo voice. The score includes instances of electronic music.

Though frequent comparisons were made between it and Howard Shore's score for The Lord of the Rings film trilogy (2001–03), Gregson-Williams said he was not influenced by Shore during the scoring of The Chronicles of Narnia. He also said he composed over 100 minutes of music for the original score, although less than sixty minutes made the final cut. There is a bootleg copy of the complete recordings circulating on the internet, although no official version of this soundtrack has been released. The complete recordings comprises all music composed by Williams for the movie.

The score features many uses of themes or leitmotifs, the most prominent of which are a motif for the Pevensie children, a motif for Narnia itself, and the "Heroic motif". The heroic motif, however, is not heard until track nine ("To Aslan's Camp").

=== Songs ===
Gregson-Williams co-wrote a song with Imogen Heap, "Can't Take It In", which Heap recorded for the soundtrack. Originally, Dido submitted a song for the soundtrack, but it was considered unsatisfactory. Heap was approached after a suggestion from the soundtrack's supervisor, who managed a band with whom Heap had toured. The song was written, recorded, produced and mixed in a week; Heap said she needed "like a year more than I got" and considered the experience of handing in the song an hour after completing it "[p]retty scary". According to her, the creation of the song was difficult because The Chronicles of Narnia is a family film, so she "had to be quite descriptive and not too electronic" when making the song.

The soundtrack includes the song "Wunderkind", which Alanis Morissette wrote and recorded in three days; it was produced by Mike Elizondo. According to her, after watching a rough cut of the film the song "seemed to flow from [me]", and that it "really touches me deeply". Also included is "Winter Light", written and recorded by Tim Finn. The album song "Where", sung by Lisbeth Scott, does not appear in the film, but its melody is based on the Pevensie children motif from the score.

Evanescence lead singer Amy Lee claimed she had been approached to write music for the film, both of which were rejected. However, the producers of the film stated that they had never approached Lee about penning music for the film, and that it was "news to them". No Evanescence music had ever been planned for the score of the film.

== Response ==
The album debuted on the U.S. Billboard 200 at number 43, selling 20,000 copies in its first week. In its second week on the chart it dropped to number 65 before moving to number 57 in its third week after the holiday box office success of the film. It descended to number 59 in week four. "Wunderkind" was issued as a radio single in some parts of Asia.

The album received 3 stars out of a possible 5 from Filmtracks, 3 stars out of a possible 5 from Allmusic and 3 stars out of a possible 4 from MovieMusic UK. The soundtrack was nominated for two Golden Globes (Best Original Song for "Wunderkind" and Best Original Score) and two Grammys (Best Song Written for a Motion Picture, Television or Other Visual Media for "Can't Take It In" and Best Score Soundtrack Album for a Motion Picture, Television or Other Visual Media).

== Track listing ==
No.	Title	Length
1.	"The Blitz, 1940"	2:32
2.	"Evacuating London"	3:38
3.	"The Wardrobe"	2:54
4.	"Lucy Meets Mr. Tumnus"	4:10
5.	"A Narnia Lullaby"	1:12
6.	"The White Witch"	5:30
7.	"From Western Woods to Beaversdam"	3:34
8.	"Father Christmas"	3:20
9.	"To Aslan's Camp"	3:12
10.	"Knighting Peter"	3:48
11.	"The Stone Table"	8:06
12.	"The Battle"	7:08
13.	"Only the Beginning of the Adventure"	5:32
14.	"Can't Take It In" (Imogen Heap)	4:42
15.	"Wunderkind" (Alanis Morissette)	5:19
16.	"Winter Light" (Tim Finn)	4:13
17.	"Where" (Lisbeth Scott, not featured in the film)	1:54

- Many parts of "The Battle" were used for the soundtrack of the second The Chronicles of Narnia film, The Chronicles of Narnia: Prince Caspian, and is used as the motif for the film series.

=== Bonus DVD ===
A special edition was released the same day that includes a bonus DVD with the following features:

- film art gallery
- concept art gallery
- Behind the Magic of Narnia: Featuring the Score with Harry Gregson-Williams
- A look at Sparrow Records' Music Inspired by... soundtrack

== Charts ==
Chart (2005–2006)	Peak position
Austrian Albums Chart	63
Belgium (Flanders) Albums Chart	63
Belgium (Walloon) Albums Chart	68
French Albums Chart	66
Swiss Albums Chart	66
U.S. Billboard 200	43
U.S. Billboard Top Soundtracks	2

== Musicians ==
Musicians that were involved in the making of the soundtrack.

- Composed by: Harry Gregson-Williams (wrote the music for track 14, "Can't Take It In")
- Conducted by: Harry Gregson-Williams
- Performing orchestra: The Hollywood Studio Symphony
- Choir: 140-member Abbey Road Studios group from the Bach Choir
- Solo vocalist: Lisbeth Scott (recorded at Wavecrest Studio)
- Electric violinist: Hugh Marsh (recorded at Wavecrest Studio)
- Duduk player: Chris Bleth ("A Narnia Lullaby")

== See also ==
- Music Inspired by The Chronicles of Narnia: The Lion, the Witch and the Wardrobe
