= Louise Reny =

Canadian vocalist and songwriter

- Origin: Ottawa, Ontario, Canada
- Genres: Singer, songwriter

Louise Reny is a Canadian vocalist and songwriter. She was in the bands One to One, Sal's Birdland, and Artificial Joy Club. She worked with Alanis Morissette on her first two albums. She also sang the theme songs of the Canadian cartoons Just Jamie and Kevin Spencer.

== Work with Alanis Morissette ==
Reny along with her One to One bandmate and husband at the time Leslie Howe worked on Alanis Morissette's first two albums. Reny and Howe co-wrote Morissette's albums Alanis and Now Is the Time, with Howe producing and releasing on his own Ghetto Records label.

Reny met Morissette when Morissette was 12 years old. Both from Ottawa, Reny was well known in the local music scene. Morissette sought her out for advice.
