= Eight Easy Steps =

Single by Alanis Morissette

from the album So-Called Chaos
- Released: October 19, 2004
- Genre: Rock
- Length: 2:52
- Label: Maverick
- Songwriter: Alanis Morissette
- Producers: Alanis Morissette; John Shanks; Tim Thorney

Alanis Morissette singles chronology
"Out Is Through" (2004)	"Eight Easy Steps" (2004)	"Crazy" (2005)

Music video
- "Eight Easy Steps" on YouTube

"Eight Easy Steps" is a rock song written by Alanis Morissette for her sixth studio album, So-Called Chaos. The album's opening track, it was released in 2004 as the So-Called Chaos's third (and final) single. The song may be seen as discussing self-help, with the message that it is the "course of a lifetime", but the help that is actually "offered" in the song is tongue-in-cheek, with lines like "How to lie to yourself and thereby to everyone else" and "How to control someone to be a carbon copy of you."

The song reached number nine on the Billboard Hot Dance Music/Club Play and number 27 on the Adult Top 40.

== Music and structure ==
"Eight Easy Steps"
The verse transitions into the louder hard rock chorus.

"Eight Easy Steps" is a song composed in the key of A♭ major. It is written in common time and moves at a moderately fast 132 beats per minute. Its verses are set to a Middle Eastern beat. Morissette's vocal range spans nearly an octave and a half, from A♭_{3} to C_{5}.

== Critical reception ==
Stylus Magazine gave the song a negative review, finding it a "flaccid and innocuous" attempt to recreate the hard rock sound of her 1995 single "You Oughta Know". PopMatters disagreed, commenting that the chorus's "one shining moment of Alanis Anger" was one of the album's few energetic moments. The New York Times called the song "triumphant", and The Guardian found the song's distortion effective, as well as its "Nine Inch Nails-like metallic rage".

== Music video ==
The song's music video was directed by Liz Friedlander. The video opens with a scene of Morissette performing with her backing band. It then presents sequences from Morissette's previous music videos, television appearances like You Can't Do That on Television, and home videos in reverse chronological order. The scenes are digitally edited to create the appearance that Morissette had sung "Eight Easy Steps" in them. It took Morissette over 16 hours, to recreate her facial expressions from the clips. Friedlander commented that "It was eerie to watch the footage of present day Alanis run side by side with the early footage…Her ability to match her old actions was uncanny." The video peaked at #11 on the VH1 Top 20 Video Countdown.

== Track listing ==
1. "Eight Easy Steps" (Thick Dick Filter Mix) – 6:56
2. "Eight Easy Steps" (Jez Colin & Flipper Dalton Remix) – 6:35
3. "Eight Easy Steps" (The Orange Factory Remix) – 6:58
4. "Eight Easy Steps" (Smitty & Gabriel D. Vine Remix) – 7:03

A second acoustic single was planned with more tracks from the Vancouver Sessions. However, it was scrapped before it was released.

== Charts ==
Chart (2004)	Peak position
Canada Hot AC Top 30 (Radio & Records)	16
US Adult Pop Airplay (Billboard)	27
US Dance Club Songs (Billboard)	9
US Dance Singles Sales (Billboard)	3
US Hot Singles Sales (Billboard)	37

== Credits and personnel ==
- Vocals: Alanis Morissette
- Guitar: Jason Orme
- Guitar: David Levita
- Guitar: Joel Shearer
- Producers: Alanis Morissette, John Shanks, Tim Thorney
- Audio mixing: Chris Lord-Alge, Adam Schiff
