= Out Is Through =

2004 single by Alanis Morissette

Single by Alanis Morissette

from the album So-Called Chaos
- Released: July 19, 2004
- Length: 3:50
- Label: Maverick
- Songwriter: Alanis Morissette
- Producers: Alanis Morissette; John Shanks; Tim Thorney

Alanis Morissette singles chronology
"Everything" (2004)	"Out Is Through" (2004)	"Eight Easy Steps" (2004)

"Out Is Through" is a song written by Canadian singer-songwriter Alanis Morissette for her sixth studio album, So-Called Chaos (2004). The song was released on July 19, 2004, in the United Kingdom, peaking at number 56 on the UK Singles Chart. It was not released in the United States.

== Music videos ==
There are two music videos for the song. On one of the videos, Morissette appears with her bandmates during a 2004 performance of the song on the UK weekend youth TV show T4, with the album track replacing the audio. The alternate video is about a fan-girl (Anne Vyalitsyna) running and trying to get to Morissette's different live performances until she finally does.

== Track listings ==
CD1

1. "Out Is Through"
2. "Spineless" (Vancouver sessions)

CD2

1. "Out Is Through"
2. "Eight Easy Steps" (Vancouver sessions)
3. "This Grudge" (Vancouver sessions)

== Charts ==
Chart (2004)	Peak position
Australia (ARIA)	79
Belgium (Ultratip Bubbling Under Wallonia)	18
Germany (GfK)	75
Netherlands (Dutch Top 40 Tipparade)	11
Netherlands (Single Top 100)	76
Scotland Singles (Official Charts)	67
Switzerland (Schweizer Hitparade)	67
UK Singles (Official Charts)	56

== Release history ==
Region	Date	Format(s)	Label(s)	Ref.
United Kingdom	July 19, 2004		Maverick	
Australia	August 2, 2004	CD	Maverick	
