= Wunderkind (song) =

Single by Alanis Morissette

from the album The Chronicles of Narnia: The Lion, the Witch and the Wardrobe
- Released: December 13, 2005
- Recorded: 2005
- Studio: Phantom Studios (Los Angeles, CA)
- Genre: Pop rock
- Length: 5:19
- Label: Walt Disney Records
- Songwriter: Alanis Morissette
- Producers: Mike Elizondo; Alanis Morissette

"Wunderkind" is a song written and recorded by Canadian-American singer Alanis Morissette for the soundtrack of the 2005 film The Chronicles of Narnia: The Lion, the Witch and the Wardrobe.

The song was nominated for Best Original Song at the 63rd Golden Globe Awards.

== Background ==
Morissette was inspired to write the song after watching a rough cut of the film; according to her, the song seemed to flow from her and "really touches me deeply". She wrote it on a Friday, recorded it on Saturday, and handed it in on Sunday. After the release of "Wunderkind", Morissette enlisted producer Mike Elizondo to co-produce her tenth album. The protagonist of the song, which is written from the point of view of the character of Lucy Pevensie, describes herself as "a magnet for all kinds of deeper wonderment", "a wunderkind" and "a princess on the way to [her] throne" during the chorus. The string arrangements were in charge of Harry Gregson-Williams, the movie's composer.

== Release and reception ==
IGN Music wrote that it was "equally captivating" as Imogen Heap's soundtrack contribution "Can't Take It In", with Morissette "letting her warble drip delicately over a piano driven lament. It's one of the best things she's done in a long time." Sci Fi Weekly also described it as "captivating", writing "Morissette delivers [it] with a depth of feeling that makes one sit up and take notice." Movie Music UK called the song "wholly unremarkable ... it doesn't help that Alanis Morissette can't pronounce the word 'wunderkind' properly - it comes out as "wander" (as in walk around aimlessly) and "kind" (as in being nice to someone)." Similarly, Christian Clemmensen of Filmtracks.com wrote "wait until you hear Alanis Morissette belt out her classless pronunciation of '[w]underkind'", and compared it to Annie Lennox's "Into the West", a song on the soundtrack for the 2003 film The Lord of the Rings: The Return of the King.

"Wunderkind" was nominated for the 2006 Golden Globe for "Best Original Song" (see 63rd Golden Globe Awards nominees). After the nominations were announced, Morissette's home was inundated with phone calls, leading her to assume that "something must be wrong, somebody must be hurt"; she later said she was "excited that some light is being shone on [the song]."

The song was premiered on AOL Music on November 18, 2005 (see 2005 in music), ahead of the December release of the film and of the soundtrack album The Chronicles of Narnia: The Lion, the Witch and the Wardrobe, on which it is featured. It was subsequently released as a radio single in some parts of Asia in early 2006 (see 2006 in music).

On February 28, 2010, Morissette performed the song at the closing ceremonies of the 2010 Winter Olympics in Vancouver. Because of that, the song charted at #4 on iTunes Canada.
