= So-Called Chaos =

Studio album by Alanis Morissette
- Released: May 18, 2004
- Recorded: 2003–2004
- Studio: Groove Masters, Santa Monica; Village Recorder, Los Angeles; Henson, Hollywood; Stage and Sound, Los Angeles
- Genre: Alternative rock; pop rock
- Length: 41:05
- Label: Maverick
- Producer: Alanis Morissette; Tim Thorney; John Shanks

Alanis Morissette chronology
Feast on Scraps (2002)	So-Called Chaos (2004)	Jagged Little Pill Acoustic (2005)

Singles from So-Called Chaos
- 1. "Everything" Released: March 22, 2004; 2. "Out Is Through" Released: July 19, 2004; 3. "Eight Easy Steps" Released: October 19, 2004

So-Called Chaos is the sixth studio album (fourth released internationally) by Canadian singer-songwriter Alanis Morissette, released on May 18, 2004, through Maverick Records. It was preceded by the single "Everything" on April 13, which went on to become Morissette's lowest peaking song on the US Billboard Hot 100 at number 76. The album was met with mixed reviews from critics upon release, with some calling it her most accessible record since Jagged Little Pill (1995), while others criticized the project's confusing messages and felt the singer had lost what made her a cultural icon of the '90s.

With 115,000 copies sold in its opening week, So-Called Chaos debuted at number five on the Billboard 200 and became Morissette's first international studio album not to reach the top of that chart. It failed to surpass predecessor Under Rug Swept (2002), which debuted at number-one with 215,000 first-week sales. Two subsequent singles, "Out Is Through" and "Eight Easy Steps", were released in July and October respectively, but neither managed to help improve album sales and both songs failed to enter the Hot 100.

== Background and release ==
It had been two years since Morissette released her fifth studio album, Under Rug Swept. In that time she had met her then fiancé Ryan Reynolds, inspiring many of the songs she wrote for So-Called Chaos. The album found her in a more contented and relaxed state than her previous output, and her songs were brighter and happier than her more volatile works like "You Oughta Know" and "Uninvited". One reporter asked if the song "This Grudge" was based on the same person as "You Oughta Know", and Morissette replied, "Different person, same era."

The first single, "Everything", was released to US radio in the spring of 2004, and was met with mixed reaction. US Adult Top 40 radio stations gave the song good airplay, but mainstream and top 40 stations were colder in their reception, and consequently it became Morissette's lowest peaking single on the Billboard Hot 100. "Everything" was included on the Totally Hits 2004, Vol. 2 compilation, and in 2006 it was featured in the film Clerks II.

== Critical reception ==
Professional ratings
Aggregate scores
Source	Rating
Metacritic	56/100
Review scores
Source	Rating
AllMusic	4/5 stars
Blender	3/5 stars
Dotmusic	8/10
Entertainment Weekly	C+
The Guardian	3/5 stars
Los Angeles Times	3/4 stars
Rolling Stone	2/5 stars
Slant Magazine	3/5 stars
Spin	B
Stylus	F

Some reviews of So-Called Chaos were positive, with many critics calling it her most accessible and mainstream record since Jagged Little Pill (1995). Still, others thought she had "sold out" for the sake of sales and radio play; Rolling Stone magazine, for example, said the album "attempts to reverse the sliding record sales following [Jagged Little Pill]."

== Commercial performance ==
The album debuted at number two on the Canadian albums chart with first week sales of 11,200, and at number five on the US Billboard 200, selling 115,000 copies in its first week in the US and 287,000 that same week worldwide. In the United States, So-Called Chaos became Morissette's first album to miss the number-one spot. It spent a week in the US top ten before falling down the chart. As of March 2012, the album has sold 474,000 copies in the US. The second single outside the US was "Out Is Through", which had a poor showing in the UK. The second US single was "Eight Easy Steps", which, despite being accompanied by an elaborate music video, failed to chart on the Hot 100 or cause a significant increase in sales of the album, which had already fallen off the Billboard 200. "Excuses" was released as a radio single in Brazil, where it peaked outside the top 40.

== Track listing ==
All tracks are written by Alanis Morissette.

No.	Title	Length
1.	"Eight Easy Steps"	2:52
2.	"Out Is Through"	3:52
3.	"Excuses"	3:32
4.	"Doth I Protest Too Much"	4:03
5.	"Knees of My Bees"	3:38
6.	"So-Called Chaos"	5:03
7.	"Not All Me"	3:58
8.	"This Grudge"	5:07
9.	"Spineless"	4:15
10.	"Everything"	4:36
Total length:		41:05

Enhanced content
No.	Title	Length
11.	"Eight Easy Steps" (live from sessions@AOL)
12.	"Excuses" (live from sessions@AOL)
13.	"This Grudge" (acoustic)
14.	"Making of So-Called Chaos" (video)

Brazilian edition hidden track
No.	Title	Length
11.	"Offer"	4:05
Total length:		45:10

== Personnel ==
- Alanis Morissette – vocals, producer, piano, keyboards, art direction
- Eric Avery – bass guitar
- Kenny Aronoff – drums
- Paul Bushnell – bass
- Scott Gordon – programming, engineer, drum programming
- Jamie Muhoberac – keyboards
- Tim Thorney – acoustic guitar, electric guitar, bass, piano, keyboards, producer
- Joel Shearer – acoustic guitar, bouzouki, guitar, electric guitar
- Paul Livingstone – sitar
- John Shanks – guitar, bass, keyboards, producer
- Zac Rae – piano, keyboards, vibraphone
- David Levita – acoustic guitar, electric guitar
- Jeff Rothschild – programming, engineer
- Jason Orme – electric guitar
- Blair Sinta – drums, programming

Technical

- Mark Valentine – engineer
- Bill Lane, Kevin Mills, Errin Familia, Rich Tosi, Jason Wormer – assistant engineer
- Chris Lord-Alge – mixing
- Stephen Marcussen – mastering
- Frank Maddocks – art direction, design
- Shari Sutcliffe – project coordinator
- Sheryl Nields – photography

== Charts ==
=== Weekly charts ===
Weekly chart performance for So-Called Chaos
Chart (2004)	Peak position
Australian Albums (ARIA)	15
Austrian Albums (Ö3 Austria)	1
Belgian Albums (Ultratop Flanders)	13
Belgian Albums (Ultratop Wallonia)	8
Canadian Albums (Billboard)	2
Danish Albums (Hitlisten)	24
Dutch Albums (Album Top 100)	1
European Albums (Billboard)	1
Finnish Albums (Suomen virallinen lista)	20
French Albums (SNEP)	5
German Albums (Offizielle Top 100)	1
Irish Albums (IRMA)	15
Italian Albums (FIMI)	4
Japanese Albums (Oricon)	13
Norwegian Albums (VG-lista)	2
Portuguese Albums (AFP)	9
Scottish Albums (OCC)	12
South African Albums (RISA)	18
Spanish Albums (PROMUSICAE)	14
Swedish Albums (Sverigetopplistan)	10
Swiss Albums (Schweizer Hitparade)	2
UK Albums (OCC)	8
US Billboard 200	5

=== Year-end charts ===
2004 year-end chart performance for So-Called Chaos
Chart (2004)	Position
Austrian Albums (Ö3 Austria)	21
Dutch Albums (Album Top 100)	68
German Albums (Offizielle Top 100)	28
Swiss Albums (Schweizer Hitparade)	23
US Billboard 200	188

=== Singles ===
Year	Title	Chart positions						
Year	Title	CAN	US Hot 100	US Hot 100 Airplay	US Adult Top 40	US Top 40/Pop	UK	AUS
2004	"Everything"	3	76	75	4	36	22	15
2004	"Out Is Through"	—	—	—	—	—	56	79
2004	"Eight Easy Steps"	—	—	—	27	—	—	—

=== Other charts ===
Single	Chart (2004)	Peak position
"Everything"	Italian Singles Chart	6
"Everything"	Austrian Singles Chart	12
"Everything"	Norwegian Singles Chart	17
"Everything"	Swiss Singles Chart	22

Single	Chart (2004)	Peak position
"Everything"
"Everything"	Irish Singles Chart	26
"Everything"	German Singles Chart	29
"Everything"	French Singles Chart	63
"Out Is Through"	UK Singles Chart	56
"Out Is Through"	Swiss Singles Chart	67
"Out Is Through"	German Singles Chart	75
"Eight Easy Steps"	US Billboard Hot Dance Music/Club Play^{1}	9

^{1} Remixes

== Certifications ==
Certifications and sales for So-Called Chaos
Region	Certification	Certified units/sales
Austria (IFPI Austria)	Gold	15,000^{*}
Brazil (Pro-Música Brasil)	Gold	50,000^{*}
Germany (BVMI)	Gold	100,000^{^}
Switzerland (IFPI Switzerland)	Platinum	40,000^{^}
United Kingdom (BPI)	Silver	60,000^{^}
United States	—	474,000
^{*} Sales figures based on certification alone.^{^} Shipments figures based on certification alone.
