= Alanis (album) =

Studio album by Alanis Morissette
- Released: April 17, 1991 (Canada)
- Recorded: September–December 1990
- Studio: Distortion Studios (Ottawa)
- Genre: Dance-pop
- Length: 40:44
- Labels: MCA Canada; Hot Mustard
- Producer: Leslie Howe

Alanis Morissette chronology
Alanis (1991)	Now Is the Time (1992)

Singles from Alanis
- 1. "Too Hot" Released: 1991 (Canada); 2. "Walk Away" Released: 1991 (Canada); 3. "Feel Your Love" Released: 1991 (Canada)

Professional ratings
Review scores
Source	Rating
Christopher Thelen, Daily Vault	C+
Rock and Roll Rarity	negative

Alanis is the debut studio album by Alanis Morissette, released only in Canada on April 17, 1991, by MCA Records Canada. Morissette recorded the album with Leslie Howe, who also produced her second album Now Is the Time (1992), and it was certified platinum.

== Background and recording ==
John Alexander, head of A&R for MCA Records Canada, first heard a demo tape from Morissette in 1983, when she was nine years old. He called it "very promising. Her voice was very strong, and it was remarkable that the tape included some original songs written by her at that age." However, he decided not to sign her to a record deal because "from an A&R standpoint, I said, 'What am I going to do with a nine-year-old?'" In 1987, Morissette met entertainment manager Stephan Klovan, and at the 1988 World Cup of Figure Skating, she recorded a well-received version of "O Canada" with two musicians, one of whom was Leslie Howe of the new wave/synthpop duo One to One. Klovan intended for Howe to work with Morissette so that she could audition on the television show Star Search, but eventually both he and Howe decided to try to secure a record contract for her. She did appear on Star Search in 1990, having auditioned more than once.

One of the demo recordings Howe and Morissette created with keyboardist Serge Côté in the studio was "Walk Away", for which Howe and Klovan funded an expensive promotional video that was filmed in Paris, France. In 1988 Howe sent the video to Alexander, who later arranged a dinner meeting with Morissette. "I could tell that she was a very focused and passionate 14-year-old girl, who was also very talented", Alexander said. "I felt strongly that we could work together to build her music career." The next day he met Morissette and her parents and told them he wanted to sign her, but MCA Records did not endorse this decision. Leeds Levy, president of MCA Publishing in North America, thought that Morissette had talent and agreed to sign her to a publishing deal as well as help fund a record deal for her. MCA Publishing financed the album through Hot Mustard Records, its new independent label for the development of new artists, and MCA Records distributed it. The album was recorded in Distortion Studios, Ottawa between September and December 1990.

According to Morissette, people from MCA placed "hardcore" pressure on her to lose weight in time for the album's release, leading her to develop anorexia nervosa and bulimia. She subsequently began therapy, which she called "a long process to un-program [my brain]. I try to remember, whatever my body is, it's perfect the way it is." She also revealed she would often go straight from school to the studios where she would stay until 3 or 4 am and write/record music, drink alcohol, smoke marijuana, and hang out with what she called "the older crowd".

== Release and legacy ==
Alanis was released in April 1991 to mixed reviews, and the media drew comparisons between Morissette and other teen pop singers at the time such as Debbie Gibson and Tiffany. Its first single, "Too Hot", reached number 14 on the Canadian singles chart and, in July, peaked within the top ten on contemporary hit radio. CBC called the song "Paula Abdul-inspired", and the Arizona Daily Wildcat described it as "cheesy" and "poppy". "Feel Your Love" was released as a single during this period, and the CRIA certified the album gold. Alanis reached number 25 on the Canadian album chart, and two other singles were released: "Walk Away", the video for which featured Matt LeBlanc, and "Plastic". At the 1992 Juno Awards "Too Hot" received nominations for "Single of the Year" and "Best Dance Recording" (for the "Hott Shot" remix), and Morissette won the award for "Most Promising Female Vocalist". The album went on to sell over 200,000 copies, though Morissette's popularity experienced a backlash at her high school, where her version of "O Canada" was played over the PA system every morning.

Time magazine said the album "brought [Morissette] modest renown ... (one presumes) among people [in Canada] who don't read lyric sheets", while Rolling Stone described it as "vaguely Madonna-esque dance-pop" and "fairly generic". The Kansas City Star labelled it "a faux Janet Jackson album", and Spin magazine wrote, "It's as if her high school yearbook picture came to life and made an album designed to haunt her forever. Sometimes cheese is Velveeta." In 1995 Morissette released her international debut album Jagged Little Pill through U.S. label Maverick Records. Executives at Maverick persuaded MCA Records to withdraw all copies of Alanis and Now Is the Time from circulation, and they did not mention either album in the promotional material for Jagged Little Pill. According to Spin, Morissette's transformation from "the Debbie Gibson of Canada" to an alternative rock musician made some Canadians skeptical. As of 2008 Alanis is officially out of print, but some pirates and MP3s have circulated.

Morissette said of Alanis and Now Is the Time, "I'm not scared people might hear these records. I never did Playboy centrefolds. There's nothing I regret. Maybe people will just understand that my lyrics are from different experiences if they hear those records. It validates [Jagged Little Pill] ... There was an element of me not being who I really was at the time and I'm now more experienced with my life. It was because I wasn't prepared to open up that way. The focus for me then was entertaining people and getting my feet wet in the business, it was about being young & having fun as opposed to sharing any revelations I had at the time. I had them, but I wasn't prepared or comfortable with sharing it." She considered including material from both albums on her 2005 compilation The Collection, but she was talked out of it and decided against it, citing the genres dance/pop wouldn't match other material from her current discography, also "it was right around when I was 19 and Jagged Little Pill where I first felt writing was a channelled experience. That has a lot to do with where I was at then, with having met Glen Ballard, with my moving from Canada and moving away from any preconceived notions of how songs 'should' be written. It was the beginning of a new way to approach songwriting altogether."

== Track listing ==
No.	Title	Writer(s)	Length
1.	"Feel Your Love" (Some releases included a longer version. Run-time: 4:15)	Morissette; Leslie Howe	3:50
2.	"Too Hot"	Morissette; Howe	4:00
3.	"Plastic"	Morissette; Howe; Serge Côté	3:45
4.	"Walk Away"	Morissette; Howe; Louise Reny; Frank Levin	4:50
5.	"On My Own"	Morissette; Howe; Côté	4:08
6.	"Superman"	Morissette; Howe	4:32
7.	"Jealous"	Morissette; Howe; Côté	3:55
8.	"Human Touch"	Morissette; Howe; Reny; Levin	3:23
9.	"Oh Yeah!"	Morissette; Howe	3:58
10.	"Party Boy"	Morissette; Howe	4:20
Total length:			40:44

== Personnel ==
- Alanis Morissette – vocals
- Leslie Howe – production, engineering, mixing, drum programming, guitar, additional keyboards
- Serge Côté – keyboards
- Frank "Fish" Levin – production on "Human Touch", keyboard solo on "Too Hot", extra strings arrangement on "On My Own"
- Chad Morissette – backing vocals on "Feel Your Love" and "Too Hot"
- Wade Morissette – backing vocals on "Feel Your Love" and "Too Hot"
- Tyley Ross – backing vocals on "Feel Your Love" and "Too Hot"
- John & Peter (The "Burn Bros.") – backing vocals on "Feel Your Love" and "Too Hot"
- Tom "Sloppy" Saidak – backing vocals on "Feel Your Love" and "Too Hot"
- Kevin "Iceman" Little – backing vocals on "Feel Your Love" and "Too Hot"
- Dan "Capt. Pin" – backing vocals on "Feel Your Love" and "Too Hot"
- Deane Josh Lovejoy – backing vocals on "Feel Your Love" and "Too Hot"
- Sean Daley – backing vocals on "Feel Your Love" and "Too Hot"
- Jenny "Frank #1" Parlier – backing vocals on "Feel Your Love" and "Too Hot"
- Mr. Fish – backing vocals on "Feel Your Love" and "Too Hot"
- Sal – backing vocals on "Feel Your Love" and "Too Hot"
- Rick "Slick" Kumar – on "Feel Your Love" and "Too Hot"
- Martin Soldat – art direction, design
- Dimo Safari – photography

== Charts ==
Chart (1991)	Peak position
Canada Top Albums/CDs (RPM)	28

== Certifications and sales ==
Region	Certification	Certified units/sales
Canada (Music Canada)	Platinum	100,000^{^}
^{^} Shipments figures based on certification alone.
