= Everything (Alanis Morissette song) =

2004 single by Alanis Morissette

Single by Alanis Morissette

from the album So-Called Chaos
- B-side: "So Unsexy" (Vancouver Sessions); "Everything" (Vancouver Sessions); "Precious Illusions" (Vancouver Sessions)
- Released: March 22, 2004
- Genre: Alternative rock
- Length: 4:36 (album version); 3:30 (radio edit)
- Label: Maverick; Reprise
- Songwriter: Alanis Morissette
- Producers: Alanis Morissette; John Shanks; Tim Thorney

Alanis Morissette singles chronology
"So Unsexy" (2003)	"Everything" (2004)	"Out Is Through" (2004)

Music video
- "Everything" on YouTube

"Everything" is a song written and performed by Canadian singer Alanis Morissette. It was released on March 22, 2004, as the first single from her sixth studio album, So-Called Chaos (2004), on which it appears as the closing track. The song reached number three on the Canadian Singles Chart and number six in Italy and Spain. Although it reached only number 76 on the US Billboard Hot 100, it peaked atop the Billboard Triple-A chart and climbed to number four on the Billboard Adult Top 40. "Everything" also reached the top 20 in Australia, Austria, Norway, and Scotland.

== Release and reception ==
"Everything" (2004)

A heavily edited version of the song was released to radio stations for airplay on February 23, 2004. The radio version removed over 60 seconds of the track by taking the first two lines from the first section of a verse and placing it together with the last two lines from the second section of the verse, effectively removing a whole verse from the album version. The video version of the track endured further edits, with the replacing of the word "asshole" in the opening line to "nightmare."

Upon release in the US, the song received considerable support and airplay from alternative and adult radio stations, peaking within the top five and spending 26 non-consecutive weeks on Billboard's Adult Top 40 chart. Mainstream pop and rock radio stations were less supportive of the track. The song entered Billboard's main Hot 100 chart at number 76, a position it would hold for four weeks, spending a total of nine non-consecutive weeks on the chart. The physical video-enhanced single, however, remains one of the most successful of Morissette's recording career, being certified 4× Platinum by the RIAA on September 30, 2004, for shipment of over 200,000 copies. The song also peaked within the top 20 of the Canadian, Australian, Italian, Austrian, Norwegian, and Scottish singles charts.

== Music video ==
The song's music video was directed by Meiert Avis and was released in March 2004, and features Morissette walking down a road. A man eventually walks up to her and cuts two long pieces of her hair, and when he leaves she is sporting a very short hairstyle; at the time the video was shot Morissette had cut her previously long hair and the scene was shot with her wearing a wig.

The music video is based on and is almost identical to the video for the song "Bonito" by Spanish group Jarabe de Palo, with the same director, Marc Donés. The man that cuts her hair at the beginning of the video is Jarabe de Palo's lead singer, Pau Donés. Three of the people who were seen singing in her "Hands Clean" video also appear who are shown as her dedicated fans. The video peaked at number four on the VH1 Top 20 Video Countdown. It also features Canadian actor Chris William Martin.

== Track listings ==
Canadian, European, and Australian CD single; UK CD1

1. "Everything" (radio edit) – 3:31
2. "So Unsexy" (Vancouver Sessions) – 5:03
3. "Everything" (Vancouver Sessions) – 4:42
4. "Everything" (video)

UK CD2

1. "Everything" (radio edit) – 3:30
2. "Precious Illusions" (Vancouver Sessions) – 4:32

== Charts ==
=== Weekly charts ===
Weekly chart performance for "Everything"
Chart (2004)	Peak position
Australia (ARIA)	15
Austria (Ö3 Austria Top 40)	12
Belgium (Ultratip Bubbling Under Flanders)	4
Belgium (Ultratip Bubbling Under Wallonia)	6
Canada (Nielsen SoundScan)	3
Canada CHR (Nielsen BDS)	15
Canada CHR/Pop Top 30 (Radio & Records)	16
Canada Hot AC Top 30 (Radio & Records)	2
Croatia (HRT)	7
Europe (Eurochart Hot 100)	20
France (SNEP)	63
Germany (GfK)	29
Greece (IFPI)	47
Ireland (IRMA)	26
Italy (FIMI)	6
Netherlands (Dutch Top 40 Tipparade)	2
Netherlands (Single Top 100)	43
Norway (VG-lista)	17
Paraguay (Notimex)	5
Scotland Singles (Official Charts)	19
Spain (Promusicae)	6
Switzerland (Schweizer Hitparade)	22
UK Singles (Official Charts)	22
US Billboard Hot 100	76
US Adult Alternative Airplay (Billboard)	1
US Adult Pop Airplay (Billboard)	4

=== Year-end charts ===
Year-end chart performance for "Everything"
Chart (2004)	Position
US Adult Top 40 (Billboard)	20
US Triple-A (Billboard)	16

== Certifications ==
Certifications for "Everything"
Region	Certification	Certified units/sales
United States (RIAA) Video single	4× Platinum	200,000^{^}
^{^} Shipments figures based on certification alone.

== Release history ==
Release dates and formats for "Everything"
Region	Date	Format(s)	Label(s)	Ref.
United States	March 22, 2004	Hot adult contemporary; triple A radio	Maverick; Reprise	
Australia	May 10, 2004	CD	Maverick	
United Kingdom	May 10, 2004	CD	Maverick	
United States	June 1, 2004	Contemporary hit radio	Maverick; Reprise	
