= The Prayer Cycle =

Studio album by Jonathan Elias featuring various artists
- Released: March 23, 1999 (U.S.)
- Genre: Choral
- Length: 51:29
- Label: Sony Classical
- Producer: Jonathan Elias, R. Walt Vincent

Professional ratings
Review scores
Source	Rating
Melody Maker	3/5 stars

The Prayer Cycle is a choral/orchestral album by American film and television composer Jonathan Elias. The album was released by Sony Classical Records in the United States on March 23, 1999.

The project, recorded and mixed by co-producer R. Walt Vincent, consists of a nine-part contemporary choral symphony in thirteen languages (Hungarian, Mali, Swahili, Dwala, Tibetan, German, French, Urdu, Latin, English, Italian, Hebrew, and Spanish). In the album's liner notes, Elias described the work as "a set of nine adagio prayers" that were influenced by his "personal views" about the future of humankind and the power of prayer across cultures. The contributing musical artists "used poems [he] wrote as inspiration, interpreting the words in their own way, in many different languages and chants."

The featured vocalists were Alanis Morissette, Salif Keita, Perry Farrell, Richard Bona, Yungchen Lhamo, Liz Constantine, Nusrat Fateh Ali Khan, Mah Damba, James Taylor, Ofra Haza, and Linda Ronstadt. The featured instrumentalists were John Williams (guitar), Martin Tillman (processed cello), and Ethan James (hurdy gurdy). The featured artists were accompanied by The English Chamber Orchestra & Chorus, conducted by Lawrence Schwartz, and The American Boychoir, featuring Devin Provenzano.

Music from The Prayer Cycle was featured on the 1999 ABC documentary series called "The Century," which aired in six parts on March 29 and on April 1, 3, 5, 8 and 10.

The Prayer Cycle was played in its entirety for two Music from the Hearts of Space programs, "The Prayer Cycle" (program 536, originally aired September 10, 1999) and again as "Terror and Hope" (program 605, originally aired September 21, 2001) in response to the September 11, 2001 attacks.

The entire work received its first live performance on April 28, 2013 when it was performed by the Branford High School choir at Woolsey Hall in New Haven, Connecticut. The piece was conducted by choir director Cathyann Roding and performed by the choir (including featured soloists) and a 45-piece orchestra.

== Track listing ==
All information appears as indicated in the album's liner notes.

Track number	Title	Performer(s)	Language(s)	Length
1	"Mercy"	Alanis Morissette, Salif Keita, and The English Chamber Orchestra & Chorus	Hungarian, Mali, and Swahili	3:43
2	"Strength"	Perry Farrell, Richard Bona, Yungchen Lhamo, Liz Constantine, The American Boychoir, and The English Chamber Orchestra & Chorus	Dwala, Tibetan, and German	5:40
3	"Hope"	Alanis Morissette and The American Boychoir featuring Devin Provenzano	French	6:38
4	"Compassion"	Nusrat Fateh Ali Khan, Mah Damba, and The English Chamber Orchestra & Chorus	Urdu, Mali, and Latin	6:56
5	"Grace"	James Taylor, John Williams, and The English Chamber Orchestra & Chorus	English and Italian	5:54
6	"Innocence"	Salif Keita, Alanis Morissette, and The English Chamber Orchestra & Chorus	Mali and French	5:58
7	"Forgiveness"	Nusrat Fateh Ali Khan, Ofra Haza, Martin Tillman, Ethan James, and The English Chamber Orchestra & Chorus	Urdu, Hebrew, and French	7:40
8	"Benediction"	Linda Ronstadt, Nusrat Fateh Ali Khan, Martin Tillman, The American Boychoir featuring Devin Provenzano, and The English Chamber Orchestra & Chorus	Spanish, Urdu, and German	7:59
9	"Faith"	Alanis Morissette, Nusrat Fateh Ali Khan, and The English Chamber Orchestra & Chorus	Hungarian, Urdu, and German	1:01
