= Now Is the Time =

Studio album by Alanis Morissette
- Released: October 20, 1992 (Canada)
- Recorded: January–May 1992
- Studio: Distortion Studios (Ottawa)
- Genre: Pop; teen pop; dance-pop
- Length: 42:28
- Label: MCA Records Canada; Hot Mustard Records
- Producer: Leslie Howe

Alanis Morissette chronology
Alanis (1991)	Now Is the Time (1992)	Jagged Little Pill (1995)

Singles from Now Is the Time
- 1. "An Emotion Away" Released: 25 November 1992; 2. "No Apologies" Released: 3 February 1993; 3. "Real World" Released: 31 May 1993; 4. "(Change Is) Never a Waste of Time" Released: 21 September 1993

Professional ratings
Review scores
Source	Rating
Rock and Roll Rarity	(mixed)

Now Is the Time is the second studio album by Alanis Morissette, released only in Canada on October 20, 1992. It was her final album for MCA Records Canada. Morissette recorded the album with Leslie Howe, who produced her debut album, Alanis (1991).

== Legacy ==
In 1995, Morissette released her Grammy-winning, internationally acclaimed album Jagged Little Pill through U.S. label Maverick Records. Executives at Maverick persuaded MCA Records to withdraw all copies of Alanis and Now Is the Time from circulation, and they did not mention either album in the promotional material for Jagged Little Pill. According to Spin magazine, Morissette's transformation from "the Debbie Gibson of Canada" to an alternative rock musician made some Canadians skeptical. As with Alanis, Now Is the Time is no longer in print. Morissette's contract with MCA expired after the release of the album, and she said "It was kind of a blessing that it was over, because I wanted to start out with a clean slate, not only personally but career-wise, too." Time called the album "uninspired", and the song "Rain" "wistful", while The Kansas City Star labelled it "a lightweight faux Madonna album".

Morissette said of Alanis and Now Is the Time, "...I'm not scared people might hear these records. I never did Playboy centerfolds. There's nothing I regret. Maybe people will just understand that my lyrics are from different experiences if they hear those records. It validates [Jagged Little Pill] ... There was an element of me not being who I really was at the time and now I'm more experienced with my life. It was because I wasn't prepared to open up that way. The focus for me then was entertaining people and getting my feet wet in the business, it was about being young & having fun as opposed to sharing any revelations I had at the time. I had them, but I wasn't prepared or comfortable with sharing them."

She considered including material from both albums on her 2005 compilation The Collection, but she was talked out of this and decided against it, citing that the genres dance/pop would not match other material from her current discography, explaining: "It was right around when I was 19 and Jagged Little Pill where I first felt writing was a channeled experience. That has a lot to do with where I was at then, with having met Glen Ballard, with my moving from Canada and moving away from any preconceived notions of how songs 'should' be written. It was the beginning of a new way to approach songwriting altogether."

== Track listing ==
All tracks are written by Alanis Morissette, Leslie Howe and Serge Côté.

No.	Title	Length
1.	"Real World"	4:57
2.	"An Emotion Away"	4:14
3.	"Rain"	3:52
4.	"The Time of Your Life"	4:45
5.	"No Apologies"	5:02
6.	"Can't Deny"	3:55
7.	"When We Meet Again"	4:10
8.	"Give What You Got"	4:56
9.	"(Change Is) Never a Waste of Time"	4:40
10.	"Big Bad Love"	4:14
Total length:		42:28

== Personnel ==
- Leslie Howe – producer, engineer, mixing
- Dan Seguin – cover photography
- Andrew LeBlanc – photography
- Martin Solort – design
- John Alexander – A&R direction

== Certifications ==
Region	Certification	Certified units/sales
Canada (Music Canada)	Gold	50,000^{^}
^{^} Shipments figures based on certification alone.
