= Leslie Howe =

Canadian musician

- Born: April 17, 1959 (age 67); Ottawa, Ontario, Canada
- Occupations: musician, record producer
- Musical career
- Genres: Pop, alternative rock
- Years active: 1980s–present

Leslie Howe (born April 17, 1959) is a Canadian musician and record producer based in Ottawa, Ontario. He has been a member of the bands One to One, Sal's Birdland and Artificial Joy Club, and produced Alanis Morissette's early pop music albums.

== Career ==
Beginning in the 1970s, Howe and Louise Reny were members of a local Ottawa band Mainstream. Howe operated a small recording studio, Distortion Studios, in Ottawa. In 1984, Howe joined with Reny to create the duo One to One; they signed a recording contract with the British label Bonaire, and travelled to Germany to record an album, Forward Your Emotions. Howe was nominated for Producer of the Year and "Recording Engineer of the Year" at the 1986 Juno Awards for this album. The pair released a single, "Do You Believe" which appeared on the RPM 100 Singles chart in June and July 1989. After changing their name to One 2 One, they recorded an album with A&M Records; their 1992 single "Peace of Mind (Love Goes On)" appeared on the RPM 100 Singles Chart for several months.

Howe met Alanis Morissette in 1988 and the two began writing songs together; Morissette signed a contract with Howe's production company, Ghettovale, and with the help of Remy and musician Frank Levin, they recorded a demonstration video with Morissette singing one of these compositions, "Walk Away". The demo led to a recording contract for her with MCA Records. Howe produced her first pop music albums Alanis (1991) and Now Is the Time (1992).

Howe joined the grunge band Sal's Birdland, once more with Reny; in 1993 the group independently released an album, So Very Happy, and later released Nude Photos Inside through MCA Records. After changing their name to Artificial Joy Club, in 1997 the band recorded a single, "Sick and Beautiful", which climbed the Billboard charts. Also that year the band recorded an album, Melt, on the Crunchy/Interscope label, were showcased on MTV and performed as part of the Lollapalooza tour.
