= Holly Dodson =

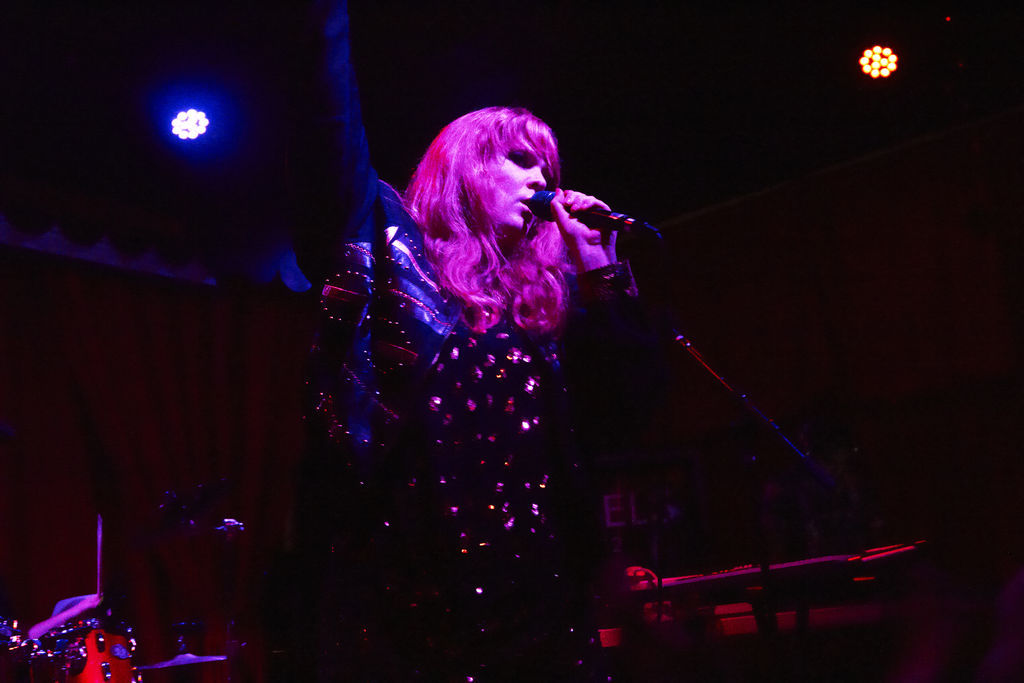
- Holly Dodson performing with Parallels in Tucson, Arizona, in August 2012.

Background information
- Born: Toronto, Ontario, Canada
- Genres: Synthpop, pop, electronic
- Occupations: Musician, composer, producer
- Instruments: Voice, piano, synthesizer
- Years active: 2007–present
- Label: The Marigold Label Lakeshore Records
- Website: iloveparallels.com

Holly Dodson is a Canadian singer-songwriter, composer, and music producer who is a co-founding member and front-woman of synthpop group Parallels.

== Early life ==
Dodson is the daughter of Juno Award-winning guitarist (of The Stampeders), composer, and producer Rich Dodson and sister of Canadian musician Nick Dodson. At the age of six, Dodson's began traveling with her family and her father's band during the band's reunion tour in 1992. Dodson's upbringing was heavily influenced by music, spending time in her father's 24-track recording studio, Marigold Studios in Toronto. She began writing songs at the age of sixteen and recorded a 12-song album The Carousel, which was never formally released.

== Parallels ==
Dodson co-wrote Parallels' debut album Visionaries, and is the primary producer of the band's new material. Dodson was deemed one of the "Hottest Names to Know in Canadian Music" in Flare's 30th Anniversary Issue.
