= Kim Berly =

Canadian drummer (born 1948)

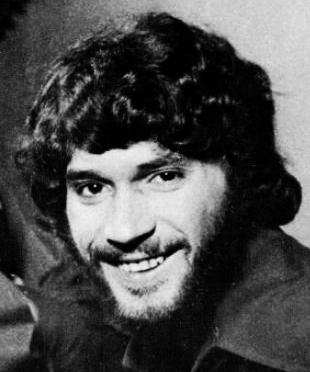

Background information
- Born: Kimberly Meyer; July 24, 1948 (age 77); Alberta, Canada
- Genres: Rock, folk
- Instrument: Drums
- Years active: 1964–present
- Member of: The Stampeders

Kimberly Meyer (born July 24, 1948), known professionally as Kim Berly, is a Canadian drummer. He is best known for being one third of the classic lineup of the folk rock trio The Stampeders.

== Biography ==
Berly started playing drums at the age of fifteen after seeing a rock band performing live at a community center in Calgary in summer of 1963. After a few weeks of playing the drums on pots and pans, his parents bought him his first drum kit.

Berly formed The Stampeders with guitarist Rich Dodson and Berly's brother Al Meyer (under the name Race Holiday) on vocals. By 1968, the once six-piece band was a trio by 1968 consisting of Berly, Dodson and bassist Ronnie King, a friend of Berly's who he recruited. The band were popular on the Canadian charts in the 1970s and in 1971 had a North American hit with "Sweet City Woman". Berly sang backing and lead vocals occasionally.

Berly now lives in Vernon, British Columbia with his wife Lori.
