= Ronnie King (The Stampeders) =

American musician (1947–2024)

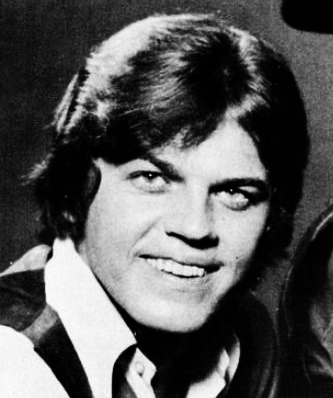

Background information
- Also known as: Ronnie King
- Born: Cornelis Van Sprang; August 1, 1947; Rotterdam, Netherlands
- Died: March 4, 2024 (aged 76) Alberta, Canada
- Genres: Rock, folk
- Instruments: Bass, guitar, vocals
- Years active: 1960s–2024
- Formerly of: The Stampeders

Cornelis Van Sprang (August 1, 1947 – March 4, 2024), known professionally as Ronnie King, was a Dutch-Canadian musician. He was one third of the classic lineup of The Stampeders.

== Early life ==
Cornelis Van Sprang was born in Rotterdam, Netherlands, the middle of five children. His family moved to Calgary, Canada in 1955. One of King's front teeth was knocked out as a young man and had an "ill-fitted plate" put over it.

== Career ==
One of King's first bands, The Paint Brushes, was on a local television show, hosted by Mel Shaw, who later managed the Stampeders. His Stampeders bandmate Kim Berly claims to have seen his television appearance before the two first met. King, and his brother Emil Van Sprang (aka Von Louis), joined The Stampeders in early 1965. Emil was a vocalist (and the person who chose the band name) and Ronnie was originally the guitarist, before moving to bass.

They were originally a six-piece, but by 1968 the band was a trio consisting of King on bass, Rich Dodson on guitar and vocals and Kim Berly on drums. Throughout the 1970s, The Stampeders had many charting hits on the Canadian charts, but their only chart hit in the USA was "Sweet City Woman", which got to number eight in 1971. The song won numerous Juno Awards in 1972.

The band broke up in 1980, and King returned to Canada from the United States and formed The Ronnie King Band. The band reunited in 1992 after a "Where are they now?" episode on television about the Stampeders aired, featuring Dodson and Berly, King was also on the show but his appearance was kept secret from the other two members as they had not spoken since 1977. The three got to talking again and reformed the band.

== Personal life ==
He was married to Cindy Van Sprang from 1996 to 2003, but they remained close friends. They had a daughter, Zoe, born in 1999 who is also a singer. King had four children (Teresa Van Sprang, Kevin Van Sprang (deceased), Debbie Van Sprang (deceased), Zoe Van Sprang) six grandchildren (Clover Roy, Alyccia Gallagher, Aura Mckay, Karma McKay, Max Butcher, Layna Butcher) and five great-grandchildren (Ashlynn Roy, Dylan Roy, Logan Roy, Vienna Gallagher, Hazel Gallagher); he reportedly became a grandfather at the age of thirty-three. King regretted constantly touring in the 1970s as it prevented him from raising his first three children.

== Death ==
King died at Peter Lougheed Hospital in Alberta on March 4, 2024, at the age of 76. He died while the band were touring, but they decided to carry on, rename the tour to "Rocking In Memory of Ronnie King", and recruited Dave Chabot as their new bass player.
