= Rich Dodson =

Canadian singer and guitarist

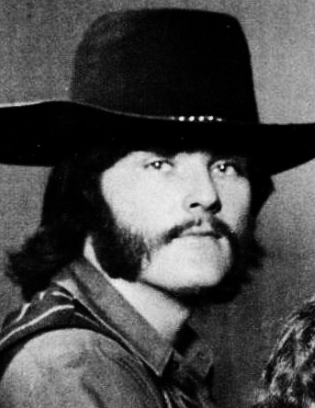
- Dodson in 1971

Background information
- Born: Richard Dodson; July 1, 1947 (age 78); Sudbury, Ontario, Canada
- Origin: Calgary, Alberta, Canada
- Genres: Rock
- Occupations: Musician, songwriter
- Instruments: Guitar, vocals
- Years active: 1964–present
- Label: Marigold Productions
- Website: thestampeders.com

Rich Dodson (born July 1, 1947) is a Canadian musician and songwriter who is the guitarist, vocalist and a founding member of the rock trio the Stampeders. On stage, he is known for playing his self-designed Fender double neck guitar.

== Early life ==
Dodson was born in Greater Sudbury, Ontario and spent the first year of his life there before his family moved to Alberta, British Columbia. His father worked as a boiler operator.

== Career ==
Dodson formed the Stampeders in 1964 with Kim Berly. Originally a six-piece band, by 1968 the band had been reduced to a trio consisting of Dodson, Berly and bassist Ronnie King. He is best known for penning the group's biggest hit, "Sweet City Woman", which hit number 1 in Canada and number 8 on the US Billboard in 1971. He also wrote other notable hits for the band such as "Wild Eyes" (1972), "Devil You" (1971), "Johnny Lightning" (1974) and "Carry Me" (1971).

Dodson left the Stampeders in 1978 to pursue his interests in music production and built his own 24-track recording studio called Marigold Studios: "I wanted the freedom, so when we bought the house, I built a 24-track studio [Marigold Studios] so that I was self-contained and independent."

There he produced his own solo material as well as producing and engineering "Fate Stay with Me" (1987) for Alanis Morissette. In that same year, he began his nationally distributed independent record label called Marigold Productions. Dodson went on to have a successful solo career with three top-ten hits in Canada including "Lookin' Back" (1981), "She's Comin' Back/Your Own Kind of Music" (1985), and "Cruel Emotion" (1986). Other artists he produced for include Buffy Sainte-Marie and Handsome Ned.

In 1992, Dodson re-united with his Stampeders bandmates after they filmed a "Where are they now?" show on television. The band continue to tour Canada doing fairs, festivals, casinos and theatres, and as of 2024 the band, still a trio, consists of Dodson, Berly and Dave Chabot who replaced the late Ronnie King. In 1994, Dodson released his solo songs on an album called Secret Hits on Aquarius Records.

== Personal life ==
Dodson lives with his wife, Mary-Lynn. His daughter, Holly Dodson, and son Nick Dodson are a singer-songwriter, and drummer respectively, and key members in the Canadian synth-pop trio Parallels (Nick is no longer a member of the group). Holly directed a new music video of "Sweet City Woman" for the Stampeders in 2016.

== Influences and recognition ==
Dodson has stated that his influences come from instrumental bands of the 1960s such as the Ventures and the Shadows, as well as Lovin' Spoonful and the Zombies.

In 1994, Dodson was inducted into the SOCAN Hall of Fame for composing "Sweet City Woman" and "Carry Me". In February 2006, Dodson was inducted into the Canadian Songwriters Hall of Fame with "Sweet City Woman".

== Discography ==
=== Singles ===
Year	Single	Chart Positions		
Year	Single	CAN	CAN AC	CAN Country
1972	"Julia Get Up"	11	—	—
1979	"Give You That Love"	79	23	—
1980	"Natalie"	—	16	—
1981	"Lookin' Back"	—	6	—
1982	"Hollywood"	—	20	—
1983	"That's What I Say"	—	22	—
1984	"If You Got a Heart"	—	17	—
1984	"Givin' It Up for Love"	—	16	—
1985	"No Time to Say Goodbye"	—	11	—
1985	"She's Comin' Back / Your Own Kind of Music"	—	8	—
1986	"Cruel Emotion"	—	10	40
1986	"Lonely Lovers" (with Debbie Johnson)	—	16	—
1988	"Holiday"	—	17	—
1990	"Cruel Emotion"	—	26	—
1991	"Love City"	—	19	—

== Stampeders songs written by Dodson ==
Year	Title
1967	"Morning Magic"
1968	"Be a Woman"
1969	"Crosswalk"
1971	"Carry Me"
1971	"Sweet City Woman"
1971	"Devil You"
1972	"Monday Morning Choo Choo"
1972	"Wild Eyes"
1973	"Johnny Lightning"
1974	"Running Wild"
1974	"Ramona"
1976	"San Diego"
1984	"Baby with You"
1996	"Oh Belinda"
1997	"Hometown Boy"
