= Nick Dodson =

Canadian musician

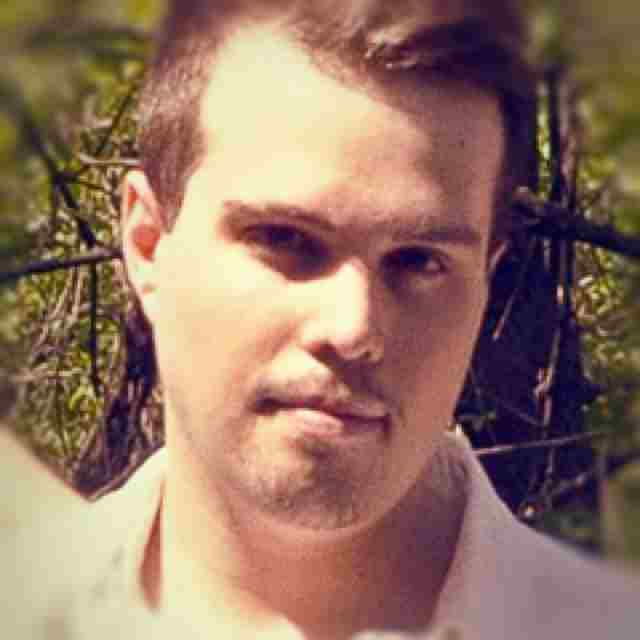

Nick Dodson is a Canadian musician. He is best known as the former drummer for the band Parallels. He is the son of Rich Dodson, composer and guitarist in 1970s Canadian rock band the Stampeders with their hit "Sweet City Woman".
