= Alanis Morissette =

Canadian and American singer-songwriter (born 1974)

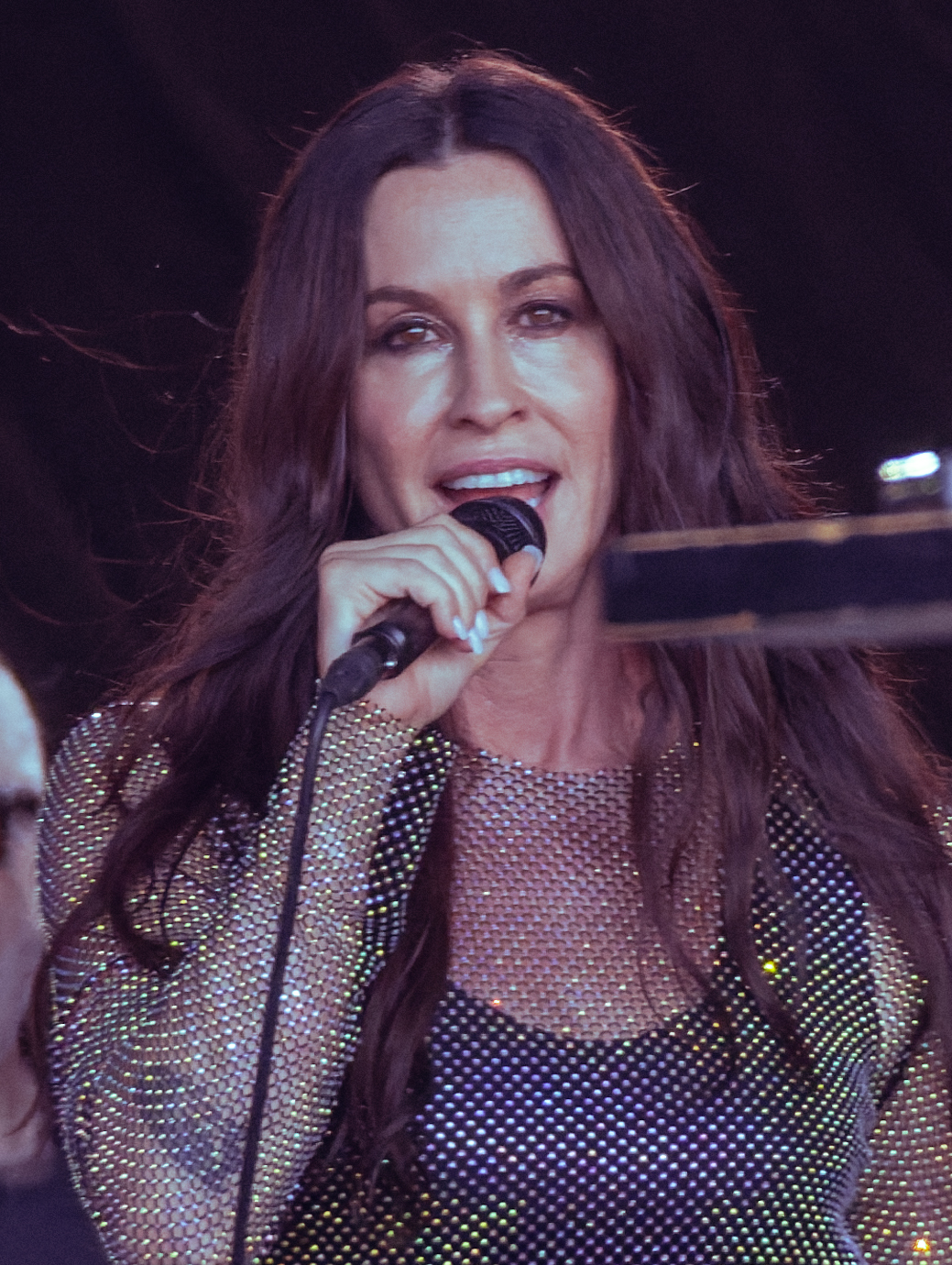
- Morissette in 2025
- Born: Alanis Nadine Morissette; June 1, 1974 (age 52); Ottawa, Ontario, Canada
- Citizenship: Canada; US (from 2005)
- Occupations: Singer-songwriter; record producer
- Years active: 1986–present
- Spouse: Mario Treadway (m. 2010)
- Partner: Ryan Reynolds (2002–2007)
- Children: 3
- Relatives: Wade Morissette (brother)
- Awards: Full list
- Musical career
- Genres: Rock; pop
- Instruments: Vocals; guitar
- Works: Discography; songs
- Labels: MCA Canada; Maverick; Reprise; Warner Bros.; Collective Sounds; Rough Trade; Epiphany Music
- Website: alanis.com

Alanis Nadine Morissette (/əˈlænɪs ˌmɒrɪˈsɛt/ ə-LAN-iss MORR-iss-ET; born June 1, 1974) is a Canadian and American singer-songwriter and record producer. Regarded as the "Queen of Alt-Rock Angst", she became a cultural phenomenon in the 1990s, gaining international fame for her emotive mezzo-soprano voice and confessional songwriting. She has sold more than 60 million records worldwide. Her accolades include seven Grammy Awards, a Brit Award, 14 Juno Awards, and nominations for two Golden Globe Awards and a Tony Award. In 2005, she was inducted into Canada's Walk of Fame, and in 2026, she was inducted into the Songwriters Hall of Fame.

Morissette began her music career in Canada in the early 1990s with two dance-pop albums, Alanis (1991) and Now Is the Time (1992). After relocating to Los Angeles, she released the alternative rock album Jagged Little Pill (1995), which became one of the best-selling albums of all time and has appeared on several all-time lists. She won five Grammy Awards for the record including Album of the Year, becoming the youngest winner of the category at the time. She continued this success with her next album Supposed Former Infatuation Junkie (1998), which saw her adapt an experimental sound and was highly anticipated. That same year, her single "Uninvited" for City of Angels won two Grammy Awards and was nominated for the Golden Globe Award for Best Original Song.

Beginning in 2002, Morissette took on further creative control and production duties as the sole producer of her fifth album, Under Rug Swept, which won her the Jack Richardson Producer of the Year Award. Her 2005 song "Wunderkind" for The Chronicles of Narnia: The Lion, the Witch and the Wardrobe netted her a second nomination for the Golden Globe for Best Original Song. She has continued her career with the albums So-Called Chaos (2004), Flavors of Entanglement (2008), Havoc and Bright Lights (2012), and Such Pretty Forks in the Road (2020), and The Storm Before the Calm (2022). Her most-recent album, the Christmas record Good Weather for Immaculate Conception, was released in 2026.

Morissette holds the record for the most number ones on the weekly Billboard Alternative Songs chart among female soloists, group leaders, or duo members. Her first three internationally released studio albums topped the Billboard 200 albums chart, and her next four albums peaked within the top 20. Her singles "You Oughta Know", "Hand in My Pocket", "Ironic", "You Learn", "Head Over Feet", "Uninvited", "Thank U", and "Hands Clean", reached top 40 in major charts around the world.

== Early life and education ==
Alanis Nadine Morissette was born on June 1, 1974, at Riverside Hospital in Ottawa, Ontario, the daughter of Georgia Mary Ann (née Feuerstein) and Alan Richard Morissette. She has two elder brothers: Chad, who is an entrepreneur, and her twin, Wade (born 12 minutes before her), who is a musician. Alan is of French and Irish descent, while Georgia, who fled Hungary during the anti-Soviet uprising in 1956, has Jewish ancestry. Morissette ethnically identifies as "a quarter Jewish". On a 2024 episode of the American documentary television series Finding Your Roots, she stated that her parents had never told their children about the family's Jewish ancestry and that she did not discover it until her late 20s.

In 1977, the family moved to Lahr, Baden-Württemberg, West Germany, and Alan and Georgia started working as teachers at the local Canadian Air Command base. They moved back to Ottawa in 1980, and Morissette started taking dance lessons the next year. She and her brothers had a Catholic upbringing, and attended church every Sunday while growing up. Morissette attended Holy Family Catholic School for elementary school and Immaculata High School for grades seven and eight. She appeared on five episodes of the children's television sketch comedy series You Can't Do That on Television (1986) while attending the former. She then attended and graduated from Glebe Collegiate Institute. Morissette began studying piano at age six and later took guitar lessons after graduating from high school.

== Career ==
=== 1986–1993: Alanis and Now Is the Time ===
Morissette is known for her emotive mezzo-soprano voice and confessional songwriting. She recorded her first demo called "Fate Stay with Me", produced by Lindsay Thomas Morgan at Marigold Studios in Toronto, and engineered by Rich Dodson of Canadian classic rock band The Stampeders. A second demo tape was recorded on cassette in August 1989 and sent to Geffen Records, but the tape has never been heard as it was stolen, among other records, in a burglary of the label's headquarters in October 1989.

In 1991, MCA Records Canada released Morissette's debut album, Alanis, in Canada only. She co-wrote every track on the album with its producer, Leslie Howe. The dance-pop album went platinum, and its first single, "Too Hot", reached the top 20 on the RPM singles chart. Subsequent singles "Walk Away" and "Feel Your Love" reached the top 40. Morissette's popularity, style of music and appearance, particularly that of her hair, led her to become known as the Debbie Gibson of Canada; comparisons to Tiffany were also common. During the same period, she was a concert opening act for rapper Vanilla Ice. She was nominated for three 1992 Juno Awards: Most Promising Female Vocalist of the Year (which she won), Single of the Year and Best Dance Recording (both for "Too Hot").

In 1992, Morisette released her second album, Now Is the Time, a ballad-driven record that featured less glitzy production than Alanis and contained more thoughtful lyrics. She wrote the songs with its producer, Leslie Howe, and Serge Côté. She said of the album, "People could go, 'Boo, hiss, hiss, this girl's like another Tiffany or whatever.' But the way I look at it... people will like your next album if it's a kick-ass one." As with Alanis, Now Is the Time was released only in Canada and produced three top 40 singles—"An Emotion Away", the minor adult contemporary hit "No Apologies" as well as "(Change Is) Never a Waste of Time". It sold only a little more than half the copies of her first album. She said MCA Canada dropped her thereafter as her musical identity was shifting in a direction that they were not interested in developing.

=== 1994–1999: Jagged Little Pill and Supposed Former Infatuation Junkie ===
In 1993, Morissette's publisher Leeds Levy at MCA Music Publishing introduced her to the manager Scott Welch. Welch told HitQuarters he was impressed by her "spectacular" voice, her character and her lyrics. At the time she was still living with her parents. Together they decided it would be best for her career to move to Toronto and start writing with other people. After graduating from high school, Morissette moved from Ottawa to Toronto. Her publisher funded part of her development and she spent her time there composing and rehearsing with a number of other musicians, looking to find a songwriting partner for her next album. Although a number of songs came out of these sessions, none would make an album cut and no lasting partnerships were formed.

After Morissette moved to Los Angeles, she met the producer and songwriter Glen Ballard, who believed in her talent enough to let her use his studio. They wrote songs together, with him supporting her sound rather than trying to shape or mold it to his own tastes. In her newfound freeness of creative spirit, they wrote and recorded Morissette's first internationally released album, Jagged Little Pill, and in 1995 she signed a deal with Maverick Records. According to Welch, every other label they approached declined to sign her.

"Ironic" (1996)
The song is considered one of Morissette's signature tunes. It was nominated for two Grammy Awards in 1997.

Maverick Records released Jagged Little Pill internationally in June 1995. It was expected only to sell enough for Morissette to make a follow-up, but the situation improved quickly when KROQ-FM, an influential Los Angeles modern rock radio station, began playing "You Oughta Know", the first single, featuring Flea and Dave Navarro from the Red Hot Chili Peppers. It also instantly garnered attention for its scathing, explicit lyrics, and a subsequent music video went into heavy rotation on MTV and MuchMusic. In a 2008 interview, Dave Coulier said he was the ex-boyfriend who inspired "You Oughta Know"; in the 2021 documentary Jagged, Morissette denied it is about him. In a 2019 appearance on Watch What Happens Live, Morissette mentioned that multiple people have taken credit for being the inspiration behind her song "You Oughta Know". She stated, "I just think: If you're going to take credit for a song where I'm singing about someone being a douche or an asshole, you might not want to say, 'Hey! That's me!'" She described the song as being written out of "devastation", reflecting a range of emotions that women often feel but are told to suppress, such as anger and sadness.

After the success of "You Oughta Know", the album's other hits helped send Jagged Little Pill to the top of the charts. "All I Really Want" and "Hand in My Pocket" followed, and the fourth U.S. single, "Ironic", became Morissette's biggest hit. "You Learn" and "Head over Feet", the fifth and sixth singles, kept Jagged Little Pill (1995) in the top 20 on the Billboard 200 albums chart for more than a year. Jagged Little Pill sold more than 16 million copies in the U.S.; it sold 33 million worldwide, making it the second biggest-selling album by a female artist (behind Shania Twain's Come On Over).

Morissette's popularity grew significantly in Canada, where the album was certified twelve times platinum and produced four RPM chart-toppers: "Hand in My Pocket", "Ironic", "You Learn", and "Head over Feet". The album was also a bestseller in Australia and the United Kingdom.

Morissette's success with Jagged Little Pill (1995) was credited with opening doors for female singers such as Fiona Apple, Meredith Brooks, Tracy Bonham, Patti Rothberg, Shakira, Natalie Imbruglia and later Pink and Avril Lavigne. Morissette and the album won five Juno Awards in 1996: Album of the Year, Single of the Year ("You Oughta Know"), Female Vocalist of the Year, Songwriter of the Year and Best Rock Album. At the 16th Brit Awards she won Brit Award for International Breakthrough Act. At the 38th Annual Grammy Awards in 1996, she won Best Female Rock Vocal Performance, Best Rock Song (both for "You Oughta Know"), Best Rock Album and Album of the Year.

"Ironic" got instant success, though the lyrics were heavily criticized for their malapropism, and the music video received 6 nominations at the 1996 MTV Video Music Awards, where it won Best New Artist in a Video, Best Female Video and Best Editing in a Video (won by Scott Gray, Editor), and was also nominated for Viewer's Choice, Best Direction in a Video and Video of the Year. Rather than perform that song at the ceremony, Morrissette performed "Your House" instead, which is homage to Joni Mitchell. The song was also nominated for two 1997 Grammy Awards—Record of the Year and Best Music Video, Short Form—and won Single of the Year at the 1997 Juno Awards, where she also won Songwriter of the Year and the International Achievement Award.

Morissette embarked on an 18-month world tour in support of Jagged Little Pill, beginning in small clubs and ending in large venues. Taylor Hawkins, who later joined the Foo Fighters, was the tour's drummer. Radiohead joined as the opening act in mid-1996. The video Jagged Little Pill, Live, which was co-directed by Morissette and is about the bulk of her tour won a 1998 Grammy Award for Best Music Video, Long Form.

Following the tour, Morissette began practicing Iyengar Yoga for balance. After the last December 1996 show, she went to India for six weeks, accompanied by Georgia, two aunts and two friends. The trip left her with an indelible impression and set the cornerstone for the concept of her next album.

"Thank U" (1998)
The most successful single from 1998's Supposed Former Infatuation Junkie was written after a trip to India.

"That I Would Be Good" (1998)
A live version of this ballad was released to promote 1999's Alanis Unplugged.

Morissette was featured as a guest vocalist on Ringo Starr's cover of "Drift Away" on his 1998 album, Vertical Man, and on the songs "Don't Drink the Water" and "Spoon" on the Dave Matthews Band album Before These Crowded Streets. She recorded the song "Uninvited" for the soundtrack to the 1998 film City of Angels. Although the track was never commercially released as a single, it received widespread radio airplay in the U.S. At the 1999 Grammy Awards, it won in the categories of Best Rock Song and Best Female Rock Vocal Performance, and was nominated for Best Song Written for a Motion Picture, Television or Other Visual Media. It was also nominated for a Golden Globe Award for Best Original Song.

In November 1998, Morissette released her fourth album, Supposed Former Infatuation Junkie, which she wrote and co-produced with Glen Ballard. The label hoped to sell 1 million copies of the album on initial release; instead, it debuted at number one on the Billboard 200 chart with first-week sales of 469,000 copies—a record, at the time, for the highest first-week sales of an album by a female artist. The wordy, personal lyrics on Supposed Former Infatuation Junkie alienated many fans, and after the album sold considerably less than Jagged Little Pill (1995), many labelled it an example of the sophomore jinx. It received positive reviews, including a four-star review from Rolling Stone. In Canada, it won the Juno Award for Best Album and was certified four times platinum. "Thank U", the album's only major international hit single, was released in October 1998 and was nominated for the 2000 Grammy Award for Best Female Pop Vocal Performance; the music video, which featured Morissette nude, generated mild controversy. She directed the videos for "Unsent" and "So Pure", which won, respectively, the MuchMusic Video Award for Best Director and the Juno Award for Video of the Year.

Morissette contributed vocals to four tracks on Jonathan Elias's project The Prayer Cycle, which was released in 1999, where she paid homage to her roots by singing in Hungarian on "Mercy" and "Faith", and in French on "Hope" and "Innocence". The same year, she released the live acoustic album Alanis Unplugged, which was recorded during her appearance on the television show MTV Unplugged. It featured tracks from her previous two albums alongside four new songs, including "King of Pain" (a cover of The Police song) and "No Pressure over Cappuccino", which she wrote with her main guitar player, Nick Lashley. The recording of the Supposed Former Infatuation Junkie track "That I Would Be Good", released as a single, became a minor hit on hot adult contemporary radio in America. Also in 1999, Morissette released a live version of her song "Are You Still Mad" on the charity album Live in the X Lounge II. For her live rendition of "So Pure" at Woodstock '99, she was nominated for Best Female Rock Vocal Performance at the 2001 Grammy Awards. During the summer of 1999, Morissette toured with singer-songwriter Tori Amos on the 5 and a Half Weeks Tour in support of Amos' album To Venus and Back (1999).

=== 2000–2007: Under Rug Swept and So-Called Chaos ===
In 2001, Morissette was featured with Stephanie McKay on the Tricky song "Excess", which is on his album Blowback. She released her fifth studio album, Under Rug Swept, in February 2002. For the first time in her career, she took on the role of sole writer and producer of an album. Her band, comprising Joel Shearer, Nick Lashley, Chris Chaney, and Gary Novak, played the majority of the instruments; additional contributions came from Eric Avery, Dean DeLeo, Flea, and Meshell Ndegeocello.

Under Rug Swept debuted at number one on the Billboard 200 chart, eventually going platinum in Canada and selling one million copies in the U.S. It produced the hit single "Hands Clean", which topped the Canadian Singles Chart and received substantial radio play; for her work on "Hands Clean" and "So Unsexy", Morissette won a Juno Award for Producer of the Year. A second single, "Precious Illusions", was released, but it did not garner significant success outside Canada or U.S. hot AC radio.

Later in 2002, Morissette released the combination package Feast on Scraps, which includes a DVD of live concert and backstage documentary footage directed by her and a CD containing eight previously unreleased songs from the Under Rug Swept recording sessions. Preceded by the single "Simple Together", it sold roughly 70,000 copies in the U.S. and was nominated for a Juno Award for Music DVD of the Year.

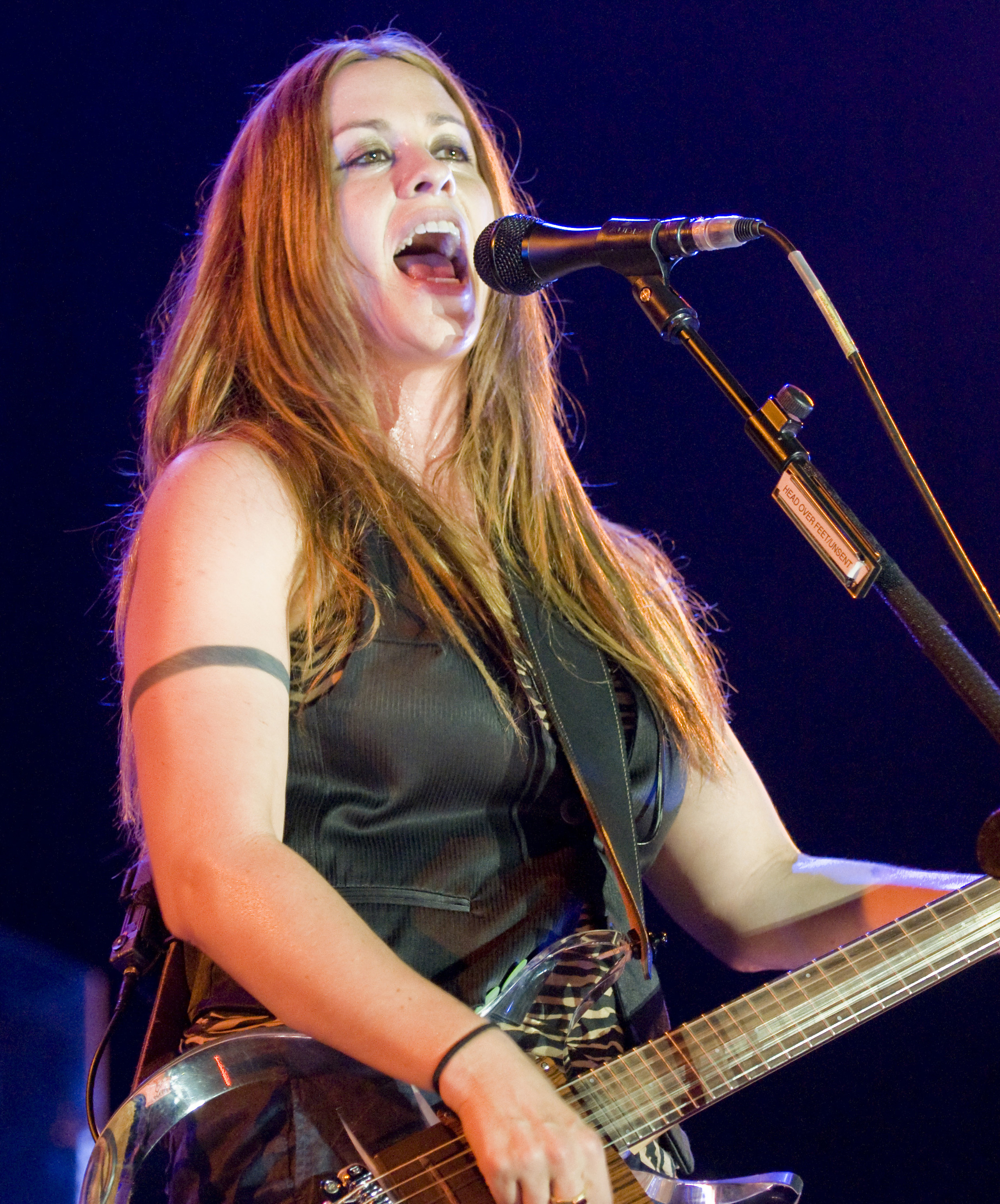
Morissette performing in 2008

Morissette hosted the Juno Awards of 2004 dressed in a bathrobe, which she took off to reveal a flesh-colored bodysuit, a response to the era of censorship in the U.S. caused by Janet Jackson's breast-flash incident during the Super Bowl XXXVIII halftime show. She released her sixth studio album, So-Called Chaos, in May 2004. She wrote the songs on her own again, and co-produced the album with Tim Thorney and pop music producer John Shanks. The album debuted at number five on the Billboard 200 chart to generally mixed critical reviews, and it became Morissette's lowest seller in the U.S. and was her first album not to top the chart. The lead single, "Everything", achieved major success on Adult Top 40 radio in America and was moderately popular elsewhere, particularly in Canada, although it failed to reach the top 40 on the U.S. Hot 100. Because the first line of the song includes the word "asshole", American radio stations refused to play it, and the single version was changed to include the word "nightmare" instead. Unhappy that U.S. radio networks had required her to change a word in the song, Canadian radio played the unaltered version, with her stating at the 2004 Juno Awards in Canada: "Well, I am overjoyed to be back in my homeland, the true North, strong and censor-free." Two other singles, "Out Is Through" and "Eight Easy Steps", fared considerably worse, although a dance mix of "Eight Easy Steps" was a U.S. club hit. Morissette embarked on a U.S. summer tour with long-time friends and fellow Canadians Barenaked Ladies, working with the non-profit environmental organization Reverb.

To commemorate the 10th anniversary of Jagged Little Pill (1995), Morissette released a studio acoustic version, Jagged Little Pill Acoustic, in June 2005. The album was released exclusively through Starbucks' Hear Music retail concept through their coffee shops for a six-week run. The limited availability led to a dispute between Maverick Records and HMV Canada, who retaliated by removing Morissette's other albums from sale for the duration of Starbucks's exclusive six-week sale. As of November 2010, Jagged Little Pill Acoustic had sold 372,000 copies in the U.S., and a video for "Hand in My Pocket" received rotation on VH1 in America. The accompanying tour ran for two months in mid-2005, with Morissette playing small theatre venues. During the same period, she was inducted into Canada's Walk of Fame. She opened for The Rolling Stones for a few dates of their A Bigger Bang Tour in fall 2005.

Morissette released the greatest hits album Alanis Morissette: The Collection in late 2005. The lead single and only new track, a cover of Seal's "Crazy", was an Adult Top 40 and dance hit in the U.S., but achieved only minimal chart success elsewhere. A limited edition of The Collection features a DVD including a documentary with videos of two unreleased songs from Morissette's 1996 Can't Not Tour: "King of Intimidation" and "Can't Not". (A reworked version of "Can't Not" had also appeared on Supposed Former Infatuation Junkie.) It also includes a ninety-second clip of the unreleased video for the single "Joining You". As of November 2010, The Collection had sold 373,000 copies in the U.S., according to Nielsen SoundScan. That same year, Morissette contributed the song "Wunderkind" to the soundtrack of the film The Chronicles of Narnia: The Lion, the Witch and the Wardrobe, and she was nominated for a Golden Globe Award for Best Original Song.

2006 marked the first year in Morissette's musical career without a single concert appearance showcasing her own songs, with the exception of an appearance on The Tonight Show with Jay Leno in January when she performed "Wunderkind".

On April 1, 2007, Morissette released a tongue-in-cheek cover of The Black Eyed Peas's selection "My Humps", which she recorded in a slow, mournful voice, accompanied only by a piano. The accompanying YouTube-hosted video, in which she dances provocatively with a group of men and hits the ones who act as if attempting to touch her breasts, had received 16,465,653 views as of February 15, 2009. She did not take any interviews for a time to explain the song, and it was theorized that she did it as an April Fools' Day joke. Black Eyed Peas vocalist Stacy "Fergie" Ferguson responded by sending Morissette a buttocks-shaped cake with an approving note. On the verge of the release of her following album, she finally elaborated on how the video came to be, citing that she became very much emotionally loaded while recording her new songs one after the other and one day she wished she could do a simple song like "My Humps" and the joke just took a life of its own.

Morissette performed at a gig for The Nightwatchman, a.k.a. Tom Morello of Rage Against the Machine and Audioslave, at the Hotel Café in Los Angeles in April 2007. The following June, she performed "The Star-Spangled Banner" and "O Canada", the American and Canadian national anthems, in Game 4 of the Stanley Cup Finals between the Ottawa Senators and Anaheim Ducks in Ottawa. (The NHL requires arenas to perform both the American and Canadian national anthems at games involving teams from both countries.)

=== 2008–2019: Flavors of Entanglement and Havoc and Bright Lights ===
In early 2008, Morissette participated in a tour with Matchbox Twenty and Mutemath as a special guest. Her seventh studio album, Flavors of Entanglement, which was produced by Guy Sigsworth, was released in mid-2008. She has said that the album was created out of her grief after her breakup with Ryan Reynolds, saying "it was cathartic." She stated that in late 2008, she would embark on a North American headlining tour, but in the meantime she would be promoting the album internationally by performing at shows and festivals and making television and radio appearances. The album's first single was "Underneath", a video for which was submitted to the 2007 Elevate Film Festival, the purpose of which festival was to create documentaries, music videos, narratives and shorts regarding subjects to raise the level of human consciousness on the earth. On October 3, 2008, she released the video for her latest single, "Not as We". She said the album was created out of her grief after splitting up with Reynolds, and the song "Torch" was written about him. She has also recorded a cover of the 1984 Willie Nelson and Julio Iglesias hit, "To All the Girls I've Loved Before", re-written as "To All the Boys I've Loved Before". Nelson played rhythm guitar on the recording. In April 2010, she released the song "I Remain", which she wrote for the Prince of Persia: The Sands of Time soundtrack. On May 26, 2010, the season finale of American Idol, she performed a duet of "You Oughta Know" with Runner Up Crystal Bowersox. She left Maverick Records after all promotion for Flavors was completed.

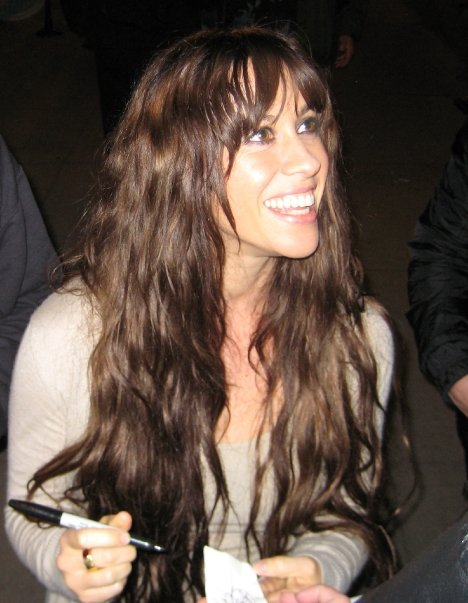
Morissette signing autographs for fans, 2011

On November 20, 2011, she appeared at the American Music Awards. When asked about the new album during a short interview, she said she had recorded 31 songs, and that the album would "likely be out next year, probably [in] summertime". On December 21, 2011, she performed a duet of "Uninvited" with finalist Josh Krajcik during the performance finale of the X-Factor.

Morissette embarked on a European tour for summer 2012, according to Alanis.com. In early May 2012, a new song called "Magical Child" appeared on a Starbucks compilation called Every Mother Counts.

On May 2, 2012, Morissette revealed through her Facebook account that her eighth studio album, entitled Havoc and Bright Lights, would be released in August 2012, on new label Collective Sounds, distributed by Sony's RED Distribution. On the same day, Billboard specified the date as August 28 and revealed the album would contain twelve tracks. Its lead single, "Guardian", was released on iTunes on May 15, 2012, and hit the radio airwaves four days prior to this. The single had minor success in North America, charting the Billboard Bubbling Under Hot 100 Singles in the US and almost reaching the top 40 in Canada. It was a hit in several European countries.

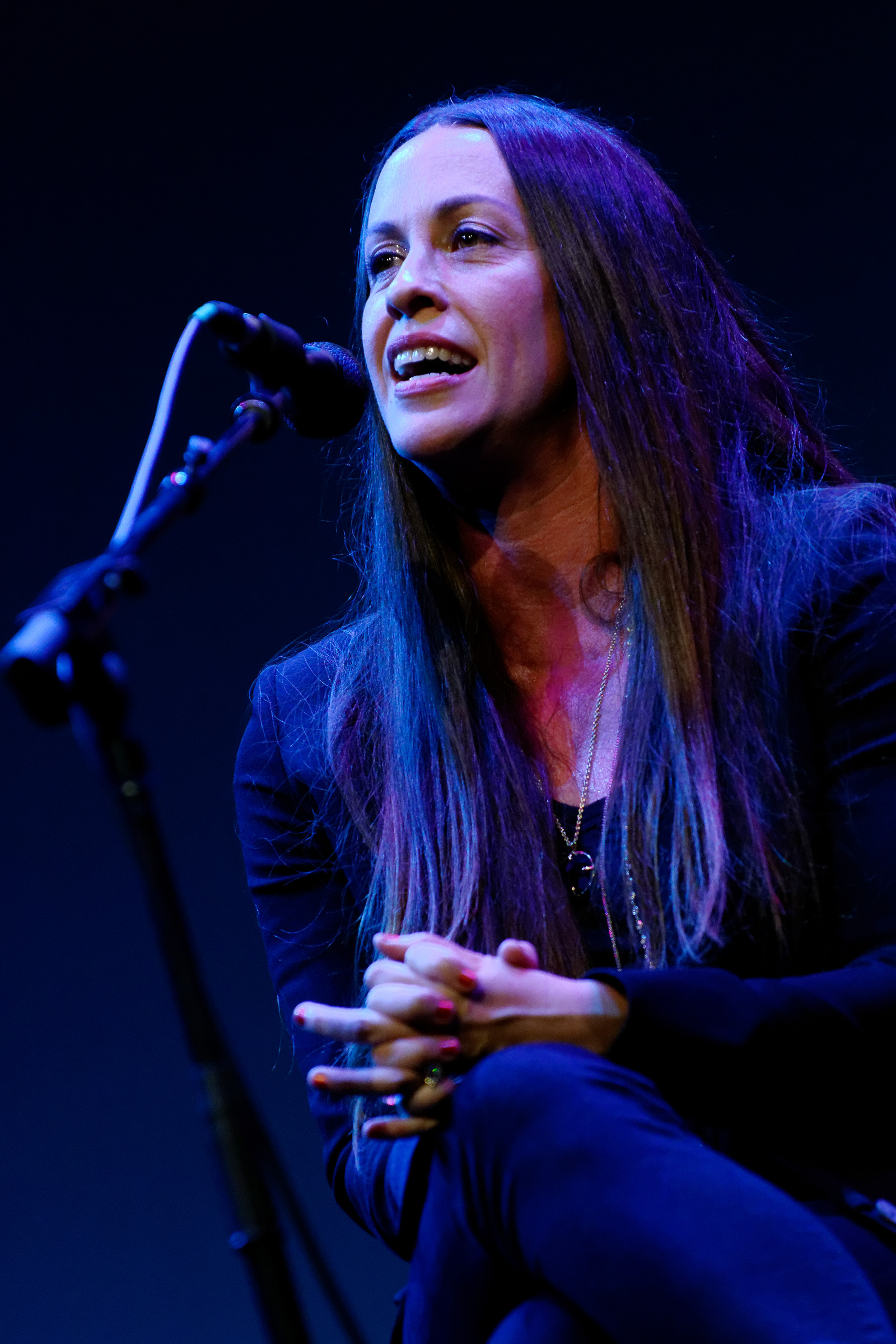
Morissette performing at Espacio Movistar 8 in Barcelona, 2013

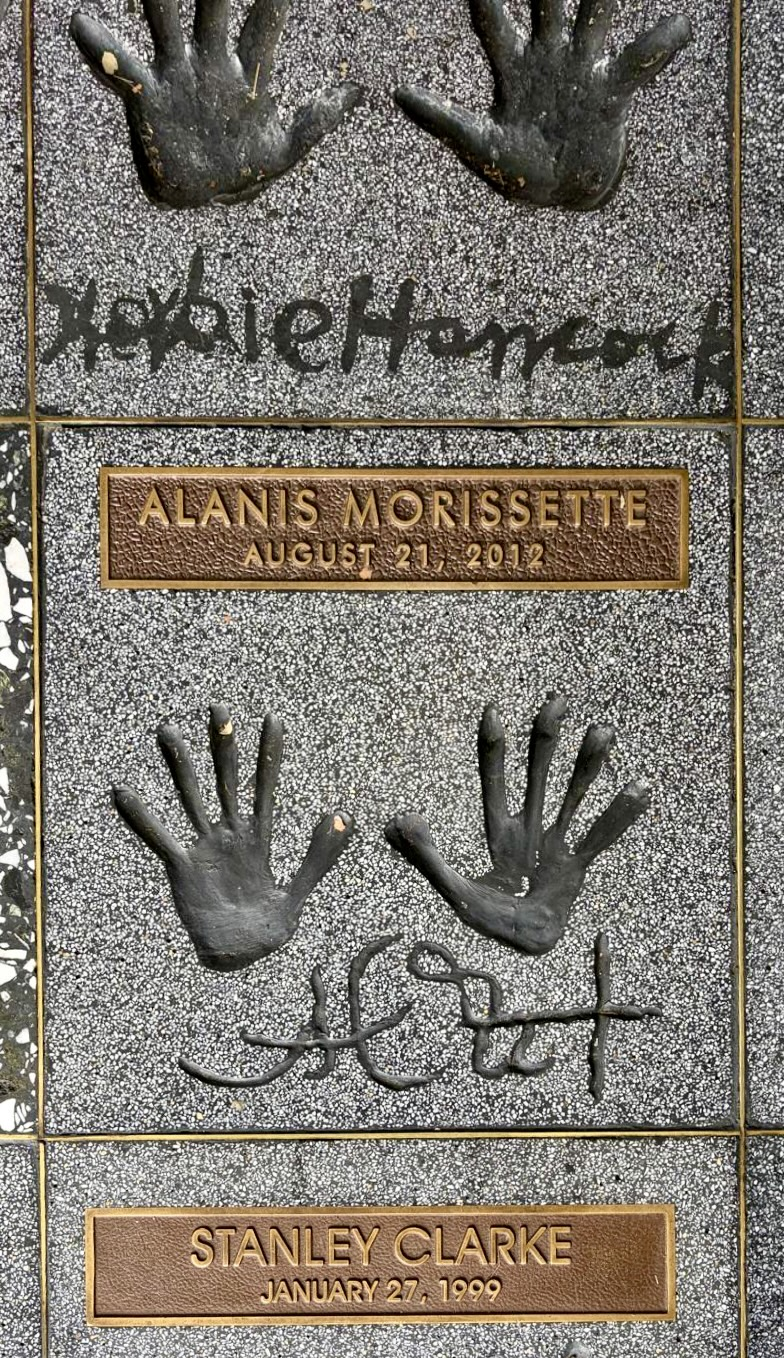
Guitar Center RockWalk in Hollywood

On August 21, 2012, Morissette was inducted into the Guitar Center RockWalk in Hollywood. She received the UCLA Spring Sing's George and Ira Gershwin Award on May 16, 2014, at Pauley Pavilion. On her website starting in summer 2014, in celebration of her fortieth birthday, the LP record for her song "Big Sur" was offered for sale, which was previously available on the Target edition of her 2012 album, Havoc and Bright Lights. July 25, 2014, was the start of the ten-show Intimate and Acoustic tour. In 2015, she was named to the Canadian Music Hall of Fame.

In celebration of the twentieth anniversary of the release of Jagged Little Pill, a new four-disc collector's edition was released on October 30, 2015. The four-disc edition includes remastered audio of the original album as well as an entire disc of 10 unreleased demos from the era, handpicked by Morissette from her archives, offering a deeper and more personal look at the classic album. Also included is a previously unreleased concert from 1995 as well as 2005's Jagged Little Pill Acoustic.

While on tour in August 2017, Morissette teased a song which would become known as "I Miss The Band". On October 27, 2017, she premiered a new song entitled "Rest", which was released officially in May 2021, and performed "Castle of Glass" with members of the band No Doubt and Mike Shinoda at the Linkin Park and Friends – Celebrate Life in Honor of Chester Bennington memorial concert. In November 2017, she tweeted that she was writing 22 songs with Michael Farrell.

On March 16, 2018, Morissette performed a new song called "Ablaze" during her 2018 tour. In October 2018, she revealed on social media that she had written 23 new songs, and hinted at a new album with hashtag "#alanismorissettenewrecord2019", after a six-year hiatus. Song titles from the writing session include "Reckoning", "Diagnosis", "Her" and "Legacy". On May 5, 2018, Jagged Little Pill, a jukebox musical featuring Morissette's songs, premiered in Cambridge, Massachusetts, at the American Repertory Theater. Morissette contributed two new songs to the musical, "Smiling" and "Predator". It transferred to Broadway in fall 2019, starting previews on November 3 and opening on December 5 at the Broadhurst Theatre. It received fifteen Tony Award nominations, the most of any production that season. It also won a Grammy Award for Best Musical Theater Album at the 63rd Annual Grammy Awards, including Morissette being the principal lyricist and co-composer.

=== 2020–present: Such Pretty Forks in the Road, The Storm Before the Calm, and Good Weather for Immaculate Conception ===
In June 2019, Morissette went into the studio in Los Angeles. According to an interview, she had written all the songs, and "Smiling" would be included on the new album, likely to be released early 2020. On August 8, 2019, she revealed that the new album was produced by Alex Hope and Catherine Marks. On December 1, 2019, she announced her first studio album in eight years, Such Pretty Forks in the Road, set for release on May 1, 2020. The first single off the record, "Reasons I Drink", was released on December 2, 2019. Morissette was featured on Halsey's song "Alanis' Interlude", released on January 17, 2020. On February 5, 2020, she revealed that her upcoming album was mixed by Chris Dugan. The second single from the album, "Smiling", was released on February 20, 2020. On April 15, 2020, Morissette announced that the album's release would be postponed due to concerns over the COVID-19 pandemic. It was released on July 31, 2020.

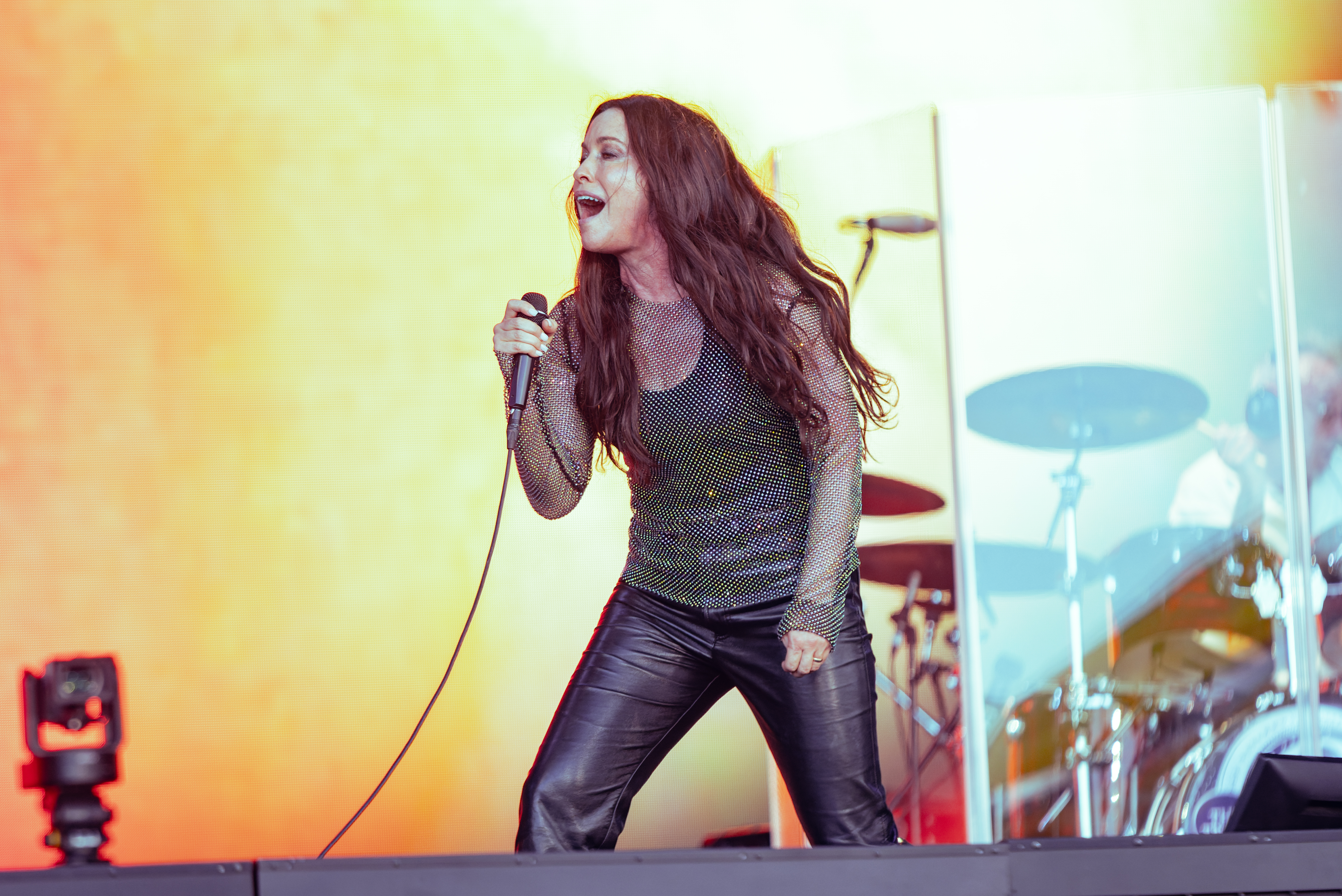
Morissette performing at Glastonbury Festival in 2025

She was originally scheduled to embark on a world tour for the 25th anniversary of Jagged Little Pill in June 2020 with Garbage and Liz Phair, both of whom already opened for Morissette in 1999 during Junkie Tour. The latter cancelled her shows in North America and was replaced by Cat Power. Due to the COVID-19 pandemic, the tour was postponed to summer 2021. It then sprawled for the next two years, including some dates in the Philippines for the first time after 27 years. Beth Orton joined the UK and Europe leg of the summer tour 2022. Aimee Mann and Feist were confirmed as special guests in summer 2023 in the North American dates. On May 18, 2022, Morissette premiered the new track "Safety—Empath in Paradise". The new album of meditation music titled The Storm Before the Calm was released on June 17, 2022. The record was co-written with and produced by Dave Harrington, known for his work in the electronic music duo Darkside. On April 14, 2023, Morissette released a new song "No Return", which is a cover version of the theme song for Yellowjackets TV series.

In an interview to Variety magazine, Morissette revealed that she would start working on recording a new album in 2024. In November 2023, she also announced The Triple Moon Tour with 33 live dates in the United States for the summer 2024 with the Joan Jett and the Blackhearts as support act, commemorating the 25th anniversary of the Supposed Former Infatuation Junkie album. On January 30, 2024, she was awarded with the Luminary of the Year prize for the outstanding contribution to the music, at the 1st annual Resonator Awards, organized by We Are Moving the Needle, a non-profit organization that aims to empower women producers and engineers.

On August 8, 2025, Morissette released a new single called "Coming Around Again", which is a duet with Carly Simon, who originally performed the song.

In October 2025, Morissette started a performance residency at Caesars Palace, Las Vegas.

In June 2026, Morissette performed at Canada's 2026 FIFA World Cup Opening Ceremony in their first World Cup game against Bosnia and Herzegovina, singing "O Canada" at the Toronto Stadium. Five months later, she released a holiday album titled Good Weather for Immaculate Conception.

== Legacy ==
Morissette and her music has inspired numerous artists including Brandi Carlile, Florence Welch, Adele, Melanie C, Natalie Imbruglia, Nelly Furtado, KT Tunstall, Katy Perry, Taylor Swift, Olivia Rodrigo, Raven-Symoné, Teddy Sinclair, Lea Michele, Kelly Clarkson, Avril Lavigne and Bebe Rexha.

== Other ventures ==
=== Acting ===
In 1986, Morissette had her first stint as an actress in five episodes of the children's television sketch comedy series You Can't Do That on Television. She appeared on stage with the Orpheus Musical Theatre Society in 1985 and 1988. In 1999, she delved into acting again, for the first time since 1993, appearing as God in the Kevin Smith comedy Dogma and contributing the song "Still" to its soundtrack. She reprised her role as God for a post-credits scene in Smith's next film, Jay and Silent Bob Strike Back, to literally close the book on the View Askewniverse. She also appeared in the HBO comedies Sex and the City and Curb Your Enthusiasm, appeared in the play The Vagina Monologues, and had brief cameos playing herself in the Brazilian hit soap operas Celebridade and Malhação.

In late 2003, Morissette appeared in the Off-Broadway play The Exonerated as Sunny Jacobs, a death row inmate freed after proof surfaced that she was innocent. In April 2006, MTV News reported that she would reprise her role in The Exonerated in London from May 23 until May 28. She expanded her acting credentials with the July 2004 release of the Cole Porter biographical film De-Lovely, in which she performed the song "Let's Do It (Let's Fall in Love)" and had a brief role as an anonymous stage performer. In February 2005, she made a guest appearance on the Canadian television show Degrassi: The Next Generation with Dogma co-star Jason Mewes and director Kevin Smith. Also in 2005, she, then engaged to Ryan Reynolds, made a cameo appearance as "herself" as a former client of Reynolds' character in the film Just Friends. This scene was deleted from the theatrical release, and is only available on the DVD.

In 2006, Morrissette guest-starred in an episode of Lifetime's Lovespring International as a homeless woman named Lucinda, three episodes of FX's Nip/Tuck, playing a lesbian named Poppy, and the mockumentary-documentary Pittsburgh as herself. Morissette appeared in eight episodes of Weeds, playing Dr. Audra Kitson, a "no-nonsense obstetrician" who treats pregnant main character Nancy Botwin. Her first episode aired in July 2009. In early 2010, she returned to the stage, performing a one-night engagement in An Oak Tree, an experimental play in Los Angeles. The performance was a sell-out. In April 2010, Morissette was confirmed to be in the cast of season six of Weeds again portraying Dr. Audra Kitson.

Morissette also starred in a film adaptation of Philip K. Dick's novel Radio Free Albemuth. She plays Sylvia, an ordinary woman in unexpected remission from lymphoma. She stated that she is "...a big fan of Philip K. Dick's poetic and expansively imaginative books" and that she "feel[s] blessed to portray Sylvia, and to be part of this story being told in film". She appeared as Amanda, a former bandmate of main character Ava Alexander (played by Maya Rudolph), in one episode of NBC's Up All Night on February 16, 2012. Rudolph officiated as minister for her wedding with both performing the explicit version of their hit hip hop song "Back It Up (Beep Beep)". In 2014, she played the role of Marisa Damia, the lover of architect and designer Eileen Gray, in the film The Price of Desire, directed by Mary McGuckian. In 2021, she was featured as a recurring character on adult-animation show The Great North.

=== Advocacy and philanthropy ===
Morissette is an advocate and educator in the areas of spiritual, psychological, and physical wholeness, with a focus on addiction recovery, trauma healing, women's empowerment, and holistic education for children. Her work spans a range of activities, including performances, written works, interviews, and public speaking engagements, as well as leading workshops and teachings. Throughout her career, she has collaborated with influential figures such as Oprah Winfrey, Arianna Huffington, Neale Donald Walsch, Richard Schwartz, Gabor Maté, Peter Levine, Dan Siegel, and Marianne Williamson. She has also facilitated workshops at notable institutions such as UCLA, the Omega Institute, Esalen, and 1440 Multiversity, both in-person and online.

In 2008 Morissette contributed a recording of "Versions of Violence" for the album Songs for Tibet: The Art of Peace to promote peace. She contributed to 1 Giant Leap, performing "Arrival" with Zap Mama and she has released an acoustic version of her song "Still" as part of a compilation from Music for Relief in support of the 2010 Haiti earthquake crisis.

=== Jagged Little Pill adaptations ===
In May 2018, the American Repertory Theater (Cambridge, Massachusetts) premiered Jagged Little Pill, a musical with music by Morissette and Glen Ballard, lyrics by Morissette, book by Diablo Cody, and directed by Diane Paulus. When it was staged on Broadway, it won two Tony awards. Jagged, a documentary film about Morissette and Jagged Little Pill by filmmaker Alison Klayman, premiered at the 2021 Toronto International Film Festival before airing on HBO as part of the Music Box series of documentary films about music history.

=== Journalism and podcasts ===
In October 2015, Conversation with Alanis Morissette features conversations with different individuals from different schools and walks of life discussing everything from psychology to art to spirituality to design to health and well-being, to relationships (whether they be romantic or colleagueship or parent with children relationships). The monthly podcast is currently available to download on iTunes and free to listen to on YouTube. In January 2016, she began a short-lived advice column in The Guardian newspaper.

== Personal life ==
Morissette was raised in a devout Catholic family in Canada. She became a US citizen in 2005, while retaining her Canadian citizenship. She has been a practising Buddhist for many years.

Throughout her teen years and 20s, Morissette had depression and various eating disorders. She recovered from them and started to eat a healthier diet. In 2009, she ran a marathon promoting awareness for the National Eating Disorders Association. In a 2024 interview, she told the New York Times that she works out with 15-to-20 pound kettle weights while on tour.

In the 2021 documentary Jagged, Morissette said men committed statutory rape offences against her when she was 15 years old.

Over seven years, Morissette's business manager, Jonathan Schwartz, stole over $5 million from her. He confessed to doing so in April 2017 and was sentenced to six years in prison.

On October 22, 2019, Morissette shared her nearly decade-long experience with postpartum depression on CBS This Morning.

In 1996, Morissette bought a home in Brentwood, Los Angeles. She also had an apartment in Ottawa and a home in Malibu, the latter of which was damaged in the Woolsey Fire.

=== Relationships ===
Morissette dated actor and comedian Dave Coulier for a short time in the early 1990s.

Morissette met actor Ryan Reynolds at Drew Barrymore's birthday party in 2002, and they began dating soon afterwards. They announced their engagement in June 2004. In February 2007, representatives for them announced they had decided to end their engagement.

On May 22, 2010, Morissette married rapper Mario "Souleye" Treadway in a private ceremony at their Los Angeles home. They have three children.

In November 2026, Morrisette came out as pansexual on the Handsome podcast.

== Discography ==
- Alanis (1991)
- Now Is the Time (1992)
- Jagged Little Pill (1995)
- Supposed Former Infatuation Junkie (1998)
- Under Rug Swept (2002)
- So-Called Chaos (2004)
- Flavors of Entanglement (2008)
- Havoc and Bright Lights (2012)
- Such Pretty Forks in the Road (2020)
- The Storm Before the Calm (2022)
- Good Weather for Immaculate Conception (2026)

== Filmography ==
=== Film ===
| Year | Title | Role | Notes |
|---|---|---|---|
| 1993 | Anything for Love | Alanis | Uncredited |
| 1999 | Dogma | God | |
| 2001 | Jay and Silent Bob Strike Back | God | Post-credit scene |
| 2004 | De-Lovely | Unnamed singer | |
| 2005 | Fuck | Herself | Documentary |
| 2005 | Just Friends | Herself | Uncredited (DVD Only) |
| 2006 | The Great Warming | Herself | Narrator for film |
| 2010 | Radio Free Albemuth | Sylvia | |
| 2014 | Lennon or McCartney | Herself | Short documentary film |
| 2015 | Sensitive The Untold Story | Herself | Documentary |
| 2015 | Being Canadian | Herself | Documentary |
| 2016 | The Price of Desire | Marisa Damia | |
| 2021 | Jagged | Herself | Documentary |

=== Television ===
| Year | Title | Role | Notes |
|---|---|---|---|
| 1986 | You Can't Do That on Television | Herself | |
| 1996 | Malhação | Herself | Brazilian soap opera |
| 2000 | Sex and the City | Dawn | Episode "Boy, Girl, Boy, Girl" |
| 2002 | Curb Your Enthusiasm | Herself | Episode: "The Terrorist Attack" |
| 2003 | Celebridade | Herself | Brazilian telenovela |
| 2004 | Mad TV | Herself | Episode: #10.4 |
| 2004 | American Dreams | Singer in the Lair | Episode: "What Dreams May Come" |
| 2005 | Degrassi: The Next Generation | Herself | Episode: " Goin' Down the Road: Part 1" |
| 2006 | Lovespring International | Lucinda | |
| 2006 | Nip/Tuck | Poppy | 3 episodes |
| 2009 | Live from the Artists Den | Herself | 1 episode |
| 2009 | Sit Down, Shut Up | Herself | Episode: "Helen and Sue's High School Reunion" |
| 2009–2010 | Weeds | Dr. Audra Kitson | 8 episodes |
| 2012 | Up All Night | Amanda | Episode: "Travel Day" |
| 2012 | The Voice | Herself | Advisor for Team Adam Levine (season 2) |
| 2018 | Top Wing | Sandy Stork | 2 episodes |
| 2021 | Madagascar: A Little Wild | Starlene (voice) | Guest role, Episode: "Hermit Fab" |
| 2021 | Alter Ego | Herself | Judge |
| 2021–2025 | The Great North | Herself | Recurring role |
| 2023 | American Idol | Herself | Guest Judge, Mentor, Guest Performer |
| 2026 | The Chit Show | Herself | Web series, cameo |

== Stage ==
| Year | Title | Role |
|---|---|---|
| 1999 | The Vagina Monologues | |
| 2004 | The Exonerated | Sunny Jacobs |
| 2010 | An Oak Tree | |
| 2018 | Jagged Little Pill | Co-composer, lyricist |

== Tours ==
Headlining

- Jagged Little Tour (1995)
- Intellectual Intercourse Tour (1995–1996)
- Can't Not Tour (1996) featuring Radiohead
- Dhanyavad Tour (1998)
- Junkie Tour (1999) featuring Garbage and Liz Phair
- One Tour (2000)
- Under Rug Swept Tour (2001)
- Toward Our Union Mended Tour (2002)
- All I Really Want Tour (2003)
- So-Called Chaos Tour (2004)
- The Diamond Wink Tour (2005) featuring Jason Mraz
- Jagged Little Pill Acoustic Tour (2005)
- Flavors of Entanglement Tour (2008–2009)
- Guardian Angel Tour (2012)
- Intimate and Acoustic (2014)
- World Tour (2018)
- World Tour: Celebrating 25 Years of Jagged Little Pill (2021–2023) featuring Garbage, Cat Power, Beth Orton, Aimee Mann and Feist
- The Triple Moon Tour (2024–2025) featuring Joan Jett and the Blackhearts, Morgan Wade, P!nk, Liz Phair and Brandi Carlile
- World Tour (2026) featuring Skunk Anansie, Wet Leg and St. Vincent

Co-headlining

- Summer Tour (1996) (with Foo Fighters, Manic Street Preachers, Dodgy)
- 5 ½ Weeks Tour (1999) (with Tori Amos)
- Au Naturale Tour (2004) (with the Barenaked Ladies)
- Exile in America Tour (2008) (with Matchbox Twenty and Mutemath)

Residencies

- Alanis Morissette: Las Vegas (2025)

Opening act

- To the Extreme Tour (1991) (opening act for Vanilla Ice)
- 1996 European Summer Tour (1996) (opening act for Neil Young and Crazy Horse)
- 1999 Summer Tour (1999) (opening act for Dave Matthews Band–Denver)
- A Bigger Bang Tour (2005) (opening act for The Rolling Stones)

== Awards and nominations ==
Morissette was nominated for Best New Artist at the 38th Grammy Awards, and she won Best New Artist at the 1996 MTV Video Music Awards for her song "Ironic"; additionally, she was nominated for a Tony Award for the stage adaptation of Jagged Little Pill. She has been nominated four times for Songwriter of the Year at the Juno Awards, winning two in 1996 and 1997. In October 2002, Rolling Stone magazine ranked Jagged Little Pill number 31 on its Women in Rock – The 50 Essential Albums list, and in 2003, the album was ranked number 327 on the magazine's "The 500 Greatest Albums of All Time". Jagged Little Pill was also featured in the book 1001 Albums You Must Hear Before You Die. She was inducted into Canada's Walk of Fame in 2005. She was honored with the 2023 Carnegie Corporation of New York "Great Immigrants" Awards along with Angélique Kidjo, Ke Huy Quan, and Pedro Pascal.

== See also ==
- Canadian rock
- Music of Canada
- List of Canadian Grammy Award winners and nominees
- List of diamond-certified albums in Canada
- List of best-selling albums
