= Wade Morissette =

Canadian musician

- Born: Wade Imre Morissette; June 1, 1974 (age 52); Ottawa, Ontario, Canada
- Relatives: Alanis Morissette (twin sister); Souleye (brother-in-law)
- Musical career
- Genres: Kirtan; indie rock; pop-rock
- Occupations: Musician; yoga and reiki instructor; therapist; author
- Instruments: Piano; guitar; harmonium; djembe; tabla; vocals
- Years active: 2004–present
- Label: Nutone (Nettwerk)

Wade Imre Morissette (born June 1, 1974) is a Canadian kirtan and indie pop-rock musician.

== Early life ==
Wade Morissette was born on June 1, 1974 at Riverside Hospital of Ottawa in Ottawa, Ontario, the son of Georgia Mary Ann Feuerstein, a Hungarian-born teacher, and Alan Richard Morissette, a high school principal of French and Irish descent. Wade is the twin brother of Alanis Morissette, whom he names as "one of the biggest influences in my life"; they have an older brother, Chad.

== Music ==
Wade took to music at an early age, studying piano as a child and guitar and djembe in his teens. During a trip to India, he encountered devotional yoga and chanting, and decided to combine his interests in yoga and music, to create his own blend of indie rock/pop music with Sanskrit and English chants.

In 2004, Wade was asked to be an ambassador for Lululemon, the popular yoga-inspired athletic apparel company. At the same time, he had self-released his debut album, Sargam Scales of Music. This turned into a world tour to promote both his album and the clothing line with the company signing on as a sponsor. The Lululemon Yoga Pilgrimage kicked off in 2005 and took Wade to Tokyo, Hong Kong and 32 cities in North America and continued on through early 2006 with stops in Thailand, Australia, New Zealand and Mexico.

In late 2006, Nettwerk Music Group CEO and yoga enthusiast Terry McBride signed Wade to the label's Nutone Music division. Wade has since released his second and third albums, Strong as Diamonds: Om Vajra Kaya Namaha, in 2007 and Maha Moha – The Great Delusion in 2008.

During live performances, Wade often begins with bliss dance and ends with a kirtan. Wade, on guitar and harmonium, sings out a phrase; the audience responds until the musicians and audience mesh.

== Yoga, Reiki and other ==
Wade has been practising and teaching yoga since 1995. He has completed Iyengar, Classical Ashtanga and Ashtanga (vinyasa) yoga teacher training. He has studied Vinyasa, Viniyoga, Anusara and Kriya yoga, as well as zazen, Vedic chanting, and active movement and sound meditations with some of the best-known teachers in Canada, North America, and India. He is also a Reiki master, certified Phoenix Rising yoga therapist, and Viniyoga Therapist. He leads teacher trainings, workshops, retreats, and music-dance evenings internationally.

== Writing and speaking ==
Wade has had features published in the Yoga Journal and Maclean's Magazine. His work includes the book Transformative Yoga: Five Keys to Unlocking Inner Bliss (2009), which he co-authored with his twin Alanis Morissette. He is also planning a series of motivational seminars.

== Discography ==
- Sargam Scales of Music (2004)
- Strong as Diamonds: Om Vajra Kaya Namaha (2007)
- Maha Moha – The Great Delusion (2008)
- "Savasana Land"

== Videography ==
- Together and Calling (2007)
