= Futurecop! =

British electronic music duo

- Origin: United Kingdom
- Genres: Synthwave; synthpop; ambient; new wave
- Instruments: Computers, vintage synthesizers and drum machines
- Years active: 2007–present
- Labels: The Sleepover Party, Southern Fried, Kiez Beats, New Retro Wave, TimeSlave Recordings

Futurecop! are Manzur Iqbal and Peter Carrol, British cinematic and electronic composers.

== Life and career ==
=== Musical career ===
Manzur and Peter met at university, where they were enrolled in the same course. Even though Manzur was an outcast and Peter was part of the popular crowd, their love of 1980s/90s memorabilia brought them together, and they became best friends very quickly.

After graduating from university, Manzur spent all of his time re-creating the sound of his childhood. With no previous knowledge of electronic production, he used a laptop, a MIDI keyboard and Reason. Iqbal and Carrol joined to form Futurecop!. They have said Futurecop! is the discovery of life and beyond.

Futurecop! released their second full-length album, Hopes, Dreams & Alienation, in December 2013. An album influenced by angst and their favourite electro influences such as Justice. Remixes came from Lifelike, Pony Pony Run Run, Anamanaguchi, Strange Talk and Teen Daze. It received favourable reviews from blogs such as Noisey, MTV Iggy, Data Transmission and Indie Shuffle.

On 23 November 2018, Futurecop! released a new single "Edge Of The Universe" with Canadian synth-pop band Parallels on American label New Retrowave.

== Discography ==
=== Albums ===
| Year | Title | Notes |
|---|---|---|
| 2006 | Futurecop! | Independent release |
| 2010 | It's Forever, Kids | |
| 2010 | The Remixes <3 | Remix album |
| 2012 | The Movie | |
| 2013 | Hopes, Dreams & Alienation | |
| 2014 | Fairy Tales | |
| 2015 | Fairy Tales: Remixed | Remix album |
| 2016 | The Lost Tapes | |
| 2017 | Return To Alvograth | |
| 2019 | Voltrana | |
| 2022 | From Oceans Within | |
| 2023 | Between The Moon And Stars | |

=== EP ===
| Year | Title | Notes |
|---|---|---|
| 2008 | The Unicorn & the Lost City of Alvograth | |
| 2011 | The Adventures of Starpony - EP | |

=== Singles ===
| Year | Title | Notes |
|---|---|---|
| 2011 | Dreams (featuring Keenhouse) | |
| 2011 | N.A.S.A. (feat. Codebreaker) | |
| 2012 | Starworshipper | |
| 2013 | Atlantis 1997 | |
| 2013 | Misanthropist Wolf | |
| 2013 | Superheroes (feat. KRISTINE) | |
| 2013 | Coming Home (feat. Neverstore) / Maladaptive Daydreaming | |
| 2014 | Sun Is Mine (feat. Mereki) | |
| 2014 | Into Your Heart (feat. Hunz & Mosaik) | |
| 2019 | We Belong (feat. Parallels) | |
| 2019 | This Moment Forever (feat. Parallels) | |
| 2019 | Breakfast Cereal | |
| 2019 | Against the Tide (featuring NINA) | |
| 2019 | Let Go (Acoustic Version) (feat. Siamese Youth) | |
| 2022 | Hold Me Forever (feat. Friday Night Firefight) | |
| 2022 | My Love (feat. Dreamers Avenue) | |
| 2022 | Sword of Veo | |
| 2022 | Secrets of Hiroshi | |
| 2022 | Lovers | |
| 2025 | So...Far Away (with TimeMachine1985) | |
