= List of awards and nominations received by Alanis Morissette =

Alanis Morissette awards and nominations
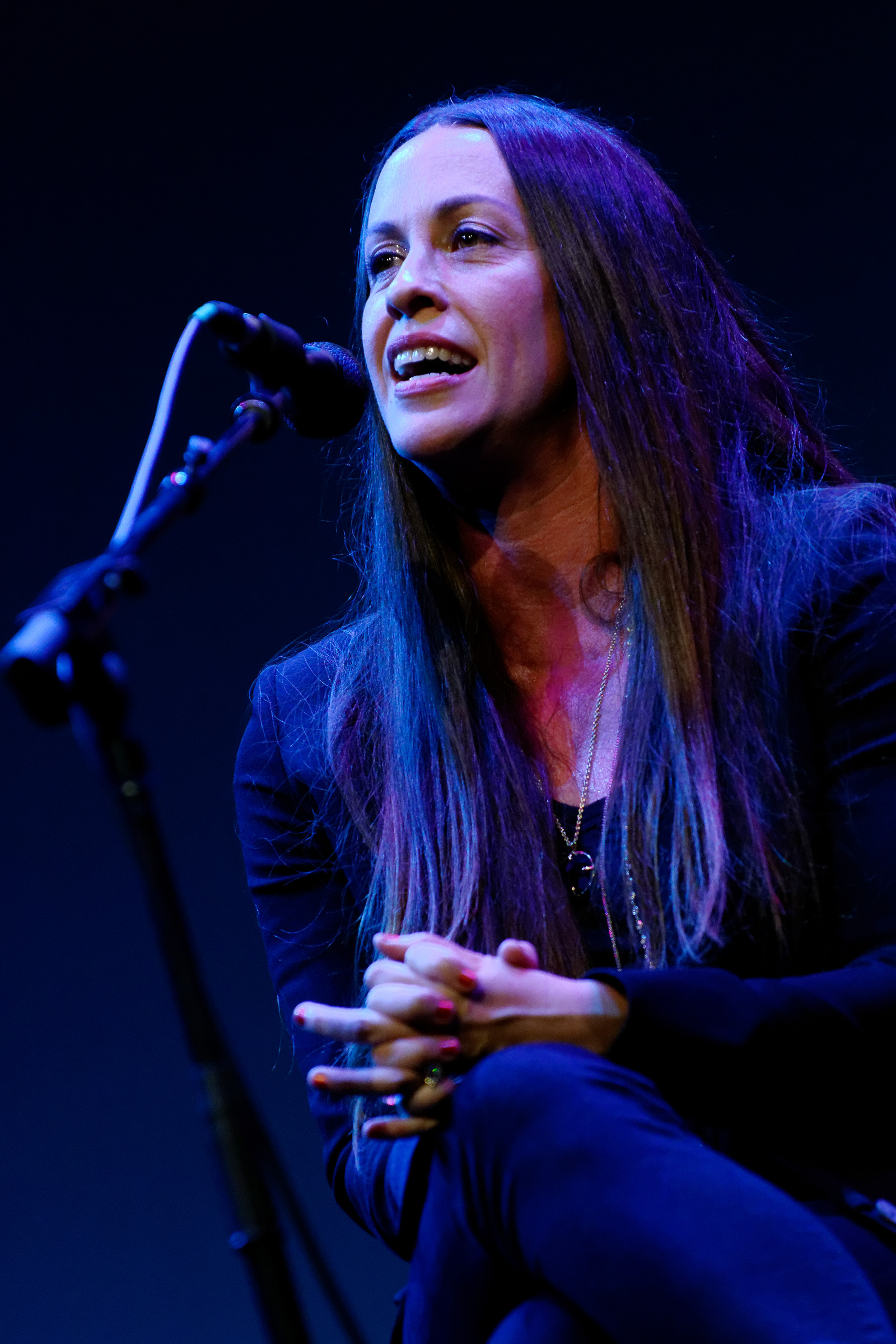
- Morissette performing at Saban Theater in Beverly Hills, California, October 20, 2013
Awards and nominations
Award	Wins	Nominations
American Music Awards	2	4
Brit Awards	1	3
Grammy Awards	7	14
Golden Globe Awards	0	2
Juno Awards	14	24
MTV Europe Music Awards	1	3
MTV Video Music Awards	3	7
People's Choice Awards	0	2
Tony Awards	0	1

Totals (Note: Certain award groups do not simply award one winner. They acknowledge several different recipients, have runners-up, and have third place. Since this is a specific recognition and is different from losing an award, runner-up mentions are considered wins in this award tally. For simplification and to avoid errors, each award in this list has been presumed to have had a prior nomination.)
- Wins: 39
- Nominations: 81

Alanis Morissette is a Canadian and American rock singer-songwriter and musician from Ottawa, Ontario. Morissette has released five studio albums internationally through Maverick Records: Jagged Little Pill (1995), Supposed Former Infatuation Junkie (1998), Under Rug Swept (2002), So-Called Chaos (2004), and Flavors of Entanglement (2008). Jagged Little Pill, Supposed Former Infatuation Junkie, and Under Rug Swept debuted at number one on the Billboard 200, and were among the top five on the Canadian Top 50 Album Chart. After leaving Maverick, Morissette released Havoc and Bright Lights (2012) independently via Collective Sounds and Such Pretty Forks in the Road (2020) through Epiphany Music and Thirty Tigers in North America, and by RCA and Sony Music in the United Kingdom and Europe.

Morissette has won and been nominated for numerous awards; she has won seven Grammy Awards and fourteen Juno Awards. She was nominated for Best New Artist at the 38th Grammy Awards, and won Best New Artist at the 1996 MTV Video Music Awards for her song, "Ironic"; additionally she was nominated for a Tony Award for the stage adaptation of Jagged Little Pill. Morissette has been nominated four times for Songwriter of the Year at the Juno Awards, winning two in 1996 and 1997. Her international debut album, Jagged Little Pill, became the second-best-selling album of the 1990s, with over fifteen million copies sold by 2000 in the United States. In October 2002, Rolling Stone magazine ranked Jagged Little Pill number 31 on its Women in Rock – The 50 Essential Albums list, and in 2003, the album was ranked number 327 on the magazine's "The 500 Greatest Albums of All Time". Jagged Little Pill was also featured in the book 1001 Albums You Must Hear Before You Die. Overall, Morissette has received 26 awards from 56 nominations. She was inducted into Canada's Walk of Fame in 2005.

== ASCAP Pop Music Awards ==
Year	Nominee / work	Award	Result
1999	"Uninvited"	Most Performed Song	Won

== American Music Awards ==
Year	Nominee / work	Award	Result
1996	Alanis Morissette	Favorite Pop/Rock Female Artist	Nominated
1996	Alanis Morissette	Favorite Pop/Rock New Artist	Nominated
1997	Alanis Morissette	Favorite Pop/Rock Female Artist	Won
1997	Jagged Little Pill	Favorite Pop/Rock Album	Won

== Brit Awards ==
Year	Nominee / work	Award	Result
1996	Alanis Morissette	International Breakthrough Act	Won
1996	Alanis Morissette	International Female Solo Artist	Nominated
1999	Alanis Morissette	International Female Solo Artist	Nominated

== Billboard ==
=== Billboard Music Awards ===
Year	Nominee / work	Award	Result
1996	Herself	Top Artist	Won
1996	Herself	Top Female Artist	Won
1996	Jagged Little Pill	Top Billboard 200 Album	Won

=== Billboard Women in Music ===
Year	Nominee / work	Award	Result
2019	Herself	Icon Award	Honoree

=== Billboard Canada Women in Music ===
Year	Nominee / work	Award	Result
2024	Herself	Icon Award	Honoree

== Canada's Walk of Fame ==
Year	Nominee / work	Award	Result
2005	Herself	Walk of Fame	Inducted

== Canadian Songwriters Hall of Fame ==
Year	Nominee / work	Award	Result	Ref.
2022	Herself	Hall of Fame	Inducted	

== ECHO Awards ==
Year	Nominee / work	Award	Result
1996	Herself	Best International Newcomer	Won
1997	Herself	Best International Female	Won
1999	Herself	Best International Female	Nominated
2000	Herself	Best International Female	Nominated
2003	Herself	Best International Female	Nominated

== GAFFA Awards ==
=== GAFFA Awards (Denmark) ===
Year	Nominee / work	Award	Result	Ref.
1995	Herself	Foreign Newcomer	Nominated	
1996	Herself	Foreign Solo Act	Won	
1998	Herself	Foreign Female Act	Nominated	
1998	"Thank U"	Foreign Song	Nominated	
2021	Herself	Foreign Solo Act	Nominated	
2021	Such Pretty Forks in the Road	Foreign Album	Nominated	

== Glamour Awards ==
Year	Nominee / work	Award	Result	Ref.
2002	Herself	Woman of the Year	Won	

== Grammy Awards ==
Year	Nominee / work	Award	Result	Ref.
1996	Herself	Best New Artist	Nominated	
1996	Jagged Little Pill	Album of the Year	Won	
1996	Jagged Little Pill	Best Rock Album	Won	
1996	"You Oughta Know"	Song of the Year	Nominated	
1996	"You Oughta Know"	Best Female Rock Vocal Performance	Won	
1996	"You Oughta Know"	Best Rock Song	Won	
1997	"Ironic"	Record of the Year	Nominated	
1997	"Ironic"	Best Music Video, Short Form	Nominated	
1998	Jagged Little Pill, Live	Best Long Form Music Video	Won	
1999	"Uninvited"	Best Rock Song	Won	
1999	"Uninvited"	Best Female Rock Vocal Performance	Won	
1999	"Uninvited"	Best Song Written for Visual Media	Nominated	
2000	"Thank U"	Best Female Pop Vocal Performance	Nominated	
2001	"So Pure"	Best Female Rock Vocal Performance	Nominated	

== Groovevolt Music and Fashion Awards ==
Year	Nominee / work	Award	Result
2005	So Called Chaos	Best Pop Album - Female	Nominated
2005	"This Grudge"	Best Pop Deep Cut	Won

== Golden Globe Awards ==
Year	Nominee / work	Award	Result
1999	"Uninvited"	Best Original Song	Nominated
2006	"Wunderkind"	Best Original Song	Nominated

== IFPI Platinum Europe Awards ==
Year	Nominee / work	Award	Result
1996	Jagged Little Pill	Award Level 1	Won
1997	Jagged Little Pill	Award Level 5	Won
1998	Jagged Little Pill	Award Level 6	Won
1998	Supposed Former Infatuation Junkie	Award Level 2	Won
2000	MTV Unplugged	Award Level 1	Won
2002	Jagged Little Pill	Award Level 7	Won

== Juno Awards ==
Year	Nominee / work	Award	Result
1992	"Too Hot"	Single of the Year	Nominated
1992	"Too Hot (Hott Shot Remix)"	Best Dance Recording	Nominated
1992	Alanis Morissette	Most Promising Female Vocalist	Won
1996	Jagged Little Pill	Album of the Year	Won
1996	Jagged Little Pill	Rock Album of the Year	Won
1996	Alanis Morissette	Female Vocalist of the Year	Won
1996	Alanis Morissette	Songwriter of the Year	Won
1996	"You Oughta Know"	Single of the Year	Won
1997	Alanis Morissette	Songwriter of the Year	Won
1997	Alanis Morissette	International Achievement Award	Won
1997	"Ironic"	Single of the Year	Won
2000	Supposed Former Infatuation Junkie	Album of the Year	Won
2000	Supposed Former Infatuation Junkie	Pop/Adult Album of the Year	Nominated
2000	"So Pure"	Best Video	Won
2000	Alanis Morissette	Songwriter of the Year	Nominated
2000	Alanis Morissette	Best Female Vocalist	Nominated
2003	"Hands Clean", "So Unsexy"	Jack Richardson Producer of the Year Award	Won
2003	Under Rug Swept	Pop Album of the Year	Nominated
2003	Alanis Morissette	Artist of the Year	Nominated
2004	Feast on Scraps	Music DVD of the Year	Nominated
2009	Alanis Morissette	Songwriter of the Year	Nominated
2009	Flavors of Entanglement	Pop Album of the Year	Won
2021	Alanis Morissette	Songwriter of the Year	Nominated
2021	Such Pretty Forks in the Road	Adult Contemporary Album of the Year	Won

== Lunas del Auditorio ==
Year	Nominee / work	Award	Result
2009	Herself	Best Foreign Pop Artist	Nominated

== MTV Europe Music Awards ==
Year	Nominee / work	Award	Result
1995	Alanis Morissette	Best New Act	Nominated
1996	Alanis Morissette	Best Female	Won
1996	"Ironic"	Best Song	Nominated

== MTV Video Music Awards ==
Year	Nominee / work	Award	Result
1996	"Ironic"	Video of the Year	Nominated
1996	"Ironic"	Viewer's Choice Award	Nominated
1996	"Ironic"	Best Direction in a Video	Nominated
1996	"Ironic"	Best Editing in a Video	Won
1996	"Ironic"	Best Female Video	Won
1996	"Ironic"	Best New Artist in a Video	Won
2000	"So Pure"	Best Choreography in a Video	Nominated

== MTV Video Music Brazil ==
Year	Nominee / work	Award	Result	Ref.
2002	"Hands Clean"	Best International Video	Nominated	

== Music Video Production Awards ==
Year	Nominee / work	Award	Result
2005	"8 Easy Steps"	Best Pop Video	Nominated
2005	"8 Easy Steps"	Best Special Effects	Nominated

== NME Awards ==
Year	Nominee / work	Award	Result	Ref.
1996	Herself	Best Solo Artist	Nominated	
1997	Herself	Best Solo Artist	Nominated	

== Online Film & Television Association ==
Year	Nominee / work	Award	Result	Ref.
1998	"Uninvited"	Best Original Song	Won	

== People's Choice Awards ==
Year	Nominee / work	Award	Result
2007	"Crazy"	Favorite Remake	Nominated
2007	"Crazy"	Favorite Song From a Movie	Nominated

== Polaris Music Prize ==
Year	Nominee / work	Award	Result	Ref.
2016	Jagged Little Pill	Heritage Award	Nominated	
2017	Jagged Little Pill	Heritage Award	Nominated	
2018	Jagged Little Pill	Heritage Award	Won	

== Pollstar Concert Industry Awards ==
Year	Nominee / work	Award	Result
1996	Herself	Best New Rock Artist Tour	Nominated
1996	Jagged Little Tour	Club Tour of the Year	Won
1997	Can't Not Tour	Major Tour of the Year	Nominated

== Q Awards ==
Year	Nominee / work	Award	Result
1996	Herself	Best New Act	Won

== Rockbjörnen ==
Year	Nominee / work	Award	Result
1996	Herself	Best Foreign Artist	Won
1996	Jagged Little Pill	Best Foreign Album	Won

== Satellite Awards ==
Year	Nominee / work	Award	Result
2000	"Still"	Best Original Song	Nominated

== Teen Choice Awards ==
Year	Nominee / work	Award	Result
2002	Herself	Choice Music: Female Artist	Nominated

== Tony Awards ==
Year	Nominee / work	Award	Result
2020	Jagged Little Pill	Best Musical	Nominated

== TVZ Awards ==
Year	Nominee / work	Award	Result	Ref.
1997	Herself	Best International Female Singer	Won	

== Viva Comet Awards ==
Year	Nominee / work	Award	Result
2002	Herself	Zuschauer-Comet VIVA Plus	Won
2002	Herself	Best International Act	Nominated

== World Music Awards ==
Year	Nominee / work	Award	Result	Ref.
1997	Herself	World's Best Selling Rock Artist	Won	
1997	Herself	World's Best Selling Alternative Artist	Won	

== Žebřík Music Awards ==
Year	Nominee / work	Award	Result	Ref.
1996	Herself	Best International Female	Won	
1996	Herself	Best International Personality	Nominated	
1996	Herself	Best International Surprise	Nominated	
1996	Jagged Little Pill	Best International Album	Nominated	
1996	"Ironic"	Best International Song	Nominated	
1996	"Ironic"	Best International Video	Nominated	
1997	Herself	Best International Female	Nominated	
1998	Herself	Best International Female	Won	
1998	"Thank U"	Best International Song	Nominated	
1999	Herself	Best International Female	Nominated	
2000	Herself	Best International Female	Nominated	
2001	Herself	Best International Female	Nominated	
2002	Herself	Best International Female	Nominated	
2004	Herself	Best International Female	Nominated	
2005	Herself	Best International Female	Nominated	
2005	Herself	Best International Personality	Nominated	
2008	Herself	Best International Female	Nominated	

== Others ==
- George and Ira Gershwin Award, UCLA, May 16, 2014 at Pauley Pavilion
- inducted into Canadian Songwriters Hall of Fame, Sept 24, 2022
