= List of Canadian Grammy Award winners and nominees =

The following is a list of Grammy Awards winners and nominees from Canada (This page only includes the competitive awards which have been won by various artists/producers, and does not include the various special awards that are presented by the Recording Academy such as Lifetime Achievement Awards, Trustees Awards, Technical Awards or Legend Awards):

Nominee	Wins	Nominations
Serban Ghenea	23	56
David Foster	16	45
Joni Mitchell	9	18
Oscar Peterson	8	12
Charles Moniz	7	7
Daniel Lanois	7	15
Alanis Morissette	7	14
Shawn Everett	6	10
Drake	5	55
Shania Twain	5	18
Celine Dion	5	16
Michael Bublé	5	12
The Weeknd	4	14
Anne Murray	4	12
Walter Ostanek	3	21
Rob McConnell	3	17
Sarah McLachlan	3	14
Neil Young	2	26
Justin Bieber	2	22
Diana Krall	2	10
Melanie Fiona	2	5
Kaytranada	2	5
Leonard Cohen	2	3
James Ehnes	2	2
Bryan Adams	1	16
Arcade Fire	1	9
Nelly Furtado	1	7
Rob Bowman	1	6
Robert Farnon	1	5
Alessia Cara	1	4
Alex Cuba	1	3
Amanda Lindsey Cook	1	3
Dan Hill	1	2
Francois Girard	1	1
John Jones	1	1
Tory Lanez	1	1
Avril Lavigne	0	8
Rush	0	7
Allison Russell	0	8
Tamia	0	6
Robin Thicke	0	5
Nickelback	0	5
Feist	0	4
Raffi	0	4
Fresh I.E.	0	2
Shawn Mendes	0	2
Spiritbox	0	2
Ron Korb	0	2
Sum 41	0	1
Alvvays	0	1
Yiddish Glory	0	1
Jayda G	0	1
