= Souleye (hip-hop artist) =

American rapper

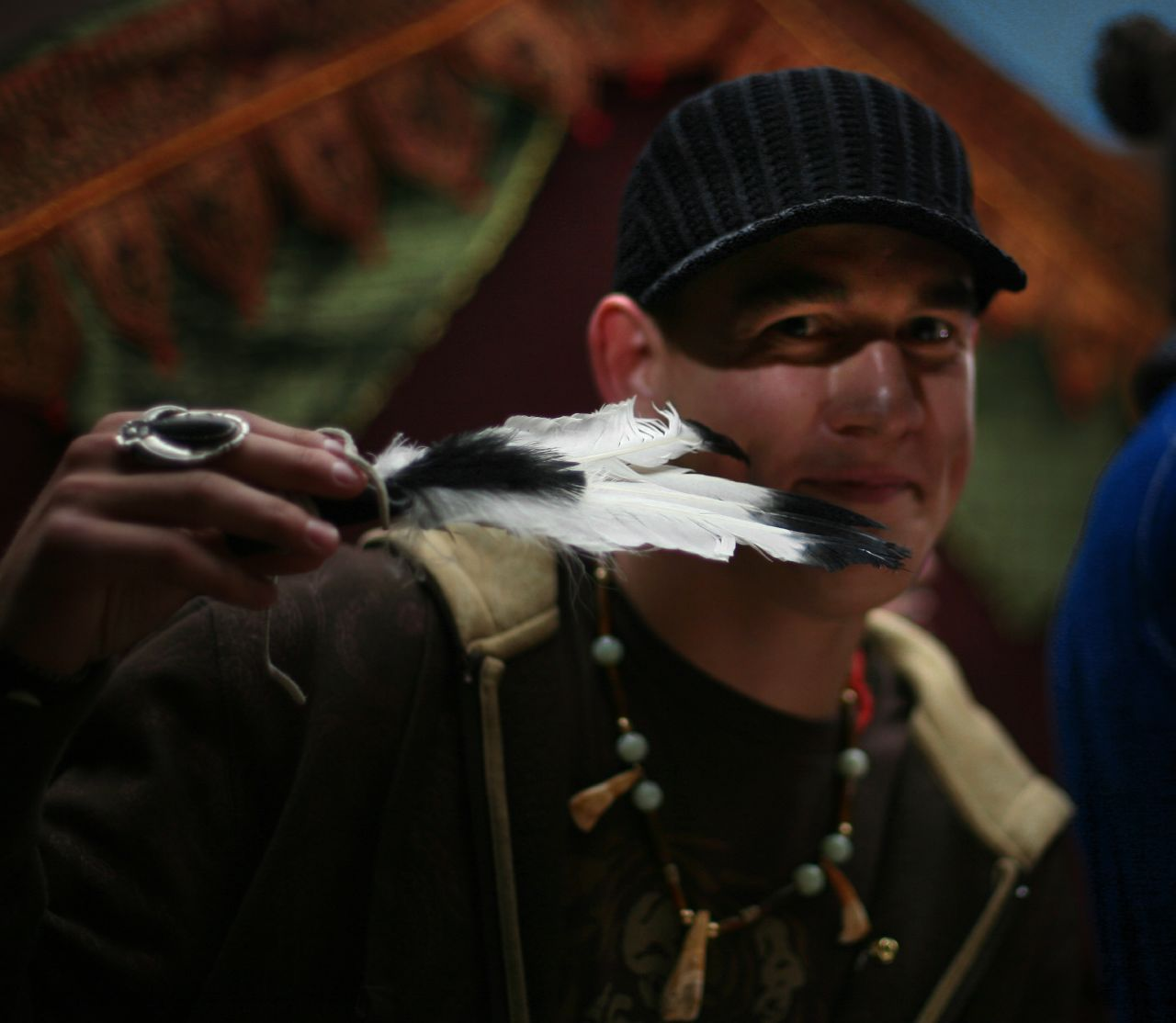
- Souleye in 2021

Background information
- Also known as: Souleye
- Born: Mario John Treadway; May 3, 1980 (age 46); Sturbridge, Massachusetts, U.S.
- Genres: Rap; hip hop; freestyle
- Years active: 2000–present
- Label: Independent
- Spouse: Alanis Morissette (m. 2010)
- Website: souleye.com

Mario John Treadway (born May 3, 1980), better known by his stage name, Souleye, is an American hip hop artist. He has released 13 albums, including his latest, Floating in Plasma, which was released in 2025. Among others, he has performed and recorded with BLVD, and his wife, Alanis Morissette.

He has collaborated in the studio with South African rock musician Esjay Jones, Lynx, Lila Rose, and rappers Big Samir, Main Flow and Chachillie.

== Early life and education ==
Souleye was born in Sturbridge, Massachusetts. He began rapping in high school. Souleye went on to attend Western New England College and played basketball for a year before leaving school. He then traveled the country, living in West Palm Beach, Florida all the way to Mount Shasta, California, Colorado, Los Angeles, and then up to the Bay Area, following his calling. He had an older brother who died by suicide.

== Career ==
=== Early years ===
In 2001 he began writing, performing and traveling with a loosely knit collective of conscious hip hop artists called the Transcendental Alliance; in 2003, he released an album titled Soul Sessions with underground hip hop artist Campaign.

The same year, Souleye's best friend was diagnosed with cancer. After his death, Souleye retreated to Mount Greylock in The Berkshires of Massachusetts, where he wrote the album Flexible Morality. In 2004, his brother died by suicide, and while cleaning out his apartment Souleye discovered that his brother had affixed a sticker which read "Music Matters" on the ceiling where he hanged himself. Given the same sticker by his brother years previously, Souleye embraced "Music Matters" as his mission statement and released UniverSoul Alchemy that same year.

In 2006, he teamed up with producer Samuel "Sleepyhead" Pohner in Asheville, North Carolina, and as Souleye & Sleepyhead, they released Intergalactic Vibes. The album won a new music contest sponsored by Relix, and as the contest winners, Souleye and Sleepyhead performed on the weeklong Jamcruise 4. While there, Souleye freestyled with Michael Franti, and was invited to play with Bassnectar. Following the Jamcruise, he performed extensively with Bassnectar. Souleye wrote and recorded the song "Amorphous Form" on Bassnectar's album Underground Communication. In 2007, Souleye joined the San Francisco-based electronic band BLVD, with whom he recorded the album Music for People. He toured with the band until 2009, and subsequently began performing once again as Souleye.

He met his wife Alanis Morissette at a meditation gathering in a Los Angeles residence in 2009, and they were married in 2010. Souleye opened Morissette's 2012 "Guardian Angel" tour and has since collaborated with her frequently. He released the album Iron Horse Running in 2013 and Identified Time in 2014.

=== Shapeshifting and WILDMAN (2015–2017) ===
In 2015, Souleye released his album Shapeshifting. The full-length album featured focus tracks, "The Victim" and "Labeled". The music video for "The Victim" premiered on Yahoo Music and "Labeled" made it to the Top 20 Official European Independent Music Charts. The album featured artwork by visual artist Rob Prior.

On November 11, 2016, Souleye released the debut single, "Follow Your Heart", to his forthcoming album WILDMAN. Following up to his first single, Souleye released "Snow Angel" featuring Alanis Morissette in January 2017. The music video premiered on Fuse TV and has been reviewed and featured by The Huffington Post. The album was produced by Crush Effect and was released in September 2017. It featured a number of other hit singles, including the title track featuring Lynx.

=== Soul School (2019) ===
In 2019, Souleye released Soul School, featuring his first collaboration with South African vocalist Esjay Jones, as well as other collaborations with 2Mex, Sabi, Donny Arcade, and Chachillie, on tracks like "Sacred Design", "Felicity" and "Come Down".

=== Hunting Teardrops and Disguised as Tomorrow (since 2021) ===
He followed up that album with 2021's hunting teardrops, once again working with painter Rob Prior on the cover. The album spun off a number of hit singles and music videos for songs like "Ghost Steps", "Incredible Hulk", "Fireside", "Doorway to the Future" and "Time's Game".

The following year, Souleye released the single 'Emergency", featuring Morissette on the song's chorus. Shortly after, he enlisted veteran music producer ill.GATES to make a remix of the song. It became his most streamed song to date.

On March 3, 2023, Souleye released his 12th full-length studio album, Disguised As Tomorrow, which features some of his most dynamic and ambitious tracks yet, including collaborations with Esjay Jones, fellow rappers Big Samir and Main Flow, and singer/songwriter and activist Lila Rose. The album has spurred a half dozen singles, including "Human Spirit", "Letter To The Old Me", "The Unheard", "Protected", "Weight of Your Soul", and "Exit the Maze", as well as "Emergency".

Disguised As Tomorrow was inspired by the COVID-19 pandemic and explores the idea that the 'tomorrow' we may anticipate for ourselves may not always be the one that comes to pass. The sound is a departure from the lighter tone of hunting teardrops, with much darker and heavier sounds. It received praise from critics. Daily Music Spin called it 'album of the year' and Stero Stickman said it was "a whole-hearted masterpiece".

== Personal life ==
Souleye and singer-actress Alanis Morissette married on May 22, 2010. They have three children.

== Discography ==
=== Albums ===
- Soul Sessions (2002)
- Flexible Morality (2003)
- UniverSoul Alchemy (2004)
- Intergalactic Vibes (2005)
- Balance in Babylon (2007)
- Music For People (with BLVD) (2008)
- Iron Horse Running (2013)
- Identified Time (2014)
- Shapeshifting (2015)
- Wildman (2017)
- Soul School (2019)
- Hunting Teardrops (2021)
- Disguised As Tomorrow (2023)
- Floating in Plasma (2025)

=== Guest appearances ===
- VokabKompany & Stephan Jacobs - "Me Against Me" single 2013
- VokabKompany - "Let it Fly" single 2013
- Apaulo 8 - "Youthful Inheritance" from Infinite Possibilities 2011
- Lila Rose - "Magick" from Osmos Your Sonica 2009
- MiMosa - "Delivery" from Hostilis 2009
- Random Rab - "Clarification of Meaning From a Rose" 2009
- STS9 - Hidden Hand, Hidden Fist from Peaceblaster The New Orleans Make it Right Remixes 2009
- Seventhswami -"Escape Artist" from Here For Now 2009
- On The One - "Love Addiction" (remix) from Love Addiction 2008
- "Shine" from The New Kong 2008
- Breakbeatbuddah - "Mind Check" from Mind Bombin 2007
- Lynx - "Just One Step" from Grain Of Sand 2007
- Bassnectar - Amorphous Form from Underground Communication 2005
