= Parallels (band) =

Canadian synthpop band

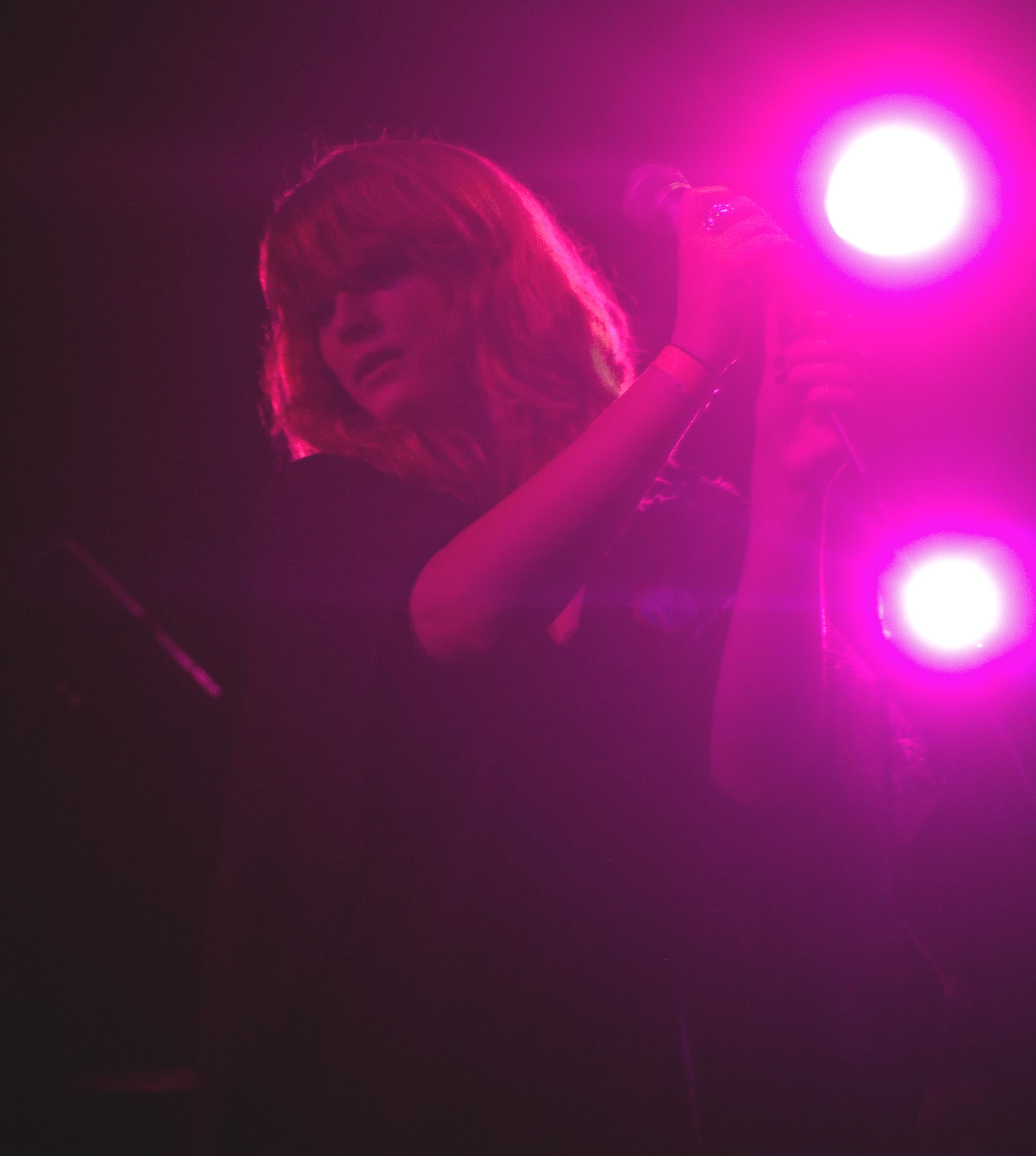
- Parallels at the Echoplex, Los Angeles California, 21 November 2009

Background information
- Origin: Toronto, Canada
- Genres: Synthwave, synthpop, electropop
- Instruments: Synthesizers, drums, vocals
- Years active: 2008–2025
- Label: The Marigold Label Lakeshore Records
- Members: Holly Dodson
- Past members: Cameron Findlay (2008–2011); Joey Kehoe (2008–2010); Nick Dodson; Oliver Blair
- Website: iloveparallels.com

Parallels was a Canadian synthpop band from Toronto, Canada led by Holly Dodson (vocalist, composer, producer). Dodson's vocals have been compared to Kate Bush and True Blue-era Madonna. In Flare Magazine's 30th anniversary issue, Dodson was featured as one of the "Hottest names to know in Canadian Music".

== History ==
=== Beginnings (2008–2011) ===
Parallels was created by Holly Dodson and Cameron Findlay. Through an exchange of emails with Dodson, they wrote their first single "Ultralight". Findlay and Dodson continued to write more material, releasing "Ultralight" as a digital single later that year, and on vinyl on Thisisnotanexit Records in London, England. They made their live debut in 2008 opening for Italians Do It Better artist Glass Candy at Wrongbar in Toronto. Parallels performed at Power Ball 11 at The Power Plant in Toronto on May 28, 2009.

Parallels' music was likened to the work of New Order and Stevie Nicks; Findlay cited acts including Kraftwerk, Eurythmics, and OMD. Now rated Parallels as critic's pick for "Best Electronic act of 2009", in their "Best of Toronto" issue. Dodson represented Parallels in Flare's 30th anniversary issue as one of the "Hottest names to know in Canadian Music". The band made their US debut at CMJ Music Marathon in New York City in October 2009.

Parallels has opened for Florence and the Machine, the Juan Maclean, Miami Horror, and Broken Social Scene.

== Visionaries (2010) ==
The band's debut album, Visionaries, was released in February 2010. Parallels song "Find the Fire" was featured on Kitsuné Maison Compilation 8 released by Kitsuné Musique. The album was nominated for an Independent Music Award for Best Album – Dance/Electronica. Parallels' song "Ultralight" was featured in episode 4, of the second season of The A-List: New York. Parallels appeared on the cover of Eye Weekly in 2010. Parallels' song "Dry Blood", from their debut album Visionaries was featured on the soundtrack for Curfew directed by Shawn Christensen, that won the 2013 Academy Award for Best Live Action Short Film.

Findlay left the band in 2011. Parallels released a 10-year Anniversary edition remaster and remix album through NewRetroWave Records in 2020 which features remixes by Valerie Collective artists Anoraak and Maethelvin.

== XII (2012) ==
The band released their second album, XII, on Marigold Records in the spring of 2012. After the departure of Findlay and Kehoe, Dodson began writing material for Parallels' second album, XII, at Marigold Studios in Toronto. In 2012, Dodson's brother Nick Dodson joined on drums and Artem Galperine on synths. XII eventually hit No. 5 on Earshot! Canada's college radio charts in 2012. The album includes a rendition of "Moonlight Desires" by Canadian artist Lawrence Gowan. Parallels performed at Fashion Magazine's 35th Anniversary party at Toronto's Distillery District's Fermenting Cellar.

== Civilization EP (2015) ==
In 2015, Parallels' Civilization EP hit No. 1 in Canada, on Earshot's "National Electronic Chart". Civilization EP includes a cover of "Age Of Consent" by British alternative group New Order. In its review of the EP, Electronic Rumors deemed Parallels "undoubtedly one of Canada's finest synthpop exports".

== Metropolis (2017) ==
Parallels' third album, Metropolis, was released on February 17, 2017. The title track was featured on CBC Radio 1's show Hear & Now as "Song of the Week". On November 18, 2016, Parallels headlined "Friday Night Live" at the Royal Ontario Museum for a crowd of 3,500 people. Their second single "I.R.L" received a video by Emmy-Award winning director Jack Chapman. The video won for "Best Music Video" at multiple independent film festivals including the Los Angeles Film Awards, Indie Memphis Film Festival, and the Canadian Diversity Film Awards. Parallels supported French band Yelle at their sold-out show at Adelaide Hall in Toronto on October 17, 2017.

Parallels made their live European debut in March 2018 at synth wave party "VHS Vision V" in Stockholm, Sweden. In November 2018, Parallels teamed up with German synth wave artist Nina for a six-date tour in the United States.

== Collaboration with Futurecop! (2018–2019) ==
Dodson collaborated with Manchester-based synthwave group Futurecop! on their single "Edge of the Universe", released by American label New RetroWave on November 23, 2018. "Edge of the Universe" was described by Vehlinggo as "huge, its potential infinite, and your connection with the song assured." The single was highlighted by Iron Skullet as one of the top 25 "Best Popwave of 2018". Its accompanying video, directed by Anise Mariko made No. 4 on NewRetroWave's "Top Ten Music Videos of 2018" list.

Futurecop! and Parallels released their second collaborative single "We Belong" on January 23, 2019. The song was featured on Spotify Canada's New Music Friday playlist. UK music blog Analogue Trash described Dodson's performance as "polished to perfection, highlighting her similarities to peak Madonna at her feisty feminist best or Robyn's sweet but assertive pop perfection. But there's no voice quite like Dodson's."

"We Belong" was followed by a third single featuring Parallels, titled "This Moment Forever" released by German imprint, Kiez Beats. Futurecop!'s full album Voltrana, featuring four songs co-written by Dodson, was released by New RetroWave on March 22, 2019.

== Proximity soundtrack (2020) ==
Dodson and her collaborator Oliver Blair (p.k.a Radio Wolf) co-wrote and produced 7-original songs comprising the soundtrack to indie sci-fi film Proximity. The film was directed by Emmy Award-winning VFX artist Eric Demeusy whose credits include Stranger Things, Game Of Thrones, and Tron: Legacy. The soundtrack was released through four-time Grammy nominated label Lakeshore Records (the independent music division of Lakeshore Entertainment). The lead single "Let Me In" was premiered on Under the Radar on August 18, 2020.

== SUPERSYMMETRY (2021) ==
SUPERSYMMETRY is the fifth Parallels studio album, written, produced, and mixed by front-woman Holly Dodson. It was released on August 27, 2021, on Toronto-based imprint Marigold Records. The photo of Dodson featured on the album cover was shot by Brad A. Kinnan.

== "He Had a Good Time" (Futurecop! & Parallels remix) (2021) ==
Parallels and Futurecop! remixed the track, "He Had a Good Time," composed by Cliff Martinez for Drive (2011 film). The remix features original lyrics and vocals by Holly Dodson. It was released as part of the remix compilation Overdrive on Lakeshore Records November 19, 2021.

== Factory Sessions EP (2023) ==
Factory Sessions is a live, visual EP recorded in Los Angeles, California, and released on May 5, 2023. The EP includes tracks from Parallels' back catalogue, as well as a cover of "Dreaming" by Blondie (band). The music videos were directed by Brad A. Kinnan and feature Holly Dodson performing alongside a live band on a soundstage. Vehlinggo reviewed it as, "Factory Sessions finds Parallels leaning into the essence of a synth-infused rock/new wave act rather than an electronic-forward Synthwave project. The result is stunning."

== "Handle With Care" (SLACKMACHINE remix) (2023) ==
In 2023, Parallels released a remix of the track "Handle With Care" by Los Angeles-based electronic artist SLACKMACHINE. The electronic music blog Vehlinggo said, "This remix of Parallels' 'Handle With Care' will still propel your body to move with its deft reinterpretation of one of the best songs off Parallels' most recent album, SUPERSYMMETRY."

== Discography ==
- Ultralight EP (2009)
- Visionaries (2010)
- XII (2012)
- Civilization EP (2015)
- Metropolis (2017)
- Proximity: Original Music From The Motion Picture (2020)
- Visionaries (10th Anniversary Edition) (2020)
- SUPERSYMMETRY (2021)
- "He Had a Good Time" (Futurecop! & Parallels Remix) (2021)
- Factory Sessions EP (2023)
- "Handle With Care" (SLACKMACHINE Remix) (2023)
