= The Stampeders =

Canadian rock trio formed in 1964

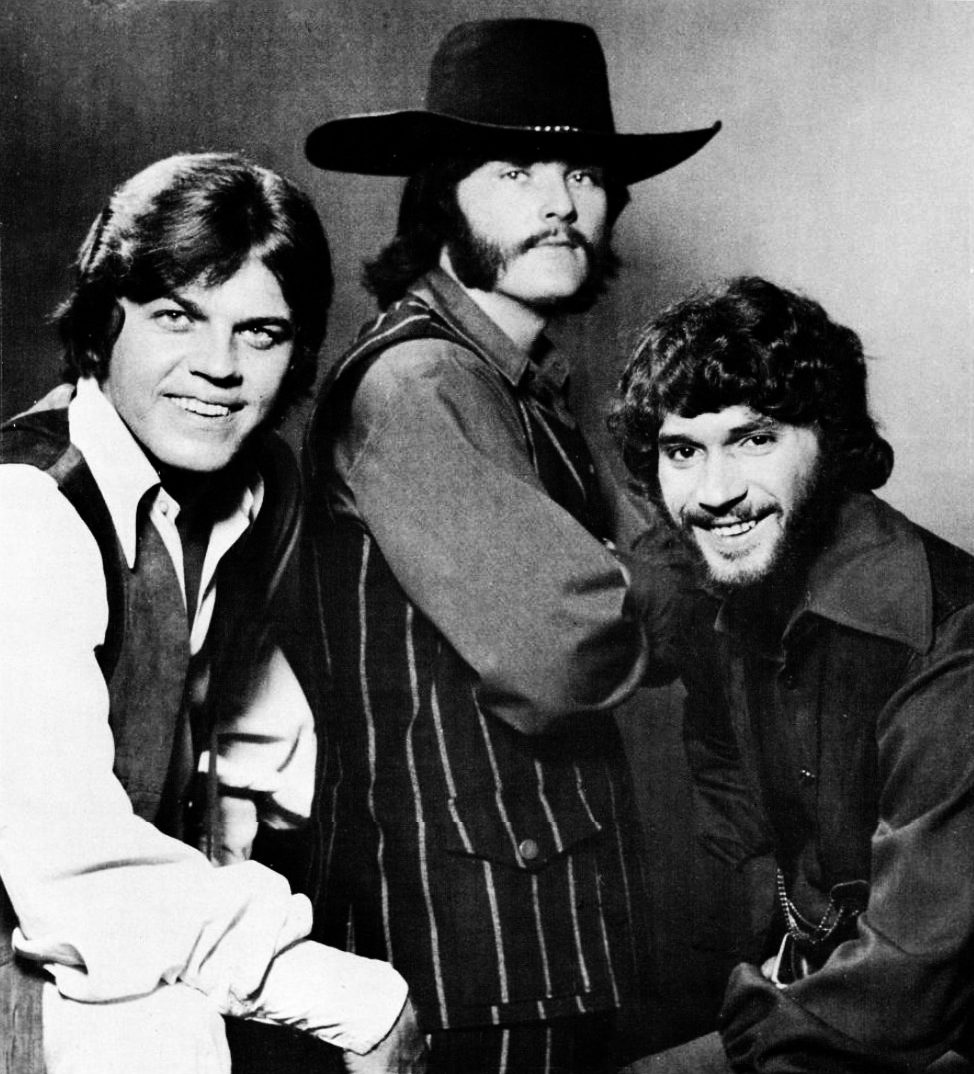
- The Stampeders in 1971, left to right, Ronnie King (bass, vocals), Rich Dodson (guitar, vocals), Kim Berly (drums, vocals)

Background information
- Origin: Calgary, Alberta, Canada
- Genres: Rock, folk rock
- Years active: 1965–1980, 1992–present
- Labels: MWC, The Marigold Label
- Members: Rich Dodson; Kim Berly; Dave Chobot
- Past members: Ronnie King; Len Roemer; Brendan Lyttle; Race Holiday; Van Louis; Gary Scrutton; Bob Allwood; Doug Macaskill; Roy Vansprang; Ian Kojima; David Norris-Elye
- Website: Official website

The Stampeders (sometimes shortened to Stampeders) are a Canadian rock trio consisting of lead guitarist and vocalist Rich Dodson, bassist Ronnie King, and drummer Kim Berly.

== History ==
Formed in Calgary, Alberta, in 1964 as the Rebounds, the band had five members: Rich Dodson (vocals, guitar, banjo), Len Roemer (guitar), Brendan Lyttle (bass), Kim Berly (real name Kim Meyer, on drums) and Kim's brother Race Holiday (real name Al Meyer, on vocals). They renamed themselves The Stampeders in 1965 and Len Roemer was replaced with Dutch-born brothers Ronnie King (real name Cornelius Van Sprang, on guitar) and Van Louis (real name Emile Van Sprang, guitar). In 1966, they relocated to Toronto and became a trio in 1968 when Lyttle, Louis and Holiday left and King switched to bass.

The Stampeders scored a hit in 1971 with "Sweet City Woman", which won Best Single at the Juno Awards, reached No.1 on the RPM magazine charts, and No.8 in the U.S. Billboard Hot 100 chart. Written by Dodson, the track stayed in the Billboard chart for 16 weeks and the disc sold a million by September 1971, and the R.I.A.A. granted gold disc status. The Stampeders also won Juno Awards for Best Group, Best Producer (Mel Shaw), and Best Composer (Dodson) that year. The band signed with Polydor Records for US distribution.

By 1975, the band had toured extensively in the United States and appeared on television shows. In 1976 they had another Canadian hit with "Hit The Road Jack", featuring Wolfman Jack, which also reached #40 on the U.S. Billboard Hot 100 chart. In Canada they produced seven top 10 hits.

Dodson left the group in 1977 and Berly and King recruited new members: Gibby Lacasse (drums, percussion), Ian Kojima (sax, flute), David Norris-Elye (saxes), Doug Macaskill (guitar) and Gary Scrutton (guitar, vocals) for the LP Platinum (1977). But Berly then departed, leaving King to continue with yet another new line-up that included Ronnie's youngest brother, Roy Van Sprang (drums), Bob Allwood (guitar, vocals), and Gary Storin (guitar, vocals) for the LP Ballsy (1979). The band broke up shortly thereafter, in 1980.

The classic three-piece group, composed of Dodson, Berly and King, officially reunited at a special concert at the Olympic Saddledome in Calgary during The Calgary Stampede in July 1992 and the following year saw them working on the first new Stampeders album in nearly twenty years. Reminiscent of their Country hybrid roots, the album contained the regional hit, "Hometown Boy", as well as updated versions of "Sweet City Woman" and "Oh My Lady" and they finally released the album in 1998 under the title Sure Beats Working.

On November 21, 2011, The Stampeders received the Lifetime Achievement Award from SOCAN at the SOCAN Awards in Toronto.

In 2015, Rich Dodson received SOCAN Classic Awards for the Stampeders songs "Monday Morning" and "Wild Eyes." They then continued to tour Canada playing fairs, festivals, casinos, and theatres.

On March 4, 2024, original member and bassist Ronnie King died at the age of 76. But the group recruited Berly's friend, bassist Dave Chobot, and have continued to make concert appearances.

== Band members ==
Current band

- Rich Dodson – guitars, vocals (1964–1977; July 1992–present)
- Kim Berly (Kimberly Meyer) – drums (1964–1978; July 1992–present); vocals (1968–1978; July 1992–present)
- Dave Chobot – bass (April 2024–present)

Previous members

- Race Holiday (Al Meyer) – vocals (1964–late 1968)
- Len Roemer – guitars (1964–early 1965)
- Brendan Lyttle – bass (1964–late 1968)
- Ronnie King (Cornelis Van Sprang) – guitars, vocals (Early 1965–late 1968); bass, vocals (Late 1968–1980; July 1992–March 4, 2024, his death)
- Van Louis (Emil Van Sprang) – vocals (Early 1965–late 1968)
- Doug Macaskill – guitars (1977–1978)
- Gary Scrutton – guitars, vocals (1977–1978)
- Ian Kojima – saxophones, flute (1977–1978)
- David Norris-Elye – saxophones (1977–1978)
- Gibby Lacasse – percussion, drums (1977–1978)
- Bob Allwood – guitars, vocals (1978–1980)
- Gary Storin – guitars, vocals (1978–1980)
- Roy Van Sprang – drums (1978–1980)

== Discography ==
=== Albums ===
Year	Album	Chart Positions		CRIA
Year	Album	CAN	US	CRIA
1971	Against the Grain (U.S. title: Sweet City Woman)	10	172	Gold
1971	Carryin' On	16	—	Gold
1973	Rubes, Dudes & Rowdies	15	—	—
1973	From the Fire	12	—	—
1974	New Day	23	—	—
1974	Backstage Pass	33	—	—
1975	Steamin	22	—	—
1976	Hit the Road	15	—	—
1977	Platinum	—	—	—
1977	The Best of the Stampeders	—	—	Gold
1979	Ballsy	71	—	—
1985	Greatest Hits Volume 1	—	—	—
1985	Greatest Hits Volume 2	—	—	—
1988	Over 60 Minutes With...The Stampeders (Greatest Hits)	—	—	—
1998	Sure Beats Working	—	—	—
2001	Over 70 Minutes With...The Stampeders (Greatest Hits)	—	—	—
2011	Live at the Mae Wilson	—	—	—

=== Singles ===
Year	Single	Chart Positions					Album
Year	Single	CAN	CAN AC	CAN Country	AUS	US	Album
1965	"House of Shake"	—	—	—	—	—	Non-album single
1967	"Morning Magic"	23	—	—	—	—	Non-album single
1968	"Be a Woman"	51	—	—	—	—	Non-album single
1969	"Crosswalk"	95	—	—	—	—	Non-album single
1971	"Carry Me" (released January 23, 1971)	2	1	11	—	—	Against the Grain
1971	"Gator Road"	—	28	—	—	—	Against the Grain
1971	"Sweet City Woman"	1	1	1	32	8	Against the Grain
1971	"Devil You"	8	—	—	—	61	Carryin' On
1972	"Monday Morning Choo Choo" / "Then Came The White Man"	9	2	—	—	—	Carryin' On
1972	"Wild Eyes"	2	—	—	—	—	Carryin' On
1972	"Carryin' On"	—	20	—	—	—	Carryin' On
1973	"Johnny Lightning"	48	—	—	—	—	Rubes, Dudes & Rowdies
1973	"Oh My Lady"	12	2	—	—	115	Rubes, Dudes & Rowdies
1973	"Minstrel Gypsy"	6	3	—	—	—	Rubes, Dudes & Rowdies
1974	"Running Wild"	18	—	—	—	—	From the Fire
1974	"Me and My Stone"	27	6	—	—	—	From the Fire
1974	"Ramona"	18	—	—	—	—	New Day
1975	"Hit the Road Jack"	6	—	—	92	40	Steamin'
1975	"New Orleans"	35	—	—	—	—	Steamin'
1976	"Playin' in the Band"	23	—	—	—	—	Hit the Road
1976	"Sweet Love Bandit"	39	—	—	—	—	Hit the Road
1976	"San Diego"	71	—	—	—	—	Hit the Road
1979	"Got My Mojo Working"	—	48	—	—	—	Ballsy
1984	"Baby with You"	—	26	—	—	—	Over Seventy Minutes with the Stampeders
1996	"Oh Belinda"	—	47	—	—	—	Sure Beats Working
1997	"Hometown Boy"	—	—	39	—	—	Sure Beats Working

== See also ==
- Music of Canada
- Category:Canadian rock music groups
