= Sweet City Woman =

Single by The Stampeders

from the album Against the Grain
- B-side: "Gator Road"
- Released: May 1971
- Recorded: 1971
- Genre: Rock, country rock
- Length: 3:27
- Label: Bell, Philips, MWC
- Songwriter: Rich Dodson
- Producer: Mel Shaw

The Stampeders singles chronology
"Gator Road" (1971)	"Sweet City Woman" (1971)	"Devil You" (1971)

Music video
- "Sweet City Woman" on YouTube

"Sweet City Woman" is a 1971 song by Rich Dodson recorded by Canadian rock band The Stampeders, appearing on their debut album Against the Grain (retitled Sweet City Woman in the US). It features a banjo as a primary instrument, which is also mentioned in the lyrics: "The banjo and me, we got a feel for singing."

== Chart performance ==
The single spent four weeks as a number 1 hit in Canada, and reached number 8 in the US. It also climbed to number 1 on the Canadian country music and adult contemporary charts. The song was also marketed in Canada by Quality Records with instrumental and French lyric versions.

=== Weekly charts ===
Chart (1971)	Peak position
Australia KMR	32
Canadian RPM Top Singles	1
Canadian RPM Adult Contemporary	1
Canadian RPM Country Tracks	1
US Billboard Hot 100	8
US Billboard Easy Listening	5
US Cash Box Top 100	7

=== Year-end charts ===
Chart (1971)	Rank
Canada RPM Top Singles	2
US Billboard Hot 100	58
US Adult Contemporary (Billboard)	32

== Awards ==
The band and song won numerous Juno Awards in 1972, including Best Single, Songwriter of the Year (guitarist Rich Dodson), Record Producer of the Year (Mel Shaw), and the band was named Canada's Top Group.

== Cover versions ==
The song has been covered by many musicians over the years, most notably:

- American country music artist Johnny Carver, in 1977. Carver's version peaked at number 48 on the Billboard Hot Country Singles & Tracks chart.
- Tompall & the Glaser Brothers, whose release went to number 34 on the same chart in 1980.

Other less known covers include one by Danish singer and actress Daimi Gentle titled "Jeg kommer" (I'm coming), released in 1973.

== Use in media ==
The song can be heard during a flashback scene in the Better Call Saul episode "Inflatable," during the ending of the Doom Patrol episode "Bird Patrol," the Adam Sandler film Little Nicky, the Condor episode “Out of His Exile,” in the Canadian commercial for "Dempster's Bread Farmer" in an episode of the Canadian comedy series Robson Arms, and in the film Real Time with Jay Baruchel.

== Personnel ==
- Produced by Mel Shaw
- Engineered by Terry Brown
- Recorded at Toronto Sound Studios, Toronto, Ontario, Canada.
- Rich Dodson – vocal, banjo, lead electric guitar
- Ronnie King – bass
- Kim Berly – drums
