= Nowhere =

Nowhere may refer to:

== Music ==
=== Albums ===
- Nowhere (album), by Ride, 1990
- Nowhere: Music from the Gregg Araki Movie, from the 1997 film (see below)
- Nowhere, an EP by Venturing (Jane Remover), 2026

=== Songs ===
- "Nowhere" (song), by Therapy?, 1994
- "Nowhere", by 112 from Pleasure & Pain, 2005
- "Nowhere", by the Birthday Massacre from Looking Glass, 2008
- "Nowhere", by Brett Kissel from The Compass Project, 2023
- "Nowhere", by Bubba Sparxxx from Deliverance, 2003
- "Nowhere", by Chris Brown from Heartbreak on a Full Moon, 2017
- "Nowhere", by Clean Bandit from What Is Love?, 2018
- "Nowhere", by Curve from Nowhere: Music from the Gregg Araki Movie, 1997
- "Nowhere", by FictionJunction Yuuka, a B-side of the single "Hitomi no Kakera", 2004
- "Nowhere", by Future from the Superfly film soundtrack, 2018
- "Nowhere", by Katatonia from Sounds of Decay, 1997
- "Nowhere", by Murderdolls from Women and Children Last, 2010
- "Nowhere", by Pantha du Prince, 2002
- "Nowhere", by the Pillows from Little Busters, 1998
- "Nowhere", by the Stitches from 8x12, 1995
- "Nowhere", by Weezer from Weezer (Gold Album), 2026
- "Nowhere (I Miss My Family)", by the Naked Brothers Band from The Naked Brothers Band, 2007

== Other art and entertainment ==
- Nowhere (1997 film), an American black comedy drama written and directed by Gregg Araki
- Nowhere (2023 film), a Spanish survival thriller film directed by Albert Pintó
- NoWhere (event), a European arts-based festival inspired by the Burning Man festival
- Nowhere, a 1985 novel by Thomas Berger
- Nowhere, Kansas, the fictional setting of the animated TV series Courage the Cowardly Dog
- Nowhere, a proposed television series developed as Lost

== Places ==
- Nowhere, Norfolk, England, United Kingdom
- Nowhere, Oklahoma, United States
- Nowhere, a location in the Atlantic Ocean, at 0° latitude, 0° longitude and 0' elevation, near Cape Three Points

== See also ==
- Bridge to Nowhere (disambiguation)
- Middle of Nowhere (disambiguation)
- Nowhere Land (disambiguation)
- Nowhere Man (disambiguation)
- Erewhon, an 1872 novel by Samuel Butler
- Knowhere, a fictional location in Marvel comics
- Utopia (disambiguation) (Latin: Nowhere, lit. 'no place')
