= Nowhere Land =

Nowhereland or Nowhere Land may refer to:

== Places and fictional locations ==
- Utopia Planitia (English: Nowhereland Plain), Mars
- Nowhereland, a Russian paratrooper training base; see List of paratrooper forces
- Nigdjezemska (Croatian: Nowhereland), Stjepan Radić, Zadar, Croatia; see Squatting in Croatia

=== Fictional locations ===
- Utopia (Greek: Nowhereland)
- 'Nowhereland', a fictional location in Peter Pan
- 'Nowhere Land', a fictional location from the 1968 The Beatles film Yellow Submarine, in the song "Nowhere Man", where Jeremy Hillary Boob lives
- 'Nowhere Land', the imaginary world of the Canadian animated children's television series Maggie and the Ferocious Beast
- The Nowhere Islands, the setting of the video game Mother 3

== Music ==
- 'Nowhereland' (band), a Greenlandic orchestra; see Music of Greenland

=== Albums ===
- Nowhere Land, a 2018 album by Olivia Olson
- Nowhere Land, a 2006 album by Mike Slamer
- Nowhere Land, a 2003 album by Kazuyoshi Saito
- The Nowhere Land, a 1999 EP by Eva Braun (band)
- Nowhere Land (The Album), a 1995 album by Club House (band)

=== Songs ===
- "Nowhereland", a 2021 single by FTRZ (Drew Arthur and Chet Hanks)
- "Nowhere Land", the ending theme song for the Japanese animated film series Princess Principal: Crown Handler
- "Nowhere Land", a 1995 song by Y&T off the album Musically Incorrect
- "Nowhere Land", a 1993 song by Treponem Pal off the album Excess & Overdrive
- "Nowhere Land", a 1986 song by Gary Zimmerman that was part of a copyright lawsuit; see The River of Dreams

== Literature ==
- "Nergensland. Nieuw Licht op migratie" (Dutch: Nowhereland. A new light on migration), a 2017 essay by Femke Halsema

=== Books ===
- Nowhereland (book), a book by Thi Bui
- Nowhere Land (novel), a 2002 novel in the Remnants (novel series)
- Nowhere-Land (novel), a 2009 novel by Andy Hill (American music producer)

== Film ==
- NowhereLand, working title of the 2009 Eddie Murphy film Imagine That
- Nowhere Land, 1998 film starring Dina Meyer
- Çamur (Turkish: Nowhere Land), 2003 film by Tayfun Pirselimoğlu; see New Turkish Cinema
- Nowhere Land, 2015 documentary film by Bonnie Ammaq
- Nowhereland aka Girl Lost, 2018 film directed by Robin Bain

== Other uses ==
- Nowherelands (exhibition), an art collection in Frac Champagne-Ardenne, France, by Jan Kopp (artist)
- Nowhere Land (exhibition), an art exposition by JonOne
- NowHere Land (play), a 2018 stageplay by Larissa Keat

== See also ==
- Neverland (disambiguation)
- Nowhere (disambiguation)
- Utopia (disambiguation) (Greek: Nowhereland)
