= Feast on Scraps =

Feast On Scraps

Compilation album (video) by Alanis Morissette
- Released: December 10, 2002
- Recorded: July–November 2001 (CD); August 13, 2002 (DVD)
- Venue: Rotterdam Ahoy (Rotterdam, Netherlands) (DVD)
- Studio: Various (CD)
- Genres: Indie rock, indie pop, neo-psychedelia
- Length: 40:58
- Labels: Maverick, Warner Bros., Warner Music Vision
- Producer: Alanis Morissette

Alanis Morissette chronology
Under Rug Swept (2002)	Feast On Scraps (2002)	So-Called Chaos (2004)

Singles from Feast on Scraps
- 1. "Simple Together" Released: 2002 (Europe and France)

Alanis Morissette video chronology
Live in the Navajo Nation (2002)	Feast On Scraps (2002)	VH1 Storytellers: Alanis Morissette (2005)

Professional ratings
Review scores
Source	Rating
Allmusic	link
Billboard	positive
MusicOMH	5/5 stars
Ultimate Guitar	10/10 stars

Feast on Scraps is an Alanis Morissette CD/DVD package released on December 10, 2002. The DVD was filmed during a concert in Rotterdam, Netherlands and the CD contains B-sides and unreleased studio tracks left off Morissette's album Under Rug Swept, which was released earlier that year. "Awakening Americans" and "Symptoms" were the only previously released songs to be omitted.

A promotional-only double A-side of "Simple Together" and "Bent for You" was released in Europe, and "Offer" was released in Brazil, becoming very popular because at the time she appeared in a famous soap opera called Celebridade (Celebrity).

"Simple Together" charted at No. 14 on Chile Top 20. "Fear Of Bliss" peak at No. 4 on the Digital Sales Top 100 chart. As of September 2008, Feast on Scraps had sold 76,000 copies in the United States according to Nielsen SoundScan.

== Track listing ==
All lyrics are written by Morissette; all music is composed by Morissette, except where noted.

CD
No.	Title	Length
1.	"Fear of Bliss"	4:38
2.	"Bent for You"	4:41
3.	"Sorry to Myself"	5:44
4.	"Sister Blister"	4:13
5.	"Offer"	4:05
6.	"Unprodigal Daughter"	4:13
7.	"Simple Together"	4:48
8.	"Purgatorying"	4:28
9.	"Hands Clean" (acoustic)	4:08
Total length:		40:51

DVD
No.	Title	Music	Length
1.	"Baba" (from Supposed Former Infatuation Junkie, 1998)	Morissette; Glen Ballard
2.	"Right Through You" (from Jagged Little Pill, 1995)	Morissette; Ballard
3.	"21 Things I Want in a Lover" (from Under Rug Swept, 2002)
4.	"Hand in My Pocket" (from Jagged Little Pill, 1995)	Morissette; Ballard
5.	"Purgatorying 1" (from Feast on Scraps, 2002)
6.	"Unprodigal Daughter" (from Feast on Scraps, 2002)
7.	"Flinch" (from Under Rug Swept, 2002)
8.	"All I Really Want" (from Jagged Little Pill, 1995)	Morissette; Ballard
9.	"Precious Illusions" (from Under Rug Swept, 2002)
10.	"Sympathetic Character" (from Supposed Former Infatuation Junkie, 1998)
11.	"Purgatorying 2" (from Feast on Scraps, 2002)
12.	"So Unsexy" (from Under Rug Swept, 2002)
13.	"Head over Feet" (from Jagged Little Pill, 1995)	Morissette; Ballard
14.	"Purgatorying 3" (from Feast on Scraps, 2002)
15.	"You Oughta Know" (from Jagged Little Pill, 1995)	Morissette; Ballard
16.	"Hands Clean" (from Under Rug Swept, 2002)
17.	"Uninvited" (from City of Angels: Music from the Motion Picture, 1998)
18.	"Ironic" (from Jagged Little Pill, 1995)	Morissette; Ballard
19.	"You Learn" (from Jagged Little Pill, 1995)	Morissette; Ballard
20.	"That Particular Time" (from Under Rug Swept, 2002)
21.	"Thank U" (from Supposed Former Infatuation Junkie, 1998)	Morissette; Ballard

== Personnel ==
- Alanis Morissette – guitars, keyboards, vocals
- Nick Lashley – guitars
- Chris Chaney – bass
- Joel Shearer – guitars
- Gary Novak – drums
- Tim Thorney – guitars and bass
- Jamie Muhoberac – keyboards
- Meshell Ndegeocello – bass on "Bent For You"
- Eric Avery – bass on "Fear of Bliss"
- Dean DeLeo – guitar on "Fear of Bliss" and "Unprodigal Daughter"
- Zac Rae – keyboards on "Sister Blister"
- Richard Causon – piano on "Simple Together"
- Suzie Katayama – conductor/arranger on "Simple Together"
- Charlie Bisharat – violin on "Simple Together"
- Larry Corbett and Rudy Stein – cello on "Simple Together"
- Blair Sinta – drums on live footage

== Certifications ==
Region	Certification	Certified units/sales
Brazil (Pro-Música Brasil)	Gold	25,000^{*}
United States	—	76,000
^{*} Sales figures based on certification alone.

== Release history ==
Country	Date
Europe	December 2, 2002
United States	December 10, 2002
United Kingdom	January 27, 2003
Japan	December 10, 2003
Latin America	January 6, 2003
South East Asia	January 6, 2003
Australia	February 17, 2003
New Zealand	February 17, 2003
