= Surrendering (song) =

Promotional single by Alanis Morissette

from the album Under Rug Swept
- Released: September 2002 (Canada)
- Genre: Folk rock
- Length: 4:35
- Label: Maverick
- Songwriter: Alanis Morissette
- Producer: Alanis Morissette

Alanis Morissette singles chronology
"21 Things I Want in a Lover" (2002)	"Surrendering" (2002)	"Everything" (2004)

"Surrendering" is a song written by Alanis Morissette, and produced by her for her fifth album, Under Rug Swept (2002).

The song was the last Morissette wrote for the album. According to her, it is "about the gratitude that I feel for someone tapping into the courage that it takes to allow themselves to be loved and to ... listen to [their fears] and still move through them. And how thrilling it is for me to be able to be let in in that kind of way. And how healing it is ultimately for both the person I'm singing about and myself." She has described it as "a very peaceful, joyful song". The subject of "Surrendering" is a man Morissette was dating as of March 2002.

== Release and reception ==
Entertainment Weekly cited the line "I embrace you for your faith in the face of adversarial forces that I represent" as an example of "some of the clumsiest lyrics to be heard on a pop record in years ... [it] may be an appropriate assessment of a relationship, but it's not a chorus." The Village Voice named it the best song on Under Rug Swept, saying it shows Morissette's "gift for the all-time pop melody". NME wrote that "Surrendering" and "Hands Clean", another track on the album, were "overwrought folk-rock [that is] destined for a thousand organic juice bars."

"Surrendering" was released to radio as the album's third single in Canada in September 2002 (see 2002 in music). By March 2003 it had reached the top ten on the playlists of radio stations such as Mix 96 and Énergie. No music video was released.
