= Nowhere Man =

Nowhere Man may refer to:

== Music ==
- "Nowhere Man" (song), a 1965 song by The Beatles
  - Nowhere Man (EP), a 1966 EP by The Beatles featuring the song "Nowhere Man"
- "Nowhere Man", a song by Anti-Nowhere League from We Are...The League
- "The Nowhere Man", a song by The Veils from The Runaway Found

== Film and television ==
- Nowhere Man (Taiwanese TV series), 2019 crime thriller drama series by Netflix
- Nowhere Man (American TV series), 1995 drama series
- Nowhere Man (Heroes), webseries based on the TV series Heroes
- "Nowhere Man" (Law & Order), 2004 episode of Law & Order
- Nowhere Man (film), 1991 Japanese film directed by and starring Naoto Takenaka
- "Nowhere Man", episode of TV series Haven
- Nowhere Man, 1961 Soviet film starring Anatoli Papanov
- Nowhere Man, 2005 film written and directed by Tim McCann
- The Nowhere Man, 2005 film starring Lorenzo Lamas
- Jeremy Hillary Boob or the "Nowhere Man", a fictional character from the 1968 Beatles film Yellow Submarine

== Literature ==
=== Comics ===
- Nowhere Man (comics), a title from Virgin Comics
- Nowhere Man, manga by Yoshiharu Tsuge published in English as The Man Without Talent
- Nowhere Man, a minor DC Comics character
- Nowhere Man, a fictional character in the Malibu Comics series Protectors
- "Nowhere Man", a chapter of the manga Peace Maker

=== Novels ===
- Nowhere Man (Hemon novel), a 2002 novel by Aleksandar Hemon
- Nowhere Man, a 2009 novel by David Gerrold
- Nowhere Man, a 2010 novel by John M. Green
- Nowhere Man, a 2011 novel by Sheila Quigley
- The Nowhere Man (Kamala Markandaya novel), a 1972 novel by Kamala Markandaya
- The Nowhere Man, a 1998 novel by Ruth Glick (writing as Rebecca York)
- The Nowhere Man (Hurwitz novel), a 2017 novel by Gregg Hurwitz

=== Nonfiction ===
- Nowhere Man: The Final Days of John Lennon, a 2000 biography by Robert Rosen

== Other uses ==
- Nowhere Man, a 2004 dance/theatre work produced by Kage Physical Theatre
- Nowhere Man, a hacker who released the Virus Creation Laboratory in 1992

== See also ==
- Nowhere Boy, 2009 British-Canadian film about John Lennon
- Nowheremen, social reality game and web video series
- Nowhere Men, comic series by Eric Stephenson
