= Eutopia (disambiguation) =

Eutopia, meaning "good place", from Greek: εὖ (“good” or “well”) and τόπος (“place”), is another term for utopia. It also refers to:

- Eutopia (EP), a 2020 extended play by Massive Attack
- "Eutopia" (short story), by Poul Anderson, 1967
- Eutopian Euphorians, an annual cultural festival organised by Meghnad Saha Institute of Technology
- Festival Eutopía09, where Grupo Yaramá run a workshop on dance and percussion

== See also ==
- Utopia (disambiguation)
- Eutonia, a genus of crane fly in the family Limoniidae
- Eutropia (died after 325), woman of Syrian origin, wife of Emperor Maximian
