= Flinch =

Flinch may refer to:

- Flinching
- Flinch (game show), a Netflix original programme
- Flinch (comics), a Vertigo Comics horror anthology
- Flinch (film), a 2021 crime thriller film by Cameron Van Hoy
- Flinch (novel), a 2001 novel by Robert Ferrigno
- "Flinch" (song), a 2002 song by Alanis Morissette on her album Under Rug Swept
- Flinch (band), a Finnish glam rock band
