= Jeremy duQuesnay Adams =

United States medieval historian (1933–2016)

Professor Jeremy Yvon duQuesnay Adams
- Born: October 1, 1933; New Orleans
- Died: May 2, 2016 (aged 82)
- Spouse: Prof. Bonnie Wheeler
- Children: Constance Adams
- Parent(s): Marie Rose Françoise Constance le Mercier du Quesnay, Philip Rhys Adams

Academic background
- Education: Harvard University
- Thesis: (1967)

Academic work
- Discipline: Historian
- Sub-discipline: Medieval literature
- Institutions: Southern Methodist University
- Notable works: Patterns of Medieval Society, Joan of Arc: Her Story (translator), The Populus of Augustine and Jerome

Jeremy duQuesnay Adams (October 1, 1933 – May 2, 2016) was a medieval historian, polymath, and translator. His interests included Joan of Arc and the Matter of Britain, as well as human groupings and exclusion.

He was an inspiration for the character Jeremy Hillary Boob in the film Yellow Submarine.
