= So Unsexy =

- German Under Rug Swept album sampler

Promotional single by Alanis Morissette

from the album Under Rug Swept
- Released: November 2003 (Brazil)
- Recorded: 2001
- Studio: Dog House Studios (Lafayette, CO)
- Length: 5:08
- Label: Maverick
- Songwriter: Alanis Morissette
- Producer: Alanis Morissette

Alanis Morissette singles chronology
"21 Things I Want in a Lover" (2003)	"So Unsexy" (2003)	"Everything" (2004)

"So Unsexy" is a song written by Alanis Morissette, and produced by her for her fifth album, Under Rug Swept (2002). It was released in Brazil as the seventh and final single in November 2003.

== Background and theme ==
According to Morissette, "So Unsexy" "basically speaks of the process of how loving myself can affect everything and change everything. Why when I don't take care of myself, or love myself or feel connected to my definition of God, everything's very painful and disjointed and disconnected and ... depressing, to be totally honest." Morissette said that when she wrote the song, she was trying to investigate "the underbelly of some of my insecurities and why little tiny things that are innocuous and inconsequential are translated in my own mind as to be taken so personally. And that has happened and still happens a lot, and while I think it's very human, it's exhausting. But as long as I have my own back, it's not as scary and it's not as horrifying."

== Release ==
Billboard wrote that "So Unsexy" "show[s] Morissette proudly wearing her affection for concise, pure-pop hooks". A separate review in the magazine of Under Rug Swept described it as "funky ... truly an every (wo)man's tale". The LA Weekly said that it "pleases, spilling a guitar wash over the hip-hop beat of Biz Markie's 'Nobody Beats the Biz'". At the 2003 Juno Awards, "So Unsexy" and "Hands Clean", another song on Under Rug Swept, won Morissette the "Jack Richardson Producer of the Year" award.

"So Unsexy" was considered for commercial release as the album's third single, but other songs were chosen as radio- and promo-only releases instead; the song was, however, promoted in Brazil. This is because the promotion for Under Rug Swept ended in North America and Europe in early 2003.

== Music video ==
The music video for the single, derived from the DVD release Feast on Scraps, is a performance of the song at Ahoy in Rotterdam, Netherlands on August 13, 2002, during Morissette's Toward Our Union Mended Tour.
