= Utopia (disambiguation) =

A utopia is an imagined community or society that possesses highly desirable or nearly perfect qualities for its citizens.

Utopia or UTOPIA may also refer to:

== Arts and entertainment ==
=== Literature ===
- Utopia (book), a 1516 book by Thomas More that coined the term 'utopia'
- Utopia (German science fiction), several science fiction series published by Erich Pabel Verlag
- Utopia (Child novel), a 2002 novel by Lincoln Child
- Utopia (comics), a 2009 crossover in Marvel Comics
- Isaac Asimov's Utopia, a 1996 science fiction novel by Roger MacBride Allen
- The Utopian (comics), a webcomic and comic book
- Utopia (Tawfik novel), 2008 novel by Ahmed Khaled Tawfik

=== Film and television ===
- Utopia (1951 film), or Atoll K, a Laurel and Hardy film
- Utopia (1983 film), a German film
- Utopia (2013 film), a documentary film about Indigenous Australians
- Utopia (2015 film), an Afghan film
- Utopia (2018 film), a Peruvian drama film
- Utopia (2024 film), a sci-fi action film directed by James Bamford
- Utopia (Australian TV series), an Australian comedy series
- Utopia (British TV series), a 2013 British drama series
  - Utopia (2020 TV series), a 2020 American adaption of the British series
- Utopia (Dutch TV series), a 2014 Dutch reality TV series by production company Endemol
  - Utopia (2014 American TV series), a 2014 American reality series based on the 2014 Dutch series
  - Ütopya, a 2014–2015 Turkish reality series based on the Dutch series
- "Utopia" (Doctor Who), a 2007 episode
- "Utopia" (The World Between Us: After the Flames), a 2025 episode
- Utopia (company), an American film production, distribution

=== Television and radio stations ===
- Utopía TV, a defunct Argentine pirate television station
- Utopia FM, a radio station at the University of Sunderland, England

=== Music ===
- Utopia, a 1973 studio project related to Amon Düül II
- Utopia (orchestra), an international festival orchestra
- Utopia (band), an American progressive rock group
- Utopia (Brazilian band), a rock band from Brazil
- Utopia, Limited, an 1893 Gilbert and Sullivan comic opera

==== Albums ====
- Todd Rundgren's Utopia (album), 1974
- Utopia (Utopia album), 1982
- Utopía, a 1992 album by Joan Manuel Serrat
- Utopia (Unexpect album), 1999
- Utopia, a 2003 album by Deen
- (N)utopia, a 2005 album by Graveworm
- Utopía (Belinda Peregrín album), 2006
- Utopia (Axxis album), 2009, or the title song
- Utopia (EP), a 2013 extended play by Kerli
- Utopia (Gothminister album), 2013, or the title song
- Utopia (360 album), 2014
- Utopian (album), a 2016 album by Virginia to Vegas
- Utopia, a 2017 album by Serena Ryder, or the title song
- Utopia (Björk album), 2017, or the title song
- Utopía (Romeo Santos album), 2019
- Utopia (Travis Scott album), 2023

==== Songs ====
- "Utopia" (Alanis Morissette song), 2002
- "Utopia" (Goldfrapp song), 2000
- "Utopia" (Tom Dice song), 2012
- "Utopia" (Within Temptation song), 2009
- "Utopia", a song by Jackson and His Computerband
- "Utopia", a song by Austra
- "Utopia", a song by Ateez

=== Video games ===
- Utopia (1982 video game), a 1982 Intellivision simulation game
- Utopia: The Creation of a Nation, a 1991 computer strategy game
- Utopia (1998 video game), a 1998 browser MMO
- "Utopia", an episode of Angry Birds Space

=== Other ===
- Utopia (comedy duo), a Japanese comedy duo
- Utopia (typeface), a typeface by Robert Slimbach

== Places ==
- Utopia, Northern Territory, Australia
- Utopia, New Brunswick, Canada
- Utopia Planitia, a large impact crater basin on Mars
- Utopia Island (Almere), an artificial island on the Floriade 2022 expo site in the Netherlands

=== United States ===
- Utopia, West Park, Florida
- Utopia, Kansas
- Utopia, Queens, New York
  - Utopia Parkway (Queens), a street in New York
- Utopia, Ohio, a former anarchistic community
- Utopia, Texas

== Science and technology ==
- UTOPIA (bioinformatics tools)
- System Packet Interface or Utopia, an ATM protocol specification
- Utopia (beetle), a genus of beetles

=== Internet ===
- Utopia (internet forum), Chinese internet forum
- Utopia (marketplace), a former darknet market
- Utopia (website), a web portal based in Bangkok, Thailand
- Utah Telecommunication Open Infrastructure Agency, a consortium of Utah cities

== Transportation ==
- SS Utopia, a British steamship that sank in 1891 with the loss of 562 passengers and crew
- Utopia (cruise ship), a planned residential cruise ship
- Utopian (automobile), an early English automobile
- Pagani Utopia, an Italian sports car

== Other uses ==
- Utopian socialism, the first currents of modern socialist thought
- Utopia University, a defunct university in Shanghai
- Utopias (beer), a beer made by Samuel Adams

== See also ==
- Eutopia (disambiguation)
- Utopians (disambiguation)
- Uthopia (2001–2025), a British dressage horse
- "Youtopia", song by Armin van Buuren
- Zootopia, Disney animated film featuring animals
- Utopian and dystopian fiction
- Nowhere Land (disambiguation) (Latin: Utopia, lit. 'Nowhereland')
