= Utopia (Alanis Morissette song) =

Song by Alanis Morissette

Promotional single by Alanis Morissette

from the album Under Rug Swept
- Released: July 2003 (US)
- Recorded: 2001
- Length: 4:58
- Label: Maverick
- Songwriter(s): Alanis Morissette
- Producer(s): Alanis Morissette

Alanis Morissette singles chronology
"Simple Together" (2002)	"Utopia" (2003)	"So Unsexy" (2003)

"Utopia" is a song written by Alanis Morissette, and produced by her for her fifth album, Under Rug Swept (2002).

== Background and theme ==
The song was partly inspired by Morissette's experiences during her trips across the world between the recording sessions for Under Rug Swept, and in particular her stay at a Navajo reservation. According to her, "There's a thread of continuity, subject matter-wise, that permeates not only every trip I take, but every interaction I have"; she said she thought the "sense of community the Navajo people really focus on" was similar to the sense of community she felt when touring in the Middle East."

Morissette said that from the second she wrote it, she knew it would be the final song on the album. "When I think of the album," she said, "I think about the questions and the conflicts and then the responses and the rebuttals and there's sort of this crazy little walk through this dynamic, this relationship. And at the end, it has the feminine and the masculine elements, whether that's taken literally or figuratively. For me, it's like they're sitting together in the same car and are finally driving down the same road in the same direction and there's a meeting of both worlds."

Originally, the song's final pre-chorus was to repeat the lyrics from the first pre-chorus. Morissette said, however, that after 9/11, she felt inspired to write another pre-chorus. Given the context in which it was written, that verse stands strongly as arguably the most moving part of the song.

== Release ==
In late September 2001, in response to the September 11, 2001 terrorist attacks, Morissette previewed "Utopia" on her website. She said she wanted the song to comfort the people who were grieving; according to her, it "sheds light on the willingness to understand" and "the passionate desire to stand up and show a self-care and self-respect". The Record described "Utopia" as one of the songs on the album that displayed "a soulful introspection and spiritual awareness" appropriate for a "post-9/11 universe".

Rolling Stone described the song as "a wistful, waltzing vision of a perfectly understanding world ... in which Morissette becomes an airy Celtic choir"; it said it "sounds like an eternal group-therapy session".

"Utopia" was released as a radio-only promotional single in the United States (where it was the third single from the album) in 2003; no music video was released.
