= Zvezda (cinema) =

Squatted cinema in Belgrade, Serbia

Coordinates: 44°49′04″N 20°27′25″E

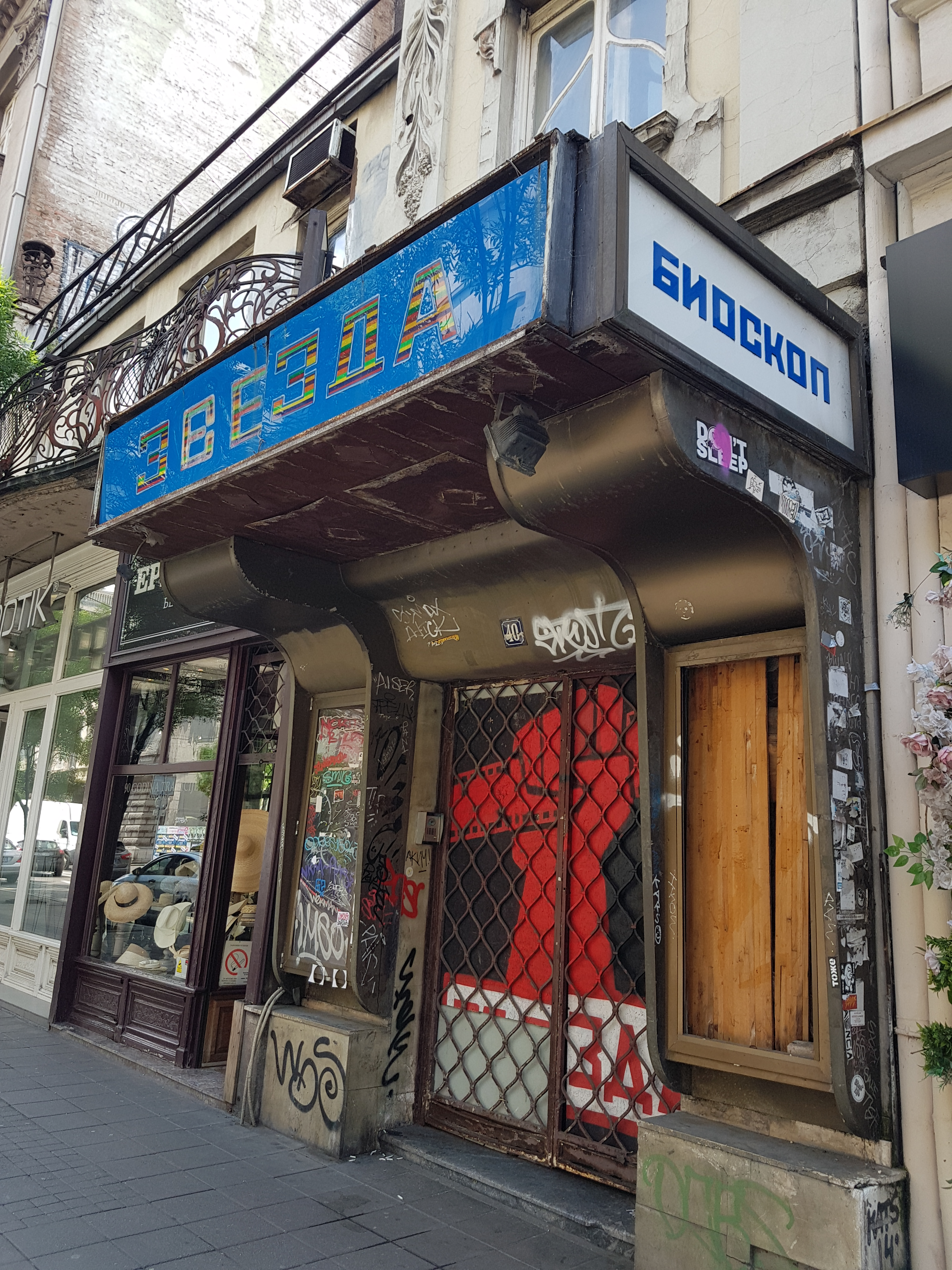
Exterior in 2023

Novi Bioskop Zvezda (Serbian: Нови биоскоп Звезда) is a squatted cinema in Belgrade, Serbia. Built in 1911, it is the oldest cinema in the city. After a period of dereliction, it was occupied in 2014 by the Movement for the Occupation of Cinemas. The squatters received international support and a documentary was released in 2018 about the occupation.

== History ==
The cinema opened as the Koloseum, with an Art Nouveau frontage. Built in 1911, it is the oldest in Belgrade. Under the Socialist Federal Republic of Yugoslavia it was renamed as the Star (Serbian: Zvezda). Zvezda was owned by the state-run company Beograd Film but was sold off to derivatives trader Nikola Djivanovic in 2007. He flipped it to an equity investor, Lantern International, and the cinema was closed down. Although the terms of the contract had specified that the cinema should stay open, this clause was ignored. In 2012, Djivanovic was convicted to two years in prison on various charges.

After years of dereliction, the cinema was squatted by 200 people under the banner of the Movement for the Occupation of Cinemas in 2014. It was renamed Novi Bioskop Zvezda (New Star Cinema). The activists included Dobrica Veselinović and film director Luka Bursac, the occupation quickly received media coverage worldwide. It was supported by Michel Gondry, who made a short film dedicated to the project and Greek prime minister Alexis Tsipras, who visited the space when he was in Belgrade. Djivanovic spoke with the squatters and commented "I feel great pity for them [...] Imagine being an artist in Serbia. You might as well commit suicide immediately." Other supporters were philosophers Srećko Horvat and Alain Badiou. The first film screened by the occupiers was Innocence Unprotected by Dušan Makavejev.

== In popular culture ==
In 2018, Senka Domanović released a documentary entitled Occupied Cinema about the occupation. It premiered at the South East European Film Festival.

== See also ==
- Squatting in Serbia
- Outdoor cinema
