= Utopians =

Utopians may refer to:

- Utopians (film), a 2015 film by Hong Kong filmmaker Scud
- Those who believe in the principles behind, or the likelihood of the existence of, Utopia

== See also ==
- Utopia (disambiguation)
