= Under Rug Swept =

Studio album by Alanis Morissette
- Released: February 26, 2002
- Recorded: July–November 2001
- Studios: Great Big Music, Dog House Studios, Westlake Recording Studios, Royaltone Studios, Larrabee Sound Studios
- Genres: Alternative rock; pop rock
- Length: 50:23
- Labels: Maverick; Warner Bros.
- Producer: Alanis Morissette

Alanis Morissette chronology
MTV Unplugged (1999)	Under Rug Swept (2002)	Feast on Scraps (2002)

Singles from Under Rug Swept
- 1. "Hands Clean" Released: January 8, 2002; 2. "Precious Illusions" Released: May 20, 2002

Under Rug Swept is the fifth studio album by the Canadian singer-songwriter Alanis Morissette. It was released in the United Kingdom on February 26, 2002, and in the United States the following day by Maverick Records. It was the first album to be written and produced solely by Morissette. The title is taken from a lyric in the lead single, "Hands Clean".

Music critics praised Under Rug Swept for its lyrical content, rawness, and vocal performances. The album debuted atop the Billboard 200 and topped the charts of 11 other countries. While sales did not match those of Morissette's preceding two albums, Under Rug Swept sold over 4 million copies worldwide.

== Background and production ==
Before recording of the album began, when she had not written songs or journal entries for nine months, Morissette went to Toronto not knowing whether she was going to write songs herself or with someone else. In the first week of her stay she had written seven songs alone, and she described the writing process as "really fast and accelerated". As on her previous albums, Morissette took a stream-of-consciousness approach to the songwriting. She wrote the music and lyrics at the same time, spending around twenty minutes or less on each song, and recorded the vocals during the writing process, in one or two takes. "I really wanted to make sure that I wrote in the studio so that, while I was writing, I could be singing it at the same time", she said. According to Morissette, she had a "little space station" with a keyboard, an acoustic guitar, an electric guitar, her journal and a microphone set up, and everything was recorded onto DAT. Morissette had not planned to produce an album on her own, saying "It was just a matter of when it would happen organically". She "kept things from becoming overwhelming" by refraining from cross-connecting her producing, songwriting and performing duties.

Production of the album was delayed when Morissette became involved in disputes with executives at Maverick Records after she testified at U.S. Government hearings against artist-unfriendly record contract practices. As she put it, she had to go through lawyers to "have a dialogue with people" and take an extended period of time to "have one little thing figured out". Because she was accustomed to having the producers on her albums act as "the buffer to the outside world" during recording, she found it a challenge to handle the situation on her own. "I was trying to be isolated enough to tap into my artistry while keeping people at bay who don't know fuck all about nurturance", she said. Eventually, it became "too much" for Morissette and she took negotiations into her own hands, which meant she had to halt her work on the album: "I had to be willing to throw the record away and not ever release it."

Despite the relatively low sales of Morissette's previous two albums, Supposed Former Infatuation Junkie (1998) and MTV Unplugged (1999), compared to those of her international debut album, Jagged Little Pill (1995), Maverick Records considered her a strong commercial asset and were concerned that she would leave because of the disputes and release the album on another label. For a time Morissette was threatening to leave Maverick (according to Entertainment Weekly), until label founder Madonna intervened and persuaded her to stay. During the delay, Morissette brought in musicians such as bassists Eric Avery (formerly of Jane's Addiction) and Flea (of Red Hot Chili Peppers), Dean DeLeo (guitarist for Stone Temple Pilots) and Me'shell Ndegeocello to play on the album. After this period, in response to the September 11 attacks, she previewed the track "Utopia" that she wrote in January 2002 on her website.

During the making of the album, Morissette wrote 27 songs, which she eventually narrowed down to 17. When she was mixing and producing the album, every time she reached the 11th track she, as she put it, "would shut down. My brain would shut off and I just felt like it was information overload ... I didn't want to overwhelm myself or anyone else in the process of trying to cram them all onto the double CD." She planned for several of the excluded songs to be released as single B-sides or on a separate EP to be released after the album; eight of them were released on a CD/DVD package, Feast on Scraps, released in late 2002. "I just could not face the idea of letting all of these songs go", she had said. "They're all precious to me. It's just a matter of finding the right framework in which to share them with the world."

== Themes ==
Morissette has said that during the writing and recording of the album, she noticed a unifying theme emerging of "the desire to mend unions and bridge gaps. Whether it be between genders or between human beings, between spirits." She said that when she began working on the album, she was at "the middle of the beginning of the end of a relationship", and that entering the studio and writing new material "would propel me to face some of the truths that were scaring me. Inevitably, we ended up breaking up, so the record kind of followed the grieving of it, then the proverbial phoenix rising and continuing to grow." Under Rug Swept was also influenced by the extensive travelling Morissette did between recording sessions, particularly her stay at a Navajo reservation: "The sense of community the Navajo people really focus on, there's a similar sense of community I felt when I traveled, when we toured through the Middle East", she explained. "It permeates what I yearn for and I try to create it as best as I can through the songs". She described the album as melodically and sonically "more structured" than her previous album, Supposed Former Infatuation Junkie (1998).

The first track, "21 Things I Want in a Lover", features Morissette listing the qualities she looks for in a partner. "There's a part of this song where I'm joking, but there's a whole part of this song where I'm dead serious", she said. "Because the palm sweating, heart palpitating beginnings of a relationship often result in a huge amount of incompatibility, so the concept of compatibility is so much more important to me as I get older." "Narcissus" describes, as Morissette puts it, "that dichotomy of loving someone and really wanting it to work and wanting to bridge the gap and bridge the chasm and, yet at the same time, being totally repulsed by the qualities that are being presented and the pain that comes from it." She said the intention of writing "Hands Clean" was "to get to a place where I could be as truthful and as honest as I possibly could be about certain relationships in my past ... oftentimes I feel by not speaking the truth, by being silent, there's an element of an untruth in that ... [it] sometimes can feel just as horrible as a lie to me."

"Flinch", the fourth track, was written about an experience Morissette had during which she almost ran into a man who had a profound effect on her: "I was surprised at how many years had passed but still I was responding to the situation as though I had been spending time with him two minutes earlier ... I do believe that I will be able to get to a point where hearing his name or even running into him or hearing from him won't trigger me as much as it did and still does." With "So Unsexy", Morissette said she was "really trying to get into the underbelly of some of my insecurities and why little tiny things that are innocuous and inconsequential are translated in my own mind as to be taken so personally ... as long as I have my own back, it's not as scary and it's not as horrifying." In "Precious Illusions" she discusses "the difference between really being alive and really embracing the reason why I'm here on this earth versus my just being asleep and sleep walking and accepting the status quo and accepting somewhat of a suffering mentality to being here. It really is my responsibility to distinguish the difference between the two and choose which one I want."

Track seven on the album, "That Particular Time", documents a breakup and "the three distinct chapters in the relationship" Morissette was going through. "[Love] took many different forms, and I was beating myself up for a long time for being in a relationship that just didn't feel right", she said. "But then I realized that it was a very loving act for me to stick it out for a minute or two to really kind of see whether there was something worth continuing to explore in a romantic way. A Man, which is written from a male point of view as a response to "Narcissus", "For once I try to feel a bit of empathy and to imagine how it feels being a man in these confusing times ... I try to react as an honourable man to the vibes of erroneous machos who are damaging the image of my sex. "You Owe Me Nothing in Return" is, in Morissette's words, "about the real definition of what love is ... wanting for someone that you love what they want for themselves. And at the same time not sacrificing my own life and my thoughts and my own beliefs. Supporting someone in their choices and at the same time being able to express what mine are, even if they differ, is the ultimate healthy, loving interaction."

The tenth and penultimate track, "Surrendering", was the last song Morissette wrote for the album. According to her, it is "about the gratitude that I feel for someone tapping into the courage that it takes to allow themselves to be loved and to drop the defenses and fears ... And how thrilling it is for me to be able to be let in that kind of way ... It's a very peaceful, joyful song". Morissette considers "Utopia" a summary of the feminine and masculine elements in the relationship chronicled in the album: "For me, it's like they're sitting together in the same car and are finally driving down the same road in the same direction and there's a meeting of both worlds." She said that when she wrote it, she knew it would be the last track.

Morissette wrote several political songs such as "Awakening Americans" and "Symptoms" during the making of the album, but she decided not to include such material in spite of an online petition lobbying for their release. Morissette said she doesn't "resonate" with overtly political songs because they are "removed too much" from her personal experiences: "I love sitting up at two in the morning talking religion, but when it comes to my songs, it's just rambling, soapbox, obnoxious", she said. "Awakening Americans" and "Symptoms" were eventually released as B-sides.

== Promotion ==
Under Rug Swept was closely guarded before its release: for journalists to listen to it, they had to be invited to Maverick Records headquarters and listen to a single play copy in a special listening room. In July 2001 Geoff Mayfield of Billboard was quoted as saying that because of the popularity of artists such as Radiohead and Staind, it was a "good year for rock ... It's not just one kind of rock that's connecting right now — the palette is varied. For an artist [such as Morissette] who comes from rock, this could be a fertile time." Other industry insiders said it may become a commercial return to form for Morissette; The Record noted Morissette's age- and gender-transcendent appeal, the "smart" lyrics on the album and the appropriateness of its "soulful introspection and spiritual awareness" in a post-9/11 society, and how Morissette "stands out from everyone else on radio ... there are few artists addressing relationships in a serious way, especially from a female point of view."

"Hands Clean", the album's first single, began receiving radio airplay in the United States on January 8, 2002, and it debuted at number one in Canada following its physical release while also reaching number one in New Zealand. It peaked inside the top 40 on the Billboard Hot 100 in the US, where it was most successful at Adult Top 40 and Hot AC radio; in one week more Hot AC stations added the single to their playlists than any other song in history. It was considered a comeback single for Morissette, and it was her most successful single since 1998 in most countries, reaching the top ten in Australia and the top 20 in the United Kingdom. For February, the album's month of release, Morissette was "Artist of the Month" on AOL Music and also performed at the 2002 Winter Olympics in Salt Lake City, Utah.

== Critical reception ==
Professional ratings
Aggregate scores
Source	Rating
Metacritic	61/100
Review scores
Source	Rating
AllMusic	3.5/5 stars
Blender	4/5 stars
Entertainment Weekly	C+
The Guardian	3/5 stars
Los Angeles Times	2.5/4 stars
NME	1.5/5 stars
Q	4/5 stars
Rolling Stone	3/5 stars
Slant Magazine	3.5/5 stars
Spin	7/10
The Village Voice	A−

Reviews of Under Rug Swept on its release were generally positive. Billboard described the album as "supreme" and "very human ... [it] satisfies with moments of darkness, enlightenment, anger, bittersweet tension, and happiness ... Although 2002 is still young, consider Under Rug Swept one of the year's best." Q magazine said the album was "a smart shot across the bows ... some of the most inviting music of her career ... Morissette has fashioned a lyrical Trojan Horse to be wheeled into unsuspecting homes for months to come." Robert Christgau wrote, "The pop-rock here lacks the faux-punk edge [on Jagged Little Pill] ... But Morissette instantly demonstrates her gift for the catchy ... topping memorable verse with indelible chorus, she's a self-actualized nut who goes for what she wants, exactly as pretentious as the college girls she represents for." According to LA Weekly, the album "is Alanis Morissette in top form, exercising her God-given right to vent and sound beautiful doing so."

Other critical appraisals were less favorable. Rolling Stone, in a three-star review, wrote "The music is brawny and meticulous ... [but] Under Rug Swept just about drowns in psychobabble. While the tone of the songs, and the grain of Morissette's voice, promise intimacy, there's hardly a private detail anywhere." Entertainment Weekly said "the album's garbled title is also preparation for some of the clumsiest lyrics to be heard on a pop record in years ... The songs are riddled with such overwritten Psych 101 ruminations." The Village Voice criticised the lyrics, saying "Much like even non-football fans used to be mesmerized by [Howard] Cosell's genius for never using two words when 23 would do, you don't have to be a love-damaged 17-year-old girl to find Under Rug Swept's dense verbiage a trip. Words tumble forth and arrange themselves kaleidoscopically into all sorts of unusual categories ... I'm just not sure that pop music should come out of a thesaurus." NME called it "a tedious album" with "overwrought folk-rock like 'Surrendering' and 'Hands Clean' destined for a thousand organic juice bars. Lyrically, it's often hilarious ... This record moves way beyond armchair psychology — in fact, there are armchairs that have a cannier grasp of the mind."

Under Rug Swept received a Juno Award nomination in the category of Pop Album of the Year. Morissette herself won the Jack Richardson Producer of the Year award for the songs "Hands Clean" and "So Unsexy", and she was nominated in the Artist of the Year category. (For more information, see Juno Awards of 2003.)

== Commercial performance ==
Under Rug Swept entered the Canadian albums chart at number one with first week sales of 35,000 copies, and the CRIA certified it platinum the following month for shipments of 100,000. In the US the album sold 215,000 copies in its first week, debuting at number one on the Billboard 200 chart during a busy sales week following the 2002 Grammy Awards ceremony; it stayed in the top spot for a week. Within a month of release it had sold 500,000 copies, and the RIAA certified it platinum for shipments of over one million. Under Rug Swept debuted at number one in 12 countries, including Germany, Japan, and Australia. It debuted at number two in France and the United Kingdom, where the BPI certified it gold for shipping 100,000 copies.

The album stayed in the top 20 on the Billboard 200 for five weeks and on the chart for 24. A second single, "Precious Illusions", was released on May 20, 2002, and reached number four in Canada, but it failed to chart on the US Hot 100 or inside the top 40 in Australia or the UK. Later in 2002, Morissette embarked on a world tour, which did not pick up album sales. In August she performed at the V2002 festival in England. After the failure of "Precious Illusions", Maverick did not commercially release any more singles from the album, although "So Unsexy" was tentatively slated as the third single at one point. Promotional singles were issued internationally: "Flinch" and "So Unsexy" in Brazil, "21 Things I Want in a Lover" in Latin America, "Surrendering" in Canada, and "Utopia" in the US.

As of March 2012, Under Rug Swept has sold 1,020,000 copies in the US, less than half the amount sold by Supposed Former Infatuation Junkie by the same date. According to a Maverick Records press release, Under Rug Swept had sold 3.8 million copies worldwide by February 2004.

== Track listing ==
All tracks are written by Alanis Morissette.

No.	Title	Length
1.	"21 Things I Want in a Lover"	3:28
2.	"Narcissus"	3:38
3.	"Hands Clean"	4:31
4.	"Flinch"	6:03
5.	"So Unsexy"	5:08
6.	"Precious Illusions"	4:11
7.	"That Particular Time"	4:21
8.	"A Man"	4:33
9.	"You Owe Me Nothing in Return"	4:57
10.	"Surrendering"	4:35
11.	"Utopia"	4:58
Total length:		50:23

Japanese bonus tracks
No.	Title	Length
12.	"Sister Blister"	4:11
13.	"Sorry to Myself"	5:43
Total length:		60:17

== Personnel ==
- Alanis Morissette – lead vocals, guitar, keyboards, producer, creative director
- Rob Jacobs – recording
- Brad Nelson – recording
- Chris Fogel – mixing (tracks 1–6, 8–11)
- Rob Jacobs – mixing (track 7)
- Nick Lashley – guitar
- Joel Shearer – guitar
- Tim Thorney – guitar, bass guitar
- Dean DeLeo – guitar (tracks 1 and 6)
- Jamie Muhoberac – keyboards
- Mark Stephens – keyboards, piano
- Richard Davis – keyboards, Pro Tools, engineer
- Carmen Rizzo – keyboards, programming, engineer
- Chris Chaney – bass guitar
- Flea – bass guitar (track 2)
- Meshell Ndegeocello – bass guitar (tracks 5, 9)
- Eric Avery – bass guitar (track 6)
- Chris Bruce – bass guitar (track 3)
- Gary Novak – drums and percussion
- Richard Causon – piano (track 7)
- Andrew Scheps – additional Pro Tools editing
- Michael Harlow – engineer
- Brian Walters – assistant engineer
- Jeremy Janeczko – assistant engineer
- Lior Goldenberg – assistant engineer
- Alex Uychocde – assistant engineer
- Kevin Guarnieri – assistant engineer
- Aaron Fessel – assistant engineer
- Pete Novak – assistant engineer
- Chris Wonzer – assistant engineer
- Jeff Rothchild – assistant engineer
- Jason Brennan – mix engineer
- Bryan Carrigan – mix engineer
- Rick Tapper – assistant mix engineer
- Carlos Cano – assistant mix engineer
- Vince Giannini – guitar technician
- Bruce Nelson – guitar technician
- Jeremy Janeczko – drum technician
- John Talbot – keyboards technician
- Rich Mazzetta – Dean's guitar technician
- Dave Lee – Flea's bass technician
- Shari Sutcliffe – coordinator
- Rankin – photography
- Frank Maddocks – creative director, art direction and design

== Charts ==
=== Weekly charts ===
Weekly chart performance for Under Rug Swept
Chart (2002)	Peak position
Australian Albums (ARIA)	1
Austrian Albums (Ö3 Austria)	1
Belgian Albums (Ultratop Flanders)	3
Belgian Albums (Ultratop Wallonia)	2
Canadian Albums (Billboard)	1
Danish Albums (Hitlisten)	9
Dutch Albums (Album Top 100)	2
European Top 100 Albums (Music & Media)	1
Finnish Albums (Suomen virallinen lista)	3
French Albums (SNEP)	2
German Albums (Offizielle Top 100)	1
Hungarian Albums (MAHASZ)	13
Irish Albums (IRMA)	1
Italian Albums (FIMI)	1
Japanese Albums (Oricon)	11
New Zealand Albums (RMNZ)	11
Norwegian Albums (VG-lista)	1
Scottish Albums (Official Charts)	2
Spanish Albums (PROMUSICAE)	9
Swedish Albums (Sverigetopplistan)	3
Swiss Albums (Schweizer Hitparade)	1
UK Albums (Official Charts)	2
US Billboard 200	1

=== Year-end charts ===
Year-end chart performance for Under Rug Swept
Chart (2002)	Position
Australian Albums (ARIA)	55
Austrian Albums (Ö3 Austria)	13
Belgian Albums (Ultratop Flanders)	100
Belgian Albums (Ultratop Wallonia)	67
Canadian Albums (Nielsen SoundScan)	42
Dutch Albums (Album Top 100)	30
European Albums (Music & Media)	21
French Albums (SNEP)	66
German Albums (Offizielle Top 100)	16
Italian Albums (FIMI)	37
Swedish Albums (Sverigetopplistan)	100
Swiss Albums (Schweizer Hitparade)	16
UK Albums (OCC)	107
US Billboard 200	77
Worldwide Albums (IFPI)	33

== Certifications ==
Certifications and sales for Under Rug Swept
Region	Certification	Certified units/sales
Australia (ARIA)	Platinum	70,000^{^}
Austria (IFPI Austria)	Gold	20,000^{*}
Belgium (BRMA)	Gold	25,000^{*}
Brazil (Pro-Música Brasil)	Platinum	125,000^{*}
Canada (Music Canada)	Platinum	100,000^{^}
France (SNEP)	Gold	100,000^{*}
Germany (BVMI)	Gold	150,000^{^}
Japan (RIAJ)	Platinum	200,000^{^}
Netherlands (NVPI)	Gold	40,000^{^}
Spain (Promusicae)	Gold	50,000^{^}
Switzerland (IFPI Switzerland)	Platinum	40,000^{^}
United Kingdom (BPI)	Gold	100,000^{^}
United States (RIAA)	Platinum	1,020,000
^{*} Sales figures based on certification alone.^{^} Shipments figures based on certification alone.
