= Squatting in Croatia =

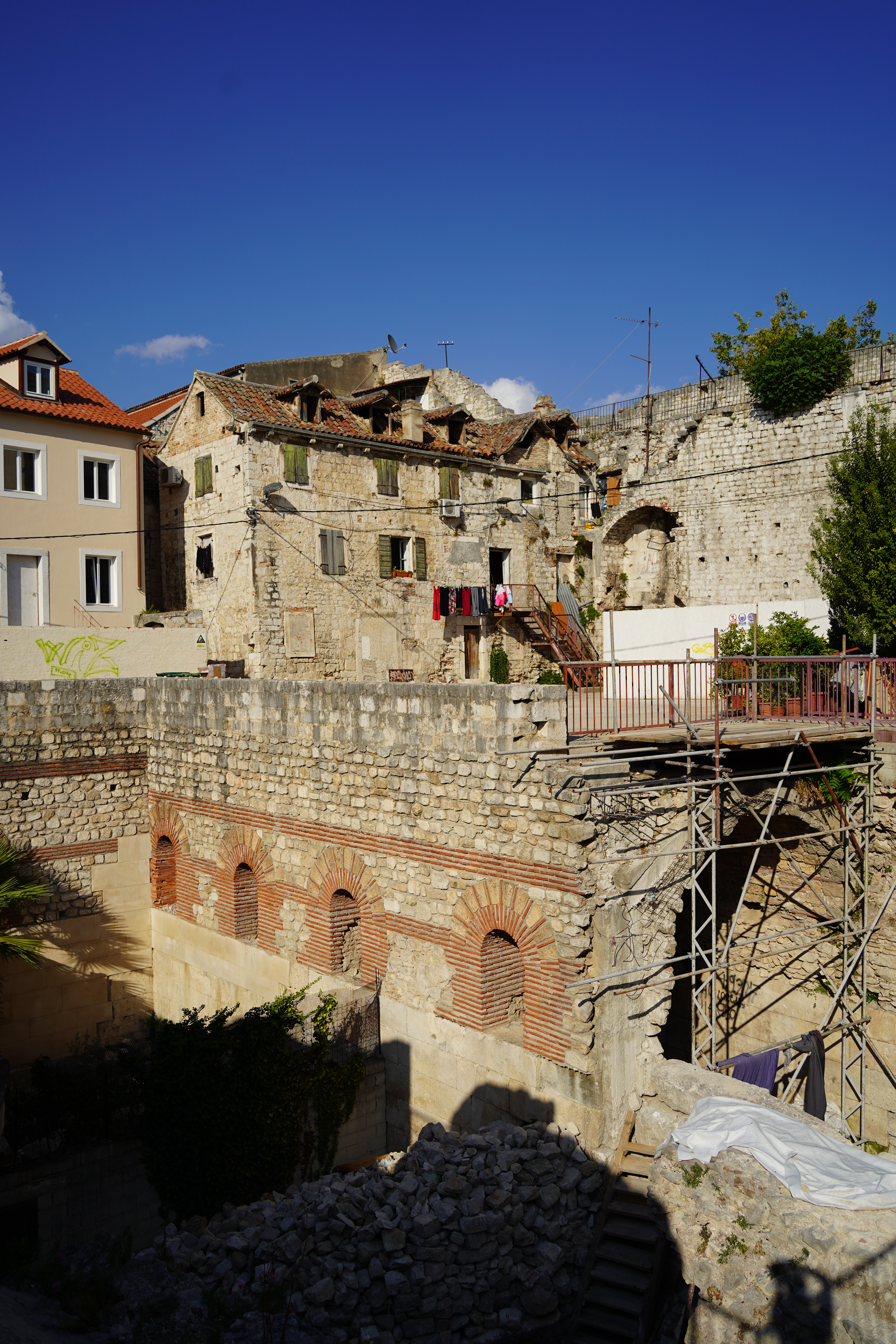
Housing in Diocletian's Palace

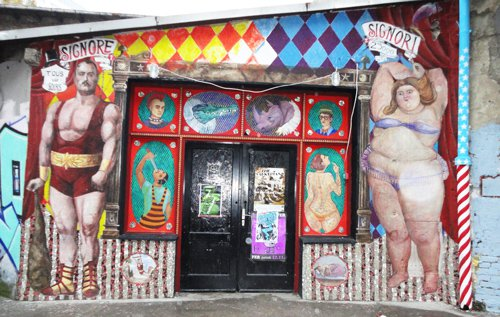
Entrance to Attack, venue at AKC Medika

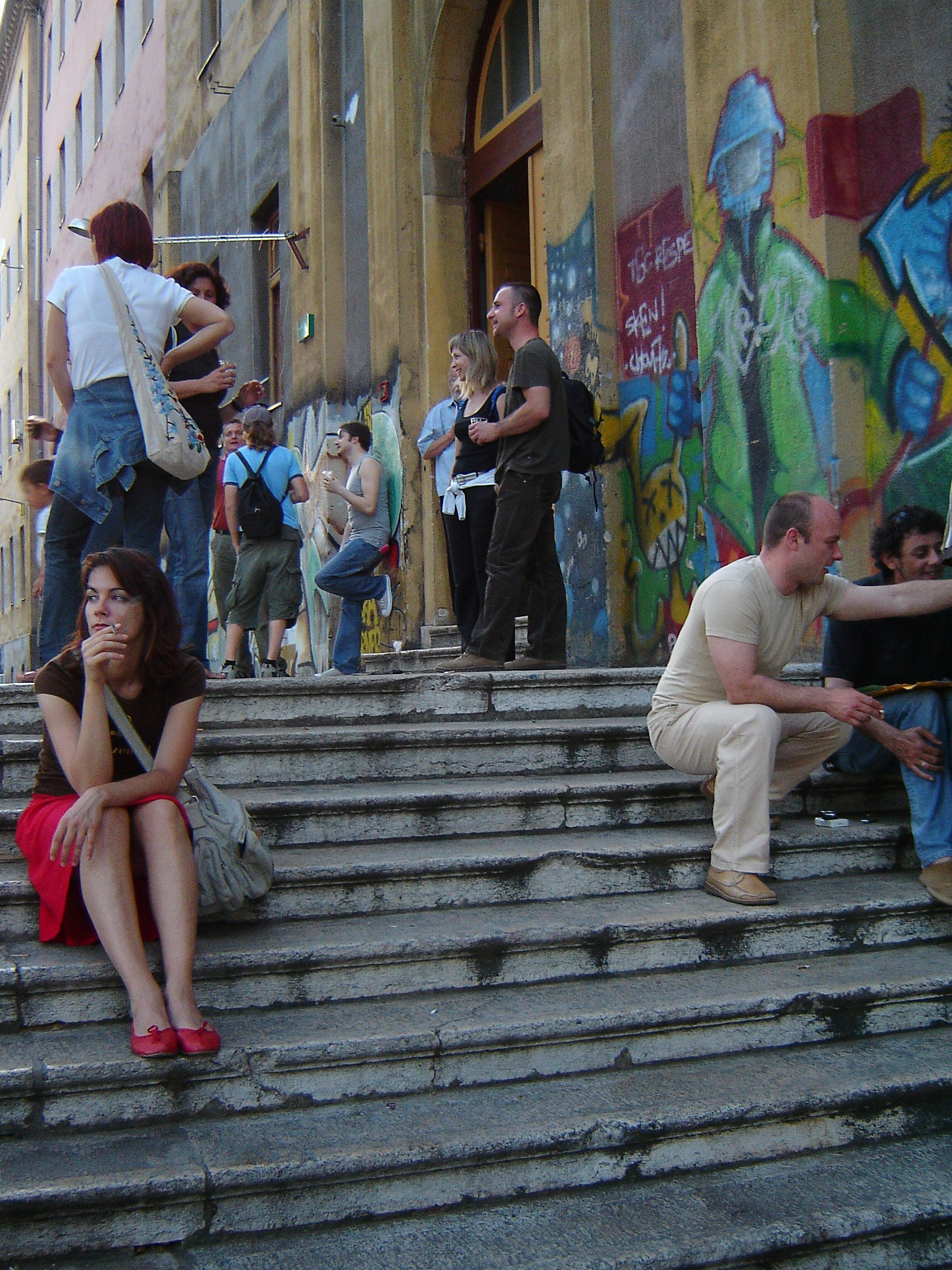
Social centre Karlo Rojc, 2005

Squatting in Croatia has existed as a phenomenon since the decline of the Roman Empire. In the 1960s much private housing in major cities was illegally constructed or expanded and since the 1990s squatting is used as a tactic by feminists, punks and anarchists. Well-known (and mostly legalized) self-managed social centres include the cultural centre Karlo Rojc in Pula, Nigdjezemska in Zadar and (AKC) Medika in Zagreb.

== History ==
At the end of the Roman Empire, when the city of Salona was sacked sometime in the seventh century, its inhabitants fled to Diocletian's Palace nearby beside the sea. They squatted in the compound and their descendants have lived there ever since, resisting attacks from Pannonian Avars, Goths, Slavs, Tartars and the Ottoman Empire. The city of Split grew up around the palace. During the Croatian War of Independence (1991-1995), the peace movement was composed of squatters as well as anarchists, environmentalists and feminists.

In the 1960s, 39.5 per cent of all private housing in Zagreb was squatted, 49.3 per cent in Split and 66.8 per cent in Osijek. Squatting is criminalized by Articles 20-27 of the Croatian Ownership and other Proprietary Rights Act, and has become a form of subcultural activism in cities such as Zagreb from the 1990s onwards.

In 1989, feminists organized through the Women's Group Tresnjevka squatted an apartment in Zagreb to shelter women escaping domestic violence.

== Social centres ==
AKC Medika in Zagreb is a social centre that has a bar, a music venue, galleries and office space for radical groups. The venue is called Attack and there is also a bicycle repair workshop, an infoshop and a film studio. There is also the illegal and mixed use squat known as Vila Kiseljak or Squat on Knežija.

The story of the ReciKlaonica squat started on 11 February 2011 and it continues. The informal collective of artists and social activists that develops its activities in the spaces of the old abandoned Zagrepčanka factory, owned by Zagrebački Holding.

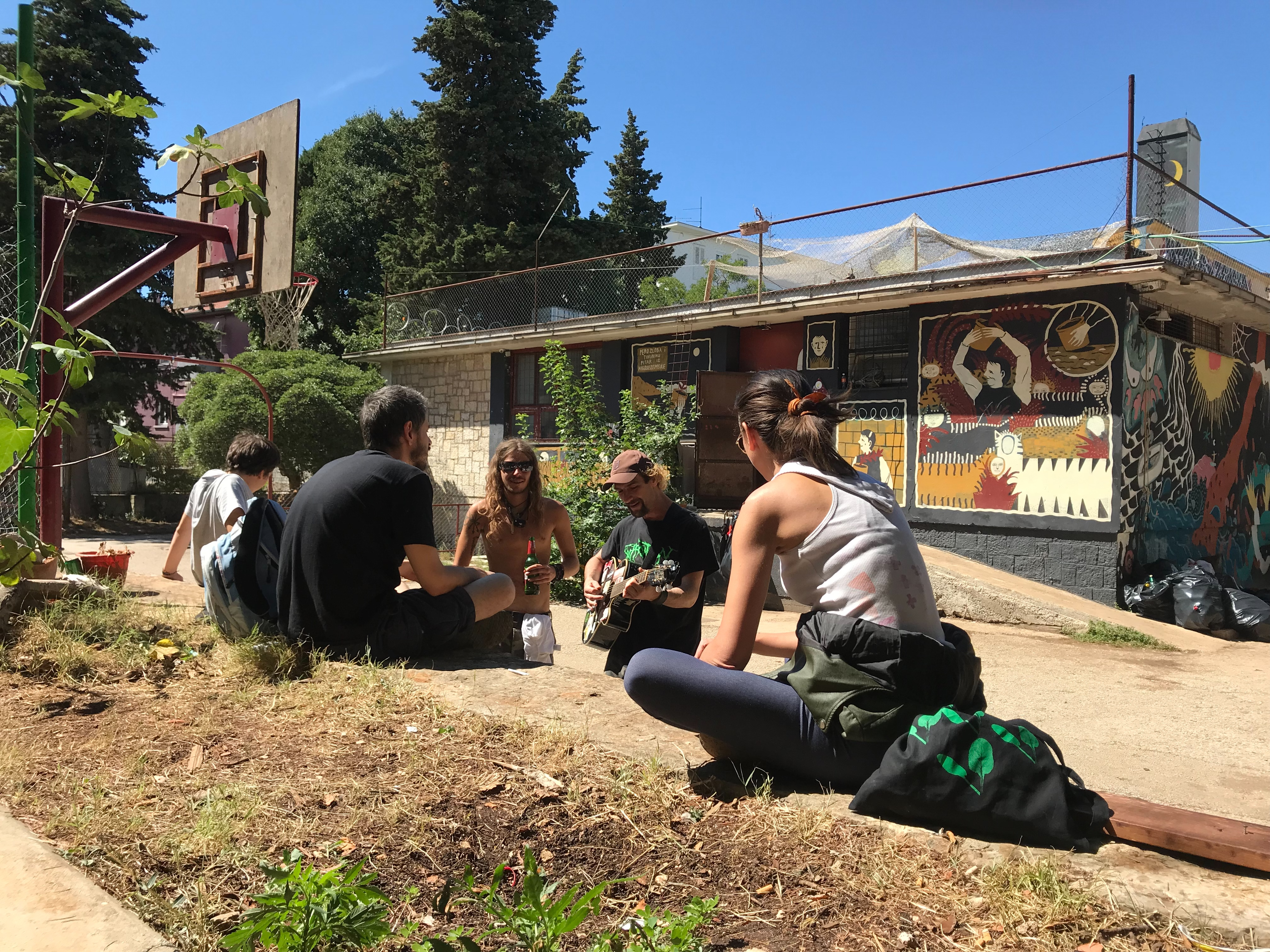
In front of Nigdjezemska, 2021

Nigdjezemska (Nowhereland) is a self-managed social centre in the part of the former military complex Stjepan Radić in Zadar. In 2019, the centre and the Menza skate park were threatened with eviction.

In Pula, the self-managed cultural centre Karlo Rojc is located in the former Military facilities Karlo Rojc. It was initially squatted by punks and then legalized. It provides rooms and ateliers for over 100 groups and has a hacklab and a music venue. Since 1999, Rojc has hosted the annual Monteparadiso punk music festival which began seven years earlier in the squatted Fort Casoni Vecchi.

== See also ==
- Squatting in Serbia
- Squatting in Slovenia
