= Precious Illusions =

2002 single by Alanis Morissette

Single by Alanis Morissette

from the album Under Rug Swept
- B-side: "Sorry 2 Myself"; "Offer"; "Bent 4 U"
- Released: May 20, 2002
- Length: 4:11 (album version); 3:50 (radio edit)
- Label: Maverick; Reprise
- Songwriter: Alanis Morissette
- Producer: Alanis Morissette

Alanis Morissette singles chronology
"Hands Clean" (2002)	"Precious Illusions" (2002)	"Flinch" (2002)

Music video
- "Precious Illusions" on YouTube

"Precious Illusions" is a song written, performed, and produced by Canadian singer Alanis Morissette for her fifth studio album, Under Rug Swept (2002). It released as the album's second and final international single on May 20, 2002. Its lyrics describe a conflict between idealism and realism, and its protagonist refers to her childhood fancies as "precious illusions" that she has distanced herself from with a feeling that reminds her of "parting with an imaginary friend".

"Precious Illusions" did not receive as much radio airplay in the United States as "Hands Clean", the first single from Under Rug Swept. It peaked within the top 20 on Billboard's Adult Top 40 chart but garnered little Top 40 radio play compared to "Hands Clean" and failed to chart on the US Billboard Hot 100. However, it reached number four in Canada and peaked within the top 10 in Hungary. The music video for the song is presented in split screen, offering a side-by-side comparison of the mythic and the real versions of a romantic relationship.

== Recording and release ==
"Precious Illusions" was all written, arranged and produced by Alanis Morissette. According to herself, "I went to Toronto to write and I didn't know whether I'd be writing songs for the record alone or with someone. I had no idea, but I started writing alone, and within the first week I'd written seven songs. So it was all really fast and accelerated [...] I'd have my little space station worked out where it was like a keyboard, an acoustic, an electric, my journal and a microphone set up, and we'd record it all onto DAT." After the success of previous single, "Hands Clean", "Precious Illusions" was announced as Under Rug Swept's second single after news that she was shooting its music video. "Precious Illusions" was first released in Australia on May 20, 2002. In the United Kingdom, two CD singles and a cassette single were issued on August 5, 2002.

== Composition and lyrics ==
"Precious Illusions" was written in the key of E major, with a moderate tempo of 92 beats per minute. Morissette's vocal range span from the low note of B4 to the high-note of C6. The song is "dressed up in toe-tapping rhythms, crunchy guitars and downright infectious melodies," as noted by Sal Cinquemani, editor of Slant Magazine. Larry Flick of Billboard Magazine added that the song has a "radio-ready arrangement rife with insinuating shuffle beats, U2-esque guitar licks, and a sticky, candy-sweet hook." The song "examines the pitfalls of relationships. In an interview for Yahoo! Music, Morissette said of "Precious Illusions": "As I evolve and as I grow older, a lot of the things I thought to be truths when I was younger just really aren't, and that's disillusioning. And there is a grief and a loss of sorts that happens when I segue from one awareness to another. And that's what I was singing about on that song."

Its lyrics describe a conflict between idealism and realism, and its protagonist refers to her childhood fancies as "precious illusions" that she has distanced herself from with a feeling that reminds her of "parting with an imaginary friend". Nonetheless, she demonstrates that she has retained a rose-tinted sense of romantic optimism into adulthood, when she expresses a yearning hope for marriage ("this ring") and a husband ("you knight in shining armor"). Flick of Billboard also noted that "there's a pointed edge of cynicism in such lines as "You'll complete me, right?/And my life can finally begin'." He also noted that Morissette "turn that cynicism into a catalyst for letting go of the notion of perfect romance and growing toward positive declarations like 'I won't keep playing the victim."

In a track-by-track commentary about Under Rug Swept, Morissette further commented about the track:

"There's a lyric in the middle of the song that says, 'I want to decide between survival and bliss.' Basically I'm talking about the difference between really being alive and really embracing the reason why I'm here on this earth versus my just being asleep and sleep walking and accepting the status quo and accepting somewhat of a suffering mentality to being here. It really is my responsibility to distinguish the difference between the two and choose which one I want. It's so easy for me to want to not take responsibility for my life and relinquish it and look outside of myself for the answers that I know very well are within me. It's so scary to be silent and it's so scary to go within, until I do it. And once I'm doing it, I just wonder why I wasn't doing this all the time. So that decision to be fully alive is one that is preceded by some pretty intense decisions and some choices and responsibility-taking that at times can be very intimidating, again, before I do it."

== Reception ==
=== Critical ===
Larry Flick of Billboard praised the song for "exemplif[ying] how the artist has actually matured significantly," also calling it a "sane self-empowerment". Flick also noted that Morissette "sells the song with a performance that is, by turns, introspective and chest-pounding." Sal Cinquemani of Slant Magazine praised the track for being "super-catchy," while Chris Heath of Dotmusic lauded the track for "confirm[ing] that, as a songwriter, Alanis is only getting better."

=== Commercial ===
"Precious Illusions" became a success in Canada, where it peaked at number four, and Hungary, reaching number nine. In Australia, the song debuted and peaked at number 41, on June 2, 2002. Although only reaching number 79 in Netherlands, the song managed to spend six weeks inside the charts. In the United Kingdom, "Precious Illusions" only reached number 59, becoming her second-lowest-charting single at the time. In the United States, the song failed to enter the Billboard Hot 100 chart but reached number 16 on the Adult Pop Songs chart.

== Music video ==
The single's music video was directed by Francis Lawrence, who helmed the "Hands Clean" video. It was filmed in late May 2002 and uses a split-screen effect. In the video for "Precious Illusions," Alanis Morissette is courted by a handsome prince (played by American actor Lucas Babin) who gives her a diamond and invites her to live happily ever after. However, while the left side of the screen follows the fairy-tale romance, the right side shows more a realistic view: in place of the prince, her suitor is a guy who asks her out by e-mail. As noted by Elysa Lee of CNN, "he does propose, but in a way that reminds us that love isn't all blossoms and butterflies." According to Morissette, "The right side is more me. I'm not anywhere near being in a position to ask or be asked, so it was charming and amusing."

== Track listings ==
Canadian CD single

1. "Precious Illusions"
2. "Hands Clean" (acoustic version)

UK and European CD1

1. "Precious Illusions"
2. "Hands Clean" (acoustic version)
3. "Sorry 2 Myself"

UK and European CD2

1. "Precious Illusions"
2. "Offer"
3. "Bent 4 U"

European maxi-CD single

1. "Precious Illusions" – 4:12
2. "Hands Clean" (acoustic version) – 4:07
3. "Offer" – 4:05
4. "Bent 4 U" – 4:46

== Charts ==
=== Weekly charts ===
Weekly chart performance for "Precious Illusions"
Chart (2002)	Peak position
Australia (ARIA)	41
Canada (Nielsen SoundScan)	4
Canada CHR (Nielsen BDS)	7
Germany (GfK)	77
Hungary (Single Top 40)	9
Italy (FIMI)	21
Netherlands (Dutch Tipparade 40)	8
Netherlands (Single Top 100)	79
Scotland Singles (Official Charts)	56
Switzerland (Schweizer Hitparade)	95
UK Singles (Official Charts)	53
US Adult Pop Airplay (Billboard)	16
US CHR/Pop Indicator (Radio & Records)	48
US Hot AC (Radio & Records)	17
US Triple A (Radio & Records)	19

=== Year-end charts ===
Year-end chart performance for "Precious Illusions"
Chart (2002)	Position
Canada (Nielsen SoundScan)	88
Canada Radio (Nielsen BDS)	46
US Adult Top 40 (Billboard)	58
US Hot AC (Radio & Records)	63

== Release history ==
Release dates and formats for "Precious Illusions"
Region	Date	Format(s)	Label(s)	Ref.
Australia	May 20, 2002	CD	Maverick; Reprise	
United States	May 28, 2002	Hot adult contemporary radio; triple A radio	Maverick; Reprise	
United States	June 3, 2002	Contemporary hit radio	Maverick; Reprise	
United Kingdom	August 5, 2002	CD; cassette	Maverick	
