= 21 Things I Want in a Lover =

Promotional single by Alanis Morissette

from the album Under Rug Swept
- Released: November 2002
- Studio: Great Big Music (Toronto, ON)
- Genre: Alternative rock; hard rock
- Length: 3:28
- Label: Maverick
- Songwriter: Alanis Morissette
- Producer: Alanis Morissette

Alanis Morissette singles chronology
"Flinch" (2002)	"21 Things I Want in a Lover" (2002)	"So Unsexy" (2003)

"21 Things I Want in a Lover" (sometimes referred as just "21 Things") is a song recorded by Canadian singer-songwriter Alanis Morissette for her fifth studio album, Under Rug Swept (2002). "21 Things I Want in a Lover" was all written, arranged and produced by Morissette. It is an alternative rock song, featuring guitarist Dean DeLeo of Stone Temple Pilots. Lyrically, the song talks about all the 21 qualities that Morissette would like the most to find in a lover.

"21 Things" received mixed reviews from critics, with many praising it as a standout track on the album, but others found issues with the song's lyrics. The song was only released as a single in Brazil, charting on the Hot 100 chart, peaking inside the top fifty. A video for the song was also released there, featuring clips from the DVD Feast on Scraps and live shows. Morissette performed the track during the Toward Our Union Mended Tour (2002), So-Called Chaos Tour (2004) and the Guardian Angel Tour (2012).

== Background and recording ==
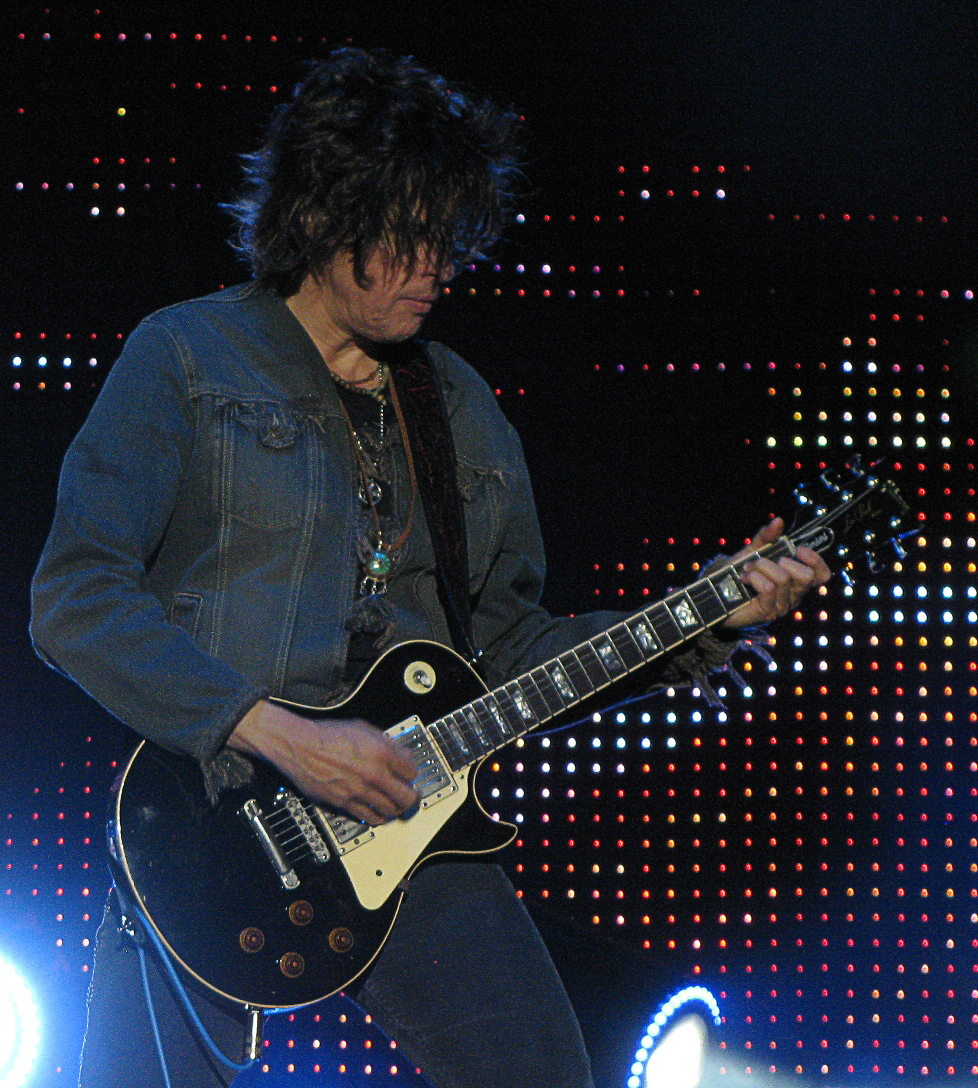
Dean DeLeo plays guitar on the track.

"21 Things I Want in a Lover" was all written, arranged and produced by Alanis Morissette, in the same vein of the entire album, Under Rug Swept. The song was mixed by Chris Fogel and features Dean DeLeo, guitarist of the Stone Temple Pilots, on the guitar. While writing the track, Morissette claimed that she's joking in one part of the song, but in another she's "dead serious." According to Morissette, "I went to Toronto to write and I didn't know whether I'd be writing songs for the record alone or with someone. I had no idea, but I started writing alone, and within the first week I'd written seven songs. So it was all really fast and accelerated [...] I'd have my little space station worked out where it was like a keyboard, an acoustic, an electric, my journal and a microphone set up, and we'd record it all onto DAT."

== Composition and lyrics ==
According to the sheet music published at Musicnotes.com by Universal Music Publishing Group, "21 Things I Want In a Lover" was written in the key of C major, with a moderately tempo of 96 beats per minute. The introduction follows the chord progression of C5–C(♭5)–F5/C-C. Morissette's vocal range span from the low-note of G4 to the high-note of C6. The Alternative rock song starts with a "toothy" guitar hook, played by Dean DeLeo, followed by Morissette listing the 21 things she wants in a lover, "not necessarily needs but qualities that [she] prefer[s]." Sal Cinquemani of Slant Magazine noted that the song "is structured in Morissette's distinct listy lyrical fashion," citing the line "Do you have a big intellectual capacity but know that it does not equate wisdom?" as an example. For Nikki Tranter of PopMatters, the song "details exactly what Alanis is looking for in her perfect guy. According to the song, this guy would be eloquent and intelligent, sexually experimental and politically aware, self-deprecating and adventurous, athletic and free of addictions." Ethan Browne of Metro New York called the list of requirements for a boyfriend, "dopey [...] with its unintentionally hilarious qualifier."

In an interview for Spin, Morissette commented that she had 673 things that she wanted in a lover, claiming that it needed "to be updated after every guy." She also claimed, "I want someone who can be a complete dork with me and have no shame and be really disgusting. [...] So I can go, 'Oh, spirituality is very important to me, and this person, no matter how much I want to fuck him right now, does not believe in God.' That list has saved my ass on a few occasions." She further explained the song on a track-by-track commentary on the album:

"The more aware of the qualities I am looking for, the more I'm able to recognize them when they appear, as opposed to having the initial meeting romantically be singularly dependent on chemical reaction or some intangible, indefinable, heart-palpitating, palm- sweating thing. Because the palm sweating, heart palpitating beginnings of a relationship often result in a huge amount of incompatibility, so the concept of compatibility is so much more important to me as I get older."

== Critical reception ==
"21 Things I Want In a Lover" received generally mixed reviews from music critics. Stephen Thomas Erlewine of Allmusic chose the track as one of the highlights on Under Rug Swept, while Michael Paoletta of Billboard picked the song as a "winning moment" on the album. Robert Christgau praised the singer for "instantly demonstrat[ing] her gift for the catchy, crunching out a guitar riff," also noting that one of the things she wants in a man, such as "opposing capital punishment" and "coming out for sex 'more than three times a week" are "topping memorable verse with indelible chorus." Jon Pareles of Rolling Stone characterised it as a "power-chorded personal ad". Miles Marshall Lewis of L.A. Weekly was positive, calling it "a wholly satisfying pop-rocker," [which] launches the album with her laundry-list lyric style."

Jim DeRogatis of Salon.com was mixed, claiming that the singer "has a way of ruining her best tunes with Doh!-worthy lyrics", citing "21 Things" as an example. Mark Blake of Q noted the song contains "a trampoline-bouncing guitar riff to detract attention from lyrics packed tighter than a holiday suitcase." Kimberly Reyes of Time panned its lyrics, claiming that they "could easily double as boy trouble letters sent to Seventeen [magazine]." Rob Mitchum of Pitchfork Media wrote that the lyrics about what she's looking for in a man is "a move that could come off as self-indulgent, but in a personality as luminescent as Ms. Morissette, is nothing short of entrancing." Jennifer Vineyard of MTV News called it a "textured Jagged [Little Pill]-esque tune," but noted that its lyrics contain "stream-of-consciousness."

== Release and commercial performance ==
"21 Things I Want in a Lover" was released to radio and television as the third single from Under Rug Swept in Brazil. The music video for the single comprises clips from the DVD release Feast on Scraps; some of these are from a performance of the song at Ahoy in Rotterdam, Netherlands on August 13, 2002, during Morissette's Toward Our Union Mended Tour. The video premiered on Channel [V] International in Malaysia on November 2, and on MTV Brasil on November 20. The singer also performed the song on the Jay Leno Show, as well as on the So-Called Chaos Tour (2004) and the Guardian Angel Tour (2012). The song debuted on the Brazil's Hot 100 chart on 16 November 2002, before peaking at number 48 on 30 November 2002.

== Charts ==
Chart (2002)	Peak position
Brazil (Hot 100 Brasil)	48
