= List of Peace Maker chapters =

English version of Peace Maker volume 1, published by Tokyopop on September 10, 2005

The chapters of Peace Maker and Peacemaker Kurogane are written and illustrated by Nanae Chrono. Peace Maker was published in Japan by Enix before it was transferred to Mag Garden. It was licensed and published in North America and Germany by Tokyopop. The manga was also licensed and published in Italy by Star Comics.

Peacemaker Kurogane itself was started as a new series in Mag Garden's Monthly Comic Blade in 2001. It was later licensed by ADV Manga, which released three of the five volumes before putting it on hold indefinitely. After the license lapsed, Tokyopop acquired it, releasing four volumes. The manga was licensed and published in France by Kami, in Germany by Tokyopop and in Russia by Comics Factory.

== Volume list ==
=== Peace Maker ===
==== Enix edition ====
No.	Japanese release date	Japanese ISBN
1	September 1999	4-7575-0094-7
2	March 2000	4-7575-0197-8
3	September 2000	4-7575-0312-1
4	March 2001	4-7575-0420-9
5	August 2001	4-7575-0513-2
6	September 2001	4-7575-0550-7

==== Mag Garden edition ====
No.	Original release date	Original ISBN	English release date	English ISBN
1	September 10, 2005	978-4-86127-187-8	August 14, 2007	978-1-427-80075-6
01. "I Will" (私は, "Watashi Ha"); 02. "Things We Said Today" (言ったことを私たちは今日, "Itta Koto o Watashitachi Wa Kyō"); 03. "This Boy" (このボーイ, "Kono Bōi"); 04. "How Do You Do It" (どのようにかか, "Dono You Ni Kaka"); 05. "Act Naturally" (当然のことながら法, "Tōzen no Koto Nagara Hō")
2	September 10, 2005	978-4-86127-188-5	December 4, 2007	978-1-427-80076-3
06. "Revolution" (革命, "Kakumei"); 07. "I'm a Loser" (私は敗者だ, "Watashi Ha Haishada"); 08. "Get Back" (先頭を取得, "Sentō o Shutoku"); 09. "All I've Got to Do" (すべて私が持っているか, "Subete Watashi Ga Motte Iru Ka"); 10. "Some Other Way" (いくつかの他の方法, "Ikutsu Ka No Hoka No Hōhō"); 11. "Ask Me Why" (私はなぜ質問, "Watashi Wa Naze Shitsumon")
3	September 10, 2005	978-4-86127-189-2	April 8, 2008	978-1-427-80077-0
12. "Nowhere Man" (どこにも男, "Doko Ni Mo Otoko"); 13. "I Call Your Name" (私はあなたのお名前請求, "Watashi Wa Anata No Onamae Seikyū"); 14. "Something?" (何か, "Nani Ka"); 15. "Chains" (チェーン, "Cheen"); 16. "Don't Let Me Down" (ミーダウンさせてはいけない, "Mīdaun Sasete Wa Ikenai"); 17. "I'm Looking Through You" (私はあなたを探しています, "Watashi Ha Anata o Sagashiteimasu")
4	September 10, 2005	978-4-86127-190-8	August 12, 2008	978-1-427-80078-7
18. "From Me to You" (私からあなたへ, "Watashi Kara Anata He"); 19. "You Know My Name" (あなたが私の名を知っている, "Anata Ga Watashi no Na o Shitte Iru"); 20. "I'll Be on My Way" (私は私の行くが, "Watashi Ha Watashi no Iku Ga"); 21. "Junk" (ジャンク, "Janku"); 22. "Misery" (不幸, "Fukō"); 23. "Come Together" (一緒に、是非, "Issho Ni, Zehi")
5	September 10, 2005	978-4-86127-191-5	November 4, 2008	978-1-427-80079-4
24. "A Hard Day's Night (Scene 1)" (アハードデイズナイト（シーン1 ）, "A Hādo Deizu Naito (Shīn 1)"); 25. "A Hard Day's Night (Scene 2)" (アハードデイズナイト（シーン2 ）, "A Hādo Deizu Naito (Shīn 2)"); 26. "A Hard Day's Night (Scene 3)" (アハードデイズナイト（シーン3 ）, "A Hādo Deizu Naito (Shīn 3)"); 27. "A Hard Day's Night (Scene 4)" (アハードデイズナイト（シーン4 ）, "A Hādo Deizu Naito (Shīn 4)"); 28. "A Hard Day's Night (Final Scene)" (アハードデイズナイト（最後の場面）, "A Hādo Deizu Naito (Saigo no Bamen)"); 29. "A Day in the Life" (私たちの一日, "Watashitachi No Ichi Nichi")

=== Peacemaker Kurogane ===
No.	Original release date	Original ISBN	English release date	English ISBN
1	October 10, 2002	978-4-901926-11-9	October 4, 2004	978-1-4139-0161-0
2	February 10, 2003	978-4-901926-30-0	December 14, 2004	978-1-4139-0192-4
3	July 10, 2003	978-4-901926-72-0	March 22, 2005	978-1-4139-0197-9
4	February 10, 2004	978-4-86127-013-0	June 1, 2010	978-1-4278-1419-7
5	March 10, 2005	978-4-86127-125-0	—	—
6	November 1, 2010	978-4-86127-787-0	—	—
7	May 14, 2014	978-4-8000-0309-6	—	—
8	April 14, 2015	978-4-8000-0444-4	—	—
9	October 14, 2015	978-4-8000-0506-9	—	—
10	April 14, 2016	978-4-8000-0557-1	—	—
11	September 14, 2016	978-4-8000-0616-5	—	—
12	April 14, 2017	978-4-8000-0676-9	—	—
13	October 13, 2017	978-4-8000-0725-4	—	—
14	April 13, 2018	978-4-8000-0761-2	—	—
15	October 10, 2018	978-4-8000-0802-2	—	—
16	May 31, 2019	978-4-8000-0864-0	—	—
17	May 29, 2020	978-4-8000-0980-7	—	—
