= Grupo Yaramá =

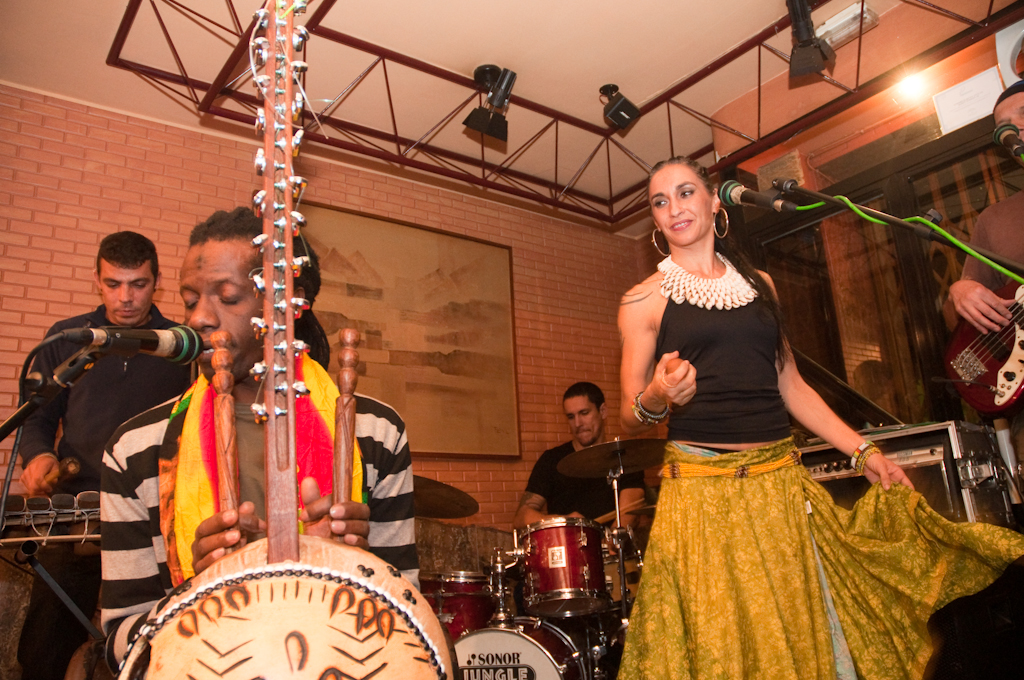
- Grupo Yaramá performing on 21 November 2009
- Website: www.yarama.com/index.php

Grupo Yaramá is a group of musicians who base their work on the musical traditions of Senegal, Mali and Guinea in West Africa. They are often accompanied by dancers. Their work has been recorded in the documentary film On-Yaramá (2008), presented at the African Film Festival of Tarifa.

"Yaramá" means "with an open heart" in the Mandingo language. The group's work reflects several West African cultures and musical traditions. The group uses traditional instruments: Kora, Djembes, Dununs, balafon, Yabará, Bells etc. to create a unique and powerful sound. Dance is inextricably combined with the rhythm in their performances. The group has run workshops on dance and percussion, for example at the African Film Festival of Tarifa and the Festival Eutopía09. The dance style includes a wider range of movements than other types of dance, dissociating the movements of the different parts of the body.

Members of the group include Ivan Sanjuan, who trained as a percussionist in Senegal (Ballet D'afrique Tam tam), Guinea (Koungbanan Conde) and Cuba. Ibrahima Diabete, born in Senegal, was trained at the conservatory in Dakar. Jacinthe Zinzou is a renowned and versatile Senegalese versatile dancer trained in various disciplines such as African ritual dance, fire, stilts and limbo. Sirifo Kouyate from Kolda and Fidel Marquez specializing in African, Cuban and Brazilian drumming. The group is often accompanied by dancers led by Cristina Rosa, director of the Badajoz School of African Dance.
