= Squatting in Serbia =

Occupation of unused land or derelict buildings in Serbia without permission of owner

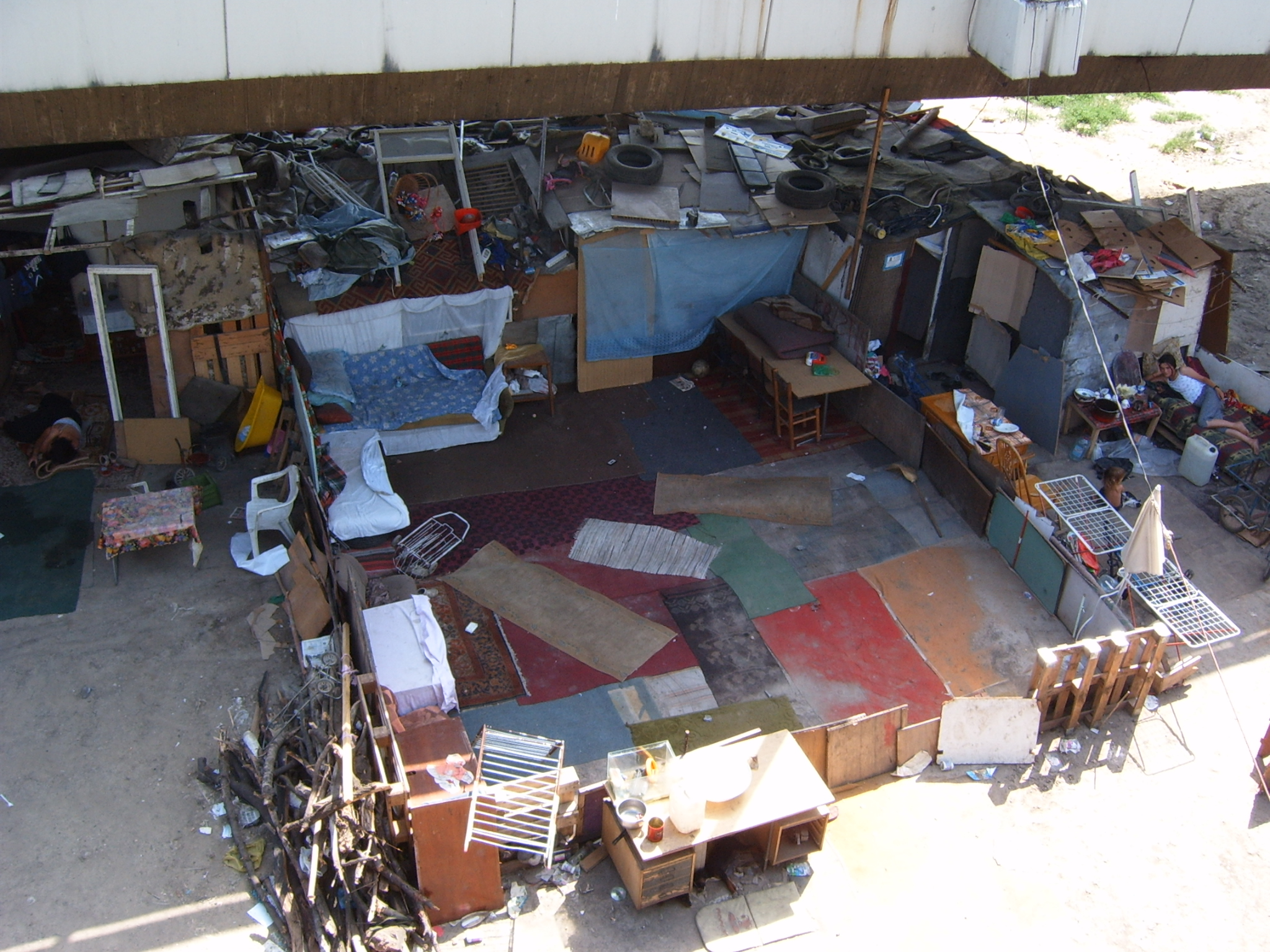
Living quarters in Cardboard city in 2007

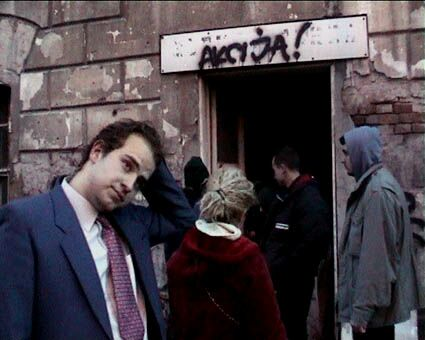
Entrance to Akcija squat in 2006

Squatting in Serbia refers to the unauthorised occupation of land or buildings. Following World War I, shanty towns emerged in the mostly demolished capital Belgrade, the most notable example being Jatagan Mala. The population of Belgrade rose from 593,000 in 1953 to 1,470,000 in 1981. Between 1961 and 1971, 52% of all private construction of houses in Belgrade was illegal. The percentage was also high in other cities such as Novi Sad and Smederevo. The reasons for squatting and illegal construction were the lack of affordable housing, bad governance and the bureaucracy involved in legalising land clams. Also the punishments were light.

Squatting has come to refer to either Romani people occupying buildings or shacks built as second homes in suburban areas. A large Romani settlement called Cardboard city (Serbian: Картон сити, Karton siti) was evicted in 2009. In Belgrade there have also been explicitly political self-managed social centres such as Rebel House, AKC Akcija and KUDRUC. In 2014, the derelict Zvezda cinema was occupied by activists and reopened.

The Belgrade authorities announced in 2017 that all migrants squatting in the city centre would be moved to official centres. A former military barracks housing around 1,200 refugees mainly from Afghanistan and Pakistan was then evicted to clear the ground for the Belgrade Waterfront project. In 2019, UNHCR estimated there were 650 migrant squatters in Belgrade and near to the border with Croatia and Hungary.
