= Nowhere (event) =

Burning Man event in Spain

Coordinates: 41°38′N 0°11′W

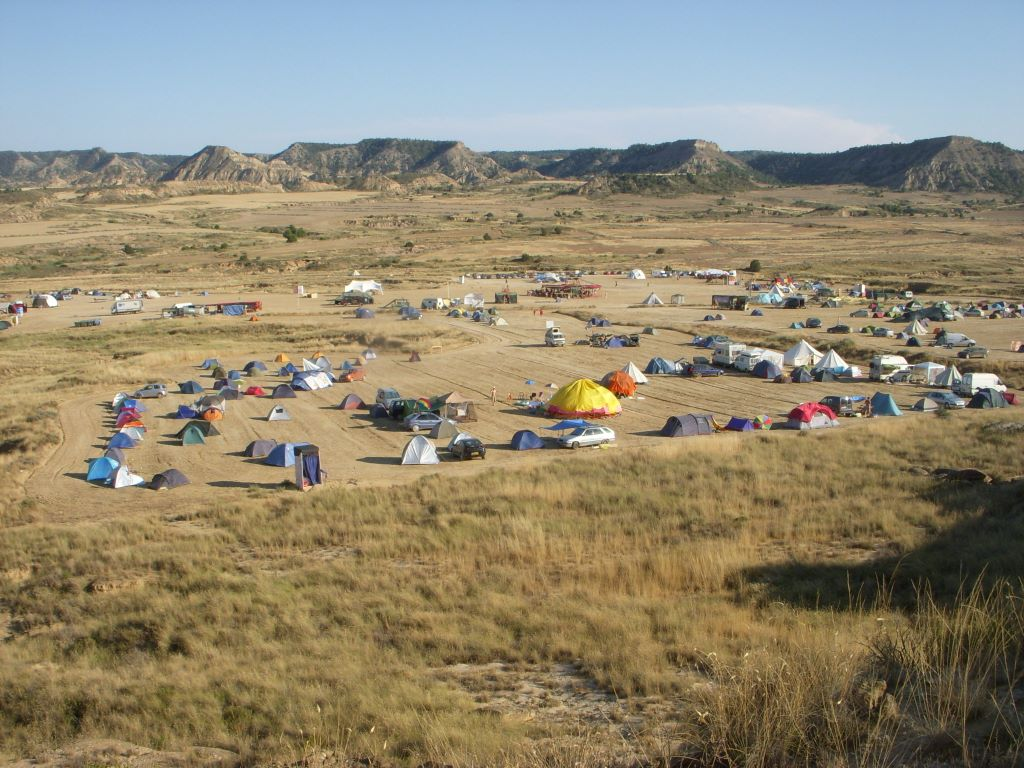
- Nowhere 2009 festival site

A regional burn event in Europe
- Location: Monegros Desert, Monegros, Aragon, Spain
- Type of event: Arts, Music, Costumes, Participation. Inspired by the Burning Man Festival.
- Participants: 2670
- Most recent event: 1-6 July 2025
- First year: 2004
- Website: www.goingnowhere.org

Nowhere (Spanish: Ninguna parte) is a Burning Man regional event in Spain, the biggest such regional event in Europe. It began in 2004 and is held annually in July in the Monegros Desert, located in Aragon in north-eastern Spain.

As an officially-sanctioned regional event, Nowhere embraces the Burning Man principles. The number of participants has declined every year since 2019 (except 2020 and 2021 that were cancelled due to Covid-19). In 2023 the number of participants was 2670. It was decided in 2026 to no longer produce the Nowhere event. A group called The Nobodies has started a similar event in Spain called Elsewhere.

== History ==
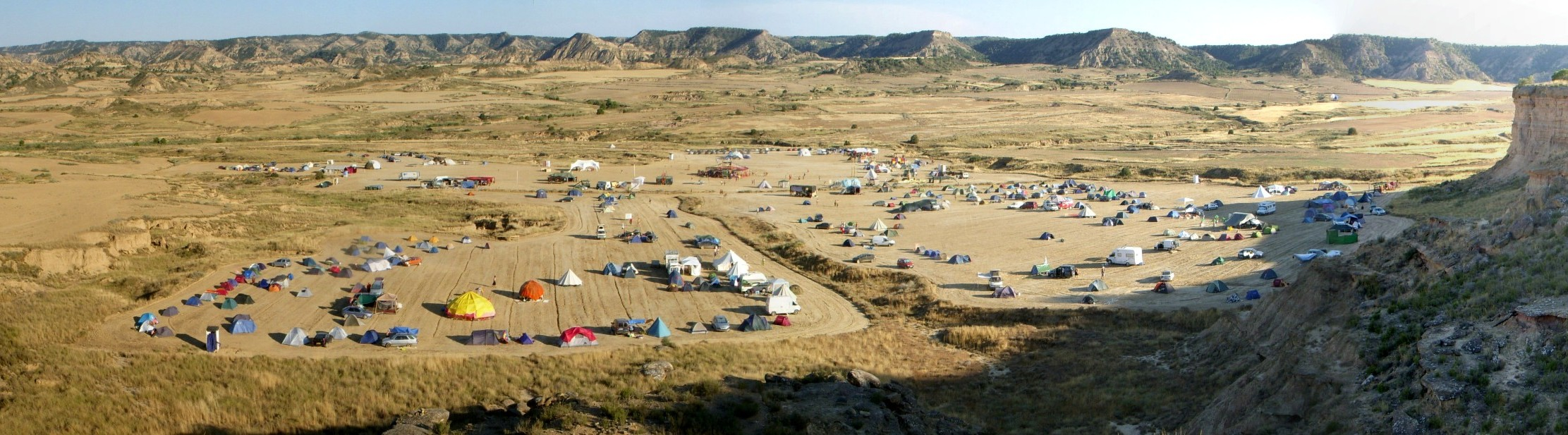
Nowhere in 2009

The roots of Nowhere date back to 2002 when UK burners started to organize a decompression party in London. Nowhere has been held in several different locations in the Navarra and Aragon regions of Spain. It began in 2004, in Bardenas Reales. The current location is near Sariñena in the Province of Huesca. In 2016, attendance was about 1000 people; in 2017, about 1000 or 1500 people; and in 2018 and 2019 around 3600 participants. Nowhere was cancelled in 2020 and 2021. The 2023 event sold 2980 tickets.

== Features ==
Nowhere, like any Burning Man event, differs drastically from a music festival. Participation is the key element of the event and every attendant is expected to be involved in some way. Every task ranging from setup over maintaining the gate and perimeter up to first aid are volunteer based. There is no hired workforce aside from transport and logistics. Further, there are no scheduled performers or stages. Participants pay everything they contribute out of their own pocket as there is a strict rule of non commerce.

Being situated in the region of Monegros near Zaragoza, Nowhere is characterized by its dry, desert climate. Because it is Europe's second largest burn event after The Borderland in Sweden, Nowhere has historically drawn a nationally diverse crowd.

=== Barrios ===
A Barrio is a group of people who camp together, share infrastructure (kitchen, shade structure, etc.), and usually provide a service or attraction to the other participants. Barrios must register for the event and be assigned a location based on their size and sound zone preferences.

Barrios are a vital part of Nowhere and in 2018 the event hosted about 50 Barrios ranging from large sound camps to meditation camps. There are special Barrios like Werkhaus, which house core event volunteers.

=== Freecampers ===
Aside from the Barrios, there are many free camps for independent campers who are not affiliated with a Barrio where the majority of participants stay. They are referred to as Freecampers. In these areas, some Freecampers create their own shade structures and artwork. Others set up public areas within free camping areas. Middle of Frickin Freecamp is one of the most well-known (MOFF). MOFF, which has become a Nowhere institution, allows for gatherings and workshops.

=== No open fires ===
Nowhere does not include fire as a key feature of the event. Due to the dry area, which is on wildfire alert during the summer, it is strictly forbidden to have any kind open fire, therefore no art is set on fire. Fire spinning is restricted to a controlled area with fire marshals on duty. The burning of an effigy happened only once in 2016 after coming to an agreement with the local authorities.

=== Layout ===
Nowhere is created solely by the participants and driven by theme camps which are called Barrios. During the last incarnations Nowhere used a layout that resembled a compass. This leads to an arrangement of the Barrios in a circle-like shape. Nowhere further divides the camps into four distinct sound zones reading from the blue zone which has a no sound policy to the red zone which hosts the dance camps. The same goes for the free camping areas.

=== Art ===
Art is the core of any burn event and Nowhere does not differ from this. Despite this, large scale artworks are rare at Nowhere. This is in part due to the strict non burning policy. The logistics of transport, setup, takedown and removal are more challenging to the participants because of this. Nowhere gives art grants for artists up to €3000. Artworks that are meant to be built on the playa require prior registration.

=== Public infrastructure ===
The event has a central shade structure known as Middle of Nowhere (MoN). It is a public space for relaxing, dancing, workshops and socializing. Other public infrastructure includes: NoInfo which serves as the general point of information, La Cantina which offers volunteers a free meal and Werkhaus, which sets up and keeps the public infrastructure intact.
