= Flinch (song) =

Promotional single by Alanis Morissette

from the album Under Rug Swept
- Released: May 2002
- Studio: Royaltone Studios (Los Angeles, CA)
- Length: 6:03
- Label: Maverick
- Songwriter: Alanis Morissette
- Producer: Alanis Morissette

Alanis Morissette singles chronology
"Precious Illusions" (2002)	"Flinch" (2002)	"21 Things I Want in a Lover" (2002)

"Flinch" is a song recorded by Canadian singer-songwriter Alanis Morissette for her fifth studio album, Under Rug Swept (2002). The song, written, arranged and produced by Morissette herself, is inspired by an old flame she previously dated when she was younger. Lyrically, "Flinch" is about feeling ashamed and embarrassed after seeing a former boyfriend, and how much he still affects her, with the protagonist claiming that she will eventually grow up and will not even flinch at his name.

The song was released in Brazil as the album's third single, after being featured in the soundtrack of the Brazilian soap opera Desejos de Mulher in 2002. Critics were favorable with the song, with some praising its lyrics and Morissette's vocal performance as well as its story. The song charted on Brazil's Hot 100 chart, reaching the top-forty. Morissette has performed the song live numerous times, including on her "Toward Our Union Mended Tour" (2002) and her Live at Montreux 2012 CD/DVD.

== Background and writing ==
"Flinch" was all written, arranged and produced by Alanis Morissette in the writing sessions for her then-new album around 2000–2001. According to herself, "I went to Toronto to write and I didn't know whether I'd be writing songs for the record alone or with someone. I had no idea, but I started writing alone, and within the first week I'd written seven songs. So it was all really fast and accelerated [...] I'd have my little space station worked out where it was like a keyboard, an acoustic, an electric, my journal and a microphone set up, and we'd record it all onto DAT." "Flinch" was written in the key of A major, with a moderately slow tempo of 72 beats per minute. Morissette's vocal range span from the low-note of A4 to the high-note of B5.

Morissette said she wrote "Flinch" immediately after an experience she had in Canada during which she nearly ran into the subject of the song, only eluding them by driving away. According to her, she was surprised that in spite of years after their last meeting (which was when she was "very, very young"), she was "responding to the situation as though [she] had been spending time with him two minutes earlier." "How long can a girl be haunted by you?", she sings in one part. She continued to further explain the song's meaning:

I was kind of ashamed and a little embarrassed, but it was where I was at: just really being curious about how someone can have that much of an effect on me ... I do believe that I will be able to get to a point where hearing his name or even running into him or hearing from him won't trigger me as much as it did and still does. I don't know when that day will come but I'm singing about it hopefully coming."

== Critical reception ==
"Flinch" received mixed to favorable reviews from music critics. Larry Flick of Billboard described "Flinch" and the album's other track "That Particular Time" as one of the "expansive, introspective interludes [on the album]," also calling them "highly skilled, bravura turns – both in terms of lyrical content and performance." In a separate review of Under Rug Swept the song was named a "delicate ballad [that] recalls Joni Mitchell at her best". Mark Blake of Q picked as one of the album's peaks, noting that it "couch[es] the message in some of the most inviting music of her career." Chris Heath of Dotmusic wrote that the song "washes around your head - at first aimlessly but later seductively."

Rob Mitchum of Pitchfork Media believed that the song is about "what it feels like to be dumped by Dave Coulier," also praising Morissette's "unmitigated and highly concentrated ferocity of her lyrical confessions." Miles Marshall Lewis of LA Weekly called it "the most straight-ahead ballad at over six minutes", and that it "falls short of [Morissette's] majestic 'Uninvited'." Kimberly Reyes of Time wrote a mixed review for the song, calling it "a perfect example of her stream-of-consciousness posturing. With lines like, 'how long can a girl be tortured by you' the real question should be how many different ways can Morissette find to voice the same trite complaint?."

== Release and commercial performance ==
"Flinch" was released as a single only in Brazil, since it was included on the soundtrack of Brazilian soap opera "Desejos de Mulher" in 2002, being the main theme of the romantic couple played by actress Glória Pires and Eduardo Moscovis. It was released to Brazilian radio stations in mid-May 2002. It later debuted on the Brazilian Hot 100 chart, on 1 June 2002, before peaking at number 26, on 3 August 2002.

== Promotion and live performances ==
Morissette performed "Flinch" in Brazil as part of a showcase, directed by Mauro Mendonça Filho, for the television newsmagazine Fantástico. The singer also performed the track on "AOL Launch Party". "Flinch" was also included on her "Toward Our Union Mended Tour" (2002) and on the DVD "Feast on Scraps" (2002). After ten years without performing "Flinch", Morissette performed the track once again on selected dates of her "Guardian Angel Tour" (2012). "Flinch" was also included on her Live at Montreux 2012 CD/DVD.

== Charts ==
Chart (2002)	Peak position
Brazil (Hot 100 Brasil)	26
