= Jeremy Hillary Boob =

Fictional character from the film Yellow Submarine

Jeremy Hillary Boob, Ph.D.
- Yellow Submarine character
- First appearance: Yellow Submarine (1968)
- Created by: Heinz Edelmann
- Voiced by: Dick Emery

In-universe information
- Gender: Male
- Title: Doctor of Philosophy
- Occupation: Physicist; Botanist; Pianist; Satirical author Dentist; Classicist; Critic; Poet; Architect; Mechanic; Artist

Jeremy Hillary Boob, Ph.D. (also known as “The Nowhere Man”) is a fictional character appearing in the 1968 animated film Yellow Submarine, voiced by comedian Dick Emery. The character was conceived as a take-off of public intellectuals and polymaths such as Southern Methodist University professor Jeremy duQuesnay Adams and theatrical director and physician Jonathan Miller. Inspiration for overall appearance and voice was also taken from Maharishi Mahesh Yogi.

== Fictional character biography ==
In the film Yellow Submarine, the Beatles, on their way to save the fictitious region of Pepperland from the Blue Meanies, encounter Jeremy, a strange little brown-furred being with a blue clown-like face, pink ears and a pink, fluffy, rabbit-like tail. He has an extremely eccentric and flamboyant personality. He leaps and prances about and does a lot of pirouettes like a ballet dancer. He lives in the Sea of Nothing, also known as Nowhere Land, and speaks mostly in rhyme. He describes himself as an "eminent physicist, polyglot classicist, prize-winning botanist, hard-biting satirist, talented pianist, good dentist too." Paul mumbles, “Lousy poet”.

Jeremy also owns a mysterious purple and green object that can turn from a typewriter to a tree, to an easel, a piano, and numerous other things. He spends the vast majority of his time frenetically creating art, using the various transformations of the object. He is seen carving a stone bust of himself, editing a nearly finished book (he’s written 19), composing piano music, and painting in rapid succession. He also reviews his own works, but states "it's my policy to never read my reviews".

The band realises that one of their songs sums Jeremy up well and they sing "Nowhere Man" about him as he cavorts with their magic. However, he soon becomes sad and cries when he realizes they are going to leave. Feeling sorry for him, Ringo Starr offers to take him with them and he gratefully accepts. (He also learns about the phrase "down the hatch", saying that he must work it into his New Statesman piece.)

Later, the submarine breaks down, and Jeremy helps fix one of the propellers. This makes the submarine almost too efficient, and it speeds off without them. Jeremy is later kidnapped by one of the Blue Meanies guarding the outskirts of Pepperland and is eventually found in Pepperland, hanging by the leg to the branch of a tree. When Ringo cuts him down, he "fisticuffs" the guard that was guarding him before an apple drops on the guard, knocking him out. He then helps The Beatles to defeat the Meanies by covering the Chief Blue Meanie with flowers using one of his poems, thereby proving that a Nobody can in fact, be somebody. After that, Jeremy can be seen celebrating Pepperland's newfound peace along with the Chief Blue Meanie along with everyone else. Jeremy Eskimo-kisses the Chief as the Chief sheds a single tear.

Jeremy Hillary Boob also appears in the music video for "Glass Onion", released for the 50th anniversary of the album The Beatles (commonly known as "the White Album").

== Creation ==
Jeremy Hillary Boob was originally named Jeremy Y. du Q. Adams, after Southern Methodist University professor Jeremy duQuesnay Adams. The character of Jeremy was intended as a parody of public intellectuals and polymaths, most notably theatrical director and physician Jonathan Miller, with whom story writer Lee Minoff had previously worked. He is also alleged to have been inspired by Cambridge poet J. H. Prynne.
