= Hands Clean =

2002 single by Alanis Morissette

Single by Alanis Morissette

from the album Under Rug Swept
- B-side: "Sister Blister"
- Released: 8 January 2002
- Recorded: 2001
- Length: 4:31 (album version); 3:50 (radio edit)
- Label: Maverick; Reprise
- Songwriter: Alanis Morissette
- Producer: Alanis Morissette

Alanis Morissette singles chronology
"King of Pain" (2000)	"Hands Clean" (2002)	"Precious Illusions" (2002)

Music video
- "Hands Clean" on YouTube

"Hands Clean" is a song written, produced, and performed by Canadian singer-songwriter Alanis Morissette from her fifth studio album, Under Rug Swept (2002). It was released as the album's lead single in January 2002. The song features a shuffling, largely acoustic-rock framework. Lyrically, "Hands Clean" caused controversy, since it is reportedly the singer's recollection of a taboo sexual relationship she shared with a much older man when she was approximately 14 years of age.

The song received generally positive reviews from music critics, some of whom immediately chose the track as an album standout compared to some of her previous material. "Hands Clean" charted at number one in Canada and New Zealand while reaching the top 10 in Australia, Italy, the Netherlands, Norway, Portugal, Scotland, and Switzerland. An accompanying music video was released in 2002 for the single.

== Background and release ==
After Supposed Former Infatuation Junkie – the 1998 follow-up to her 1995 breakthrough Jagged Little Pill – Alanis Morissette joined MTV for an unplugged album, released in 1999. Subsequently, she neither wrote nor composed for a few months, before developing a new album, through 2000 and 2001. During that period, she acknowledged she had learned, "That men in positions of power were not to be entirely trusted with my body and soul just because they were older than me."

According to Jennifer Vineyeard of MTV News, the new album's topic was "love, sex, cruelty – with the added vantage of years spent growing up and getting over the man who vexed her so." Morissette wrote, composed, and produced Under Rug Swept by herself, claiming to have been inspired by events in her life, such as a break-up with her boyfriend and her contract renegotiation with Maverick. "I started writing alone," she said, "and within the first week I'd written seven songs. So it was all really fast and accelerated, and I think 'Hands Clean' was maybe the tenth song that I wrote and I just wrote it with a guitar in a room."

Of the 27 songs written for the album, "Hands Clean" was picked to be the first single and was released on 8 January 2002. Before its official release, the song debuted on German radio on 24 December 2001.

== Composition ==
"Hands Clean," written, composed, and produced entirely by Morissette, features a shuffling, largely acoustic-rock framework and a "pure-pop" hook. It is written in the key of G major, with a moderate tempo of 96 beats per minute. The introduction follows the chord progression of C–D–G/B–C that repeats throughout the song except for the bridge that is Em-C-G-D two times. Morissette's vocal range spans from the low-note of G3 to the high-note of B4. The narrative voice of the song alternates; the verses are written from the presumed viewpoint of the other person in a relationship, an older man talking to a younger lover ("If it weren't for your maturity none of this would have happened/If you weren't so wise beyond your years I would've been able to control myself" [...] "I know you depend on me like a young thing would to a guardian/I know you sexualize me like a young thing would and I think I like it"), whereas the chorus and bridge represent her own feelings ("We'll fast forward to a few years later/And no one knows except the both of us/And I have honoured your request for silence/And you've washed your hands clean of this").

Lyrically, "Hands Clean" explores a past relationship and how its effects linger. Jon Pareles of Rolling Stone went further, writing that the song is about "an apparently matter-of-fact reminiscence of underage sex with a music-business mentor, an affair 'under rug swept.'" However, he commented that the song holds not a hint of Lolita guilt, forbidden passion, or resentment compared to her furious take on the same situation in "Right Through You" on Jagged Little Pill. Website Jam! Music dug deeper, writing that it "tells the story of her attempts to come to grips with an intergenerational affair that started when she was as young as 14," a statement also made by other critics. In an interview for Q Magazine, Morissette confessed, "The grudge I hold is against myself for having been quiet for so long [...] I've covered his ass for so many years. So now it's almost like ... I wanted to liberate myself from not beating myself up any longer. It's almost irrespective of his involvement now; it's more about me and my relationship with my own past."

In a track-by-track commentary on her album, Morissette further commented about the track:

My intention in writing this song was to get to a place where I could be as truthful and as honest as I possibly could be about certain relationships in my past. It's definitely not with the intention of seeking any sort of revenge for the person who is at the heart of the song that I'm singing about, but it was in my silencing myself to protect somebody else that I was ultimately completely abandoning myself. And any time I speak untruths in my life, and oftentimes I feel that by not speaking the truth, by being silent, there's an element of untruth in that. Withholding the truth sometimes can feel just as horrible as a lie to me. So as I get older, I think I want more and more to introduce the bliss of speaking transparently and truthfully and as honestly as I possibly can, knowing that the truth in this case is my truth only.

== Critical reception ==
While choosing the song as a highlight from Under Rug Swept, Stephen Thomas Erlewine of AllMusic compared its lyrics to her earlier hit "You Oughta Know," also noting that "this would all seem calculated, an attempt to regain her chart status, if Morissette wasn't so unabashedly earnest, seemingly unembarrassed by her confessions." Stephen Thompson from The A.V. Club praised the track for being "a breezy new single" and "infectious enough to surpass the direst moment of 'Under Rug Swept.'" David Browne of Entertainment Weekly wrote that the song "could even be seen as a sequel to 'You Oughta Know,'" while Nikki Tranter of Popmatters compared the lyrical content on the song to her previous songs "Plastic" and "Jealous," from her first album, Alanis. Larry Flick of Billboard Magazine noted that the track show[s] Morissette "proudly wearing her affection for concise, pure-pop hooks," while Mark Blake of Q called it "one of the album's peaks." Kitty Empire of NME wrote a mixed review to the track, although calling it "a tolerable enough tune, mind, for those who think their chocolate craving says something poignant about their inner selves."

== Chart performance ==
"Hands Clean" was a commercial success in many territories, reaching the top 10 in over six countries while also reaching the top-twenty in seven others. In the United States, the song debuted at number 65 on the week of 2 February 2002, becoming that week's "Hot Shot Debut", and moved up to number 49 the following week. The song cracked the top 40 in its third week, climbing to number 39, and peaked five weeks later at number 23 due to an increase in radio play. On other Billboard component charts, the song managed to reach number 19 on the Mainstream Top 40 and number three on the Adult Top 40. In Canada, "Hands Clean" became her sixth number-one single. In the United Kingdom, the song managed to debut at number 12, becoming her most successful single since "Thank U" (1998) as well as her latest top-twenty single on the UK charts.

In Australia, "Hands Clean" debuted and peaked at number nine, on 8 February 2002. It became her highest-charting single there since "Ironic" in 1996 and her last to reach the top 10. It received a gold certification from the Australian Recording Industry Association for shipping over 35,000 units. In New Zealand, the song experienced more success, debuting at number 48 but peaking at number one ten weeks later. It became Morissette's most successful single and first number-one hit. The song also experienced commercial success in several European countries, including Italy, where it reached number three, Norway, peaking at number seven, and Switzerland, reaching number five.

== Music video ==
=== Background and release ===
Francis Lawrence directed the music video for "Hands Clean." It was shot in December 2001 and televised and broadcast in January 2002 for the single's worldwide release. Morissette recruited fans to appear in the music video by announcing a contest on her website in November 2001, which led to the casting of Germán Legarreta, Masiela Lusha, and Patricia Pineda, among others.

=== Synopsis ===
The video begins with Morissette sitting in a sushi bar when she spies a man (played by Chris Sarandon) as he enters. She has a flashback to a time when she spurned his unwanted advances, and it had an effect on her. Morissette's memories are displayed out on a television screen, and the process begins, recorded for public viewing and re-viewing. We see her writing about the relationship, guitar in hand, creating a song which she then records and takes to a record producer (played by Ian Gomez), who presses it as a CD. She is soon posing for the CD sleeve photograph (the photographer is played by Scott Thompson) and shooting a video, which is played all over the world, just as the CD is being flown across oceans, in order to be put on display at hip record stores, where it is snapped up by many eager hands, including a girl in a beanie (played by Lusha). The singer is seen performing the song on the radio (radio DJ is played by Dean Haglund). At the video's conclusion, set a year after its beginning, Morissette again sees her former suitor enter the same sushi bar. Through her song, and the process of it becoming a hit and then a memory, she has come to terms with her past relationship. On seeing this person who had a profound effect on her this second time, she is able to move on: before departing the restaurant, she picks up a napkin and wipes her hands clean.

== Track listings ==
Canadian CD single

1. "Hands Clean" – 4:29
2. "Sister Blister" – 4:10

UK and European CD1

1. "Hands Clean" – 4:29
2. "Unprodigal Daughter" – 4:09
3. "Symptoms" – 4:15

UK and European CD2; Australian CD1

1. "Hands Clean" – 4:29 (4:30 on Australian release)
2. "Fear of Bliss" – 4:36
3. "Sister Blister" – 4:10

Australian CD2; European maxi-CD single

1. "Hands Clean" – 4:29 (4:30 on Australian release)
2. "Awakening Americans" – 4:25
3. "Unprodigal Daughter" – 4:09
4. "Symptoms" – 4:15

== Personnel ==
Personnel are taken from the Canadian CD single liner notes.

- Alanis Morissette – vocals, electric guitar
- Nick Lashley – guitar
- Joel Shearer – guitar
- Gary Novak – drums
- Tim Thorney – acoustic guitar
- Chris Bruce – bass
- Jamie Muhoberac – keyboards
- Mark Stephens – piano

== Charts ==
=== Weekly charts ===
Weekly chart performance for "Hands Clean"
Chart (2002)	Peak position
Australia (ARIA)	9
Austria (Ö3 Austria Top 40)	12
Belgium (Ultratop 50 Flanders)	40
Belgium (Ultratop 50 Wallonia)	38
Canada (Nielsen SoundScan)	1
Canada CHR (Nielsen BDS)	1
Europe (Eurochart Hot 100)	19
France (SNEP)	66
Germany (GfK)	18
Ireland (IRMA)	13
Italy (FIMI)	3
Netherlands (Dutch Top 40)	6
Netherlands (Single Top 100)	15
New Zealand (Recorded Music NZ)	1
Norway (VG-lista)	7
Portugal (AFP)	3
Romania (Romanian Top 100)	99
Scottish Singles Sales (Official Charts)	9
Spain (Promusicae)	14
Sweden (Sverigetopplistan)	32
Switzerland (Schweizer Hitparade)	5
UK Singles (Official Charts)	12
US Billboard Hot 100	23
US Adult Alternative Airplay (Billboard)	3
US Adult Pop Airplay (Billboard)	3
US Pop Airplay (Billboard)	19
US CHR/Pop (Radio & Records)	20
US Hot AC (Radio & Records)	3
US Triple A (Radio & Records)	1

=== Year-end charts ===
Year-end chart performance for "Hands Clean"
Chart (2002)	Position
Australia (ARIA)	64
Brazil (Crowley)	47
Canada (Nielsen SoundScan)	27
Canada (Nielsen SoundScan) Parts 1 & 2	126
Canada Radio (Nielsen BDS)	10
Italy (FIMI)	24
Netherlands (Dutch Top 40)	60
Switzerland (Schweizer Hitparade)	84
US Billboard Hot 100	95
US Adult Top 40 (Billboard)	17
US Mainstream Top 40 (Billboard)	76
US Triple-A (Billboard)	27
US CHR/Pop (Radio & Records)	72
US Hot AC (Radio & Records)	15
US Triple A (Radio & Records)	12

== Certifications ==
Certifications for "Hands Clean"
Region	Certification	Certified units/sales
Australia (ARIA)	Gold	35,000^{^}
^{^} Shipments figures based on certification alone.

== Release history ==
Release dates and formats for "Hands Clean"
Region	Date	Format(s)	Label(s)	Ref(s).
United States	8 January 2002	Radio	Maverick	
Australia	28 January 2002	CD	Maverick; Reprise	
United Kingdom	18 February 2002	CD; cassette	Maverick	
