= Live at Montreux 2012 =

Live album (video) by Alanis Morissette
- Released: April 22, 2013
- Recorded: July 2, 2012
- Venue: Montreux Jazz Festival, Montreux
- Genre: Alternative rock, acoustic rock, pop rock
- Length: 98:00
- Label: Eagle Rock Entertainment
- Producer: Alanis Morissette

Alanis Morissette chronology
| Havoc and Bright Lights (2012) | Live at Montreux 2012 (2013) | Such Pretty Forks in the Road (2020) |

Alanis Morissette video chronology
| Live at Carling Academy – Brixton London (2008) | Live at Montreux 2012 (2013) |

Live at Montreux is a DVD/Blu-ray/CD release from Canadian singer-songwriter Alanis Morissette released on April 22, 2013. The DVD/Blu-ray was filmed at Montreux Jazz Festival, Switzerland. The concert was recorded as part of Morissette's Guardian Angel Tour, thus she performed several songs from the album Havoc and Bright Lights, which had not yet been released at the time.

== Track listing ==
=== DVD and Blu-ray ===
1. "I Remain" (Segue 1)
2. "Woman Down"
3. "All I Really Want"
4. "You Learn"
5. "Guardian"
6. "Flinch"
7. "Forgiven"*
8. "Hands Clean"
9. "I Remain" (Segue 2)
10. "Citizen of the Planet"
11. "Ironic"
12. "Havoc"
13. "Head Over Feet"
14. "Versions of Violence"
15. "I Remain" (Segue 3)
16. "You Oughta Know"
17. "Numb"
18. "Hand in My Pocket"
19. "Uninvited"
20. "Thank U"

=== CD ===
1. "I Remain"
2. "Woman Down"
3. "All I Really Want"
4. "You Learn"
5. "Guardian"
6. "Flinch"
7. "Hands Clean"
8. "Ironic"
9. "Havoc"
10. "Head Over Feet"
11. "Versions of Violence"
12. "You Oughta Know"
13. "Numb"
14. "Hand in My Pocket"
15. "Thank U"

== Personnel ==
- Alanis Morissette – vocals
- Julian Coryell – guitars
- Cedric Lemoyne – bass
- Jason Orme – guitars
- Victor Indrizzo – drums
- Michael Farrell – keyboards

== Charts ==
| Chart (2013) | Peak position |
|---|---|
| Belgian Albums (Ultratop Flanders) | 193 |
| Belgian Albums (Ultratop Wallonia) | 110 |
| German Albums (Offizielle Top 100) | 58 |
