= Flavors of Entanglement Tour =

2008–09 concert tour by Alanis Morissette

- Tour by Alanis Morissette
- Promotional poster for the tour
- Associated album: Flavors of Entanglement
- Start date: May 31, 2008
- End date: February 20, 2009
- Legs: 4
- No. of shows: 32 in Europe; 47 in North America; 12 in South America; 91 in total

Alanis Morissette concert chronology
- The Diamond Wink Tour (2005); Flavors of Entanglement Tour (2008–09); Guardian Angel Tour (2012)

The Flavors of Entanglement Tour was the seventh headlining concert tour by Canadian American recording artist, Alanis Morissette. The tour supports her seventh studio album, Flavors of Entanglement. Beginning in May 2008, the tour played over 90 shows in the Americas as well as throughout Europe.

== Background ==
During an interview with Billboard, Morissette announced the tour in May 2008. She stated the tour would begin with a performance a Rock in Rio Lisboa. The announcement came off the heels of her spring tour with Matchbox Twenty and Mutemath. Morissette would continue to tour Europe playing at various festivals, before hitting the U.S. and Canada. Rehearsals began May 9 in Los Angeles, with stage rehearsals taking place at the historic Pantages Theatre. After she completed the European leg, Morissette promoted her album in the U.S., July 2008. The North American leg began a month later, with a benefit concert for the Charlottesville Free Clinic. In December 2008, Brazilian entertainment company, Time For Fun revealed several shows in Brazil, her first time touring that nation in nearly eight years.

The June 19, 2008 show at the Carling Academy Brixton in London, England was filmed as a concert special for MSN. A part of their Music in Concert series, the show was available on the MSN site on July 23, 2008 and remained available for viewing for six months. The special was produced by Control Room. The full show was released on Blu-ray, titled Alanis Morissette: Live from Carling Brixton Academy, on July 28, 2008.

== Opening acts ==
- Liam Gerner (Europe, select dates)
- Alexi Murdoch (North America, select dates)
- L'Aura (Turin)
- Wade Morissette (Boise)

== Setlist ==
The following setlist is derived from the June 19, 2008 concert at the famed Carling Academy Brixton in London. It does not represent all concerts during the tour.

1. "Uninvited"
2. "All I Really Want"
3. "Eight Easy Steps"
4. "Perfect"
5. "Citizen of the Planet"
6. "Head over Feet"
7. "Unprodigal Daughter"
8. "Versions of Violence"
9. "Not as We"
10. "Hand in My Pocket"
11. "In Praise of the Vulnerable Man"
12. "A Man"
13. "Moratorium"
14. "You Oughta Know"
15. "Tapes"
  Encore
16. "Underneath"
17. "You Learn"
18. "Ironic"
19. "Thank U"

== Tour dates ==
Date	City	Country	Venue
Europe
May 31, 2008^{[A]}	Lisbon	Portugal	Parque da Bela Vista
June 1, 2008^{[B]}	Landgraaf	Netherlands	Megaland Landgraaf
June 4, 2008^{[C]}	Crans-près-Céligny	Switzerland	Port de Crans
June 5, 2008	Frankfurt	Germany	Alte Oper
June 6, 2008	Paris	France	Zénith de Paris
June 13, 2008	Amsterdam	Netherlands	Heineken Music Hall
June 13, 2008^{[D]}	Middelfart	Denmark	Hovedscenen
June 15, 2008^{[E]}	Oslo	Norway	Frognerbadet
June 18, 2008	Birmingham	England	Carling Academy Birmingham
June 19, 2008	London	England	Carling Academy Brixton
June 22, 2008^{[F]}	Mestre	Italy	Parco San Giuliano
June 24, 2008^{[G]}	Rome	Italy	Auditorium Cavea
June 25, 2008	Venaria Reale	Italy	Palace of Venaria
June 27, 2008^{[H]}	Madrid	Spain	Ciudad del Rock
June 28, 2008^{[I]}	Zaragoza	Spain	Anfiteatro 43
June 29, 2008	Barcelona	Spain	Espacio Movistar
July 2, 2008	Vienna	Austria	Halle Gasometer
July 4, 2008^{[J]}	Bucharest	Romania	Romexpo
July 5, 2008^{[K]}	Istanbul	Turkey	Parkorman
July 7, 2008	Munich	Germany	Circus Krone Building
July 8, 2008	Berlin	Germany	Tempodrom
July 9, 2008	Hamburg	Germany	CCH Hall 1
July 10, 2008	Cologne	Germany	Open-Air-Gelände am Tanzbrunnen
August 9, 2008^{[L]}	Monte Carlo	Monaco	Salle des étoiles
August 9, 2008^{[M]}	Colmar	France	Parc des Expositions de Colmar
August 10, 2008^{[N]}	Lokeren	Belgium	Grote Kaai
August 12, 2008	Prague	Czech Republic	Kongresové centrum Praha
August 13, 2008^{[O]}	Budapest	Hungary	Óbuda Island
August 16, 2008^{[P]}	Chelmsford	England	Hylands Park
August 17, 2008^{[P]}	Weston-under-Lizard	England	Weston Park
August 18, 2008	Glasgow	Scotland	Carling Academy Glasgow
August 19, 2008^{[Q]}	Dublin	Ireland	Marlay Park
North America
September 13, 2008^{[R]}	Charlottetown	Canada	Vista Bay
September 18, 2008^{[S]}	Charlottesville	United States	Charlottesville Pavilion
September 19, 2008	Upper Darby Township	United States	Tower Theater
September 20, 2008	Boston	United States	Orpheum Theatre
September 22, 2008	Washington, D.C.	United States	DAR Constitution Hall
September 23, 2008	Baltimore	United States	Lyric Opera House
September 24, 2008	Wallingford	United States	Chevrolet Theatre
September 26, 2008	New York City	United States	Radio City Music Hall
September 27, 2008	Atlantic City	United States	Borgata Music Box
September 29, 2008	Providence	United States	Providence Performing Arts Center
October 1, 2008	Cincinnati	United States	Taft Theatre
October 2, 2008	Chicago	United States	Chicago Theatre
October 4, 2008	Minneapolis	United States	Orpheum Theatre
October 5, 2008	Milwaukee	United States	Riverside Theater
October 7, 2008	Ann Arbor	United States	Michigan Theater
October 8, 2008	Toronto	Canada	Massey Hall
October 9, 2008	Montreal	Canada	Salle Wilfrid-Pelletier
October 11, 2008	Hamilton	Canada	Hamilton Place Theatre
October 12, 2008	Ottawa	Canada	Southam Hall
October 14, 2008	Louisville	United States	The Louisville Palace
October 15, 2008	Atlanta	United States	Cobb Energy Performing Arts Centre
October 16, 2008	Clearwater	United States	Ruth Eckerd Hall
October 18, 2008^{[T]}	Paradise Island	The Bahamas	Atlantis Grand Ballroom
October 20, 2008	Fort Lauderdale	United States	Au-Rene Theater
October 21, 2008	Orlando	United States	Hard Rock Live
October 23, 2008	Bossier City	United States	Riverdome at Horseshoe Bossier City
October 24, 2008	Houston	United States	Jones Hall
October 25, 2008	Grand Prairie	United States	Nokia Live at Grand Prairie
October 27, 2008	Tulsa	United States	Brady Theater
October 28, 2008	Kansas City	United States	The Midland by AMC
October 30, 2008^{[U]}	Denver	United States	Temple Hoyne Buell Theatre
November 2, 2008	Boise	United States	Morrison Center for the Performing Arts
November 4, 2008	Vancouver	Canada	Orpheum Theater
November 5, 2008	Seattle	United States	Paramount Theatre
November 6, 2008	Portland	United States	Arlene Schnitzer Concert Hall
November 10, 2008	San Diego	United States	San Diego Civic Theater
November 11, 2008	Phoenix	United States	Dodge Theatre
November 13, 2008	Los Angeles	United States	Oprheum Theatre
November 14, 2008	Los Angeles	United States	Oprheum Theatre
November 15, 2008	Las Vegas	United States	The Joint
November 17, 2008	Oakland	United States	Paramount Theatre
December 10, 2008^{[V]}	San Diego	United States	Anthology
December 11, 2008^{[W]}	Tucson	United States	Tucson Arena
December 12, 2008^{[X]}	San Francisco	United States	Mezzanine
South America
January 21, 2009	Manaus	Brazil	Auditório do Studio 5
January 23, 2009	Brasília	Brazil	Ginásio Nilson Nelson
January 24, 2009	Fortaleza	Brazil	Siará Hall
January 28, 2009^{[Y]}	Teresina	Brazil	Clube Atlantic City World Náutico
January 30, 2009	Recife	Brazil	Chevrolet Hall
January 31, 2009^{[Z]}	Salvador	Brazil	Parque de Exposições de Salvador
February 3, 2009	São Paulo	Brazil	Via Funchal
February 4, 2009	Rio de Janeiro	Brazil	HSBC Arena
February 5, 2009	Belo Horizonte	Brazil	Chevrolet Hall
February 7, 2009	Florianópolis	Brazil	Pacha Floripa
February 10, 2009	Porto Alegre	Brazil	Pepsi on Stage
February 12, 2009	Buenos Aires	Argentina	Luna Park
North America
February 16, 2009	Mexico City	Mexico	Auditorio Nacional
February 18, 2009	Monterrey	Mexico	Arena Monterrey
February 20, 2009	Zapopan	Mexico	Auditorio Telmex

Festivals and other miscellaneous performances

^{A} Rock in Rio Lisboa
^{B} Pinkpop Festival
^{C} Caribana Festival
^{D} Rock under Broen
^{E} Norwegian Wood
^{F} Heineken Jammin' Festival
^{G} Luglio suona bene
^{H} Rock in Rio Madrid
^{I} Exposición Internacional de Zaragoza
^{J} B'EstFest
^{K} Masstival
^{L} Monte-Carlo Sporting Summer Festival
^{M} Foire aux vins d'Alsace
^{N} Lokerse Feesten
^{O} Sziget Festival
^{P} V Festival
^{Q} Marlay Park Summer Concert Series
^{R} Summerset Music Festival
^{S} CFC Benefit Concert 2008
^{T} Atlantis Live Concert Series
^{U} KBCO Studio C 20th Anniversary Concert
^{V} Sohie@103.7's Green Christmas
^{W} 92.9 The Mountain presents the Listener Appreciation Concert
^{X} Alice 97.3's Green Christmas
^{Y} Projeto Verão Coca-Cola Zero
^{Z} Festival de Verão de Salvador

=== Box office score data ===
Venue	City	Tickets sold / available	Gross revenue
Tower Theater	Upper Darby Township	2,080 / 3,064 (68%)	$80,533
Orpheum Theatre	Boston	2,744 / 2,744 (100%)	$116,430
DAR Constitution Hall	Washington, D.C.	2,455 / 3,250 (75%)	$81,796
Lyric Opera House	Baltimore	1,519 / 2,495 (61%)	$59,965
Chevrolet Theatre	Wallingford	2,226 / 2,516 (88%)	$72,934
Radio City Music Hall	New York City	5,835 / 5,835 (100%)	$365,812
Providence Performing Arts Center	Providence	1,110 / 2,251 (49%)	$52,024
Taft Theatre	Cincinnati	1,401 / 2,464 (57%)	$68,107
Chicago Theatre	Chicago	3,202 / 3,402 (94%)	$187,219
Orpheum Theatre	Minneapolis	1,603 / 2,478 (65%)	$95,242
Michigan Theater	Ann Arbor	1,469 / 1,652 (89%)	$88,389
Salle Wilfrid-Pelletier	Montreal	2,523 / 2,960 (85%)	$143,757
Southam Hall	Ottawa	2,071 / 2,323 (89%)	$113,541
Cobb Energy Performing Arts Centre	Atlanta	1,643 / 2,001 (82%)	$78,040
Ruth Eckerd Hall	Clearwater	1,409 / 2,035 (69%)	$93,270
Au-Rene Theater	Fort Lauderdale	2,174 / 2,719 (80%)	$134,800
Hard Rock Live	Orlando	1,852 / 2,402 (77%)	$97,259
Riverdome at Horseshoe Bossier City	Bossier City	1,170 / 1,400 (83%)	$85,980
Nokia Live at Grand Prairie	Grand Prairie	2,093 / 2,240 (93%)	$119,715
The Midland by AMC	Kansas City	1,049 / 1,240 (85%)	$57,893
Morrison Center for the Performing Arts	Boise	1,067 / 2,007 (53%)	$52,830
Paramount Theatre	Seattle	1,859 / 2,835 (65%)	$98,696
Arlene Schnitzer Concert Hall	Portland	1,531 / 2,758 (55%)	$78,532
San Diego Civic Theater	San Diego	1,574 / 2,675 (59%)	$78,622
Dodge Theatre	Phoenix	1,885 / 3,064 (61%)	$77,211
Oprheum Theatre	Los Angeles	3,274 / 3,664 (89%)	$194,199
The Joint	Las Vegas	1,481 / 1,481 (100%)	$89,885
Paramount Theatre	Oakland	2,068 / 2,759 (75%)	$122,475
Auditório do Studio 5	Manaus	4,844 / 7,000 (69%)	$148,662
Ginásio Nilson Nelson	Brasília	2,549 / 6,000 (42%)	$90,360
Siará Hall	Fortaleza	6,112 / 6,500 (94%)	$231,798
Clube Atlantic City World Náutico	Teresina	5,227 / 7,000 (75%)	$173,163
Chevrolet Hall	Recife	10,850 / 10,850 (100%)	$169,658
Via Funchal	São Paulo	5,642 / 5,642 (100%)	$359,181
HSBC Arena	Rio de Janeiro	3,982 / 8,000 (50%)	$249,729
Chevrolet Hall	Belo Horizonte	4,588 / 5,000 (92%)	$227,702
Pacha Floripa	Florianópolis	5,897 / 9,500 (62%)	$252,726
Pepsi on Stage	Porto Alegre	4,137 / 6,500 (64%)	$229,852
Luna Park	Buenos Aires	5,585 / 5,600 (~100%)	$281,138
Auditorio Nacional	Mexico City	5,238 / 9,683 (54%)	$223,515
TOTAL		121,018 / 159,989 (76%)	$5,622,640

== Band ==
- Guitar: David Levita and Jason Paul Orme
- Bass guitar: Cedric Lemoyne Williams
- Drums: Victor Indrizzo
- Keyboards: Vincent Leslie Jones
