= Not as We =

Single by Alanis Morissette

from the album Flavors of Entanglement
- Released: November 25, 2008
- Recorded: 2007
- Studio: The Village Recorder (Los Angeles, CA); Frou Frou Central (London, England)
- Genre: Piano rock
- Length: 4:45 (album version); 4:24 (radio edit)
- Label: Maverick
- Songwriters: Alanis Morissette; Guy Sigsworth
- Producer: Guy Sigsworth

Alanis Morissette singles chronology
"In Praise of the Vulnerable Man" (2008)	"Not as We" (2008)	"Guardian" (2012)

Music video
- "Not as We" on YouTube

"Not as We" is a song by the Canadian singer and songwriter Alanis Morissette, taken from her seventh studio album, Flavors of Entanglement (2008). It was written by Morissette and its producer Guy Sigsworth, and it was released as the album's second single in North America on November 25, 2008, while "In Praise of the Vulnerable Man" was released as the second single in Europe.

A piano-driven ballad, "Not as We" deals with a heart-wrenching break-up and the early stages of recovery. The song was critically acclaimed, with most critics commending its vulnerability, while choosing it as one of the best songs of the album. The song first premiered on the American television series House in its fourth season (on the episode 3, "97 Seconds"). "Not as We" was remixed when released as a single, with the radio edit of it adding guitars, bass and background effects.

When its parent album was released, "Not as We" charted in the lower regions of the United States and the United Kingdom charts, but it failed to ressurge when it was released as a single. A music video directed by James Whitaker was released on October 2, 2008, and it features Morissette recovering from a painful break-up similarly to what it's portrayed in its lyrics. The song was performed on the Flavors of Entanglement Tour (2008) and in some television shows.

== Background and release ==
"Not as We" is a fruit of a collaboration between Morissette and the songwriter Guy Sigsworth in 2007. The pair had worked on 13 songs for the album, as of October 2007, with other eight more being in the process of writing. In April of the same year, Morissette debuted the song at Tom Morello's L.A.'s Hotel Cafe concert. About the collaboration, Sigsworth revealed: "She's a dream to work with - she's totally into my sound world. If I make a noise that makes me feel a certain way, I know it's going to make her feel that way too. I wrote twenty-five songs with her. [...] She can write a song so quickly. It's truly amazing."

After its premature premiere a year later, "Not as We" was finally released on its parent album, Flavors of Entanglement, on May 30, 2008. Eventually, the song was commissioned to be released as the second single from the album in North America, while the song "In Praise of the Vulnerable Man" was released as the second single in Europe. Its announcement occurred during the Jay Leno Show and afterwards on Morissette's official website. The single's EP was released on December 2, 2008, featuring six remixes and a radio edit of the song.

== Composition and lyrics ==
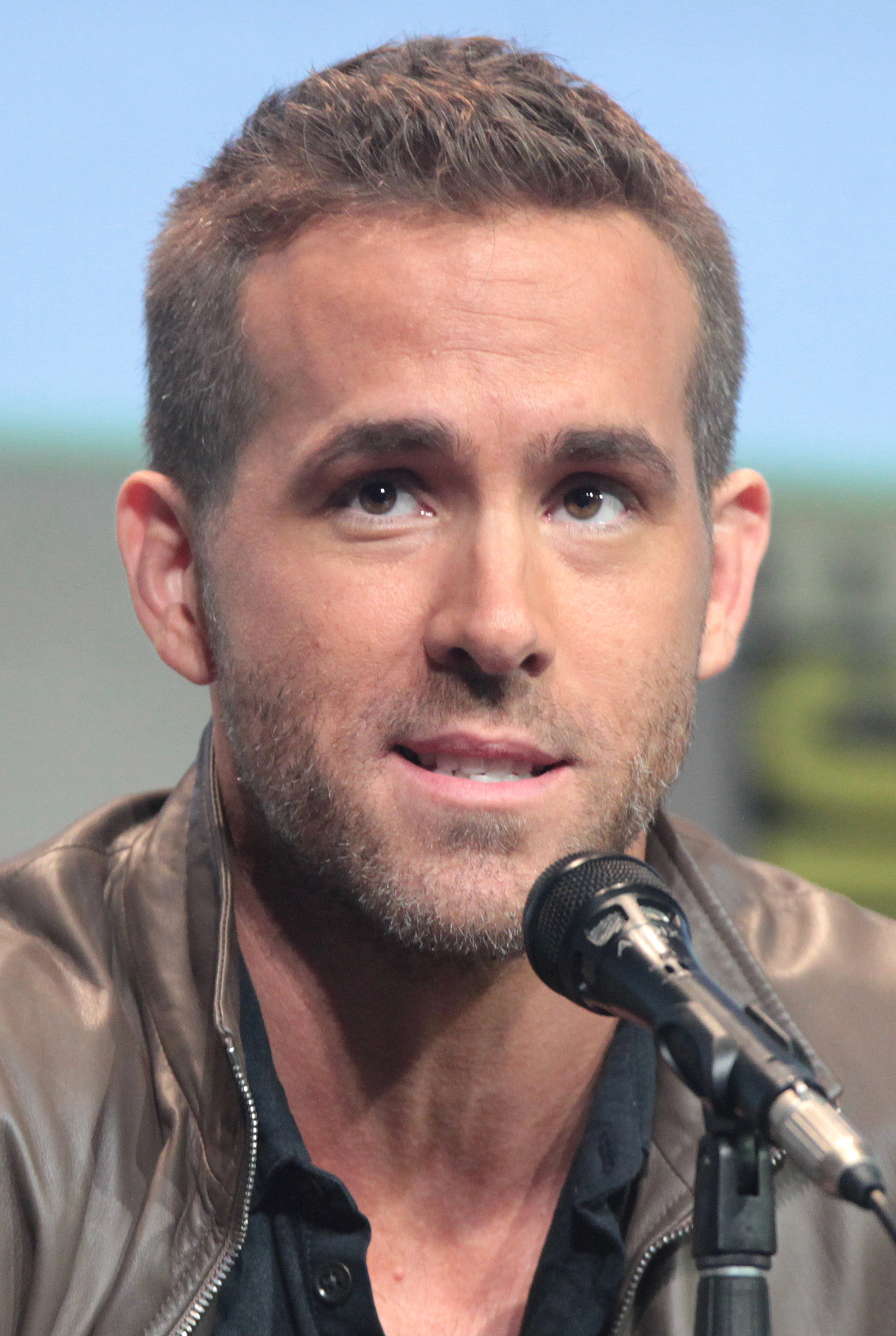
Morissette's relationship with actor Ryan Reynolds was the rumoured inspiration behind the track.

Written by Morissette with its producer Guy Sigsworth, "Not as We" is a piano-driven ballad, with Sigsworth also playing it. The song was recorded at The Village Studio Recorders in Los Angeles, California, and Frou Frou Central, in London. As remarked by the author Karen Fournier, the song is "notable for its spare accompaniment, provided by Sigsworth on an acoustic piano, and for overall calmness that contrasts sharply with the violence that preceded it" (referring to the album's previous track, "Versions of Violence"). It was considered "quite and vulnerable" by The Montreal Gazette. The shorter radio edit of the song adds guitars, bass and background effects and starts with the first line of the song while the album version has an instrumental opening.

Lyrically, "Not as We" deals with the dissolution of a relationship and the struggle to start over again, capturing "the angst of the newly single." As stated by Fournier, it "describes the 'rebirth' of the narrator and her willingness to embrace solitude as an optimal alternative to the emotional violence that she endured at the hands of her partner in the previous track". Critics believed that the song was inspired by the end of her three-year relationship with actor Ryan Reynolds. Morissette commented about the track, saying, "You know how you can resist hitting rock bottom for a long time? That song just goes ‘ok, I’m going. All the way down’."

== Critical reception ==
Reception towards the track was generally positive, with some critics commending users to download the track and others praising it as a "highlight". Christa L. Titus of Billboard commented, "every wall is torn down for vulnerable piano prayer 'Not as We'." Quentin B. Huff of PopMatters was "enamored" with the song, calling it a "gorgeous balladry", whilst The Canwest News Service from The Montreal Gazette called it a "beautiful piano-and-voice tear-jerker." Leah Greenblatt, writing for Entertainment Weekly, wrote that "her most affecting moment may be the most stripped-down. A barely there piano is all the accompaniment needed on the broken, fragile ballad "Not as We," on which her voice cracks heartbreakingly over the lines "From scratch begin again, but this time, I as I/And not as we." Chad Grischow from IGN described it as "a crisp, timid piano ballad that serves as a breather from all the distorted electronic pop. It features some of the best vocals on the album, as she cautiously connects with the tale of learning to be on her own again."

Shaun Newport of musicOMH praised the song's simplicity, claiming that "[it] is the best evocation on the whole album and a time where Morissette can bring another new aspect of her growing personality to the fore. She manages at once to be hopeful, in mourning solemn and vulnerable." Alex Young of Consequence praised it, saying that "her poetic lyrics are admirable, and though her voice (in my personal view) isn’t made for these songs, it’s a broad track and is worth a couple listens." Writing for Entertainment Focus, Pip Ellwood-Hughes wrote that Morissette "catches you completely off-guard on the gorgeous piano ballad 'Not As We'." Rolling Stone's Ellen Carpenter agreed, noting that "Morissette is at her best on simple piano ballads like 'Not as We'." While calling it a "highlight of the album", Joanna Hunkin from The New Zealand Herald noticed, "as the record approaches halfway, the anger breaks and sadness reigns on the softly haunting, Not As We." Chris Marling of The Line of Best Fit was less favorable, labelling it a "deathly dull piano ballad".

== Music video ==
The music video was shot in Los Angeles on September 10, 2008. It was directed by James Whitaker and produced through RSA's promo division Black Dog Films. It features imagery identifiable as being shot at Half Moon Bay. It premiered on Yahoo! Music on the night of October 2, 2008. The video depicts an intimate portrait of the narrator in the aftermath of a breakup and features Morissette in various stages on the path to emotional recovery after a devastating event that remains unidentified in the video, but most likely refers to the breakup. According to the author Fournier, the song recalls the video from her 1992 video, "No Apologies", due to the visual simplicity and "its stark depiction of solitude." She went on to describe the video, saying:

"The camera follows Morissette through various portions of a single day as she sits alone with her journal in hand in the window of her house, as she walks on the beach at Half Moon Bay in the evening, as she drinks a cup of tea while sitting on her bed, and as she takes a bath in preparation for bed. Interspersed throughout the narrative are scenes in which Morissette seeks comfort from other people. An older female friend or mother figure appears to dispense advice, and Morissette pays a visit to a male therapist."

== Promotion and live performances ==
"Not as We" had its debut on television during the fourth season of the American medical drama television series, House, on October 9, 2007, almost a year prior to the album's release. The song is played during the episode "97 Seconds", where House contemplates the afterlife. After the album's release, Morissette promoted the track during the Jay Leno Show, Rosie Live and AOL Sessions. The song was also part of the Flavors of Entanglement Tour (2008-2009).

== Track listing ==
CD Single

1. "Not as We" (Radio Edit)
2. "Not as We" (Album Version)

DMD Maxi Remix EP

1. "Not as We" (Radio Edit)
2. "Not as We" (Jack Shaft Radio Edit)
3. "Not as We" (Blow-Up Edit)
4. "Not as We" (Dangerous Muse Edit)
5. "Not as We" (Eddie Amador's multipressor Edit)
6. "Not as We" (DJ Lynnwood's Reborn Edit)
7. "Not as We" (Holosound Edit)

Digital Remixes

1. "Not as We" (Blow-Up Mix) - 7:36
2. "Not as We" (Dangerous Muse Remix) - 7:46
3. "Not as We" (DJ Lynnewood's Reborn Remix) - 8:57
4. "Not as We" (Eddie Amador's Multipressor Remix) - 7:47
5. "Not as We" (Holosound Mix) - 7:33
6. "Not as We" (Jack Shaft Extended Edit) - 7:02

== Charts ==
The song unexpectedly charted when the album was released due to downloads of the song, resulting in a position of 22 on the Billboard Bubbling Under Hot 100 Singles chart. As of December 2008, the song had already sold 38,000 paid downloads, according to Billboard. The digital downloads also helped the song reach the lower parts of UK Singles Chart (#197) despite the single not being commercially released in the United Kingdom.

Chart (2008)	Peak position
UK Singles (Official Charts Company)	197
US Billboard Bubbling Under Hot 100 Singles	22
