= Guardian Angel Tour =

2012 concert tour by Alanis Morissette

- Tour by Alanis Morissette
- Promotional poster for the tour
- Associated album: Havoc and Bright Lights
- Start date: June 25, 2012
- End date: December 3, 2012
- Legs: 4
- No. of shows: 29 in Europe; 26 in North America; 8 in South America; 1 in Asia; 63 in total

Alanis Morissette concert chronology
- Flavors of Entanglement Tour (2008–09); Guardian Angel Tour (2012); Intimate and Acoustic (2014)

The Guardian Angel Tour was a concert tour by Canadian-American musician Alanis Morissette. The tour promoted her August 2012 album Havoc and Bright Lights. The tour ran from June to December 2012 and took place in Europe, North America and South America, including the countries of United Kingdom, France, Switzerland, Belgium, Netherlands, Germany, Austria, Czech Republic, Italy, Brazil and Israel.

== Opening act ==
- Souleye (select dates)
- Athlete (November 28–30, 2012)

== Setlist ==
The following songs were performed at the Nokia Hal in Tel Aviv, Israel on December 3, 2012. It does not represent all concerts during the tour.

1. "Woman Down"
2. "All I Really Want"
3. "You Learn"
4. "Guardian"
5. "Mary Jane"
6. "Receive"
7. "Right Through You"
8. "So Pure"
9. "Ironic"
10. "Havoc"
11. "Head over Feet"
12. "Lens"
13. "21 Things I Want in a Lover"
14. "Uninvited"
15. "You Oughta Know"
16. "Numb"
  Acoustic set
17. "Empathy"
18. "Hand in My Pocket"
19. "Your House"
  Encore
20. "Thank U"

== Tour dates ==
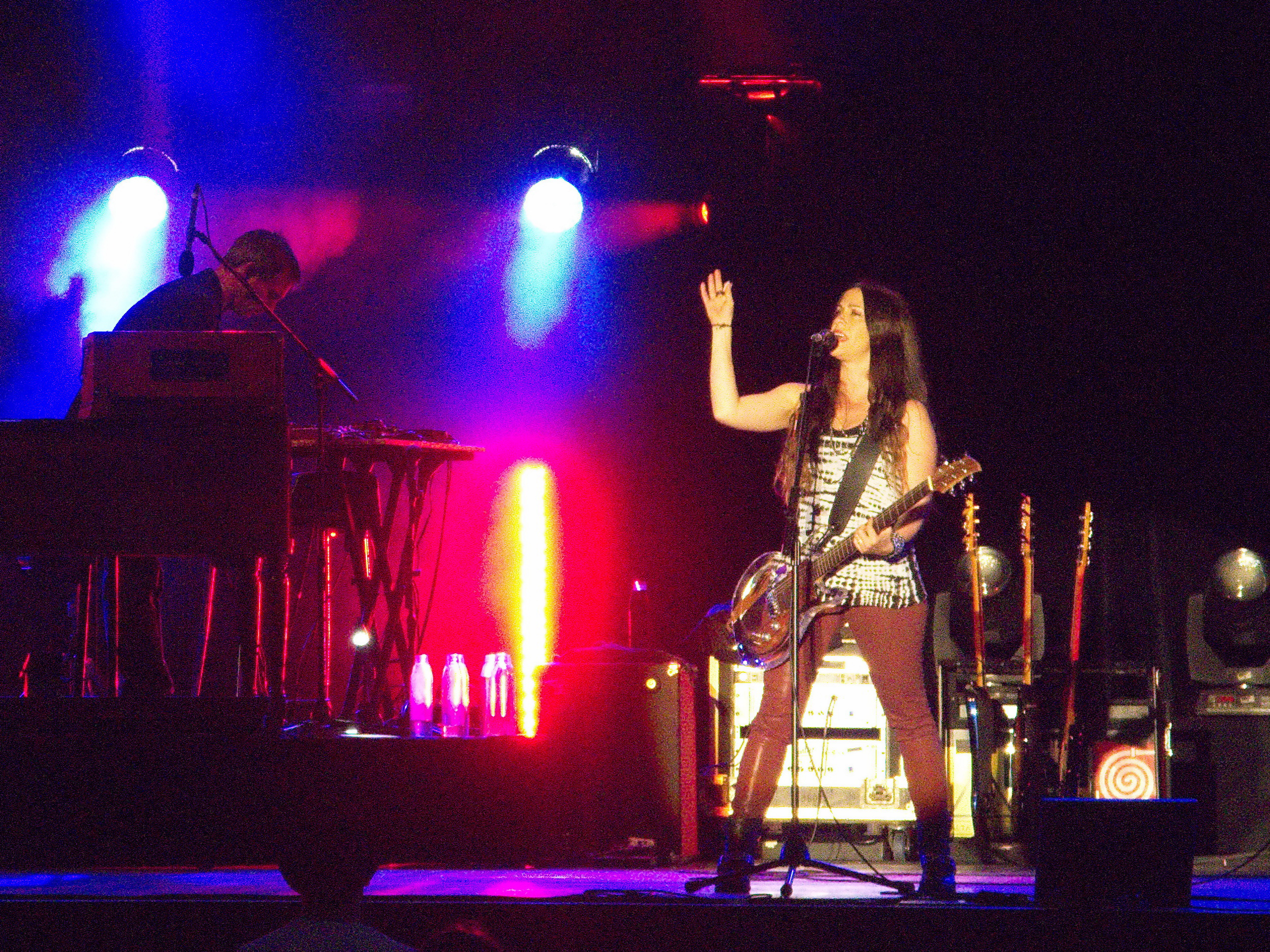
Morissette performing at 'Live at Sunset' in Zürich

| Date | City | Country | Venue |
|---|---|---|---|
Europe
| June 25, 2012 | Birmingham | England | O_{2} Academy Birmingham |
| June 26, 2012 | Manchester | England | O_{2} Apollo Manchester |
| June 27, 2012 | London | England | O_{2} Academy Brixton |
| June 30, 2012 | Paris | France | Zénith de Paris |
| July 2, 2012^{[A]} | Montreux | Switzerland | Auditorium Stravinski |
| July 3, 2012 | Lyon | France | Halle Tony Garnier |
| July 4, 2012 | Strasbourg | France | Zénith de Strasbourg |
| July 6, 2012 | Le Grand-Quevilly | France | Zénith de Rouen |
| July 7, 2012^{[B]} | Zottegem | Belgium | Poort van de Vlaamse Ardennen |
| July 8, 2012^{[C]} | Weert | Netherlands | Sportpark Boshoven |
| July 10, 2012 | Berlin | Germany | Spandau Citadel |
| July 13, 2012 | Vienna | Austria | Arena Wien Freiluftbühne |
| July 14, 2012^{[D]} | Ostrava | Czech Republic | Dolní Vítkovice |
| July 16, 2012^{[E]} | Zürich | Switzerland | Zürcher Adlisberg |
| July 17, 2012^{[F]} | Piazzola sul Brenta | Italy | Anfiteatro Camerini |
| July 18, 2012^{[G]} | Milan | Italy | Ippodromo del Galoppo di San Siro |
| July 20, 2012 | Florence | Italy | Cavea del Nuovo Teatro dell'Opera |
| July 21, 2012^{[H]} | Rome | Italy | Auditorium Cavea |
North America
| August 25, 2012 | Montclair | United States | Wellmont Theatre |
| August 26, 2012 | Huntington | United States | Paramount Theatre |
| August 29, 2012 | Atlantic City | United States | House of Blues |
South America
| September 2, 2012 | São Paulo | Brazil | Credicard Hall |
| September 3, 2012 | São Paulo | Brazil | Credicard Hall |
| September 5, 2012 | Curitiba | Brazil | Curitiba Master Hall |
| September 7, 2012 | Rio de Janeiro | Brazil | Citibank Hall |
| September 9, 2012 | Belo Horizonte | Brazil | Chevrolet Hall |
| September 12, 2012 | Olinda | Brazil | Chevrolet Hall |
| September 14, 2012 | Belém | Brazil | Cidade da Folia |
| September 16, 2012 | Goiânia | Brazil | Goiânia Arena |
North America
| September 24, 2012 | San Diego | United States | Humphreys Concerts by the Bay |
| September 26, 2012 | Pomona | United States | Pomona Fox Theater |
| October 2, 2012 | Big Sur | United States | Henry Miller Memorial Library |
| October 4, 2012 | Vancouver | Canada | The Centre in Vancouver for Performing Arts |
| October 5, 2012 | Seattle | United States | Moore Theatre |
| October 7, 2012 | Portland | United States | Crystal Ballroom |
| October 8, 2012 | Boise | United States | Knitting Factory |
| October 10, 2012 | Denver | United States | Paramount Theatre |
| October 12, 2012 | Minneapolis | United States | State Theatre |
| October 13, 2012 | Chicago | United States | Riviera Theatre |
| October 15, 2012 | Toronto | Canada | Sound Academy |
| October 16, 2012 | Montreal | Canada | Métropolis |
| October 17, 2012 | Boston | United States | House of Blues |
| October 19, 2012 | Waterbury | United States | Palace Theater |
| October 20, 2012 | Philadelphia | United States | Electric Factory |
| October 22, 2012 | New York City | United States | Terminal 5 |
| October 23, 2012 | Silver Spring | United States | The Fillmore Silver Spring |
| October 25, 2012 | Atlanta | United States | The Tabernacle |
| October 26, 2012 | Nashville | United States | Ryman Auditorium |
| October 28, 2012^{[I]} | Houston | United States | Bayou Music Center |
| October 30, 2012 | Austin | United States | Waller Creek Amphitheatre |
| November 1, 2012 | Phoenix | United States | Comerica Theatre |
| November 2, 2012 | Los Angeles | United States | Club Nokia |
Europe
| November 11, 2012 | Esch-sur-Alzette | Luxembourg | Rockhal |
| November 14, 2012 | Munich | Germany | Kesselhaus |
| November 16, 2012 | Frankfurt | Germany | Jahrhunderthalle |
| November 18, 2012 | Hamburg | Germany | CCH 1 |
| November 19, 2012 | Düsseldorf | Germany | Mitsubishi Electric Halle |
| November 21, 2012 | Tilburg | Netherlands | 013 Club |
| November 23, 2012 | Brussels | Belgium | Forest Nacional Club |
| November 26, 2012 | Paris | France | Olumpia Theatre |
| November 28, 2012 | London | England | The O_{2} Arena |
| November 29, 2012 | Nottingham | England | Capital FM Arena Nottingham |
| November 30, 2012 | Liverpool | England | Echo Arena Liverpool |
Asia
| December 3, 2012 | Tel Aviv | Israel | Nokia Arena |

Festivals and other miscellaneous performances
^{A} Montreux Jazz Festival
^{B} Rock Zottegem
^{C} Bospop
^{D} Colours of Ostrava
^{E} Live at Sunset
^{F} Hydrogen Festival
^{G} City Sound Milano
^{H} Luglio suona bene
^{I} Bosom Ball

Cancellations and rescheduled shows

| September 29, 2012 | Las Vegas | Desert Breeze Park | Cancelled. This concert was a part of "Bite of Las Vegas". |

== Personnel ==
- Alanis Morissette – vocals/guitar/harmonica
- Julian Coryell – guitar
- Michael Farrell – keyboards
- Jason Orme – guitar
- Cedric Lemoyne – bass guitar
- Victor Indrizzo – drums

Personnel credits are taken from Morissette's official website.
