= Michael Furey =

Michael Furey may refer to:

- Sax Rohmer, who wrote his occult novel Wulfheim under this name
- Michael Furey, a character in "The Dead", the last short story in Dubliners by James Joyce
- Mike Furey, singer and songwriter for Dangerous Muse

== See also ==
- Michael Fury, ring name used by wrestler Michael Iorio
- Mike Furrey (born 1977), American football player
