= List of The Rosie Show episodes =

The following is a list of episodes for The Rosie Show.

== Episodes ==
=== 2011 ===
No.	Original release date	Guest(s)
1	October 10, 2011	Russell Brand, cameo by Oprah Winfrey
LIVE Series Premiere. 497,000 viewers on OWN, 1.5 million viewers across Discovery channels/
2	October 11, 2011	Wanda Sykes, Gloria Estefan
417,000 viewers on OWN.
3	October 12, 2011	Roseanne Barr
LIVE show.
4	October 13, 2011	Lisa Kudrow, the cast of Priscilla Queen of the Desert
The Ready, Set, Go exercise and weight loss program is launched with 25 viewers.
5	October 14, 2011	Valerie Harper, Kevin Bacon and the Bacon Brothers
6	October 17, 2011	Sharon and Kelly Osbourne, Boyz II Men
7	October 18, 2011	Fran Drescher, Cheryl Hines
Hines' mother Rosemary stops by for a drink and a chat.
8	October 19, 2011	Chynna Phillips, Billy Baldwin, Little Big Town
LIVE show. Sgt. Shamar Thomas discusses his Occupy Wall Street experience.
9	October 20, 2011	Cedric the Entertainer, Nancy Grace
LIVE show. Author Naomi Wolfe discusses her Occupy Wall Street experience.
10	October 21, 2011	Rosie Reality Episode 1
Go behind the scenes of Rosie's first day at Harpo Studios. To get to know the staff—and the city—a little better, Rosie takes them on a bus and boat tour of Chicago. Then, take a tour of Rosie's new state-of-the-art studio and get a look at the new Harpo Studios sign.
11	October 24, 2011	Bob Newhart, Tracy Morgan
12	October 25, 2011	Sara Ramirez, Common
13	October 26, 2011	Brett Butler, Frank DeCaro
LIVE show. Audience member Hollee Chanel becomes new announcer for The Rosie Show.
14	October 27, 2011	Debi Mazar, Gabriele Corcos
LIVE show. Robbie Montgomery stops by with her son to chat about their OWN show, Welcome to Sweetie Pies.
15	October 28, 2011	Jerry Ferrara, Gloria Estefan
16	October 31, 2011	Rosie's Enchanted Halloween with Criss Angel, Caroline Manzo, Duff Goldman
Brother-sister duo Erik and Courtney share their knowledge of bugs and reptiles.
17	November 1, 2011	Sarah, Duchess of York, Wendy Liebman
LIVE show.
18	November 2, 2011	A Tribute to Phyllis Diller
A tribute video from some of today's top female comedians (including Joy Behar, Chelsea Handler, Kathy Griffin, and Sandra Bernhard) is presented to Diller.
19	November 3, 2011	Martin Short, Kool & the Gang
20	November 4, 2011	Rosie Reality Episode 2
Rosie and her staffers are dishing all the dirt about the premiere. Rosie gets back onstage to practice for her return to television with a series of test shows. Then, she decides to go live with Russell for her first show.
21	November 7, 2011	Salma Hayek, Antonio Banderas
The Rosie Show musical director Katreese Barnes performs an original song.
22	November 8, 2011	Mariah Carey
The Jenny, Set, Go Reveal.
23	November 9, 2011	Lisa Ling
The audience is made up of 100 sets of twins, as Ling discusses an episode of Our America that focusses on twin identity.
24	November 10, 2011	Florence Henderson, Kool & the Gang
25	November 11, 2011	Molly Shannon
26	November 14, 2011	Rachael Ray, Chaz Bono
Rosie chats with Jazz, star of the upcoming OWN documentary I am Jazz: A Family in Transition.
27	November 15, 2011	Cyndi Lauper, Holland Taylor
Rosie reacts to former Penn State defensive coordinator Jerry Sandusky's claims of innocence.
28	November 16, 2011	Jenny McCarthy
29	November 17, 2011	Kody Brown and Sister Wives Meri, Janelle and Christine
30	November 18, 2011	Ellen Barkin
Rosie shares her thoughts about Occupy Wall Street.
31	December 5, 2011	Marlee Matlin, Patti LaBelle
32	December 16, 2011	Rosie Plays Hardball with Chris Matthews, the cast of Million Dollar Quartet
Rosie announces her engagement to New York-based headhunter, Michelle Rounds. Katrina Markoff stops by, the owner of Vosges Haut-Chocolat- the best chocolate Rosie says she's ever tasted.
33	December 7, 2011	Rosie Reality Episode 3
Watch some of Rosie's favorite never-before-seen interviews from test shows with stars like funnyman Jim Belushi, top dog Randy Jackson, longtime friends Joan and Ann Cusack, Modern Family's Nolan Gould, Henry "the Fonz" Winkler and many more!
34	December 8, 2011	Hollywood's Hottest Young Stars with Elle Fanning, Colin Ford, Hunter Parrish, the cast of Godspell
35	December 9, 2011	Dog the Bounty Hunter, Beth Chapman
36	December 12, 2011	A Tribute to Jane Fonda
37	December 13, 2011	Donny and Marie Osmond
38	December 14, 2011	Rosie's Holiday Dreams Come True with Justin Bieber, Mindless Behavior
Rosie grants holiday wishes for truly deserving people.
39	December 15, 2011	Rosie's 2011 Comedy Wrap Up with Kevin Meaney, Kathy Najimy, Lizz Winstead, The Dan Band
A video with highlights from episodes of The Rosie Show is shown as part of the 2011 review.
40	December 16, 2011	It's a Crafty Christmas! with Bobby Pearce, Casey Gorab, Marjorie Johnson
Rosie hosts a new Rosie Show tradition, the first-ever Ugly Christmas Sweater Pageant.

=== 2012 ===
No.	Original release date	Guest(s)
41	January 2, 2012	A Salute to Penny Marshall
A tribute video from some of Marshall's celebrity friends (including Tom Hanks, Drew Barrymore, and Mark Wahlberg) is presented to her on the show.
42	January 3, 2012	An 11-Year-Old Boy's Dreams Come True, Plus RuPaul, The Commodores
Sara Blakely, the inventor of Spanx, stops by the show.
43	January 4, 2012	Rosie Reality: A Big Dream Comes True Episode 4
An exclusive look at what it takes to get the show off the ground. See how the writers and Rosie come up with song parodies, what went into the Halloween extravaganza and where Rosie finds relief from terrible allergies. Plus, Rosie Show producer Bobby Pearce brings his amazing costumes and musical theater know-how to the show. Then, watch as Rosie and the staff discover Hollee—and as Hollee discovers her new calling as the show's announcer.
44	January 5, 2012	Emmy Rossum, William H. Macy, and the cast of Shameless
45	January 9, 2012	Rosie's Game Show Showdown
The best of Rosie's game segments.
46	January 10, 2012	Saturday Night Live Star Darrell Hammond: The Interview You Didn't See, Plus Tori Amos
Rosie chats with the producers of TLC's "My Strange Addiction"
47	January 11, 2012	Jackée Harry, Rosie Performs with Styx
Rosie chats with a cheese monger in her first Meet the Audience segment.
48	January 12, 2012	Funnyman Louie Anderson, Olympian Oksana Baiul
49	January 13, 2012	Country Music Royalty Rosanne Cash
Plus, meet an 84-year-old basketball-playing grandma!
50	January 16, 2012	Miranda Cosgrove and the iCarly Cast
Taped at the Maravel Arts Center, NYC in front of an audience full of Rosie's Theater Kids.
51	January 17, 2012	NeNe Leakes
LIVE stream of show on Rosie.com at 4/3c on a smaller, more colorful new set.
52	January 18, 2012	Ricki Lake and the Family Who Saved Rosie
Rosie introduces us to Cara, Daniel, Adam and Charlie- her neighbors who helped her out when she locked herself out of the house- and gives them a huge surprise to thank them for their kindness
53	January 19, 2012	Comedian Kevin Hart... and Rosie Raps
Rosie introduces us to a recently laid-off father named Joe, who also came to her rescue when she locked herself out of the house- and she repays him with a big surprise.
54	January 20, 2012	Anthony Baxter and You've Been Trumped
Plus, meet Rosie's driver, Khary Laurent- driver by day, opera/hip-hop/funk singer by night.
55	January 23, 2012	Joel Grey, Sutton Foster, and the Broadway Cast of Anything Goes
Bobby Pearce stops by to watch Katreese Barnes' musical tribute to his 'dog in a bag', Abby. Final show with studio audience.
56	January 24, 2012	Kathy Griffin Part One
Part 1 of 2. From this show onwards, Rosie and her producers decided not to have a studio audience, in an attempt to conduct one-on-one interviews in a more intimate setting.
57	January 25, 2012	Kathy Griffin Part Two
Part 2 of 2.
58	January 26, 2012	Joe Rogan
59	January 27, 2012	Dr. Oz Part One
Part 1 of 2.
60	January 30, 2012	Dr. Oz Part Two
Part 2 of 2.
61	January 31, 2012	Dermot Mulroney, Stephanie Izard
62	February 1, 2012	Jerry Springer
63	February 2, 2012	Kristin Chenoweth
64	February 3, 2012	Beth Behrs, Traci Lords
Rosie gives a tour of her new set and explains why she decided to change the show's format.
65	February 6, 2012	Suze Orman
Rosie describes her weekend at Super Bowl XLVI in Indianapolis, Indiana.
66	February 7, 2012	Kendra Wilkinson, Hank Baskett
Rosie describes her weekend at Super Bowl XLVI in Indianapolis, Indiana.
67	February 8, 2012	Chelsea Handler
68	February 9, 2012	Ali Wentworth, Ben Clearie
Rosie praises a federal appeals court ruling that Prop 8 was unconstitutional, and expresses her support for Ellen DeGeneres, who's been facing off against a group that doesn't want her to be the JCPenney's spokeswoman because of her sexual orientation.
69	February 10, 2012	Tabatha Coffey, Dakota Goyo, and American Stuffers
Rosie reveals that she has lost 18 lbs since she began making healthier lifestyle choices in November 2011.
70	February 13, 2012	A Tribute to Tony Bennett
Singer Tony Bennett shows Rosie his New York City art studio.
71	February 27, 2012	Dance Moms
Rosie reflects on the headlines that have occurred since she began her two-week vacation, including Whitney Houston's death and the Oscar ceremony.
72	February 28, 2012	Tony Danza, Joe Pantoliano
Rosie talks about raising teenagers and her admiration for nurses, reinforced by two recent trips to the hospital.
73	February 29, 2012	Patti Blagojevich, Chris Errera
Rosie responds to the comments she made about little people on February 8, 2012 during her conversation with Chelsea Handler.
74	March 1, 2012	Teen Moms
Rosie reflects on the death of Davy Jones and shares her views on Republican presidential candidate, Rick Santorum.
75	March 2, 2012	Audra McDonald and Norm Lewis of Broadway's Porgy and Bess
76	March 5, 2012	Rosie Reality Episode 5
Rosie looks back at the hilarious female comedians who've graced her stage—and all the behind-the-scenes action that made the laughs possible! From Molly Shannon's musical stylings to Fran Drescher's pampered Pomeranian, these funny women kept the audience in stitches. Plus, Jenny McCarthy takes cameras on a blind date. Then, meet Jed, The Rosie Show's production attorney, and find out how he prepared for Roseanne Barr's unpredictable humor.
77	March 6, 2012	Sandra Bernhard, Rocco DiSpirito
Rosie shares an original song she wrote about radio host Rush Limbaugh's contraception controversy.
78	March 7, 2012	Star Jones, Urijah Faber
Rosie talks about the changes she has made to her eating habits.
79	March 8, 2012	Wayne Brady, Victoria Gotti
Rosie discusses her weight loss and exercise regime.
80	March 9, 2012	Controversial Newsmakers Nate Phelps, Randy Roberts Potts
Rosie reflects on her experience of being gay in America with producers of her show.
81	March 12, 2012	Liza Minnelli
Rosie talks about her warm weekend spent in Chicago.
82	March 13, 2012	Lance Bass, Ralphie May
83	March 14, 2012	Suzanne Somers
Rosie discusses her wedding plans and reveals that Kirk Cameron has asked her to meet for dinner to discuss his recent remarks about homosexuality. Google Pete takes "The Cinnamon Challenge".
84	March 15, 2012	Debbie Gibson, Jaleel White
Rosie reads a list of things you must do before you turn 50 and finds she has accomplished them already. Rosie and Google Pete discuss "The Cinnamon Challenge".
85	March 16, 2012	Kat Von D, Zachary Knighton, Eamonn McCrystal
Rosie reflects on her love of Chicago and reveals that her parents wanted to name her 'Spring O'Donnell' in honor of her Birthday. She also previews a future interview with good friend, Natasha Lyonne.
86	March 19, 2012	Lily Tomlin
Rosie addresses the cancellation of The Rosie Show and shares her view on the effects of fame on the KONY2012 campaign.
87	March 20, 2012	Bob Harper and Chism Cornelison of The Biggest Loser, Psychic Rebecca Rosen
Rosie talks about her weight loss and allows her production assistant, Caesar Rivera, to read his resume to the audience, in hopes of securing a new job.
88	March 21, 2012	Rosie's 50th Celebrity Birthday Bash with Christine Ebersole
Rosie celebrates her birthday with 50 women who are turning 50 at the Paris Club in Chicago. Celebrity tributes include Crystal Bowersox, Chita Rivera, Mariah Carey, Molly Shannon, Kevin Hart, Ricky Martin, Christine Ebersole and Michael Buffer.
89	March 22, 2012	Mike Tyson
Rosie discusses her wedding plans, including the cake tasting process and decorating decisions she is making with her wedding planner.
90	March 23, 2012	Stephen Baldwin, Rachael Harris
Rosie talks about her love of The Hunger Games book series and her recent trip to see Other Desert Cities on Broadway.
91	March 26, 2012	Natasha Lyonne, Leslie Bibb
Lindsay Feitlinger, senior producer of The Rosie Show, reads her resume to the audience, in hopes of securing a new job.
92	March 27, 2012	Storm Large, Mary Johnson, Nell Casey
Jock Hedblade, producer of The Rosie Show, reads his resume to the audience, in hopes of securing a new job.
93	March 28, 2012	Mackenzie Phillips, Jeff Lewis, Jenni Pulos
Rosie Show staffer Ashley shares her resume with the audience.
94	March 29, 2012	Eva LaRue, Producer Suzanne Taylor, Josh Kelley
Rosie Show staffer Pete Mele shares his resume with the audience. Series Finale, taped on March 20, 2012.
95	Unaired	Bill and Giuliana Rancic, Plain White T's
