= Havoc and Bright Lights =

Studio album by Alanis Morissette
- Released: August 22, 2012
- Recorded: 2011–2012
- Studios: Sunset Sound (Hollywood, California); The Bank (Burbank, California)
- Genre: Soft rock
- Length: 52:41
- Label: Collective Sounds
- Producers: Guy Sigsworth; Joe Chiccarelli

Alanis Morissette chronology
Flavors of Entanglement (2008)	Havoc and Bright Lights (2012)	Live at Montreux 2012 (2013)

Singles from Havoc and Bright Lights
- 1. "Guardian" Released: May 11, 2012; 2. "Lens" Released: July 31, 2012; 3. "Receive" Released: December 3, 2012; 4. "Woman Down" Released: 2012 (Hong Kong); 5. "Big Sur" Released: June 23, 2014

Havoc and Bright Lights is the eighth (and sixth worldwide) studio album by Canadian-American singer-songwriter Alanis Morissette, first released in Japan on August 22, 2012. The album is her first release on Collective Sounds (distributed by Sony worldwide except by Universal in Canada—where Morissette had beem on predecessor MCA—and Japan), and in the US by RED Distribution, and marks her first release away from Maverick Records, her label since 1995. It was produced by Guy Sigsworth and Joe Chiccarelli, the former having produced her previous album, Flavors of Entanglement (2008).

Havoc and Bright Lights received mixed reviews from music critics. Some praised Morissette's softer tones and production, while others found the album overproduced and lyrically weak. The first single released from the album was "Guardian".

== Background ==
In June 2011, Guy Sigsworth, producer of Morissette's Flavors of Entanglement, wrote on Twitter that he was in Los Angeles working with a "certain amazing Canadian lady". On February 28, Morissette shared a video (shot in May 2011) of her recording a song, and Sigsworth's voice behind the scenes made it obvious she was working with him. In May 2011, Morissette shared a song called "Into a King", on the occasion of the one-year anniversary of her marriage, which was co-written with Sigsworth. She also recorded "Magical Child" for the compilation album Every Mother Counts. In November 2011, Morissette appeared on the American Music Awards, saying she had written 31 songs and had to choose the final twelve for the record.

Rolling Stone magazine announced that Morissette's new album would be released in June 2012 and shared the titles of songs "Havoc" and "Celebrity". The magazine also wrote that nearly every tune has a monster chorus. On May 2, Billboard magazine wrote that Morissette's new album would be released on August 28, 2012 through Collective Sounds. The album was distributed by Sony's RED in the States. On May 23, the album became available for pre-order at Amazon.com.

== Promotion ==
In February 2012, Morissette announced a summer European tour to promote Havoc and Bright Lights. Pre-sale started on February 8, while tickets went on sale on February 10. The first show took place Monday, June 25, 2012 in Birmingham. The first three tour dates, all in the United Kingdom, were sold out weeks before the tour started.

=== Singles ===
The album's lead single, "Guardian", was premiered on radio on May 11, 2012 and was made available for digital download on May 15.

"Lens" was released as the second digital single and was made available for download on July 31, 2012.

"Receive" was confirmed as the third single from the album. It was sent to radio airplay on October 12, 2012 in Italy and was released worldwide on December 3, 2012.

According to Morissette's Facebook page in April 2013, a video for her song, "Big Sur" was shot. The song is available on the deluxe edition of the album, exclusively sold through Target Stores.

In May 2013, a music video for the song "Empathy", directed by her drummer Victor Indrizzo, was released through social media.

== Critical reception ==
Professional ratings
Aggregate scores
Source	Rating
Metacritic	55/100
Review scores
Source	Rating
AllMusic	3/5 stars
American Songwriter	3.5/5 stars
The A.V. Club	B−
Consequence of Sound	3/5 stars
The Independent	1/5 stars
NME	1/5 stars
Paste	8.0/10
Rolling Stone	3/5 stars
Slant Magazine	2.5/5 stars
USA Today	2.5/4 stars

Havoc and Bright Lights received mixed reviews from music critics. At Metacritic, which assigns a normalized rating out of 100 to reviews from mainstream critics, the album received an average score of 55, based on 17 reviews, which indicates "mixed or average reviews". Many critics first complimented the album's more mature and warmer sound. Holly Gleason from Paste gave it a positive review. She stated "Twenty years later, the lithe songwriter embraces the same hybrid notion of introspection and sonics that are anything but singer/songwriterly. [Havoc and Bright Lights] embodies relief, release and refuge [...] Without being florid or cosmic, she beckons to a far more graceful, honest world." Sarah Rodman from The Boston Globe praised the album's "crisp, tuneful, warm, and sincere" tone, as well as the production of the album. However, she was critical on the album's songwriting stating that songs "Celebrity" and "Win and Win" were "clunkers". Nick Levine from BBC Music was equally positive saying the album brought out a more "mellow [Alanis] Morissette". However, he was critical on the production saying it was "too slick". Stephen Thomas Erlewine from AllMusic said the album "is as soothing as a Sunday afternoon nap or a warm bath: it's music for when you know you're right where you want to be." At American Songwriter, Eric Allen called the album an "intelligent and inspiring" work that has "winning results". The A.V. Club's Annie Zaleski found "Havoc And Bright Lights remains fearless and vibrant despite its shortcomings." Elysa Gardner of USA Today said that Morissette finally has "found her bliss."

However, the album did receive more scathing outcomes, mainly due to her musical style and her lyrical content, which was about spirituality and motherhood. Jonathan Keefe from Slant Magazine did state that Morissette's changes in music was her "best material", but said "Unfortunately, too many of the songs on Havoc lack that specificity and Morissette's inimitable POV [...] she spends most of the album sounding like she's leading a meditation." Hermione Hoby from The Observer was critical towards the album. She stated "[Alanis Morissette] appears to be very happy and very into motherhood. Which is great for her, but less great for her music." She then said "For the most part these songs are entirely lacking in bite, dragging through limp soft rock and even softer sentiments." Johan Wippsson of Melodic.net felt that Havoc and Bright Lights is "totally over-produced and completely lacks of any kind of soul." Joseph Viney from Sputnikmusic was negative towards the album, criticizing her lyrical content (especially on the song "Celebrity"), and stating that "Not even some admittedly slick production can drag this out of the mire." Hayley Avron from NME gave it 2 out of 10, resembling a negative review. Speaking of track "Woman Down", she said "The only real achievement here is an ironic one, as [...] Alanis somehow manages to make a feminist statement sound like a total affront to womankind" and stated the rest of the album was "teenage poetry, trowelled onto a bed of sift-rock cliché." Simon Price from The Independent gave it a very scathing review, awarding it one star out of five. He criticized the album's softer music and change, saying "Morissette is the sort of woman who does yoga to ensure she can still gaze at her navel" while criticizing her lyrical content, production and her inclusion of a more spiritual and religious tone.

== Commercial performance ==
Havoc and Bright Lights debuted at number five on the US Billboard 200 chart, selling 33,000 copies in its first week. This became her first top five album in the US since 2004's So-Called Chaos and her sixth top ten album in the US overall. The album also debuted at number one on Billboard's Top Rock Albums and Top Independent Albums charts respectively. As of October 2015, the album has sold 92,000 copies in the United States.

Internationally, the album peaked at number one in Canada, Italy, Austria and Switzerland, and at number two in the Netherlands and Germany, where the album was also certified gold for shipments in excess of 100,000 copies.

== Track listing ==
All lyrics are written by Alanis Morissette; all music is composed by Alanis Morissette and Guy Sigsworth.

Standard edition
No.	Title	Producer(s)	Length
1.	"Guardian"	Joe Chiccarelli, Guy Sigsworth	4:18
2.	"Woman Down"	Chiccarelli, Sigsworth	3:36
3.	"'Til You"	Chiccarelli	4:07
4.	"Celebrity"	Chiccarelli, Sigsworth	4:01
5.	"Empathy"	Chiccarelli	4:00
6.	"Lens"	Chiccarelli, Sigsworth	4:08
7.	"Spiral"	Chiccarelli, Sigsworth	4:17
8.	"Numb"	Chiccarelli	4:10
9.	"Havoc"	Chiccarelli, Sigsworth	5:53
10.	"Win and Win"	Chiccarelli	5:01
11.	"Receive"	Chiccarelli	4:28
12.	"Edge of Evolution"	Chiccarelli	4:29
Total length:			52:41

Deluxe edition bonus tracks
No.	Title	Producer(s)	Length
13.	"Will You Be My Girlfriend?"	Chiccarelli, Sigsworth	4:09
14.	"Magical Child"	Chiccarelli, Sigsworth	5:07
Total length:			61:57

iTunes deluxe edition bonus track
No.	Title	Producer(s)	Length
15.	"Jekyll and Hyde" (featuring SoulEye)	Sigsworth	2:43
Total length:			64:40

Target bonus tracks
No.	Title	Producer(s)	Length
13.	"Big Sur"	Chiccarelli, Sigsworth	4:06
14.	"Guru" (featuring SoulEye)	Sigsworth	4:06
15.	"Permission"	Sigsworth	3:42
Total length:			64:35

Amazon bonus track
No.	Title	Producer(s)	Length
13.	"Tantra"	Sigsworth	5:32
Total length:			58:13

Japanese bonus track
No.	Title	Producer(s)	Length
13.	"No"	Sigsworth	4:27
Total length:			57:08

Disc 2 (Live tracks)
No.	Title	Music	Producer(s)	Length
1.	"I Remain" (segue 1)	Morissette	Mike Elizondo	2:49
2.	"Woman Down"	Morissette, Sigsworth	Chiccarelli, Sigsworth	3:32
3.	"You Learn"	Morissette, Glen Ballard	Ballard	4:45
4.	"Guardian"	Morissette, Sigsworth	Chiccarelli, Sigsworth	4:59
5.	"Hands Clean"	Morissette	Morissette	4:48
6.	"Citizen of the Planet"	Morissette, Sigsworth	Sigsworth	4:47
7.	"Ironic"	Morissette, Ballard	Ballard	4:08
8.	"Head over Feet"	Morissette, Ballard	Ballard	4:58
9.	"You Oughta Know"	Morissette, Ballard	Ballard	5:30
10.	"Numb"	Morissette, Sigsworth	Chiccarelli	6:25
11.	"Hand in My Pocket"	Morissette, Ballard	Ballard	5:15
12.	"Uninvited"	Morissette	Morissette, Rob Cavallo	5:59
Total length:				57:55

DVD (Amazon.de Exclusive 3-Disc Premium Edition)
No.	Title	Writer(s)	Length
1.	"You Learn"	Morissette, Ballard
2.	"Guardian"	Morissette, Sigsworth
3.	"Ironic"	Morissette, Ballard
4.	"Head over Feet"	Morissette, Ballard
5.	"You Oughta Know"	Morissette, Ballard
6.	"Numb"	Morissette, Sigsworth
7.	"Hand in My Pocket"	Morissette, Ballard
8.	"Uninvited"	Morissette

- B-sides from the album include "Into A King" and "Naysayers", both fully produced by Guy Sigsworth. "Into A King" was streamed online to commemorate Morissette's wedding anniversary in 2011, and then appeared as a b-side to "Big Sur" in 2014. "Naysayers" surfaced online in 2015.

== Personnel ==
- Alanis Morissette - all vocals
- Matt Chamberlain, Victor Indrizzo - drums
- Victor Indrizzo - percussion
- Paul Bushnell, Sean Hurley - bass
- Jeff Babko, Joe Chiccarelli, Zac Rae, Guy Sigsworth - keyboards
- Chris Elms, David Levita, Tim Pierce, Lyle Workman - electric guitar
- Mike Daly, Chris Elms, Tim Pierce - acoustic guitar
- Joe Chiccarelli, Guy Sigsworth - drum programming
- Chris Elms - additional programming
- David Campbell - woodwind arrangement on "Havoc"
- Lili Haydn - violin on "Numb"

== Charts ==
=== Weekly charts ===
Weekly chart performance for Havoc and Bright Lights
Chart (2012)	Peak position
Australian Albums (ARIA)	22
Austrian Albums (Ö3 Austria)	1
Belgian Albums (Ultratop Flanders)	6
Belgian Albums (Ultratop Wallonia)	5
Canadian Albums (Billboard)	1
Czech Albums (ČNS IFPI)	5
Danish Albums (Hitlisten)	22
Dutch Albums (Album Top 100)	2
Finnish Albums (Suomen virallinen lista)	15
French Albums (SNEP)	20
German Albums (Offizielle Top 100)	2
Hungarian Albums (MAHASZ)	38
Irish Albums (IRMA)	6
Italian Albums (FIMI)	1
Japanese Albums (Oricon)	183
New Zealand Albums (RMNZ)	27
Norwegian Albums (VG-lista)	9
Polish Albums (ZPAV)	11
Portuguese Albums (AFP)	23
Scottish Albums (Official Charts)	20
Spanish Albums (Promusicae)	9
Swedish Albums (Sverigetopplistan)	32
Swiss Albums (Schweizer Hitparade)	1
UK Albums (Official Charts)	12
US Billboard 200	5
US Independent Albums (Billboard)	1
US Top Rock Albums (Billboard)	1

=== Year-end charts ===
Year-end chart performance for Havoc and Bright Lights
Chart (2012)	Position
Austrian Albums (Ö3 Austria)	64
German Albums (Offizielle Top 100)	43
Swiss Albums (Schweizer Hitparade)	85

== Certifications ==
Certifications for Havoc and Bright Lights
Region	Certification	Certified units/sales
Germany (BVMI)	Gold	100,000^{^}
United Kingdom (BPI)	Silver	60,000^{‡}
^{^} Shipments figures based on certification alone.^{‡} Sales+streaming figures based on certification alone.

== Release history ==
Release dates for Havoc and Bright Lights
Region	Date	Format(s)	Label	Edition(s)
Japan	August 22, 2012	CD, digital download	Universal Music Group	
Austria	August 24, 2012	CD, digital download	TBA	
Australia	August 31, 2012	CD, digital download	Sony Music Entertainment	
