= The Rosie Show =

American television series

- Directed by: Sally Jo Conner
- Starring: Rosie O'Donnell
- Country of origin: United States
- Original language: English
- No. of seasons: 1
- No. of episodes: 95 (1 unaired) (list of episodes)

Production
- Executive producers: Rosie O'Donnell; Shane Farley; Jenna Kostelnik
- Production locations: Harpo Studios in Chicago, Illinois
- Running time: 60 minutes
- Production companies: Harpo Studios; KidRo Productions; SantaBu Productions; Oprah Winfrey Network

Original release
- Network: Oprah Winfrey Network
- Release: October 10, 2011 – March 29, 2012

Related
- The Rosie O'Donnell Show; Rosie Live

The Rosie Show is an American evening television talk show starring and produced by Rosie O'Donnell that aired on OWN. The first episode premiered on October 10, 2011, on the stage that was formerly home to The Oprah Winfrey Show at Harpo Studios in Chicago. It was announced on March 6, 2012 that the show would be moving to New York in the near future. On March 16, 2012, OWN announced that The Rosie Show would be canceled after only one season and ninety-four episodes due to low ratings, with the final episode airing on Thursday March 29, 2012.

== Synopsis ==
The show covered current events, highlighted hometown heroes and newsmakers, showcased art, discussed important issues and celebrated children. The daily show also featured comedy and game segments (a staple of Rosie's first talk show) as well as celebrity guests and performances by recording artists, both well-known and up-and-coming performers.

=== Original format ===
The original format was utilized in shows airing between October 10, 2011 and January 23, 2012.

==== Opening ====
Each show opens with Rosie emerging from backstage and welcoming her audience. During the first segment, she combines a free-flow of stand-up comedy, questions from the audience, and a recap of the daily news headlines. Rosie often also uses this time to chat with her show announcer, Hollee Chanel, and the leader of her house band, Katreese Barnes (similar to how she would open The Rosie O'Donnell Show with a conversation with John McDaniel).

As of January 17, 2012, former announcer Chanel has been promoted to special correspondent, working on human interest stories and interviews for various production pieces for the show. Google Pete, a regular on her past XM Radio show Rosie Radio, has taken the role of the new announcer and Rosie uses the opening of her program to chat about the news headlines with Pete and answer viewer questions posted on Twitter.

==== Music ====
The Rosie Show infuses music into every episode- whether it be performances by musical guests, Rosie's spontaneous musical numbers (sometimes accompanied by her "Broadway Boys"), or the soundtrack provided by her house band, led by Katreese Barnes (a former Saturday Night Live musical director). Sometimes special musical guests will sit in and accompany the band.

As of January 17, 2012, Katreese Barnes and the house band are no longer seen on the set on a regular basis. Rosie has stated that Barnes is now working behind the scenes on song parodies for the show.

==== Game show segments ====
Some shows close with a game segment, where audience members face off against each other to win a prize. Game segments have included: The Ro Game, Build That Tune, and Odd Man Out. At the end of the game, the loser is forced to take the "Walk of Shame," while the winner is showered with confetti.

=== One-on-One format ===
January 24, 2012 saw the beginning of a new format for The Rosie Show with Kathy Griffin's One-On-One interview. No longer is there a studio audience or a regular pattern of show segments (opening monologue, guest interview, musical performance, game show, etc.). Instead, Rosie sits across a glass desk from her guest and conducts an in-depth interview that is more serious in tone than her interviews on the show prior to the One-On-One format. O'Donnell has expressed that she enjoys these intimate interviews with no audience and as a result of positive feedback, she continued with One-On-One format until her final show.

=== Rosie Reality: Behind the Scenes ===
Some episodes of The Rosie Show are entitled Rosie Reality, a behind the scenes reality show, similar to The Oprah Winfrey Show's Season 25: Oprah Behind the Scenes. The show presents a backstage look at how Rosie and her crew at Harpo Studios produce episodes of the talk show.

== History ==
The Rosie Show debuted on OWN: Oprah Winfrey Network on Monday, October 10, 2011 at 7:00 p.m. ET. The show led into Oprah's Lifeclass and the pair was considered a reboot for the struggling network to increase viewership during its fall launch of shows.

It was announced on September 29, 2011 that Russell Brand would be the show's first guest. Other guests during Rosie's premiere week included: Wanda Sykes, Gloria Estefan, Roseanne Barr, Lisa Kudrow, Valerie Harper, and Kevin Bacon.

On October 26, 2011, audience member Hollee Chanel was chosen by Rosie to be the new announcer for the show, replacing actress Michelle Blakely. O'Donnell expressed that there would be further changes to the set and format over the show's first few months, as the program finds its vibe during the first season.

On December 6, 2011, Rosie announced on her show that she had recently proposed to her girlfriend, New York-based headhunter Michelle Rounds. The news became a national headline and O'Donnell expressed her surprise at the media's overwhelming response.

On December 9, 2011, Rosie responded to a joke that David Letterman made on The Late Show about her engagement; as part of the joke, Letterman referred to Rosie as a tow truck driver and sports team coach. In response to what she believed was a form of homophobic bullying, O'Donnell shared the top five reasons why she won't appear on The Late Show.

On January 17, 2012, The Rosie Show debuted a brand new set that is smaller, more colorful, and reflective of the host's attempt to establish a more intimate vibe. Rosie says that such changes were completed in just five days and they were inspired by her experience on the set of Bravo's Watch What Happens Live with Andy Cohen. In addition, former announcer Hollee Chanel has been promoted to correspondent, and house band leader Katreese Barnes is now working behind the scenes on song parodies. Google Pete, a regular from Rosie's XM Radio show, is taking the helm as announcer and live tweeter. O'Donnell also addressed controversy sparked by a photo posted online that showed her family catching a hammerhead shark years ago, before they became endangered. Shark enthusiasts and conservationists began an online campaign against the host because of the photo, and Rosie responded with a humorous monologue, which declared her love for animals. This episode was streamed live on Rosie.com at 4/3c.

On January 27, 2012, Rosie revealed in a one-on-one interview with Dr. Oz that her fiancée Michelle Rounds has been seeing a fertility doctor, as the two are planning on having a child together.

On February 8, 2012, in a one-on-one interview with comedian Chelsea Handler, O'Donnell discussed her anxiety surrounding little people, as she said "I'm a little ashamed about it [but] I have a mild fear or anxiety around little people. The problem with me is I can't put the two things together. This is an adult person, a little person ... it's so hard for me." Handler responded with opinions deemed equally or more offensive by many critics. Rosie has since issued numerous public apologies via her Twitter account, including one to Little People, Big World star Amy Roloff, saying "i am sorry my words hurt u and made u sad - they were ineloquently phrased - i apologize and am pained at my own inadequacy." Amy was quick to respond to Rosie's apology by tweeting, "I appreciate that Rosie. Beginning of further great discussions. Many of us in the LP community were taken back. Let's talk more." She later assured the OWN show host in another tweet, "we all do - mess up comment very public & stirred up many memories in many LPs I'm sure. THANK YOU for apology! Much appreciated."

=== Cancellation ===
On Friday March 16, 2012, OWN announced the cancellation of Rosie O'Donnell's five-month-old talk show. The daily show taped its final episode on Tuesday, March 20, 2012, and aired it on Thursday March 29, 2012 in its 7 p.m. time slot.

On Monday March 19, 2012, Rosie addressed the news of the cancellation on her show, saying she has no hard feelings toward OWN for canceling The Rosie Show because it was a "fair" fate for a show she wrongfully presumed would be easy to do. O'Donnell added that the show "started off the wrong way," in that it tried to recreate her syndicated talk show from the '90s. "You can't do that," she said. "There's a quote [from] Lewis Carroll: 'I can't go back to yesterday because I was a different person then.' And that's what I sort of figured out." After she realized that during the Christmas break, O'Donnell said she revamped the show, turning it into a one-on-one interview without an audience, but it was too little too late.

== Reception ==
=== Critical reception ===
The Rosie Show debuted to mixed but generally positive reviews. James Poniewozik of Time Magazine stated that the show "found a happy medium between Serious-Adult Rosie and Showbiz-Kid Rosie, giving her a medium to talk with people she likes about things that matter to her, while keeping positive and showing the live audience a good time."

Alessandra Stanley of The New York Times compared the show to the rest of the OWN programming and remarked that unlike "the solemn, mostly repurposed fare that clutters the rest of OWN, The Rosie Show is colorful and spontaneous: the funny cousin who shows up for a family ceremony late and lets suitcases of clothes, shoes and presents spill out all across the living room floor." Further, the review comments on O'Donnell's "friendly rapport" with guests and compares her fun, easygoing style to Carol Burnett and Merv Griffin. In addition, the reviewer comments on her ability to maintain a fine balance of intimacy and fun when she interviews guests, demonstrated when she "discussed rehab with Mr. [Russell] Brand, a former drug addict, and breast cancer with Ms. [Wanda] Sykes, who caught hers early and is in full recovery. But serious issues don't get in the way of what Ms. O'Donnell does best: amiable, free-floating conversation that seems unscripted and unpretentious."

On the other hand, The Hollywood Reporter said the show was "ramshackle" and "a little crazy" but called it interesting to watch. Variety called it "curiously flat and understated," while the Los Angeles Times said The Rosie Show had a "not-bad, pretty good, kinda funny, sort of smart debut."

=== Ratings ===
The debut of The Rosie Show was seen by 497,000 viewers on OWN: Oprah Winfrey Network. The series was also aired across five other cable channels operated by OWN's partner, Discovery Communications Inc., reaching a combined total audience of 1.5 million.

Overall, an average 388,000 nightly viewers watched The Rosie Show on OWN during the week of its Oct. 10th debut. O'Donnell, Winfrey, and OWN execs have stated that they are happy with the show's premiere week ratings. Further, The Rosie Show posted double digit growth for the month of October across the key demos versus year ago numbers averaging 258,000 total viewers per night (up 81% compared with Discovery Health's ratings in October 2010).

On November 15, 2011 TV Guide described The Rosie Show's shrinking viewership; the show had dropped to an average of only 171,000 nightly viewers overall and 58,000 in the 18-to-49 demo.

On December 14, 2011 The Hollywood Reporter announced that the show had been averaging 244,000 viewers as of Dec. 4, a slight increase over the previous report.

On January 19, 2012 NYPost.com outlined the show's mediocre ratings over the past two weeks- an average of 193,000 viewers tuned in the week ending January 6, 2012, while an even lower average of 150,000 viewers watched Rosie the week ending January 13, 2012.

On March 6, 2012, Variety reported that the show averaged 204,000 viewers in February 2012, which marked an improvement for the show.
