= Ric Frazier =

American photographer

- Born: April 1971 (age 55); Freeport, Texas, U.S.
- Occupation: Photographer

Ric Frazier (born April 1971 in Freeport, Texas) is an American photographer and an advertising director specializing in underwater photography.

He grew up in nearby Lake Jackson, Texas. He graduated in 1996 from Brooks Institute of Photography with a BA in Industrial Scientific Photography and moved to Los Angeles to pursue a career in photography. Ric has been interviewed by many magazines on how he creates his images.

Frazier has done advertising work for corporations such as Kodak, MTV, Hilton, Bayer, Shell Oil, Valspar, Wyeth, Allergan, and GlaxoSmithKline. His photos have appeared in ESPN Magazine, Inc., People, GQ, Outside, Shape Magazine and numerous other publications.

== Videography ==
- 2008 Alanis Morissette - "Underneath"

== Awards ==
- 2007 Communication Arts Photo Annual
- 2007 Applied Arts Photo Annual
- 2007 Elevate Film Festival, Best Music Video Director
- 2007 Underwatercompetition.com Wide-Angle Unrestricted 2007
- 2007 Underwatercompetition.com Video 2007
- 2006 Alternative Pick Awards 2006
- 2005 Marketing Awards 2005
- 2004 Lucie Awards 2004
