= Receive (song) =

Single by Alanis Morissette

from the album Havoc and Bright Lights
- Released: December 3, 2012
- Studio: Sunset Sound (Hollywood, CA); The Bank (Burbank, CA)
- Genre: Rock
- Length: 3:40 (radio version); 4:26 (album version)
- Label: Collective Sounds
- Songwriter(s): Alanis Morissette, Guy Sigsworth
- Producer(s): Joe Chiccarelli

Alanis Morissette singles chronology
"Lens" (2012)	"Receive" (2012)	"Reasons I Drink" (2019)

Music video
- "Receive" on YouTube

"Receive" is a song by Canadian-American recording artist Alanis Morissette, released as the third single from her eighth studio album, Havoc and Bright Lights (2012). The song was written by Morissette and Guy Sigsworth, and produced by Joe Chiccarelli. It is a rock ballad about a relationship in which one person gives more than the other, and the wear it causes to the people involved.

The single was sent to radio airplay on October 12, 2012 in Italy and was released worldwide on December 3, 2012.

== Music video ==
The official music video for "Receive" premiered on December 21, 2012, on YouTube. In the clip, Morissette and people of different ages show that they decided to put yourself first, after not being successful in their respective relationships.

== Track listing ==
- Digital download
1. "Receive" (Radio Version) – 3:40
- EP
1. "Receive" – 4:26
2. "Receive" (Nino Fish Remix) – 6:26
3. "Receive" (Nicole Moudaber Remix) – 10:57
4. "Receive" (Video) – 3:40

== Charts ==
Weekly chart performance for "Receive"
Chart (2012)	Peak position
Belgium (Ultratip Bubbling Under Flanders)	33
Germany (GfK)	73
Italy (Musica e Dischi)	49
