= Guardian (song) =

Single by Alanis Morissette

from the album Havoc and Bright Lights
- B-side: "Lens"
- Released: May 11, 2012
- Studio: Sunset Sound (Hollywood, California); The Bank (Burbank, California)
- Genre: Alternative rock
- Length: 3:27 (radio version); 4:18 (album version)
- Label: Collective Sounds
- Songwriters: Alanis Morissette, Guy Sigsworth
- Producers: Joe Chiccarelli, Guy Sigsworth

Alanis Morissette singles chronology
"Not as We" (2008)	"Guardian" (2012)	"Lens" (2012)

Music video
- "Guardian" on YouTube

"Guardian" is a song by Canadian-American singer Alanis Morissette, released as the lead single from her eighth studio album, Havoc and Bright Lights (2012). The song was written by Morissette and Guy Sigsworth, and produced by Sigsworth and Joe Chiccarelli. It is a rock song, in which Morissette promises to look after a special someone.

Music critics praised the song as fresh and bright. An accompanying music video was released on July 27, 2012, and it shows Morissette singing on a Berlin rooftop equipped with a set of angel wings and eventually brightens the children and parents she is watching over.

The song was a moderate success in some countries, peaking inside the top 20 on the Austrian and Switzerland charts, while reaching number 41 on the Canadian Hot 100 chart and charting on the Billboard's Adult Pop Songs chart. Morissette has promoted the track with live performances, including Dancing with the Stars, The Ellen DeGeneres Show and The View.

== Background and recording ==
After finishing promotion for Flavors of Entanglement and leaving Maverick Records, Morissette got married and gave birth to a son in 2010. She did not give information about writing an album, however she was seen leaving Sunset Sound Recorders in Los Angeles (meanwhile the company listed her as a 2011 client). Finally, in November 2011, Morissette appeared at American Music Awards, where she said she had written 31 songs and would release an album the next summer.

On May 1, 2012, Morissette announced through Facebook she would be making a few big announcements over the next days. The following day Billboard magazine reported Morissette would release her next studio album, Havoc and Bright Lights, on August 28. Billboard also revealed the title of the album's lead single.

Morissette released an official lyric video exclusively through MetroLyrics on May 10. While sharing the lyrics of "Guardian", she wrote: "So excited to share these with you. The greatest offering and aspiration within any relationship, for me, is the willingness to combine protection, commitment, vulnerability, tenacity, tenderness, constancy, empathy, mutuality, intentionality, innocence, presence, courage, freedom-offering and beautiful humanity at the same time. This song speaks to that commitment to both my sweet son, as well as my own inner child".

== Composition ==
"Guardian" was written by Morissette and Guy Sigsworth, while production was handled by Joe Chiccarelli and Sigsworth. The song lasts for 4 minutes and 18 seconds (the radio version being almost a minute shorter). It is a rock song with a standard song structure with heavy guitar/keyboard introduction. The song features a sunny melody highlighted by piano and electric guitar. The song is a celebration of motherhood and it speaks of angels and keepers, wardens and warriors, mixing imagery of care and protection.

== Critical reception ==
Kyle Anderson from Entertainment Weekly's Music Mix wrote that the song "sticks to the loud-quiet-loud alt-rock dynamic, keeping up that trend, and happily also feeling like old-school Alanis." Hermione Hoby wrote for The Observer that "Guardian" is "anthemic and power chord-heavy." Jonathan Keefe wrote for Slant Magazine that the song "boast lyrical hook that is as plainspoken and genuinely lovely as anything she's ever written."

Robert Copsey from Digital Spy wrote that the track is "a light and airy ode to the husband and son she's accumulated in the last four years and told with a Cheshire Cat-like grin that's almost audible by the final chorus." Jody Rosen from Rolling Stone gave the song 3 out of 5 stars, commenting: "Morissette's warble still has the power to peel shingles off rooftops. It is an oath of fidelity, presumably to a lover, but when she begins yowling the chorus – "I'll be your keeper for life as your guardian" – it sounds like a threat." However, Simon Price of The Independent called it "an American Idol fodder, setting the tone for more tedious MOR."

== Chart performance ==
"Guardian" charted highest within countries where it had the most airplay. In Austria, the song debuted at number 38, on the Ö3 Austria Top 40, on July 27, 2012. The following week, the song fell to number 40. However, it jumped to number 14, in its third week, on August 10, 2012. Later, it fell to number 25, however, the song climbed to number 17 the following week, then peaked again at number 11 In Switzerland, it was a success, reaching number 12. In Netherlands, the song has slowly risen on the charts. It debuted at number 87 on the Dutch Top 40 chart, on June 30, 2012. Later, the song climbed to number 74 and peaked at number 70 the following week. After falling to numbers 78 and 80, the song moved again to number 78. However, the song kept fluctuating on the chart for the next three weeks, until it reached number 62, its peak position, so far. in Germany it was also successful reaching number 13 on the singles chart.

In Brazil, the song debuted in the lower parts of the chart, but after accumulating airplay for three weeks, peaked at number 31, becoming another top 40 hit for Morissette in that country.

"Guardian" wasn't successful as her others lead-singles in Canada. Its peak position is her lowest since 1993's "Real World", the third and last single from her second studio album "Now Is the Time" (1992), which peaked at number 85. It debuted at number 65 on the Canadian Hot 100 chart, for the issue dated June 2, 2012, becoming the "Highest Debut" of the week. However, the song dropped out the Canadian chart the following week. After two weeks out of the chart, the song re-entered at number 90, becoming the "Best Comeback" of the week ending June 23, 2012. On July 7, 2012, the song climbed from number 92 to number 78. The song jumped to number 74 the following week, while it reached number 70, on July 21, 2012. "Guardian" kept fluctuating on the chart for the next three weeks, until it reached number 67. On the week ending August 25, 2012, the song climbed to number 64, while on the week ending September 1, 2012, the song climbed to number 63. On the week of Havoc and Bright Lights' release, the song leaped to number 41.

The song debuted at number 37 on the Adult Pop Songs chart. The song has reached number 27, so far. The song wasn't able to chart on the Billboard Hot 100 chart, only reaching number 19 on the Bubbling Under Hot 100 Singles. In Japan, the song rose from number 86 to number 43. In Ireland, the song debuted and peaked at number 51.

== Music video ==
=== Production ===
The official music video for "Guardian" premiered on July 27, 2012, on the New Zealand website 'Stuff'. The clip was filmed in Berlin and features the singer dressed as an angel with a pair of large white-feathered wings. "This video is a tip of the hat to Wim Wenders' Wings of Desire - it is the 25th anniversary of the film having been released," Morissette told Spinner magazine. "I think it really shows how the parent/guardian-angel roles are linked," Morissette says. "How, ultimately, a powerful inner parent calls upon spirit to guide her or his choices on the loved one's behalf, whether it is for a child, a friend, or an inner child. This love and this grace is available to everyone."

"The full circle poetry of my having written 'Uninvited' for its remake, combined with my love of the original movie... my love of Germany, having lived there for three years as a child (by the Black Forest), combined most importantly with how this video is such a visual extension of the song 'Guardian,' which is so close to my heart… it was so much fun to make it in Berlin!."

Morissette sings on a Berlin rooftop equipped with a set of angel wings in the music video.

=== Synopsis ===
The video begins in monochrome with Morissette writing 'I'll be your keeper for life', and then introduces Morissette overlooking the city of Berlin, with a pair of wings attached to her back. We are provided with glimpses of the city beneath; people walking by; and trains going by; all within the public square of Alexanderplatz. A couple with their teenager daughter begins to argue with each other, and the daughter sits by the Alexanderplatz fountain, watching. The mother then leaves the father, and the daughter is left looking helpless towards the sky. During the chorus, with the video now in color, we see a 'normal' Morissette situated in a white abstract room, playing the guitar and singing amongst her new band members. The video cuts to the city yet again, this time with the 'guardian' Morissette looking down upon a boy who is bullied, and is left looking helpless to the sky. The video then switches back to the 'normal' Morissette during the chorus, and yet again to the city; this time with a man hugging goodbye his wife and newborn. The video concludes with the teenage girl, the bullied child, and the mother, looking towards the sky, with the sense of comfort, realizing they have a 'guardian'. Morissette then walks up towards the camera, pleased, and the video fades out with a smile on her face.

== Live performances ==
Morissette performed "Guardian" on March 21, 2012 (along with another new song, "Spiral") during "Guitar Center Sessions with host Nic Harcourt" on DirecTV. She promoted the song on Dancing with the Stars the day the song was released. On May 22, Morissette performed the song on The Ellen DeGeneres Show.

== Track listing ==
- Digital download
1. "Guardian" – 4:18
- CD single
1. "Guardian" – 4:18
2. "Lens" – 4:06
3. "Ironic" (Live in Berlin) – 4:03
4. "You Oughta Know" (Live in Berlin) – 5:10

== Charts and certifications ==
=== Weekly charts ===
Weekly chart performance for "Guardian"
Chart (2012–2013)	Peak position
Austria (Ö3 Austria Top 40)	11
Belgium (Ultratop 50 Flanders)	37
Belgium (Ultratip Bubbling Under Wallonia)	24
Brazil (Billboard Hot 100)	31
Brazil (Billboard Hot Pop)	22
Canada Hot 100 (Billboard)	41
Canada AC (Billboard)	5
Canada Hot AC (Billboard)	22
Germany (GfK)	13
Ireland (IRMA)	51
Italy (FIMI)	19
Italy Airplay (EarOne)	1
Japan Hot 100 (Billboard)	34
Netherlands (Dutch Top 40 Tipparade)	2
Netherlands (Single Top 100)	62
Slovenia (SloTop50)	41
Switzerland (Schweizer Hitparade)	12
US Bubbling Under Hot 100 Singles (Billboard)	19
US Adult Pop Airplay (Billboard)	27
US Rock Digital Song Sales (Billboard)	14

=== Year-end charts ===
Year-end chart performance for "Guardian"
Chart (2012)	Peak position
Germany (Official German Charts)	79
Italy (FIMI)	79
Italy Airplay (EarOne)	8

=== Certifications ===
Certifications for "Guardian"
Region	Certification	Certified units/sales
Germany (BVMI)	Gold	150,000^{‡}
Italy (FIMI)	Gold	15,000^{*}
^{*} Sales figures based on certification alone.^{‡} Sales+streaming figures based on certification alone.

== Radio adds and release history ==
Release dates for "Guardian
Region	Date	Format	Label
United States	May 11, 2012	Radio premiere	Collective Sounds
United States	May 15, 2012	Digital download	Collective Sounds
Canada	May 15, 2012	Digital download	Universal Music Group
Canada	May 15, 2012	Radio premiere	Universal Music Group
Germany	June 15, 2012	Radio premiere	Columbia Records
Hungary	June 15, 2012	Radio premiere	Sony Music Entertainment
Hungary	June 18, 2012	Digital download	Sony Music Entertainment
Germany	June 27, 2012	Digital download	Columbia Records
United Kingdom	July 16, 2012	Radio premiere	Columbia Records
United Kingdom	August 26, 2012	Digital download	Columbia Records
