= Dangerous Muse =

American electronic rock project

Background information
- Origin: New York City, United States
- Genres: Alternative dance, electronic rock, synthpop
- Years active: 2005–present
- Labels: Independent; Previous: Scarce Goods; Sire Records; Warner Music Group
- Members: Mike Furey
- Past members: Tom Napack

Dangerous Muse is an American electronic rock project founded by vocalist Mike Furey and keyboardist, vocalist Tom Napack.

== History ==
Dangerous Muse formed when Mike Furey and Tom Napack met as students at Fordham University, New York City. Furey, a singer-songwriter trained in piano, wanted to experiment with a more electronic sound and Napack, a musician-programmer/guitarist/keyboardist, was looking to collaborate with a lyricist. Their first recording, "The Rejection", caught the attention of record mogul Seymour Stein who offered the duo a demo deal with Sire Records and facilitated their signing to Cordless Recordings, a digital imprint of Warner Music Group. Soon after, the duo signed with former Warner Bros. Records Senior Executive, Craig Kostich of Operational Art, for management.

The Rejection was their debut three-song digital EP. A music video for the lead single aired on MTV/Logo Network and in its second week went to #1 on the countdown. This success rallied significant press coverage for the duo. Highlights include the cover of The Advocate's annual music issue, Perez Hilton's popular blog, and the New York Daily News "Year End Ones to Watch." The song "The Rejection " was on the soundtrack for the film I Now Pronounce You Chuck & Larry. They were featured in the H&M Fashion Against Aids annual campaign along with Katy Perry, Yoko Ono, Robyn and other artists to raise awareness of HIV/AIDS. An exclusive T-shirt designed by Dangerous Muse was sold in stores worldwide and online to support the cause. Dangerous Muse was the band on stage for the film House of Boys. Napack did remixes for artists such as Adam Lambert, Lady Gaga, The Veronicas, Eddie Amador, Crystal Waters, Blush Response and Aesthetic Perfect.

Significant Dangerous Muse performances include direct support for Erasure in The Violet Flame Tour, NewNowNext Awards w/ Lady Gaga (MTV Studios, Times Square), Cornell University and Irving Plaza.

In April 2012, the band officially announced that Napack had left Dangerous Muse to begin his own project, Vanity Police. Dangerous Muse currently performs as a four-piece band with live video art projections by Mojo Video Tech.

In March 2017, the band released their album Electric Eternity.

== Discography ==
=== LPs ===
Year	Album
2017	Electric Eternity: Released: February 28, 2017; Formats: digital download

=== Extended plays ===
Year	Album
2005	The Rejection: Released: November 8, 2005; Formats: digital download
2006	Give Me Danger: Released: August 22, 2006; Re-Release: October 3, 2006{{small|; Formats: digital download

=== Singles ===
Year	Title
2006	"The Rejection": Released: July 4, 2006
2007	"Give Me Danger": Released: November 18, 2008; #11 Billboard Hot Dance Club Play
2009	"I Want It All": Released: December 15, 2009

=== B-Sides ===
Year	Title	A Side
2007	"(Every Day Is) Halloween": Released: October 23, 2007	Give Me Danger

=== Music videos ===
Year	Title
2006	"The Rejection"
2009	"I Want It All"
2014	"Fame Kills"

=== Compilations ===
- I Now Pronounce You Chuck And Larry (soundtrack) (July 20, 2007) "The Rejection"
- Asleep By Dawn Magazine Presents: DJ Ferret's Underground Club Mix #3 (October 30, 2007 Dancing Ferret Discs) "Give Me Danger"
- I Love Montreal : Mixed By Peter Rauhofer (2007) "Give Me Danger (Peter Rauhofer Reconstruction Dub)"

=== Remixes ===
- Tegan and Sara - "Back In Your Head (Dangerous Muse Remix)"
- The Veronicas - "Untouched (Napack - Dangerous Muse Remixes)"
- Alanis Morissette - "Not As We (Dangerous Muse Remix)"
- Lady Gaga - "Bad Romance (Dangerous Muse 'Match in the Gas Tank' Remix)"
- Adam Lambert - "If I Had You (Dangerous Muse Remix)"
