= Underneath (Alanis Morissette song) =

Single by Alanis Morissette

from the album Flavors of Entanglement
- B-side: "20/20"
- Released: April 15, 2008
- Recorded: 2007
- Studio: The Village Recorder (Los Angeles, CA); Frou Frou Central (London, UK)
- Length: 4:10 (Album/Single Version)
- Label: Maverick
- Songwriters: Alanis Morissette; Guy Sigsworth
- Producer: Guy Sigsworth

Alanis Morissette singles chronology
"Crazy" (2005)	"Underneath" (2008)	"In Praise of the Vulnerable Man" (2008)

Music video
- "Underneath" on YouTube

"Underneath" is a song recorded for Alanis Morissette's seventh studio album, Flavors of Entanglement, which was produced by Guy Sigsworth. It is the album's first single. The song was digitally released on April 15, 2008 after originally being scheduled for March 25. According to Morissette, "'Underneath' is about how you can only change the world after you change yourself."

== Music video ==
A music video for "Underneath" was premiered on September 15, 2007 in Los Angeles, as part of the Elevate Film Festival. The video was directed by Matt Docter and Ric Frazier and produced by the Docter Twins. The purpose of the festival was to create documentaries, music videos, narratives and shorts regarding subjects to raise the level of human consciousness on the earth. Morissette submitted the song, and then (as with the other fourteen videos) had the music video written, directed, shot and edited in two days. It was released on the internet in January 2008.

An official music video, directed by Sanji, was released on in May 2008. The video is two parallel stories in which a protagonist (both represented by Morissette) tries to change the world. The first vignette follows Alanis as she attempts to hand out fliers promoting positivity and openness. She is rejected by passers by at each turn. Frustrated, she notices a missed call on her cell phone from an apparent ex-love interest. She angrily texts him, "I said don't call me." Inside her heart, another Alanis (dressed in red), replays scenes of being frustrated with the love interest, keeping her distance in bed and literally pushing him away when he reaches for her.

During the chorus of the song, the real Alanis seems to realize that the grudges she harbors and the attitudes she holds prevent her from making the world a better place. In essence, she realizes that change "starts in [her] living room," and that "what we're doing in [our heart] shows up as bigger symptoms out [in the world]." In accordance with the meaning of the video as a short film, she finds that before she can save the world, she must save herself. She returns home to her apartment, where the walls are covered with hundreds and hundreds of fliers and reminders of the big-picture events she has hypocritically supported without supporting herself. As she tears them off the walls, her heart-bound alias is shown tearing posters off of the heart's walls, but instead of motivational slogans and promises to better the planet, the posters in the heart read, "I'm fat," "I'm lonely," "I avoid taking responsibility," and more. Symbolically, Morissette tears away the personal insecurities that she has hidden under the guise of major world issues.

At the close of the video, the only poster remaining on the wall of her apartment reads, "Save the Earth." As she opens the door and embraces her newly reunited boyfriend, the heart parallel embraces him, too, and the poster reads "Save the Heart."

== Critical reception ==
In January 2008, New York magazine named "Underneath" "the best song we've heard all day", and About.com said the video is "well worth watching and is a great reminder of the talents of Alanis", and that the song's lyrics are "classic Alanis". Blender magazine gave the video two stars, writing, "[the song] features a bunch of weak, tentative and already dated beats—Madonna tried this same strategy (and pulled it off with significant aplomb) exactly 10 years ago. So while her voice sounds even a bit harsher when set against the track's popping, mechanical drums, the video just confuses [...] Not a lot of "comeback of the year" potential here." "Underneath" has been certificated Diamond by ABPD for selling 500,000 digital copies on Brazil. Morissette is the only female artist of all time to have a diamond certificated song in that country.

== Track listings ==
2-track CD-single

1. "Underneath" (album version) - 4:07
2. "20/20" - 4:17

3-track CD-single

1. "Underneath" (album version) - 4:07
2. "20/20" - 4:17
3. "Underneath" (Josh Harris remix) - 7:19

UK/Ireland iTunes Digital Single

1. "Underneath" (album version) - 4:07
2. "Underneath" (Josh Harris remix) - 7:19

US Promotional Remix CD

1. "Underneath" (Josh Harris Remix) - 7:18
2. "Underneath" (Josh Harris Radio Edit) - 3:39
3. "Underneath" (Morgan Page Vox Mix) - 7:45
4. "Underneath" (Morgan Page Mixshow Edit) - 5:20
5. "Underneath" (RedTop Main Mix) - 6:33
6. "Underneath" (RedTop Mix Show Edit) - 4:49

US Digital Promotional Remixes

1. "Underneath" (Josh Harris Club Mix)
2. "Underneath" (Morgan Page Vox Mix)
3. "Underneath" (RedTop Main Mix)
4. "Underneath" (Lost Daze Extended Mix)
5. "Underneath" (John Dahlbäck Remix)
6. "Underneath" (Dave Armstrong & Redroche Remix)
7. "Underneath" (The Whatever/Whatever Remix)
8. "Underneath" (Zoned Out Remix)

Digital Remixes

1. "Underneath" (Dave Armstrong & Redroche Remix)
2. "Underneath" (John Dahlbäck Remix)
3. "Underneath" (Josh Harris Club)
4. "Underneath" (Lost Daze Extended)
5. "Underneath" (Morgan Page Vox Mix)
6. "Underneath" (RedTop Main)
7. "Underneath" (The Whatever/Whatever Remix)

Digital Remix EP

1. "Underneath" (Josh Harris Edit) - 3:39
2. "Underneath" (Morgan Page Radio Edit) - 4:08
3. "Underneath" (RedTop Radio Edit) - 3:40
4. "Underneath" (Lost Daze Radio) - 3:49
5. "Underneath" (John Dahlbäck Remix Edit) - 4:57
6. "Underneath" (Dave Armstrong & Redroche Remix) - 4:52
7. "Underneath" (Zoned Out Remix) - 4:16

As of December 2008, "Underneath" had already sold 76,000 downloads in the US alone, according to Nielsen Soundscan.

== Charts ==
Chart (2008)	Peak position
Austria (Ö3 Austria Top 40)	20
Belgium (Ultratop 50 Flanders)	16
Belgium (Ultratop 50 Wallonia)	17
Canada Hot 100 (Billboard)	15
Canada Hot AC (Billboard)	34
Czech Republic Airplay (ČNS IFPI)	7
Europe (Eurochart Hot 100)	85
Germany (Official German Charts)	46
Italy (FIMI)	8
Japan (Japan Hot 100)	30
Switzerland (Schweizer Hitparade)	16
UK Singles (Official Charts)	99
US Adult Alternative Airplay (Billboard)	17
US Adult Pop Airplay (Billboard)	27
US Dance Club Songs (Billboard)	45

== Certifications ==
Region	Certification	Certified units/sales
Brazil (Pro-Música Brasil)	Diamond	250,000^{*}
^{*} Sales figures based on certification alone.

== Release history ==
Region	Date
United States	April 15, 2008
Europe	May 16, 2008
United Kingdom	May 26, 2008
