= Flavors of Entanglement =

Studio album by Alanis Morissette
- Released: May 30, 2008
- Recorded: 2007–2008
- Studios: The Village Recorder (Los Angeles, California); Frou Frou Central (London)
- Genres: Electronic rock; post-rock; pop rock
- Length: 46:12
- Labels: Maverick; Warner Bros.
- Producer: Guy Sigsworth

Alanis Morissette chronology
The Collection (2005)	Flavors of Entanglement (2008)	Havoc and Bright Lights (2012)

Singles from Flavors of Entanglement
- 1. "Underneath" Released: April 15, 2008; 2. "In Praise of the Vulnerable Man" Released: August 18, 2008 (Europe); 3. "Not as We" Released: October 13, 2008 (US)

Flavors of Entanglement is the seventh studio album, fifth international release and last Maverick Records release by Canadian singer-songwriter Alanis Morissette. The album, which was originally set for an April release, came out on May 30, 2008, in Germany, Benelux, and Ireland, internationally on June 2, and in the United States on June 10. It was produced by Guy Sigsworth. Flavors won Pop Album of the Year prize at the 2009 Juno Awards. The album gets its name from a lyric in the track "Moratorium".

Flavors of Entanglement received generally positive reviews from music critics, praising the new musical style of Morissette's album; however, critics felt the album's lyrics are not as original as Morissette's earlier albums. Charting success of the album was also moderate worldwide. The album peaked at number eight on the US Billboard 200. The album also spawned an American tour called Flavors of Entanglement Tour, which spanned September to November 2008.

Morissette left Maverick Records in 2009, following completion of all promotional activities in support of the album.

== Background and development ==
=== History ===
In March 2005, Morissette said she was ready to begin work on a new album, explaining that she had filled four journals and usually began a new album after filling two—"I'm very pregnant with songs", she said. She mentioned her intentions for the sound of the album in a December 2005 interview to promote The Collection, saying she "would love to fuse the technological sonic landscapes with the more organic ones". In January 2006, Rolling Stone wrote that Morissette was in between "intense" writing sessions for her upcoming studio album, for which she had enlisted multiple collaborators, including Mike Elizondo, who produced her song "Wunderkind" for the soundtrack of the 2005 film The Chronicles of Narnia: The Lion, the Witch and the Wardrobe. Morissette described herself as "teeming with ideas" following the release of So-Called Chaos and stated that she had "more than enough thoughts to congeal together."

In October 2006, Morissette said in an interview with TV Guide that she was going to enter the studio and start writing new material over the next few weeks, saying "at the present, I have seven journals full. I have a lot within me ready to burst out." Morissette released a cover of The Black Eyed Peas' "My Humps" in April 2007, and the high quality of the recording led to speculation among fans that she was in the studio working on an album. She performed at a gig for The Nightwatchman, a.k.a. Tom Morello of Rage Against the Machine, at the Hotel Café in Los Angeles on April 24. There, she said that she and producer Guy Sigsworth had been "sequestered" in London and Los Angeles during the previous few months writing "a bevy of new songs". Accompanied by Sigsworth on piano, Morissette played a new song, "Not as We". Later, the song appeared in the third episode of the fourth season of the television series House, "97 Seconds", which was first aired on October 9.

In August, Sigsworth said in an interview with arbiter.co.uk that 25 songs were written for the album, 13 had been recorded, and eight more were being recorded after Morissette requested B-sides and "exclusives". Sigsworth described Morissette as "a dream to work with" and "totally into my sound world." In the same interview, guitarist and programmer Andy Page said that at one point, they were working on 12 of the tracks simultaneously, and that one contains "moshing, distorted guitars" and a "wall-of-noise" created using Guitar Rig. Page also said that he had used the graphical modular software music studio Reaktor on the album, saying of it that "I prefer using its granulators and weirder signal processors to its synths. Some of its physically modeled stuff is very cool, and there are some cool wavetable synths." An October 2007 interview with Morissette, published on the blog Holons 2.0, reported that the title of the album was Flavors of Entanglement, while noting that no release date had been set. The release date of the album ended up being moved five times.

=== Composition ===
Morissette has noted an expansion of her musical sound on Flavors of Entanglement, and that there are "more technological aspects to it on a sonic level" than previously. She said that because of her love for dancing, the album incorporates beats and loops that enable one to, in her words, "dance your face off". She has described the album as "a combination of everything" in which she has a musical interest, including hip hop beats and organic instruments. Morissette has referred to the album as "techno-sounding but organic" and said, "I like fusion." According to Billboard magazine, the album "balances world- and folk-influenced tracks against the experimental pop leanings of producer Guy Sigsworth".

According to Morissette, the album features a "nice cross-section" of "joy and levity" similar to what is featured on her 2004 album, So-Called Chaos, and "[the] kind of rock bottom, 'Holy shit, I am a broken woman' moment." She said that the album features songs about her own personal relationships, explaining that writing about them is her favourite activity "'cause it's the only thing I can really comment on with any kind of conviction or authority." The album incorporates themes involving both personal and political conflict, and Morissette explained that "Our emotions align themselves with larger symptomatic things in the world. We face a large war out there, but [the album] more closely reflects the war in people's living rooms... the icy silence at home, versus the big cold war." Morissette summarized the track "Moratorium" as being "essentially a song about my readiness to stop repeating bad patterns. I've kicked some of those in my life." She said of "Not as We", "You know how you can resist hitting rock bottom for a long time? That song just goes 'OK, I'm going. All the way down'". "Underneath" is about breakdowns in communication.

== Singles ==
- The first single from the album was "Underneath", released in April 2008. In Canada, the song was a moderate success, peaking at No. 15.
- The second single from the album to be released in Europe was "In Praise of the Vulnerable Man", which failed to chart. No music video was made to promote its release.
- The second and final single to be released in North America was "Not as We". It failed to chart on the Billboard Hot 100, but did make it onto the Bubbling Under Hot 100 singles at No. 22. There was a video shot, which used the radio edit of the song.

== Promotion and touring ==
Morissette and Mutemath opened for the band Matchbox Twenty on their North American tour, a two-month-long excursion that began January 25, 2008, in Hollywood, Florida and ended March 18 in Las Vegas, Nevada. Morissette was confirmed to perform at all the shows except the Verona, New York venue.

In January 2008, Morissette filmed a mini-concert special for A&E, which aired May 18. On March 28, Morissette filmed an eight-song set for Sessions@AOL, an online music program produced by AOL Music. The set appeared online in May. She also appeared on the schedule for the Summer Concert Series for The Today Show. In early 2008, Alanis.com held a contest in which the first 200 e-mail respondents were invited to a private show for Yahoo! Music's "Live Sets" program. In June, Morissette went to Europe and did headlining shows there, then returned to North America for the continuation of her headlining tour in the Fall.

On Tuesday, June 3, 2008, MuchMusic got the rights to stream the entire album online, a full week before its North American release. Morissette performed at the Summerset Music Festival on Prince Edward Island, Canada on September 13, 2008. It was her first performance on PEI. Her North American Flavors of Entanglement Tour began on September 18, 2008, and ended on November 17, 2008. Morissette appeared on the premiere episode of Rosie Live on November 26, followed by radio station holiday concerts, according to her official website and MySpace. In early 2009, Morissette embarked on her Latin American and South American tour. In Brazil, before the show in São Paulo, she appeared on the popular TV show, Domingão do Faustão, and performed some of her biggest hits there, including "Ironic" and the newly released "Underneath". In the United Kingdom, she performed "Underneath" on The Graham Norton Show.

== Critical reception ==
Professional ratings
Aggregate scores
Source	Rating
Metacritic	63/100
Review scores
Source	Rating
AllMusic	3.5/5 stars
Blender	3/5 stars
Consequence of Sound	C+
Entertainment Weekly	B+
The Montreal Gazette	4/5 stars
The Guardian	3/5 stars
Paste	Mixed
PopMatters	6/10
Rolling Stone	3.5/5 stars
Slant Magazine	2.5/5 stars
The New Zealand Herald	4/5 stars
USA Today	1.5/4 stars

Flavors of Entanglement received generally positive reviews from music critics. Stephen Thomas Erlewine from AllMusic awarded the album three-and-a-half stars out of five. He said "filled with songs of heartbreak, anger, and regret, along with a healthy dose of self affirmation – or at least it seems that way, as Alanis' words are harder than ever to parse, a mangled web of garbled syntax, overheated metaphors, and mystifying verbal contortions all requiring too much effort to decode. In that sense, it's a lot like Jagged Little Pill, but musically this is far closer to the muddled mystic worldbeat of Supposed Former Infatuation Junkie, thanks in large part to her collaboration with Guy Sigsworth, best known for his productions with Björk and Madonna." Leah Greenblatt from Entertainment Weekly gave it a B+. She said "Somehow, a devastating personal experience has galvanized her songwriting in a way that domestic bliss, as showcased on 2004's disappointing So-Called Chaos, could not."

However, there have been more mixed reviews from music critics. Paul Schrodt from Slant Magazine gave it two-and-a-half stars out of five. He did praise the album's new musical direction, calling her the "new-age Alanis", but did say that she really hasn't changed from Jagged Little Pill since 1995. The Toronto Star gave the album three stars out of four. They said "The disc includes enough woman-scorned tunes to support that theory, given how the Ottawa-bred singer made her career with confessional songwriting.". Joanna Hunkin from The New Zealand Herald gave the album four stars out of five, saying Morissette's lyric writing was still "awkward" but that the album "is definitely Morissette's best work of this decade."

== Commercial performance ==
Flavors of Entanglement debuted at number eight on the US Billboard 200 selling 71,000 copies in its first week. As of March 2012, the album had sold 233,000 copies in the United States. There have also been 76,000 paid downloads of the debut single, "Underneath", while "Not as We" racked up 38,000 paid downloads.

Outside of the US, the album debuted at number one on the Swiss Albums Chart, making it Morissette's third number one album there, and stayed on the charts for 16 weeks. It debuted at number three on the Austrian Albums Chart, and stayed in the charts for 12 weeks. The album debuted at number 20 on the Belgian Albums Chart (Flanders), later peaking at number eight on its second week, and also peaked at number five on the Belgian Albums Chart (Wallonia). The album debuted at number six on the French Albums Chart, staying in the charts for 16 weeks. It also peaked at number eight in Italy, at number 36 on the Swedish Albums Chart and at number 30 on the Spanish Albums Chart.

The album debuted at number 17 on the Australian Albums Chart, falling to number 33 on its second week before dropping out of the chart. The record stayed a sole week on the New Zealand Albums Chart, peaking at number 35.

As of August 2012, the album has sold over 600,000 worldwide.

== Track listing ==
All lyrics are written by Alanis Morissette; all music is composed by Morissette and Guy Sigsworth.

No.	Title	Length
1.	"Citizen of the Planet"	4:22
2.	"Underneath"	4:07
3.	"Straitjacket"	3:08
4.	"Versions of Violence"	3:36
5.	"Not as We"	4:45
6.	"In Praise of the Vulnerable Man"	4:07
7.	"Moratorium"	5:34
8.	"Torch"	4:49
9.	"Giggling Again for No Reason"	3:48
10.	"Tapes"	4:26
11.	"Incomplete"	3:30
Total length:		46:12

Digital bonus track
No.	Title	Length
12.	"It's a Bitch to Grow Up"	4:03
Total length:		50:15

Japanese bonus track
No.	Title	Length
12.	"20/20"	4:17
Total length:		50:29

Deluxe edition bonus disc
No.	Title	Length
1.	"Orchid"	4:21
2.	"The Guy Who Leaves"	4:12
3.	"Madness"	6:21
4.	"Limbo No More"	5:21
5.	"On the Tequila"	3:42
Total length:		23:57

== Other recorded tracks ==
The following is a list of songs recorded during the same studio sessions that didn't make it onto the album's final track list. Morissette stated that the album would feature 11 tracks, but that the additional songs would eventually be released in other forms, such as in-store exclusives and YouTube music video releases.

1. "I Am"
2. "Wounded Leading Wounded" ^
3. "Asylum" ^^
4. "Break" ^^^
5. "Separate" ^^

^ "Wounded Leading Wounded" was written originally for 2004's So-Called Chaos but was abandoned. Guy Sigsworth and Morissette brought the song out again for their studio sessions.

^^ These songs have never been mentioned by Morissette or Sigsworth, but recently appeared on ASCAP's songfile database credited to Sigsworth and Morissette.

^^^ "Break" appeared as a b-side to "In Praise of the Vulnerable Man".

== Personnel ==
- Alanis Morissette – vocals
- Guy Sigsworth – production, engineering
- Andy Page – guitars, programming, mixing, mastering
- Sean McGhee – programming, engineering, backing vocals
- Andrei Maberley – engineering
- Ben Tolliday – engineering, assistant mastering
- Blair Sinta – drums
- Peter Freeman – bass guitar
- Fiora Cutler – string arrangement

== Charts ==
=== Weekly charts ===
Weekly chart performance for Flavors of Entanglement
Chart (2008)	Peak position
Argentine Albums (CAPIF)	5
Australian Albums (ARIA)	17
Austrian Albums (Ö3 Austria)	3
Belgian Albums (Ultratop Flanders)	5
Belgian Albums (Ultratop Wallonia)	8
Canadian Albums (Billboard)	2
Danish Albums (Hitlisten)	16
Dutch Albums (Album Top 100)	7
French Albums (SNEP)	6
German Albums (Offizielle Top 100)	8
Irish Albums (IRMA)	32
Italian Albums (FIMI)	7
Japanese Albums (Oricon)	58
New Zealand Albums (RMNZ)	35
Norwegian Albums (VG-lista)	12
Portuguese Albums (AFP)	30
Scottish Albums (Official Charts)	30
Spanish Albums (Promusicae)	30
Swedish Albums (Sverigetopplistan)	36
Swiss Albums (Schweizer Hitparade)	1
UK Albums (Official Charts)	15
UK Album Downloads (Official Charts)	7
US Billboard 200	8
US Top Rock Albums (Billboard)	3

=== Year-end charts ===
2008 year-end chart performance for Flavors of Entanglement
Chart (2008)	Position
French Albums (SNEP)	167
Swiss Albums (Schweizer Hitparade)	51

== Certifications ==
Certifications for Flavors of Entanglement
Region	Certification	Certified units/sales
Italy (FIMI)	Gold	35,000^{*}
Switzerland (IFPI Switzerland)	Gold	15,000^{^}
^{*} Sales figures based on certification alone.^{^} Shipments figures based on certification alone.

== See also ==
- Flavors of Entanglement Tour
