= Rosie Live =

- Genre: Variety show
- Developed by: Rosie O'Donnell
- Written by: Seth Rudetsky; Hunter Foster
- Directed by: Richard Jay-Alexander
- Starring: Rosie O'Donnell; Clay Aiken; Alec Baldwin; Jennifer Cody; Harry Connick Jr.; Gloria Estefan; Kathy Griffin; Jane Krakowski; Liza Minnelli; Alanis Morissette; Ne-Yo; Conan O'Brien
- Country of origin: United States
- Original language: English

Production
- Executive producers: David Friedman; Rosie O'Donnell
- Producers: Liza Persky; Alison Sandler
- Camera setup: Single-camera
- Running time: 60 minutes
- Production companies: KidRo Productions; Universal Media Studios

Original release
- Network: NBC
- Release: November 26, 2008

Related
- The Rosie O'Donnell Show; The Rosie Show

Rosie Live is a variety show starring Rosie O'Donnell that aired November 26, 2008 live from New York's Little Shubert Theatre on NBC. It contained singing, dancing, comedy routines and specialty acts. However, poor critical response and ratings doomed the project, and it was unofficially canceled.

== Production ==
The show was produced by Universal Media Studios in association with O'Donnell's KidRo Productions. Rosie O'Donnell and David Friedman were the co-executive producers. The show was broadcast live in accordance with O'Donnell's preference for live programming instead of tape.

== Guests ==
Ne-Yo and Alanis Morissette were the featured singers. Liza Minnelli and Gloria Estefan performed duets with O'Donnell. The Lombard Twins tap danced. Anti-Gravity performed a spinning act. The special also included performances by Rosie's Broadway Kids and guest appearances by Kathy Griffin, Conan O'Brien, Jane Krakowski, Harry Connick, Jr., Clay Aiken, Rachael Ray and Alec Baldwin.

Jennifer Cody appeared in a skit featuring O'Donnell as "Officer Lockstock" and Cody as "Little Sally", a reference to the off-Broadway show Urinetown. (Cody's husband, Hunter Foster, was in the original cast of Urinetown and was on the writing staff for Rosie Live.)

== Reception ==
=== Critical response ===
The show received almost universally negative reviews from critics. The Los Angeles Times critic Mary McNamara wrote, "For those of us who are, and remain, Rosie fans, who think The View will never quite recover from her departure, who think her desire to resurrect the variety show was, and is, a great idea, disappointment does not even begin to describe it." TV Guide critic Matt Roush panned the show as "dead on arrival," while Variety wrote "If Rosie O'Donnell and company were consciously determined to strangle the rebirth of variety shows in the crib, they couldn't have done a better job of it than this pre-holiday turkey."

=== Ratings ===
The program finished in third place in its time slot, ahead of ABC and The CW but behind Fox and CBS.

Episode Number	Episode	Rating	Share	Rating/Share (18-49)	Viewers (millions)	Rank (Night)	Rank (Overall)
1	"Special/Pilot"	3.5	6	1.2/4	5.25	#3	#11

== Cancellation ==
Initial plans were to, if the show had been successful, use the special as a pilot episode for a series of new Rosie Live episodes beginning January 2009, which would have made it the first traditional variety show to air as a regular series in the United States since The Wayne Brady Show in 2001, and the first on NBC since Marie and the infamous Pink Lady and Jeff in 1980. However, Rosie Live did not return due to poor ratings.

== See also ==
- List of television shows notable for negative reception
