= Dyane Harvey-Salaam =

American dancer, choreographer, and teacher

- Born: Schenectady, New York
- Occupations: Choreographer, dancer, assistant artistic director
- Years active: 1968–present
- Notable work: Timbuktu! The Wiz Spell No. 7
- Spouse: Abdel R. Salaam
- Children: 1
- Website: www.forcesofnature.org/team/dyane-harvey

Dyane Harvey–Salaam is an American dancer, choreographer, educator, and performing artist. Harvey-Salaam is a founding member of the Forces of Nature Dance Theatre Company, where she has worked as both performer and assistant to artistic director, husband Abdel R. Salaam. She has also undertaken several collaborations with playwright and poet Ntozake Shange. She was awarded the 2024 BESSIE for Lifetime Achievement in Dance in addition to winning a Bessie Award in 2017 and nominations in 2019 and 2024. As of 2025 she teaches and develops courses in dance and movement studies at Princeton University and Hofstra University.

== Early life and education ==
Harvey–Salaam was born in Schenectady, New York to Audrey P. Harvey.

From a young age, Dyane Harvey–Salaam showed a distinct preference for hands-on learning in dance, opting for intense studio training over traditional academic study. She left home and secured an extended scholarship at Paul Sanasardo's Modern Dance Artists, marking the beginning of her formative New York dance education. Her training was further enriched at the Clark Center for the Performing Arts, where she learned from influential figures like Thelma Hill, James Truitte, and Rod Rodgers.

Harvey–Salaam also pursued studies with Eleo Pomare at his studio and at the inaugural incarnation of the Alvin Ailey American Dance Theater.

== Career ==
Over the course of her career, Harvey–Salaam has appeared as a principal soloist with numerous concert dance companies, including the Eleo Pomare Dance Company, Joan Miller's Dance Players, Chuck Davis Dance Company, Walter Nicks Dance Company, Otis Sallid's New Art Ensemble, George Faison's Universal Dance Experience, Dance Brazil, and the Repertory Dance Theatre of Trinidad and Tobago.

She is a founding member of the Forces of Nature Dance Theatre Company, where she has worked as both performer and assistant to artistic director Abdel R. Salaam. Known for its synthesis of African and Afro-diasporic traditions, the company integrates ballet, modern dance, and hip-hop dance to create works rooted in spirituality, ritual, and community.

Harvey–Salaam was assistant to choreographer Otis Sallid for Spike Lee's School Daze (1988) She featured as a dancer in Syvilla: They Dance to Her Drum (1979), and in Maurice Hines: Bring Them Back (2019).

=== Work with Ntozake Shange ===
Her work has included collaborations with playwright and author Ntozake Shange. She worked with Shange on A Photograph: Lovers-in-Motion (1977), and was an original cast member in the 1979 Shange production Boogie Woogie Landscapes. Harvey was an original cast member and performer in the production of Shange's 1979 choreopoem Spell No. 7. She choreographed Shange's dance piece "Hydraulics Phat Like Mean" in the 1998 presentation Love's Fire, which was presented by the Barbican Centre in London, before transferring to the Joseph Papp Public Theatre Off Broadway.

Harvey–Salaam served as the movement director/choreographer for a production of Ntozake Shange's work at the Black Theatre Festival in Winston-Salem, North Carolina, in 2015.

At the book launch for Shange's bilingual collection of poems, Wild Beauty in 2017, Harvey performed a dance.

Shange's posthumously published book, Dance We Do: A Poet Explores Black Dance (2020), which explores Black dance history, includes an interview with Harvey, and mentions her among the influential dancers Shange worked with and was inspired by.

== Other activities ==
Harvey–Salaam is a member of the faculty at Princeton University and Hofstra University, where she teaches and develops courses in dance and movement studies.

Harvey–Salaam is a certified Pilates instructor, and serves on the board of the American Dance Guild.

She is the author of "Making Movement as an Act of Listening, Riding with the Muse," published in a College Language Association Journal (CLAJ) special edition dedicated to the legacy of Ntozake Shange in 2019.

== Awards and recognition ==
Harvey–Salaam has earned awards for both her choreographic and performance contributions. As a choreographer, she earned AUDELCO Awards for Oya the Dance Drama and Great Men of Gospel. Her choreography in Debra Ann Byrd's Becoming Othello: A Black Girl's Journey was critically acclaimed, receiving both the United Solo Award and the Broadway Berkshire Award. Her profound influence in dance has also been recognized with the A.I.R. Living Legends Award from Miami Dade Community College, alongside the Distinguished Woman Award from both the Harlem Arts Alliance and the Harlem Chamber of Commerce.

In the realm of performance, she won a 2017 BESSIE for her performance in Dance Africa's/Abdel R. Salaam's 'Outstanding Production of the Year'.. She garnered a 2019 BESSIE nomination for her role in the revival of Eleo Pomare's HEX.

In 2024 Harvey–Salaam was awarded a BESSIE for Lifetime Achievement in Dance and a BESSIE nomination for her acclaimed performance in Sydnie L. Mosley's choreopoem, Purple: A Ritual in Nine Spells, staged at the Clark Theater at Lincoln Center.

Additional honors celebrating her impact include the Woman of Distinction Award, the Walk A Mile In Her Shoes Award from the Hempstead African-American Museum, and the Dance for Life Award from Better Family Life. She also holds the Monarch Merit Award, the Black Theatre Award, and the Goddesses and Gurus Award.

Her career and contributions have been documented by the Jerome Robbins Dance Division of the New York Public Library for the Performing Arts, including an Oral History Project interview and a feature in The Dance Historian Is In video series.

== Personal life ==
She married Abdel R. Salaam, and they have one child.

== Selected works ==
Her commercial and theatrical credits include performances in:

- The Wiz (Broadway and the film)
- Timbuktu!
- Ti Jean and His Brothers
- The Great Mac Daddy
- The Juju Man
- Your Arms Too Short to Box With God (Paris production)

She also appeared in televised specials such as:

- Ailey Celebrates Ellington (CBS)
- Free To Dance (PBS)

In 2023, she performed as a guest artist in Sydnie L. Mosely's Purple: A Ritual in 9 Spells at Lincoln Center.

== See also ==
- Abdel R. Salaam
- Choreopoem
- Dianne McIntyre
- Eleo Pomare
- George Faison
- Joan Miller
- Ntozake Shange
