= Halifu Osumare =

American choreographer and dance scholar

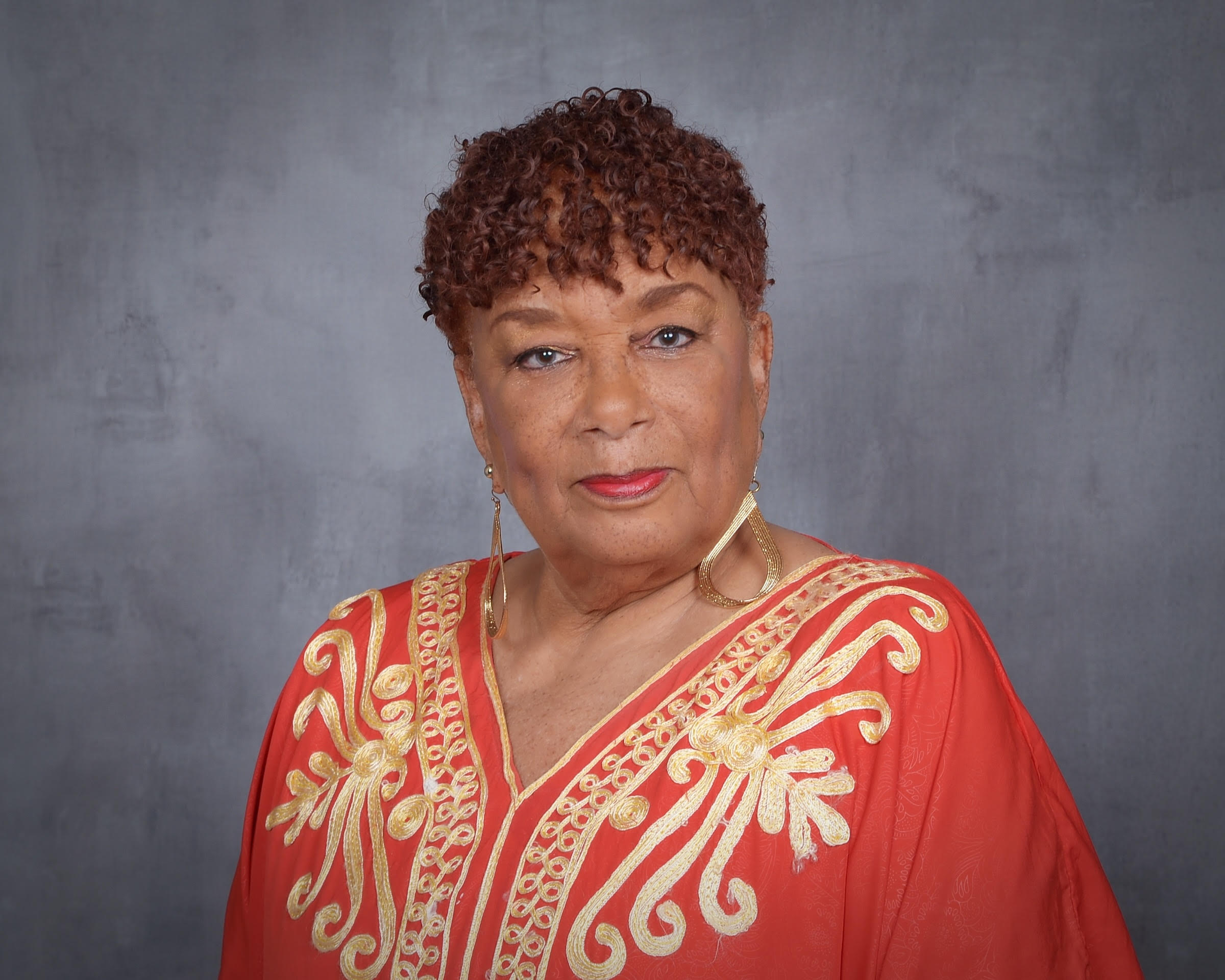
- Osumare in 2025
- Born: Janis Miller; November 27, 1946 (age 79); Galveston, Texas, U.S.
- Education: M.A. in Dance Ethnology, San Francisco State University; PhD in American Studies, University of Hawaiʻi at Mānoa
- Occupations: Author, educator, dancer, choreographer, cultural activist, scholar
- Employer: University of California, Davis
- Known for: Work in global hip-hop studies and Dunham Technique
- Notable work: The Hiplife in Ghana, Dancing in Blackness, The Africanist Aesthetic in Global Hip-Hop
- Awards: American Book Award, Fulbright Fellowship, Dance Studies Association Award

Halifu Osumare (born November 27, 1946) is an African American author, educator, dancer, choreographer, cultural activist, and scholar involved in dance and black popular culture internationally for over fifty years. She is a UC Davis professor emerita of African American and African studies and was the Director of AAS from 2011 to 2014. She is recognized for her global hip-hop studies books and her contributions to bringing attention to the impact African culture has had on U.S. popular culture and around the world. She is also a protégé of the late dancer-anthropologist Katherine Dunham and a certified instructor of Dunham Dance Technique.

Osumare has served on review panels for the California Arts Council, National Endowment for the Arts, The Pew Center for Arts & Heritage, and the Haas Creative Fund.

== Early life and education ==
Osumare was born Janis Miller in Galveston, Texas. She earned an MA in Dance ethnology from San Francisco State University and a PhD in American studies from the University of Hawaiʻi at Mānoa. In 2008, she was a Fulbright Scholar at the University of Ghana, Legon, where she taught in the Department of Dance Studies and conducted research on hip-hop culture in Accra.

While at San Francisco State University, she became involved with the Black Arts Movement, which influenced her approach to dance as a form of activism. She later spent three years in Europe, working, teaching, and performing in cities including Barcelona, Paris, Amsterdam, Copenhagen, and Stockholm. After returning to the United States, she continued her choreographic work in Boston and later moved to New York to perform with Rod Rodgers Dance Company. In 1973, she relocated to Oakland, where playwright Ntozake Shange gave her the name Halifu Osumare. During this period, she developed The Evolution of Black Dance, a performance-lecture that she presented in various formats over the years.

Osumare collaborated with Shange in dance-poetry improvisations that contributed to the early development of For Colored Girls Who Have Considered Suicide / When the Rainbow Is Enuf. She was active in the West Coast Black Arts Movement during the 1970s. After a period studying dance in Ghana, she returned to Oakland and co-founded Everybody's Creative Arts Center (later Malonga Casquelourd Center for the Arts), focusing on arts education and administration.

Her later work included participation in the 1983 Dance Black America festival organized by the Brooklyn Academy of Music, coordinating the Katherine Dunham Residency at Stanford University, and serving as a dance consultant to the United States Information Agency, which included work with the Kwacha Cultural Troupe in Malawi.

== Career ==
=== Author ===
Osumare is the author of four books. The Hiplife in Ghana: West African Indigenization of Hip-Hop (2012) examines the evolution of hiplife, a Ghanaian music genre blending hip-hop and highlife. The book explores the genre's development as a localized adaptation of hip-hop culture and its broader cultural impact.

Her earlier work, The Africanist Aesthetic in Global Hip-Hop: Power Moves (2007), discusses hip-hop as a global cultural form and introduces the concept of "connective marginalities" to explain its global resonance. The book includes case studies from the United Kingdom, France, Russia, Japan, and Hawaiʻi.

Osumare's first memoir, Dancing in Blackness: A Memoir (2018), recounts her four-decade career in dance across three continents. It received the Selma Jeanne Cohen Prize in Dance Aesthetics and the American Book Award in 2019. Her second memoir, Dancing the Afrofuture: Hula, Hip-Hop and the Dunham Legacy (2024), continues her narrative from the 1990s onward, exploring Afrofuturism in dance and Black cultural expression.

In addition to her books, Osumare has written refereed scholarly journal articles and book chapters on hip-hop, African American dance, Black choreographers, and the work of Katherine Dunham.

=== Artist and dance activist ===
In the 1970s, Osumare was a soloist with the Rod Rodgers Dance Company in New York. From 1989 to 1995, she led Black Choreographers Moving Toward the 21st Century, a multi-city initiative promoting underrepresented Black choreographers. She also served as co-director of the Institute for Dunham Technique Certification.

=== Choreographer ===
Osumare has directed and choreographed theatrical works by Ntozake Shange, including productions of For Colored Girls Who Have Considered Suicide / When the Rainbow Is Enuf, From Okra to Greens, Spell No. 7, and Boogie Woogie Landscape. Her choreography credits also include work for the American Conservatory Theater in San Francisco, such as Miss Evers' Boys (1988), Joe Turner's Come and Gone (1989), and Pecong (1993), for which she received a Bay Area Drama Critics Circle Award.

Following her retirement from UC Davis in 2016, Osumare choreographed in the Eye of the Storm and Resistance/Resilience (2019), the latter produced by Sacramento State University in response to contemporary civil rights issues.

== Awards and recognition ==
- Edward A. Dickson Emeriti Professorship Award, UC Davis (2021–2024)
- Distinction in Dance Award, Dance Studies Association (2020)
- American Book Award, Before Columbus Foundation (2019)
- Selma Jeanne Cohen Prize in Dance Aesthetics, American Society for Aesthetics (2019)
- Scholars Award, International Association of Blacks in Dance (2018)
- Harry Shaw Award, Popular Culture Association, African American Culture Area (2016)
- Fulbright Fellowship, Lecturer-Researcher in Ghana (2008)
