= Lost in language & sound =

2011 book of essays by Ntozake Shange

lost in language & sound: or how i found my way to the arts: essays
- Cover of lost in language & sound
- Author: Ntozake Shange
- Language: English
- Genre: Essays
- Published: 2011 (St. Martin's Press)
- Publication place: United States
- Media type: Print (hardback & paperback)
- Pages: 160 pages
- ISBN: 978-0-312-20616-1
- OCLC: 707969664

lost in language & sound: or how i found my way to the arts: essays (2011) is a collection of 25 personal essays written by Ntozake Shange. Explored in the collection are topics such as racism, sexism, jazz, dance, and writing. The essays function as autobiography, music and literary criticism, and social critique. While some pieces were written specifically for the collection, many were written over the span of over 30 years.

In February 2011, the essay "why i had to dance//" was staged as a choreopoem at Oberlin College. Shange's long-time collaborator, Dianne McIntyre, choreographed and directed the piece.

== Style ==
Many of the essays are written in Shange's recognizable style that includes idiosyncratic spelling, lack of capitalization, and unconventional punctuation. For example, throughout the essays Shange replaces "with" with "wit" or "and" with "n." Shange describes her motivations for defying conventional spelling and grammar rules in the essay "my pen is my machete." She writes about her desire to "attack deform n maim the language that i was taught to hate myself in/ the language that perpetuates the notions that cause pain to every black child as s/he learns to speak of the world."

== Themes ==
=== Music and dance ===
A number of the essays are focused on the topics of dance and music. In "why i had to dance//" she describes her childhood exposure to dance through Busby Berkeley musicals, her parents' passion for dance, and her exposure to the dances of Latin America. She describes her experiences as a dancer and the centrality of dance and movement to her artistic project. In "2 live crew," Shange critiques misogynistic rap lyrics, rappers, and black male intellectuals who come to their defense. She claims that the lyrics foster attitudes that lead to violence against black women. Shange also writes about the artists she knows and has worked with closely, such as Dianne McIntyre.

== Reception ==
lost in language & sound was met with reviews, that while small in number, were largely positive and praised the work for its emotional impact. Kirkus Reviews called the collection of essays "uneven but emotional, grateful and often wise." A review from the Dallas Morning News describes the collection as full of "poignant richness" and Publishers Weekly described it as "profoundly personal yet all-encompassing exploration of words, movement, and the state of race in America."

== List of poems ==
- from analphabetic to script obsessed
- a history : for colored girls who have considered suicide/ when the rainbow is enuf
- unrecovered losses/ black theater traditions
- my pen is a machete
- takin' a solo/ a poetic possibility/ a poetic imperative
- how I moved anna fierling to the southwest territories or my personal victory over the armies of western civilization
- getting where I haveta be/ the nature of collaboration in recent works
- why i had to dance//
- movement/ melody/ muscle/ meaning/ mcintyre
- did i hear the congregation say amen?
- a celebration of black survival/ black dance america/ brooklyn academy of music/ April 21–24, 1983
- bang on!
- 2 live crew
- the couch
- the dark room
- dear daddy, "el amor que tu me das--"
- ellie, who is my mother
- on silk
- in search of a home
- however you come to me
- mr. wrong
- justice
- porque tu no m'entrende? whatcha mean you can't understand me?
- letter to a young poet
- first love

== See also ==
Ntozake Shange
