= Mollie Taylor Stevenson Jr. =

Mollie Taylor Stevenson Scott (aka Mollie Taylor Stevenson Jr.; born 1946), a former model, is the daughter of Benjamin Franklin "Big Ben" Stevenson (a football star at Tuskegee Institute) and Mollie (née Taylor) Stevenson (1911-2003). Mollie Jr. and her mother were the first living African-American women inducted into the National Cowgirl Museum and Hall of Fame. She and her husband, Elicious Scott Jr., taught and connected children and adults with Western culture and agriculture.

She received the Chester A. Reynolds Memorial Award, one of only two women to have received the honor; the other being Connie Douglas Reeves. Mollie Jr. founded the American Cowboy Museum which is located on the Taylor-Stevenson Ranch, an historic working ranch located near Houston, originally purchased in 1875 by her great-grandfather, Edward Ruthven Taylor. The ranch is among the oldest African American-owned ranches in the United States.

== Education and volunteer work ==
Mollie Jr. graduated from Houston's Jack Yates High School in 1963, and attended Texas Southern University for four years pursuing a business major. She worked as a model for fifteen years, and managed her schedule to allow time for volunteer work with "the black trail riding and rodeo associations, the Houston Livestock Show and Rodeo and the Black Landowners Association". She has been interviewed on radio and TV, for newspapers, and for magazines including Texas Highways, Ebony, and Essence, having been portrayed as "a woman in a nontraditional occupation". Mollie is also a charter member of the Speakers and Black Go Texan Committee, the Houston Livestock Show & Rodeo, the Professional Black Cowboy & Cowgirl Association, the Landowners of Texas, and the Diamond L Riding & Roping Club.

== Ranch life ==
Mollie and her family manage a ranch with horses, cattle, hay production and oil. She often organizes the tours held at the ranch for children to be able to communicate with various ranch animals.

The American Cowboy Museum was opened on her family's Texas ranch before Texas schools were racially integrated, in order to give African-American children to give them a taste of ranch life and to acquaint the public with the role that has been played by blacks, Hispanics, Native Americans, and women in the West history.
