= Joan Miller =

Joan Miller may refer to:

- Joan Miller (ophthalmologist), Canadian-American ophthalmologist and scientist
- Joan Miller (choreographer), American dancer, choreographer, and educator
- Joan Miller Lipsky, American attorney and politician
- Joan Miller (actress), Canadian actress
- Joan Copeland (born Joan Maxine Miller), American actress
