= DanceAfrica =

DanceAfrica is a heritage and community celebration equable on the manifold dance forms of the African Diaspora held annually in New York City, Washington, DC, and Chicago. Included are indoor and outdoor performance including live music, a film series, master classes, education programs, and an outdoor bazaar. Its current artistic director is Abdel R. Salaam.

== DanceAfrica NYC ==
=== History ===
The political movements in the 1960s and the growth of dance in the 1970s led to the development of a number of African American dance companies. The celebration DanceAfrica, created by Chuck Davis, built on the momentum of those 1960s and 70s movements through its showcase of African and African-American traditions and art forms. In the 1940s and 1950s, an African American cultural awareness emerged, seen in performances by Pearl Primus and Katherine Dunham at BAM, the dance focus was shifted from entertainment toward modern dance while integrating African elements. In the 1960s, Alvin Ailey, Talley Beatty, and Donald McKayle appeared at BAM. These artists were based at the Harlem Cultural Center with the New Dance Group when Chuck Davis arrived in the early 1960s. Davis moved to New York City to perform with musician Babatunde Olatunji; he also studied Dunham technique and jazz with Syvilla Fort. In 1967 Davis formed the Chuck Davis Dance Company at the South Bronx Community Action Theatre, later moved to Bronx Community College.

In February 1977, the Chuck Davis Dance Company performed in a constructed African village in the BAM Lepercq Space. Based on the success of the engagement, DanceAfrica debuted the following spring, beginning with a day-long African bazaar. Arthur Hall, Charles Moore, Chuck Davis, Dinizulu, and the International Afrikan American Ballet participated in the festival, which offered five performances in the BAM Playhouse and culminated with all five companies—approximately 70 performers—on the Opera House stage. A festival was born, growing into the country's largest annual celebration of African and African American dance and adding dates in other cities, including Chicago, Washington, DC, Los Angeles, Miami, Minneapolis, Philadelphia, Pittsburgh, and many others. Dallas recently made the festival an annual event. DanceAfrica is BAM’s longest-running performance series—and has become a Memorial Day weekend tradition in Brooklyn. Weddings, christenings, and other ceremonies have taken place during DanceAfrica—transcending performance and becoming ritual—a community’s celebration of African identity. Rennie Harris is also a choreographer.

In the 1980s, Chuck Davis added master classes in African movement and music. DanceAfrica 1993 opened with a motorcade procession from Harlem to the steps of BAM. Fifty-two members of the Imperial Bikers Motorcycle Club, each carrying the flag of an African country, were joined by the Council of Elders, artists, and dignitaries for a libation pouring ceremony that included a gigantic carrot cake baked in the shape of Africa. The 20th Anniversary Celebration in 1997 debuted the BAM/Restoration DanceAfrica Ensemble, a collaboration between BAM and the Bedford Stuyvesant Restoration Corporation’s Youth Arts Academy that has become an annual crowd favorite.

DanceAfrica has showcased troupes based both in Africa and the African Diaspora, including many from New York. Companies have ranged in style from indigenous African to urban American hip-hop. DanceAfrica has shown that “traditional” African dance is not fixed in time and remains inclusive and diverse, showcasing African influences in contemporary choreography.

In 2007, DanceAfrica celebrated its 30th festival with 30 Years of DanceAfrica: Remember! Honor! Respect! An African Dance Odyssey, and marks another milestone—its founder Baba Chuck Davis’ 70th birthday.

=== Performance history ===
2007 30 Years of DanceAfrica: Remember! Honor! Respect! An African Dance Odyssey

Bambara Drum and Dance Ensemble
Forces of Nature Dance Theatre Company
Kulu Mele African-American Dance Ensemble
Ndere Troupe
Sabar Ak Ru Afriq Dance Theatre
BAM/Restoration DanceAfrica Ensemble

2006 Legacy: African Dance in Our World
Creative Outlet Dance Theatre of Brooklyn
Perú Negro
Universal African Dance and Drum Ensemble
BAM/Restoration DanceAfrica Ensemble

2005 Rhythmic Heritage: Going Full Circle
Asase Yaa African-American Dance Theatre
L’ACADCO—A United Caribbean Dance Force
Mamadou Dahoué and the Ancestral Messengers Dance Company
BAM/Restoration DanceAfrica Ensemble

2004 A Dancers's path: Ancient Traditions, Modern Trends
The Bambara Drum and Dance Ensemble
Ezibu Muntu African Dance Company
Nii Tettey Tetteh and the Kusun Ensemble
Shaka Zulu, guest artist
BAM/Restoration Dancefrica Ensemble and Kusun Atsiagbekor

2003 Rhythmic Rites and Rituals: Connecting Cultural Borders
Kulu Mele African-American Dance Ensemble
Muntu Dance Theatre
Resurrection Dance Theatre of Haiti
BAM/Restoration DanceAfrica Ensemble

2002 25 Years of DanceAfrica: Africa, My Africa
Ballet Folclorico Cutumba
Chuck Davis Dance Company
Charles Moore Dance Theatre
Forces of Nature Dance Theatre Company
Rennie Harris PureMovement
LaRocque Bey School of Dance
Creative Outlet Dance Theatre of Brooklyn
Universal African Dance and Drum Ensemble
BAM/Restoration DanceAfrica Ensemble

2001 Rhythms from the Circle of Life
Forces of Nature Dance Theatre Company
Sabar Ak Ru Afriq Dance Theatre
Ndere Troupe
BAM/Restoration DanceAfrica Ensemble

2000 Cultural Connections
Djoulé African
Génies Noirs
Rennie Harris PureMovement
BAM/Restoration DanceAfrica Ensemble

1999 Hear the Movement See the Rhythm
Ballethnic Dance Company
Mizizi
Ishangi African Dancers
BAM/Restoration DanceAfrica Ensemble

1998 African Roots in American Soil: Male Rites of Passage
Mask Dance Company featuring Mamadou Dahoué
Sankofa Dance Company
IWISA Music and Dance Company
BAM/Restoration DanceAfrica Ensemble

1997 DanceAfrica ’97: 20th Anniversary Celebration
African-American Dance Ensemble
Bokandéye African-American Dance Theatre
Calabash Dance Theatre
The Chakaba
Charles Moore Dance Theatre
Chuck Davis Dance Company
Dinizulu African Dancers, Drummers & Singers
Djembe Orchestra
Djoulé African
Forces of Nature Dance Theatre Company
LaRocque Bey Dance Company
Marie Brooks Pan-Caribbean Dancers
Mask dance Company
Moving with the Spirit
Nile Ethiopian Ensemble
N’Tore
PAKA’ Dance Company
Rennie Harris PureMovement
Restoration Student Dance Ensemble
Roots of Brazil
Sabar Ak Ru Afriq Dance Theatre
Women of the Calabash

1996 Rites of Passage: Celebrating Women of the African Diaspora
Rennie Harris PureMovement
Women of the Calabash
Nile Ethiopian Ensemble
Bokandéye African-American Dance Theatre

1995 Honor the Source—Africa the Motherland
Dinizulu African Dancers, Drummers & Singers
Roots of Brazil
Paká Dance Company
Djoulé African
Rennie Harris PureMovement

1994 Year of the Child
Les Guirivoires
Marie Brooks Pan-Caribbean Dancers
Moving with the Spirit
TriShades of Gold
Djoulé African

1993 DanceAfrica 1993 Sweet 16!
Dinizulu African Dancers, Drummers & Singers
Charles Moore Dance Theatre
A Touch of Folklore and More
Maimuna Keita School of African Dance
Djimo Kouyate
African Heritage Drummers and Dancers
Malaki Ma Kongo
Kairaba West African Dance Company
LaRocque Bey Dance Company
Sabar Ak Ru Afriq Dance Company
Calabash Dance Theatre
Bradley Simmons and the Dance Africa Djembe Orchestra
Forces of Nature Dance Theatre Company
International African Islamic Ballet
Kan Kouran Dance Company
Chuck Davis Dance Company
Women of the Calabash
Ntore Dancers
Art of Black Dance And Music
DanceBrazil
African-American Dance Ensemble
Kutero and the DanceAfrica Djembe Orchestra
Baba Ishangi

1992 The Glory of African Dance: A Cultural Jubilee
International African Islamic Ballet
Kairaba West African Dance Company
LaRocque Bey Dance Company
Malaki Ma Kongo
Alyo Children's Dance Theatre
A Touch of Folklore and More

1991 The Griot's Corner
African-American Dance Ensemble
Forces of Nature Dance Theatre Company
Ladygourd Sangoma
A Touch of Folklore and More

1990
Dinizulu African Dancers, Drummers & Singers
Forces of Nature Dance Theatre Company with guest artists Thunderbird American Indian Dancers
Magic Dancers of Zaire

1989 The Language of the Drum, The Movement of Dance, The African Beat Creates Dance
Les Guirivoires
M.F.O.A. Message from Our Ancestors
Muntu Dance Theatre

1988 Today's Rhythms, Drums Toward the Future, Reflections of Africa
Urban Bush Women
Les Guirivoires
Sabar Ak Ru Afriq Dance Theatre

1987 Under the Baobab Tree: The Honoring of the Elders
The African-American Dance Ensemble
Calabash Dance Theatre
Dinizulu African Dancers, Drummers & Singers
Arthur Hall Afro-American Dance Ensemble
Kan Kouran Dance Company
Charles Moore Dance Company
Sabar Ak Ru Afriq Dance Theatre
Women of the Calabash
Djimo Kouyate

1986 The Legacy: Celebration of Motherhood
Chuck Davis Dance Company
Calabash Dance Theatre
Forces of Nature Dance Theatre Company
Kan Kouran Dance Company
Odadaa! International Dance Company
Sabar Ak Ru Afriq Dance Theatre

1985 The Grand Celebration
Ko-thi Dance Company
Arthur Hall Afro-American Dance Ensemble
International Afrikan American Ballet
Bernice Johnson Dance Company
Chuck Davis Dance Company
Muntu Dance Theatre
Charles Moore Dance Theatre
Izulu Dance Theatre
Art of Black Dance and Music
Dinizulu African Dancers, Drummers & Singers
Sabar Ak Ru Afriq Dance Theatre
A Touch of Folklore and More
Calabash Dance Theatre
Women of the Calabash

1984
Bucket Dance Theatre
Afro-Brazilian Dance Company
Melvin Deal's African Heritage Dance Society
Dinizulu African Dancers, Drummers & Singers
Charles Moore Dance Theatre
International Afrikan American Ballet
Women of the Calabash

1983 6th Big Season
Dinizulu African Dancers, Drummers & Singers
International Afrikan American Ballet
Izulu Dance Theatre
Art of Black Dance and Music
Chief Bey
Calabash Dance Theatre
Women of the Calabash
A Touch of Folklore and More
dancers from the Bernice Johnson Cultural Arts Center

1982 DanceAfrica 82
Muntu Dance Theatre
Ladji Camara
Charles Moore Dance Theatre
Izulu Dance Theatre
Lady Helena “O’Luoju” Walquer
Sabar Ak Ru Afriq Dance Theatre

1981 The First National Festival of African American Dance Companies
Dinizulu African Dancers, Drummers & Singers
Chuck Davis Dance Company
Charles Moore Dance Theatre
International Afrikan American Ballet
Izulu Dance Theatre
Art of Black Dance and Music
Muntu Dance Theatre
Ko-Thi Dance Company

1980 A Festival of African-American Dance Companies
Dinizulu African Dancers, Drummers & Singers
Chuck Davis Dance Company
Charles Moore and Dances & Drums of Africa
International Afrikan American Ballet
Izulu Dance Theatre

1979 DanceAfrica ‘79
Dinizulu African Dancers, Drummers & Singers
Chuck Davis Dance Company
Charles Moore and Dances & Drums of Africa
International Afrikan American Ballet
Little Black Heritage Dancers

1978 A Celebration of Life
Chuck Davis Dance Company
Dinizulu African Dancers, Drummers & Singers
Arthur Hall Afro-American Dance Ensemble
Charles Moore and Dances & Drums of Africa
International Afrikan American Ballet

1977
Chuck Davis Dance Company

Lepercq Space

== DanceAfrica DC ==
Since 1987, annually in June, Chuck Davis serves as the master of ceremonies of the Festival in Washington, DC, hosted by Dance Place.

DanceAfrica, DC is an annual celebration of the cultural vitality of Africa and its diaspora within the U.S. capital. Inspired by the Brooklyn Academy of Music's festival and under the guidance of Dr. Baba Chuck Davis, Dance Place spearheaded its idiosyncratic format and traditions for the 1987 celebration. Today, Director of Dance Place's African Dance Program Sylvia Soumah serves as Artistic Director and Griot since the passing of the highly respected Dr. Baba Chuck Davis in 2017. DanceAfrica, DC is one of the longest running arms of this nationwide phenomena, celebrating over 30 years of education, artistry and advocacy for African culture in the U.S. capital.

== DanceAfrica Chicago ==
DanceAfrica Chicago began in 1990 and is presented by Columbia College Chicago. The Festival did not occur between the years of 2006-2007.
