= Spell No. 7 =

Choreopoem first performed in 1979

spell #7
- Cover of 1982 Penguin edition of Three Pieces, showing the cast in the Prologue of the New York Shakespeare Festival production of Spell #7
- Written by: Ntozake Shange
- Original language: English

Premiere
- Date premiered: 1979; 47 years ago
- Place premiered: New York Shakespeare Festival in New York, NY

spell #7, or spell #7: geechee jibara quik magic trance manual for technologically stressed third world people, is a choreopoem written for the stage by Ntozake Shange and first performed in 1979.

The story is about a group of black friends who are actors, musicians, and performers. In a series of dreamlike vignettes and poetic monologues, they commiserate about the difficulties they face as black artists. The piece is framed by the narrator, lou, a magician who wants to use his magic to help the characters come to terms with their blackness and rejoice in their identities: "i'm fixin you up good/ fixin you up good & colored / & you gonna be colored all yr life / & you gonna love it/ bein colored/ all yr life/ colored & love it / love it/ bein colored. SPELL #7." The set design calls for a "huge black-face mask" to dominate the stage, and minstrel masks are worn in the opening. These images put frustrations of the characters in conversation with the history of racism in theater, as the images of "grotesque, larger than life misrepresentation" call forth minstrel shows and Blackface. spell #7 culminates in a repetition of lou's refrain, with all the cast members singing together.

== Performance and publication history ==
spell #7 was first produced in 1979 as part of Joseph Papp's New York Shakespeare Festival. It was directed by Oz Scott and choreographed by Dianne McIntyre, with original music by David Murray and Butch Morris. The cast included Mary Alice, Avery Brooks, LaTanya Richardson, Reyno, Dyane Harvey-Salaam, Larry Marshall, Laurie Carlos and Ellis E. Williams. During the play's run, Samuel L. Jackson and Jack Landron also made appearances. It first opened as a free workshop, under the title Spell #7: A Geechee Quick Magic Trance Manual. After receiving good reviews, the production was moved up to the Anspacher Stage at The Public Theater. natalie's sharp monologue in the final act about her hypothetical life as a white woman was cut from this revised version, and Shange herself acted in a scene as sue-jean, a conflicted and violent mother. Her performance had "an unforgettable quality of coming from inside". The choreopoem was also produced at Crossroads Theatre (New Jersey) under the direction of Dean Irby, with choreography by Dyane Harvey-Salaam.

After the New York run, spell #7 went on to be performed by other companies. Among these productions were ones in 1982 at Clark College, during the Philadelphia Black Theater Festival, and at the Cauldron Experimental Theater in Boston; one in 1986 from the Avante Theater Company in Philadelphia; a 1991 performance at the Studio Theatre (Washington, D.C.); and a 1996 production at Spelman College.

The choreopoem was published in 1981 in Three Pieces, a collection of Shange's theater works. In addition to spell #7, the book contains a photograph: lovers in motion and boogie woogie landscapes, and a foreword written by Shange. spell #7 was also printed in the 1986 anthology 9 Plays by Black Women, alongside works by Beah Richards, Lorraine Hansberry, and Alice Childress, among others. Both of these versions restore the natalie monologue that was cut from the Anspacher performance.

== Style ==
Like Shange's better-known choreopoem For Colored Girls Who Have Considered Suicide When the Rainbow Is Enuf (1976), spell #7 makes use of non-standard grammar and eschews generally accepted rules of capitalization and punctuation. The most recent editions of Three Pieces do not capitalize the title of the choreopoem or any of the names of the characters. Though the piece follows the structure of a three-act play, it utilizes elements that are uncommon in most modern traditional dramas, such as extended monologues. The story takes place in a bar, and the setting does not change. Most of the action unfolds indirectly, when the characters narrate stories about themselves and their friends, and occasionally they take on multiple personas at once. In the foreword to Three Pieces, Shange explains why she avoids more traditional methods of playwriting, citing motivations related to her Black identity. "For too long now," she says, "Afro-Americans have been duped by the same artificial aesthetics that plague our white counterparts/ "the perfect play," as we know it to be/ a truly European framework for European psychology/ cannot function efficiently for those of us from this hemisphere."

== Characters ==
In order of appearance, the characters are:

- lou, a magician
- alec, an actor
- dahlia, a young singer and dancer
- eli, a bartender
- bettina, dahlia's fellow chorus dancer
- lily, an out-of-work actress working in the bar
- natalie, an unsuccessful performer
- ross, a guitar player and singer
- maxine, an actress

== Critical reception ==
Many responses to spell #7 praise its poetic language and emotional depth. One reviewer called Shange's words "lyrical, wry, painful, and comically prosaic by turn." Another reviewer wrote that Shange is "incredible in her uncanny ability to capture the precision and intensity of the moment," but then went on to criticize her style for being "distracting and predictable." In a 1980 addition to the foreword, Shange writes about one reviewer, who criticized her for writing "with intentions of outdoing the white man in the acrobatic distortions of English." In reply, Shange says that he "waz absolutely correct," she, in writing spell #7 aimed to "attack deform n maim the language that i waz taught to hate myself in...i haveta fix my tool to my needs/ i have to take it apart to the bone/ so that the malignancies/ fall away/ leaving us a space to literally create our own image."
