= Trazana Beverley =

American stage and film actress

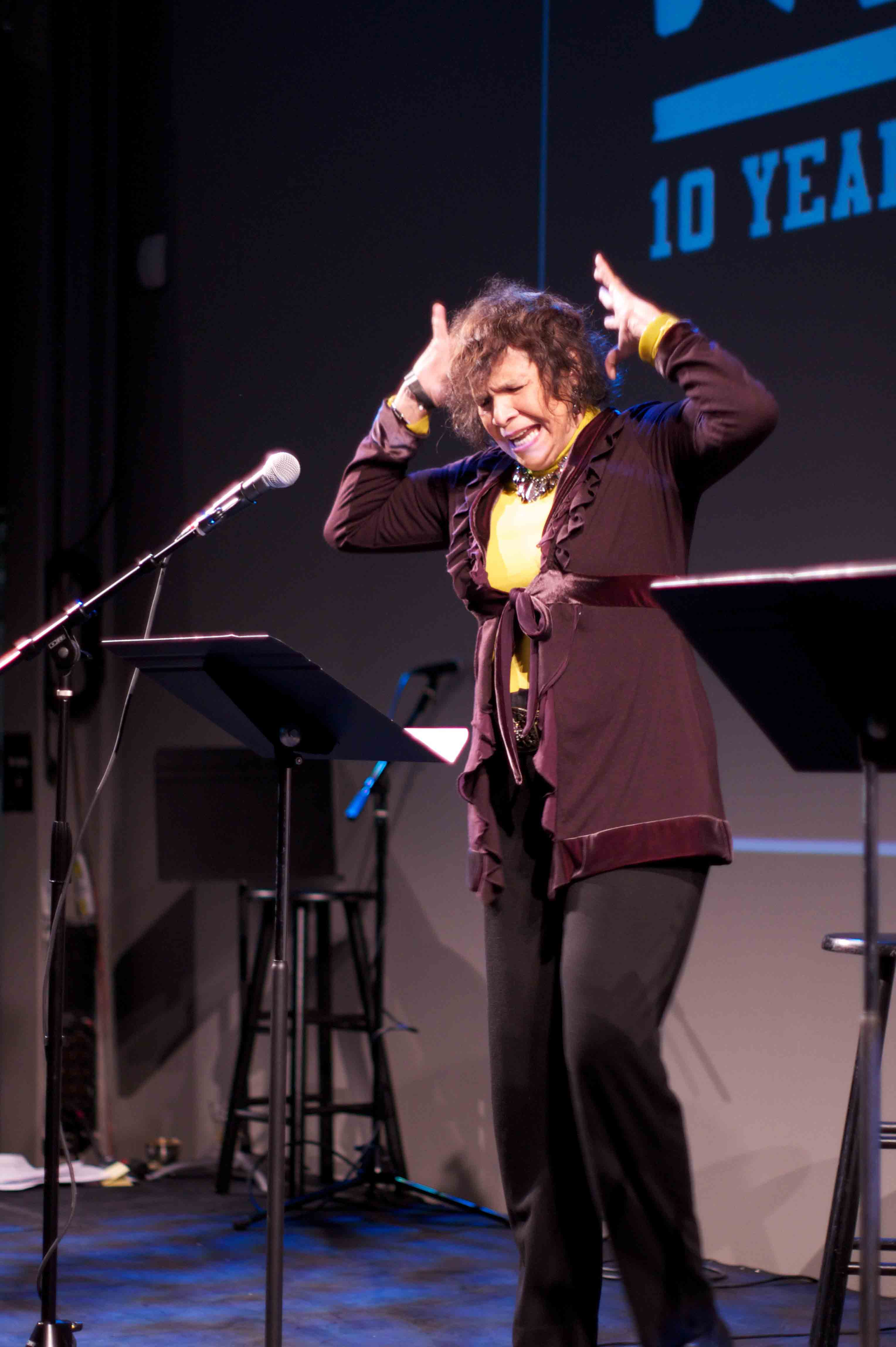
- Beverley in 2010
- Born: August 9, 1945 (age 80); Baltimore, Maryland, U.S.
- Occupation: Actress
- Years active: 1974–present

Trazana Beverley is an American stage and film actress as well as a lecturer in acting. She received a BFA in Acting from New York University's Tisch School of the Arts.

She was the first African-American actress to receive a Tony Award for "Best Featured Actress in a Play" (for the 1977 Broadway play For Colored Girls Who Have Considered Suicide / When the Rainbow Is Enuf), having previously won a Theatre World Award for the Off-Broadway production. She shared a cast Obie Award for the latter. She also won the 1977 Theatre World and Drama Desk Awards for the Broadway version. She later would star in the Arena Stage production of Before It Hits Home.

== Filmography ==
- Resurrection (1980) as Dr. Ellen Baxter
- American Playhouse (2 episodes, 1982, 1983) as Mavis Jackson / Crystal
- Sister Margaret and the Saturday Night Ladies (1987) as Johnny
- Carolina Skeletons (1991) as City Clerk
- In the Line of Duty: Street War (1992) as Goody
- Beloved (1998) as One of 'The Thirty Women'
- Never Again (2001) as Night Nurse
