= Alexandria Wailes =

American actress

- Born: Alexandria Jane Krystel Wailes; December 26, 1975 (age 50); Wilmington, Delaware, U.S.
- Occupation: Actress
- Years active: 2006–present

Alexandria Jane Krystel Wailes (born December 26, 1975) is an American deaf actress, dancer, director, and educator. She utilizes the languages of English and American Sign Language and is known for her work with Deaf West Theatre. She is both an LA Ovation nominee and a Tony honoree recipient for her work in musical theatre.

== Career ==
In 2018, Alexandria performed the National Anthem & "America the Beautiful" at Super Bowl LII in American Sign Language alongside singers Pink and Leslie Odom Jr.

== Theatre ==
=== Deaf West Theatre, L.A. ===
- Judgment Day .... God
- Quid Pro Quo .... Lindsay
- Oedipus .... Jocasta

=== Other stage works ===
- Love Person.... ???, Divadlo Mixed Blood
- Mother Courage and Her Children .... Kattrin, Public Theater
- Nobody's Perfect .... American Sign Language master and co-choreographer, Kennedy Center and Nationwide Tour
- Sleeping Beauty .... Rose, Divadlo Kirka Douglase
- Children of a Lesser God .... Sarah, Keen Company
- The Necklace .... Mother Valentine, New York City
- Aurora Leign .... Young Aurora, Ensemble Studio Theatre
- Big River .... Joanna, captain ASL, ensemble, Broadway Theatre (Nationwide Tour)
- Big River .... Joanna, Broadway Theatre, New York City (Roundabout Theatre Revival)
- This Island Alone .... Anne Tilton, Vineyard Theatre
- Pippin .... Visigoth Arm, Center Theatre Group, Los Angeles
- For Colored Girls Who Have Considered Suicide / When the Rainbow Is Enuf, Public Theater, Booth Theatre

== Filmography ==
- CODA - American Sign Language master
- Conviction - Leticia Diaz (episode 1x06 Madness)
- High Maintenance - Kate (web episode 5x03 Genghis)
- Law & Order: Criminal Intent - Malia Gallo (episode 6x18 Silencer)
- Don't Shoot the Messenger - Shawn
- Sign It! American Sign Language Made Easy - Various
- The Flash - Murmur II / Michelle Amar (3 episodes)

== Dance ==
- Neither You Nr. I (choreographer, dancer), Dancing Festival Chashama's Oasis
