= Taylor-Stevenson Ranch =

- Established: 1875
- Coordinates: 29.6518°N 95.4051°W
- Type: Historical

Taylor-Stevenson Ranch is an historic 640-acre working ranch located near Reliant Stadium on Almeda Rd. in Houston, TX. The ranch was officially designated in the Congressional Record as a "Texas Century Ranch" which recognizes ownership by the same family for over a century. It was also recognized as the only African-American owned ranch in Texas with the century ranch designation.

The ranch was originally purchased in 1875 by Edward Ruthven Taylor at the persuasion of Ann George, who was one of the family's former slaves charged with overseeing Edward during his illness. The two fell in love and lived openly together as husband and wife, although they never officially married because at that time interracial marriage was a violation of Texas law. They raised six children, all of whom received a college education. Their granddaughter, Mollie Taylor Stevenson Sr. (1911-2003), a graduate of Fisk University, and her daughter, Mollie Taylor Stevenson Jr., (1946), who attended Texas Southern University, were both inducted into the National Cowgirl Museum and Hall of Fame in 2001, the first living African-American women to receive the honor.

Taylor-Stevenson Ranch now houses the Taylor Stevenson Ranch Meat Co, founded by Major W. Stevenson Jr. and his wife, Anitria Stevenson. Together the Stevensons are committed to continuing the legacy of excellence through ranching.

== History ==
In 1862, 16-year-old Edward Taylor (1845-1924) joined Waul's Texas Legion, a unit in the Confederate Army that originated in Brenham, TX. Edward was captured during the Battle of Vicksburg, and while being held prisoner, he contracted tuberculosis, or consumption as it was called in the 1800s. After his release from prison and discharge from further service in the army, he returned home to his parents, Aaroline and Edward Wyllys Taylor. Edward's parents had moved from Massachusetts to Texas sometime during the 1840s, and settled in Houston on land that became the site of the Wortham Center. E.W. Taylor was a prominent 19th-century merchant who had served many years as president of the Houston Cotton Exchange Board, and also brokered in slave trade.

Ann George, a 21-year-old black slave who was purchased by Edward Wyllys in 1856, was charged with overseeing young Edward's care. She nurtured him back to good health and over time, the two fell in love. During the Civil War era, interracial marriage in Texas was not only illegal, it was dangerous for interracial couples to live under the same roof. Despite the risks, Edward and Ann were unofficially married, and chose to live openly as husband and wife.

In 1875, Ann persuaded Edward to purchase land south of town in Pierce Junction, now known as the Taylor-Stevenson Ranch, where they could raise hay, livestock, and farm the land. They raised six children, all of whom were among the first African-Americans in Texas to receive a college education. It was three decades after their initial purchase that Edward first discovered oil under his land. By 1921, a producing oil well had been drilled by Hugh Roy Cullen on what became known as the Pierce Junction field. Of further historic significance, drilling the Pierce Junction field led to an innovative new drill bit designed by Hughes Tool Company that could drill through rock.

In 1946, aviators Azellia White, Hulon "Pappy" White, Ben Stevenson, and Elton "Ray" Thomas opened the Sky Ranch Flying Service on the property. Stevenson, Thomas, and Hulon White were Tuskegee Airmen, while Azellia White was the first African-American woman to get her private pilot's license in Texas. The Sky Ranch Flying Service provided flying lessons and charter flights. It included a commercial airport used by African-American aviators, which had three runways up to 2,200 feet in length. The service closed when new restrictions on the use of the G.I. Bill caused a decline in customers.

== American Cowboy Museum ==
The American Cowboy Museum is located on the Taylor-Stevenson Ranch. Established in 1988 by Mollie Taylor Stevenson Jr., the museum is focused on the art, history, and culture of the contributions of African Americans, Hispanic, Native Americans, and women to the development of the American West. Displays include fine art and posters, and historic papers and photographs related to the ranch. Other exhibits include cowboy gear and memorabilia, including saddles, spurs, hats, chaps, boots and other cowboy items. Outdoor displays of ranch equipment include tractors, plows, cultivators and planters.
