= Dorothy Layne McIntyre =

African-American aviator

- Born: Dorothy Arlene Layne; January 27, 1917; Le Roy, New York
- Died: August 30, 2015 (aged 98); Mount Pleasant, Cleveland, Ohio
- Education: West Virginia State College
- Known for: One of the first licensed Black female pilots
- Spouse: F. Benjamin McIntyre
- Children: 2, including Dianne McIntyre
- Parent(s): Clyde and Lena Hart Layne
- Awards: Bessie Coleman Award, 1994

Dorothy Arlene Layne McIntyre (27 January 1917 – 30 August 2015) was an African-American aviator and educator. In 1940, she became the first African-American woman to receive a pilot's license from the Civil Aeronautics Authority.

== Biography ==
Dorothy Arlene Layne was born in Le Roy, New York in 1917. Dorothy's mother died when she was five years old. She was raised by her widowed father who managed a farm and her grandparents, who urged her and her sister Ruth to get an education. As a child, her father would take her to airshows at the local Le Roy Airport, where she would take her first flight in an airplane aged 11 or 12.

Layne was reportedly an excellent student, graduating from Le Roy High School in 1936. After completing her secondary school education, Layne attended West Virginia State College on a scholarship.

=== Flight cadet ===
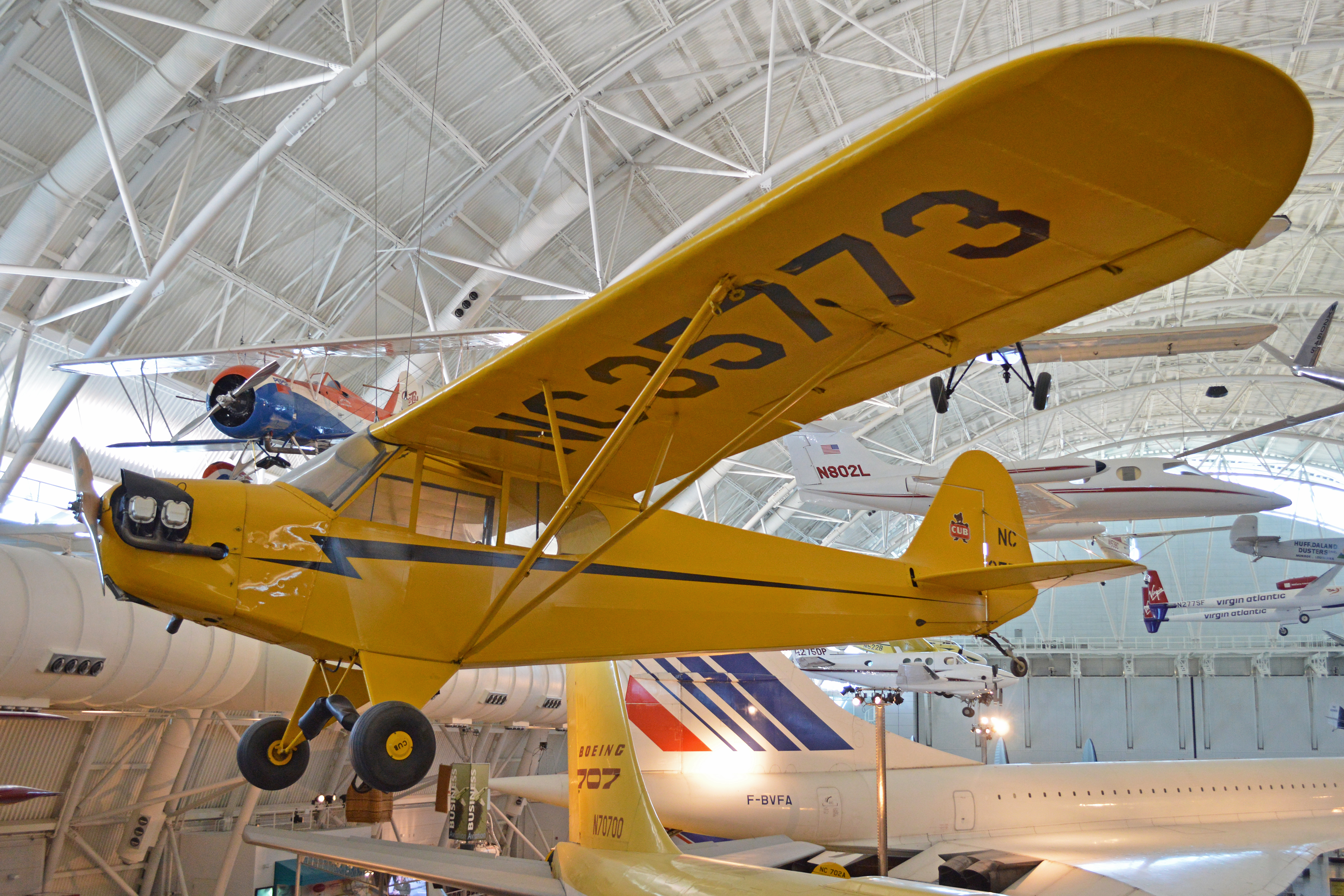
A 1941 Piper J-3 Cub, a similar model to the plane that Layne would learn to fly on.

In 1939, she enrolled in Virginia State College's cadet flying program, the only woman to be accepted to the program. There, she completed her pilot's training on a Piper J-3 Cub. On February 23, 1940, she received her pilot's license from the Civil Aeronautics Authority, becoming the first Black woman to receive a license. During World War II, she applied to join the Women Airforce Service Pilots (WASP) program, but was denied because of her race. She next applied to the Civil Aviation Authority to be a lookout for enemy aircraft, but was denied when she appeared at the interview. Layne would go on to teach aircraft mechanics in Baltimore, Maryland and work as a secretary for the Baltimore Urban League.

=== Move to Cleveland ===
In 1942, Layne married Francis Benjamin McIntyre and the pair moved to Cleveland, Ohio. The couple would have two daughters. When her children were born, McIntyre gave up flying. McIntyre would become an accountant and teacher at Cleveland's Paul Revere School.

In 2002 she was inducted into the Cleveland Educators and Alumni Hall of Fame.

McIntyre died on August 30, 2015.

In 2020, she was featured in "The Changemakers: Rochester Women Who Changed the World," an exhibition at the Rochester Museum and Science Center.

== See also ==
- Bessie Coleman, first African-American woman and first Native American to hold a pilot license
- Azellia White, the first African-American woman to earn a pilot's license in Texas (1946)
