= Azellia White =

American aviator (1913–2019)

- Born: June 3, 1913; Gonzales, Texas, U.S.
- Died: September 15, 2019 (aged 106); Houston, Texas
- Occupation: Aviator
- Spouse: Hulon White

Azellia White (June 3, 1913 – September 15, 2019) was an American aviator who was one of the first African-American women to earn a pilot's license in Texas. She is recognized as a trailblazer, overcoming widespread perceptions at the time, "that neither women nor African Americans were qualified to fly airplanes." She and her husband ran the Sky Ranch Flying Service, an airport and flight school for African-American aviators.

== Life ==
In 1936, Azellia married Hulon "Pappy" White. Five years later, they relocated to Tuskegee, Alabama, where Hulon White worked as an airplane mechanic with the Tuskegee Airmen. Azellia White was inspired by a visit from Eleanor Roosevelt in 1941, after which Roosevelt encouraged her husband to let the Tuskegee Airmen fly in World War II. White began training there, flying a Taylorcraft airplane under the instruction of several Tuskegee Airmen. She earned her private pilot's license on March 26, 1946.

After World War II ended, the Whites moved to South Houston. Together with Tuskegee Airmen Ben Stevenson and Elton "Ray" Thomas, they founded the Sky Ranch Flying Service in 1946. Located on the Taylor-Stevenson Ranch, the Sky Ranch Flying Service was an airport for Houston's black community and provided charter flights as well as flying lessons. Azellia White was not an official owner, but was popular around the airport. Flying students often asked her to take them for rides, and she would sometimes play pranks on them in midair, taking them by surprise with stunts. Because travel by land exposed African-Americans to potential harassment or assault, she would sometimes fly from town to town with her niece to go shopping. Sky Ranch Flying Service closed when new laws restricted the use of the G.I. Bill and caused business to slow.

== Legacy ==
In April 2018 White was inducted into the Texas Aviation Hall of Fame (housed in Lone Star Flight Museum). In Houston, the Aviation Science Lab at Sterling High School was named in her honor. Principal Justin Fuentes called her "a powerful reminder to our students that they can be anything they want to be and achieve anything they want to achieve. No one can stop them." White received the Trailblazer Award from the Black Pilots of America for her “pioneering spirit in forging a path to the field of aviation.”

White died on September 15, 2019, aged 106.

== See also ==
- Dorothy Layne McIntyre, first African-American woman to receive a pilot's license from the Civil Aeronautics Authority (1940)
