= Love's Fire =

- Written by: John Guare; Wendy Wasserstein; Eric Bogosian; Ntozake Shange; Tony Kushner; William Finn; Marsha Norman
- Original language: English

Premiere
- Date premiered: 1998
- Directed by: Mark Lamos

Love's Fire is a collection of seven short plays by American writers based on Shakespeare's Sonnets. It was commissioned and premiered by The Acting Company in its 1997-98 season, and directed by Mark Lamos. It was presented by the Barbican Centre in London, before transferring to the Joseph Papp Public Theatre Off Broadway.

== Plays ==
The plays comprised:

- "Bitter Sauce" by Eric Bogosian, inspired by Sonnet 118
- "Hydraulics Phat Like Mean" by Ntozake Shange, inspired by Sonnet 128; a dance piece, with original music by Chico Freeman and choreography by Dyane Harvey
- "140" by Marsha Norman, inspired by Sonnet 140
- "Terminating" by Tony Kushner, inspired by Sonnet 75
- "Painting You" by William Finn, inspired by Sonnet 102
- "Waiting for Philip Glass" by Wendy Wasserstein, inspired by Sonnet 94
- "The General of Hot Desire" by John Guare, inspired by Sonnets 153 and 154; original music by Adam Guettel
