= Abdel R. Salaam =

American choreographer, director, producer, mentor, and educator

- Born: New York, NY
- Occupations: Artistic director, producer, choreographer, educator
- Relatives: Spouse (Dyane Harvey-Salaam)
- Website: http://forcesofnature.org/

Abdel R. Salaam was born in Harlem, New York City. He is a choreographer, director, producer, mentor, and educator. He has been active in the arts since 1955. He is the co-founder and director of Forces of Nature Dance Theatre located in New York City. He is also the artistic director of DanceAfrica. DanceAfrica was founded by Chuck Davis (dancer). DanceAfrica festival has become one of the largest African American dance, music, and art festival in the United States of America. Thousands of people attend the yearly festival which takes place at the Brooklyn Academy of Music during the Memorial Day holiday. The festival includes an outdoor bazaar, films, music, and workshops. It is one of Brooklyn Academy of Music's longest running festival.

In 1981 Abdel Salaam, Olabamidele Husbands, and principal dancer, Dyane Harvey founded Forces of Nature Dance Theatre company. A New York City based dance company. It is a fusion of traditional African dance, ritual dance using ballet, modern dance and hip-hop

== Early life ==
Abdel studied piano, xylophone, and glockenspiel at the age of five. At the age of nine he studied classical viola, and at the age of eleven he was playing alto saxophone. He attended High School of Music and Art in New York City. He graduated in 1968. After high school he attended Lehman College in the Bronx, New York City. While attending Lehman College he met Professor Joan Miller (choreographer) a dancer and choreographer. She recruited Abdel into the college's first dance major program, and was his mentor. Such dance teachers as Louis Falco, John Parks, Nadine Revine, Miguel Godreau, Chuck Davis and along with Joan Miller were faculty in the newly formed dance department degree program. He credits Joan Miller as being an influence that helped to shape his mission and beliefs towards art and dance. His mission and belief to use art to make social, political, and environmental statements that promote harmony with the planet and ecosystem, and with our issues and problems as people.

== Career ==
While Abdel Salaam was studying at Lehman College Abdel became a principal dancer with the Joan Miller Chamber Arts Dance players. Early in his career he performed as principle with the Fred Benjamin Dance Company, Ron Pratt's Alpha Omega 1-7 Theatrical Dance Company, and Otis Sallid's New Art Ensemble. Later he became Associate Artistic Director for Chuck Davis Dance Company. Which performs internally. He has also been guest artist with the American Contemporary Ballet Company and with the Contemporary Chamber Dance Theater.

In 1981, Abdel co-founded Forces of Nature Dance Theatre with his partner Olabamidele Husbands and his wife, former principal dancer Dyane Harvey.

In the 80's Abdel was a delegate for the Artists for Ecology's International Summit that was held at the Sundance Institute in Utah. He was a participant for the Conference on Third World Arts held at the European Theater in Oxford, England. Also in the 80s he participated in the 12th Annual Festival for Peace in Moscow, Russia.

In 1988 Abdel was commissioned by Reverend James Parks Morton a dean with the Cathedral of St. John the Divine to create an African Episcopal Mass for the church using dance, music, and voice.

He was a Brooklyn Academy of Music cultural delegate to the Dance Umbrella/Dance Alive Festival. The festival was held in Johannesburg, South Africa.

Abdel is trained in modern dance, Afro-Caribbean and American modern-dance forms, ballet, jazz, traditional African dance, and martial arts. Forces of Nature Dance Theatre gives a yearly Kwanzaa at the Apollo theater in Harlem. Before moving the Kwanzaa to the Apollo it was at Aaron Davis Hall in New York City. Forces of Nature Dance Theatre company was founded in 1981. In 1990 Forces of Nature Dance Theatre company along with the Alvin Ailey Dance company lead the procession during Nelson and Winnie Mandela's historic visit to New York City.

In 2015 Abdel became the artistic director for DanceAfrica by Chuck Davis who had started DanceAfrica in 1977. The festival brings artists from Africa, the African Diaspora and artists and local dance companies and artists and dance companies from the United States of America.

In 2016, his theatre dance company Forces of Nature did a three-part PBS "Great Performances". A television special on the history of Black dance in the 20th Century. The television special was entitled 'Free to Dance'. His dance company was part of a film project what the National Association of Black Museums on the influence of African American dance in Western culture. This project was titled 'When the Spirit Moves'. The dance company also a part of an exhibit at the Smithsonian Institution in Washington, DC.

Abdel Salaam is also artistic director of Brooklyn's DanceAfrica festival, director of the Harlem Children's Zone/Forces of Nature Youth Academy of Dance, and the artistic director of an annual Kwanzaa celebration at the Apollo Theater in Harlem.

He has been on the faculties of Alvin Ailey American Dance Center, Chuck Davis Dance Academy, and Lehman College. He is currently a director for the Harlem Children's Zone and Forces of Nature Youth Academy of Dance, and Wellness at St. Martin's Episcopal Church in Harlem.

== Theatre credits ==
Theaterworks USA as a choreographer for: "Sundiata, the Lion King of Mali" directed by David Schecter.

Choreography for "Measure for Measure" directed by Michael Rudman at the New York Shakespeare Festival's held at the Delacorte Theater at Lincoln Center, New York City.

Choreography for "Pecong" directed Dennis Zacek held at the Newark Symphony Hall.

His theater credits as director and choreographer include:

- "Ju-Ju Man" at the Billie Holiday Theater in Brooklyn.
- "Ancestral Earths" at the Apollo Theater in New York.
- "Ebony Magic" at the Aaronow Theater in New York City.
- "Sweet Saturday Night", which was a 20-city tour produced by Gordon Crowe Productions.
- "American Griot" at the Triplex Theater in New York, New York.

== Television credits ==
Choreographer for:

- "The Creative Spirit", WNET Channel Thirteen
- "Expressions in Black: Story of a People", for WABC
- "The Caribbean Music Awards", for BET Global Syndication
- "St. Francis Celebration" at the Cathedral of St. John the Divine
- WNET Channel Thirteen, "Mufaro's Beautiful Daughters."
- WNET Channel Thirteen; "Great Performances: Forces of Nature."
- Telemundo television, Mexico City
- "Critics Choice: Abdel Salaam", Gala TV (Mexico)
- Abdel appeared on the Richard Pryor Show as a performer.
- Great Performances "The American Dance Festival."
- WPIX Talk of the Town.

== Noted works ==
- "Eclipse: Visions of the Crescent and the Cross." Abdel describes the 'Eclipse as a "choreo-journey that explores conflicts and similarities between Islam and Christianity, from the Crusades on."
- "The Life and Legend of Marie Laveau". A dance theater work about a New Orleans voodoo priestess from the 18th century.
- "Coming Forth by Day"
- "Step One: Dance at the New Victory"
- "Ode to Brahma"
- "Terrestrial Wombs"
- "Rhythm Legacy: The Living Books; Book IV: Club Legacy and Beyond"
- "Ancestral Earths"
- "Healing Seven"
- "Rhythm Tree"
- "Forest Guardians"

== Awards and honors ==
- 1987 - DanceAfrica Award in Choreography
- 1989 - American Choreographer of the Year nomination
- 1991 to 1993 - Choreography - Fellowship from the National Endowment for the Arts
- 1994 to 1996 - Choreography - Fellowship from the National Endowment for the Arts
- 1992 - Monarch Merit Award for Outstanding Achievement in Dance from the National Council for Arts & Culture
- 1994 - Lehman College - Silver Anniversary Award for Outstanding Achievement in Choreography, Teaching and Performance
- 2000 - Better Family Life Lifetime Achievement Award in Arts
- 2003 to 2007 - Artist in Residence, Tennessee Performing Art Center
- 2004 - New York Foundation for the Arts fellow
- 2007 - DanceAfrica Award in Choreography
- 2013 - 41st annual Audelco Award for Excellence in Black Theater as Dance Company of the year
- 2017 - The Bessie Awards in dance for 'Healing Seven'

== Quotes ==
"My spirit is exalted through Art and the world of Dance! Dance and the Divine are One!" "A lot of people don't know that there is a huge contemporary dance movement on the African continent and a lot of it is postmodern."

"A lot of that movement comes from the essence of taking traditional culture and rather than trying to imitate what you were raised in, it's about making a contemporary statement about the dynamism of African culture as we take our traditional language and turn it into something more modern. I feel DanceAfrica should reflect the many streams of consciousness in African dance." Abdel R. Salaam
