= National Cowboy & Western Heritage Museum =

Museum in Oklahoma City, Oklahoma, US

Coordinates: 35°32′08″N 97°28′59″W

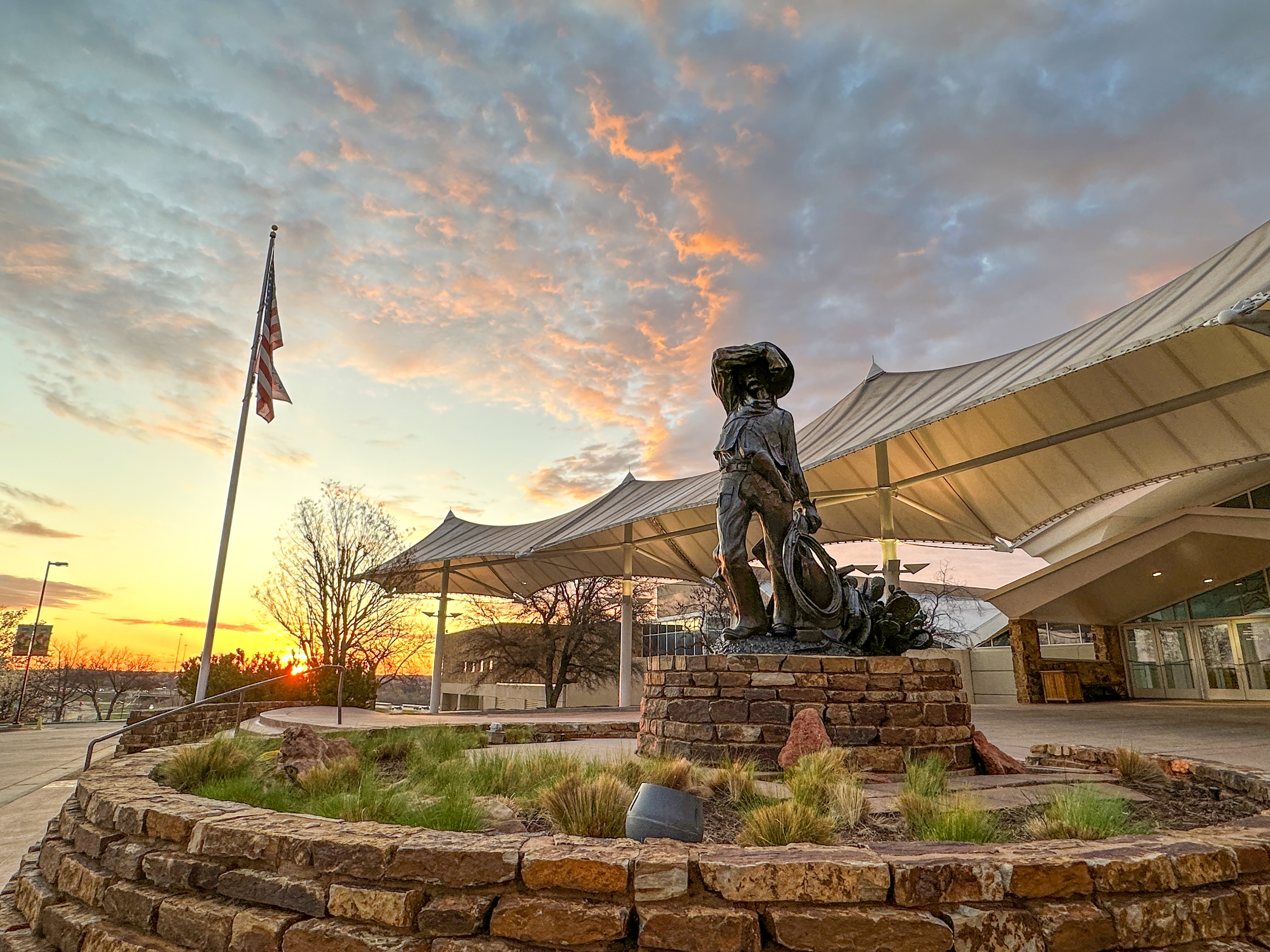
- The National Cowboy & Western Heritage Museum was founded in 1955 and opened the doors to its facility in Oklahoma City in 1965.
- Established: 1955
- Location: Oklahoma City, Oklahoma, U.S.
- Type: Hall of fame
- Website: Official website

The National Cowboy & Western Heritage Museum is a museum in Oklahoma City, Oklahoma, United States, with more than 28,000 Western and American Indian art works and artifacts. The facility also has the world's most extensive collection of American rodeo photographs, barbed wire, saddlery, and early rodeo trophies. Museum collections focus on preserving and interpreting the heritage of the American West. The museum has an extensive collection of paintings by Charles Marion Russell and Frederic Remington. It also hosts the annual Prix de West Invitational Art Exhibition and Sale each June, one of the leading events in the world of Western American Art. The Prix de West Artists sell original works of art as a fundraiser for the museum.

== History ==
The museum was established in 1955 as the Cowboy Hall of Fame and Museum, from an idea proposed by Chester A. Reynolds, to honor the cowboy and his era. Later that same year, the name was changed to the National Cowboy Hall of Fame and Museum. In 1960, the name was changed again to the National Cowboy Hall of Fame and Western Heritage Center. The American Alliance of Museums gave the museum full accreditation in 2000, when it took on its present name.

To maintain the memory of the founder, the museum grants the Chester A. Reynolds Memorial Award. This prize is granted to a person or institution contributing to the preservation of American West history and heritage.

== Exhibits ==
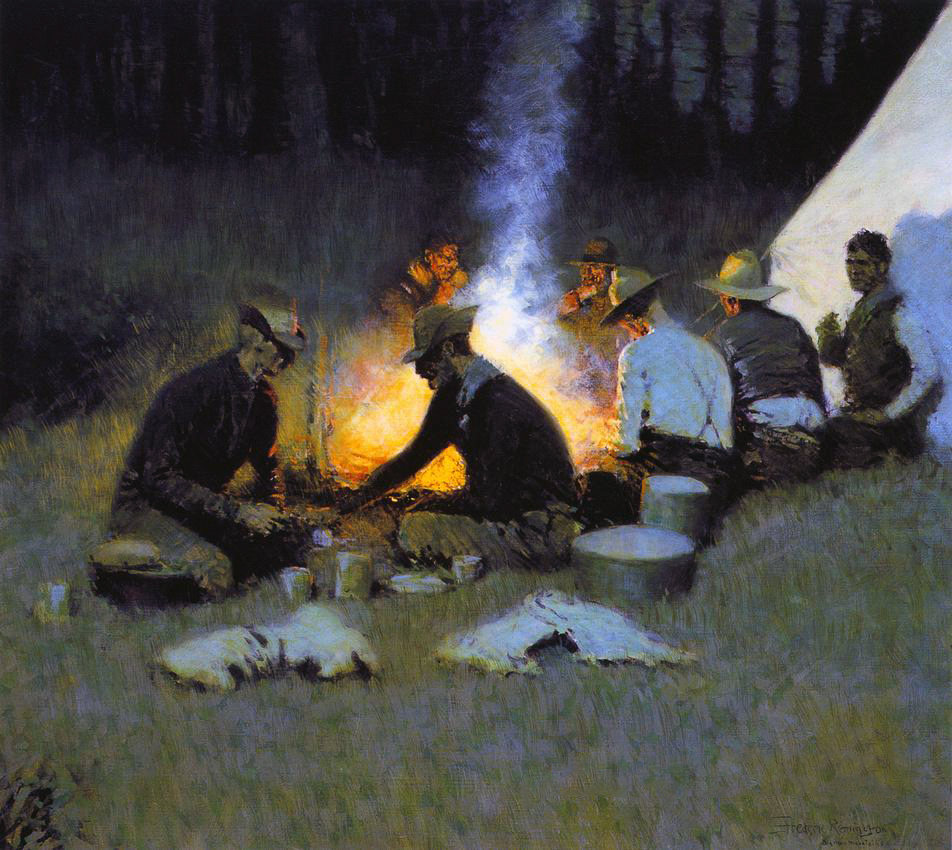
The Hunters' Supper (detail) by Frederic Remington, circa 1909

The museum encompasses more than 200,000 sq ft (19,000 m^{2}) of display space. The museum's collection includes over 2,000 works of western art, the "William S. and Ann Atherton Art of the American West Gallery". The 15,000 sq ft (1,400 m^{2}) exhibit space contains landscapes, portraits, colorful still lifes, and sculptures by 19th- and 20th-century artists, including over 200 works by Russell, Remington, Albert Bierstadt, Solon Borglum, Thurmond Restuettenhall, Robert Lougheed, Charles Schreyvogel, and other early artists. The collection also includes over 700 pieces by Edward S. Curtis, and over 350 by Joe De Yong, along with the large plaster sculpture of James Earle Fraser's End of the Trail. The museum also houses contemporary Western art created over the last 30 years by award-winning Prix de West artists. The first winner was a large oil by Clark Hulings, "Grand Canyon - Kaibob Trail", about a mule team barely crossing a Grand Canyon trail in deep winter snow.

The historical galleries include the American Cowboy Gallery, a look at the life and traditions of a working cowboy and ranching history; the American Rodeo Gallery, fashioned after a 1950s rodeo arena, provides a look at America's native sport; the Joe Grandee Museum of the Frontier West Gallery exhibits some of the more than 4,500 artifacts that once belonged to Western artist Joe Grandee; the Native American Gallery focuses on the embellishments that Western tribes made to their everyday objects to reflect their beliefs and histories; the Weitzenhoffer Gallery of Fine American Firearms houses over 100 examples of firearms by Colt, Remington, Smith & Wesson, Sharps, Winchester, Marlin, and Parker Brothers.

The museum also houses Prosperity Junction, a 14,000-square-foot (1,300 m^{2}) authentic turn-of-the-century Western prairie town. Visitors can stroll the streets, peek in some of the store windows, listen to antique player pianos, and actually walk into some of the fully furnished buildings.

The museum also is home to an interactive children's museum titled Liichokoshkomo’. Making its debut in 2020, this outdoor space, meaning "let’s play", encompasses more than 100,000 square feet and offers hands-on learning through purposeful play and engaging activities, such as dodging a geyser, grinding corn, and loading a pioneer wagon.

In September 2022, it was announced that the museum's American Rodeo Gallery would house the Professional Bull Riders Heroes & Legends Hall of Fame. It opened to the public the following year.

The Museum is already home to the National Rodeo Hall of Fame, which was established in 1955, the year of the museum's founding.

== Western Heritage Awards ==
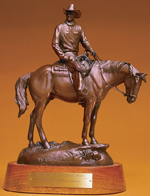
"The Wrangler" in bronze

Every year, during the Western Heritage Awards, the museum awards the Bronze Wrangler, an original bronze sculpture by artist John Free, to principal creators of the winning entries in specified categories of Western literature, music, film, and television.

== Hall of Great Western Performers and Hall of Great Westerners ==
Bulldogging photo of "Cowboy Morgan Evans", 1927 World Champion

During the Western Heritage Awards ceremony, the museum also inducts members into its Hall of Great Western Performers, honoring those who have brought the story of the American West to life in movies and television.

Past inductees have included John Wayne, Roy Rogers, Gene Autry, William S. Hart, Tom Mix, Hoot Gibson, Ken Maynard, Harry Carey, John Kent Harrison, Tex Ritter, Rex Allen, Randolph Scott, Joel McCrea, Richard Widmark, James Stewart, Buck Taylor, Howard R. Lamar, Ben Johnson, and Tom Selleck. In 2025, actors Graham Greene, and Anthony Quinn were inducted.

The Museum is also home its Hall of Great Westerners, honoring people who exemplify the spirit and the story of the American West. The first class of Great Westerners in 1955 includes Will Rogers, Theodore Roosevelt, Charles Goodnight, and Russell. Other inductees include Levi Strauss, Sandra Day O'Connor, Willa Cather, and Sequoyah.

== National Rodeo Hall of Fame ==
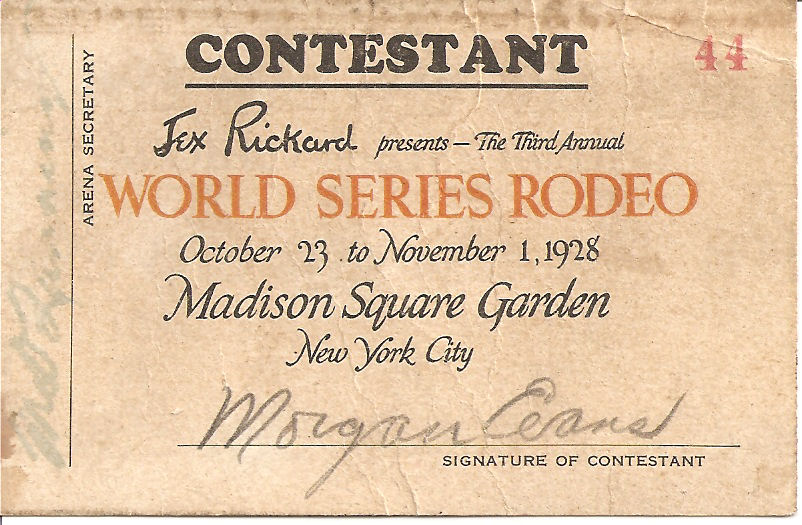
"Cowboy Morgan Evans" 1928 World Series Rodeo Contest entry chit

Each year, members of the Rodeo Historical Society (RHS) vote to induct members into the National Rodeo Hall of Fame, housed at the museum. The museum hosts a champions dinner and induction ceremony in November.

These are a few of the members of the Rodeo Hall of Fame, followed by the year they were inducted:

| Award year | Name | Notes |
|---|---|---|
| 1982 | Chris Lybbert | Also inducted in 2006 in the ProRodeo Hall of Fame. |
| 1988 | J.C. "Doc" Sorensen | |
| 1995 | Dale D. Smith | |
| 2002 | Bonnie McCarroll | Awarded posthumously |
| 2006 | Dan Collins Taylor | |
| 2009 | Cotton Rosser | |
| 2009 | Reg Kesler | Awarded posthumously |
| 2013 | Earl W. Bascom | Awarded posthumously. |

== Donald C. and Elizabeth M. Dickinson Research Center ==
The Donald C. and Elizabeth M. Dickinson Research Center (originally known as the Research Library of Western Americana) opened on June 26, 1965. Today, the center serves as the library and archives of the museum. The center is a closed-stacks library, containing books, photographs, oral histories, and manuscripts focusing on western popular culture, western art, ranching, Native Americans, and rodeo.
