= Sylvia Soumah =

West African dance expert

- Born: July 31, 1963 (age 63); Cincinnati, Ohio, US
- Education: University of Cincinnati, School for Creative and Performing Arts
- Known for: Coyaba Dance Theater

External videos
- "Washington Performing Arts presents: 2024 Pola Nirenska Award to Sylvia Soumah", Feb 5, 2025

Sylvia Soumah (born July 31, 1963) is an American dancer, choreographer, and educator, renowned for her contributions to African dance in the United States. She founded and is the artistic director of the Coyaba Dance Theater, based in Washington, D.C. As a teaching artist, Soumah emphasizes the community and spirituality of African dance in both its traditional and contemporary styles, and uses performance and community engagement to foster a broader appreciation for West African cultures. She has performed extensively throughout the United States and internationally, including in Korea, Senegal, Guinea, and Guinea Bissau.

Sylvia Soumah was recognized by the Council of the District of Columbia with the Sylvia Soumah Recognition Resolution of 2013, for her contributions in founding and directing Coyaba Dance Theater. She has received multiple awards including the 2024 Pola Nirenska Lifetime Achievement Award for her contributions to dance and education.

== Early life ==
Born in Cincinnati and raised in a single-parent household, Soumah and her five siblings grew up in a housing project in the city's predominantly Black West End neighborhood. Her mother, Shirley Merritt, had her first child at 15 and left school in the 8th grade, but she worked hard to ensure all of her children graduated from high school. An avid social dancer, Merritt filled her family's home with music. Soumah credits her mother for imparting an inherited passion for the arts.

Soumah was introduced to formal dance instruction in the 7th grade by dancer and teaching artist Carla Perlo, then a student at the University of Cincinnati, who led a community program at a local recreation center. When she spotted Soumah and her friends hanging out nearby, Perlo invited the young teens to learn how to dance. The instruction also helped Soumah discover her talent for singing, which she enjoyed as much as dancing. Later, Perlo encouraged Soumah to audition for the School for Creative and Performing Arts in Cincinnati, where Soumah studied dance and vocal music.

"I could have ended up like a couple of my friends—their fate didn't turn out too well. But afterschool, we just danced and played together. We didn't do the typical stuff that other kids in our neighborhood was getting in trouble and doing. We somehow just instinctively knew: just focus on the dance and focus on the art," Soumah has said of her early dance instruction. "Dance is my life right now and probably will be 'til the end. [Carla] was the one who inspired us all and taught us how to dance."

As a teen, Soumah performed in productions of the Cincinnati Opera including Amahl and the Night Visitors, Carmen and Show Boat, and in musical theater shows such as Guys and Dolls, The Music Man, and The Wiz at the National Theatre in Washington, D.C. She later majored in early childhood education at the University of Cincinnati.

== Career ==
=== From modern dance to West African training ===
In 1986, Soumah moved to Washington, D.C., to study modern dance with Perlo, who had relocated to the nation's capital to found Carla and Company, a modern dance troupe. There Soumah was introduced to a range of choreographers, including Nancy Havlik, Alvin Mayes, Lesa McLaughlin, and Debra Riley. During this time, she also performed with Improvisations Unlimited at the University of Maryland. directed by Mim Rosen.

Practical necessity led to her conversion to African dance in 1990. After the birth of her son, Soumah resumed participation in modern dance classes and often had to bring her child along with her. By the time he was two years old, the toddler's crying and restlessness disrupted the quiet and intensity necessary for modern dance training. After one class, a drummer suggested Soumah switch to African dance where her son could be better accommodated because, he told her, even a noisy toddler can't compete with the sound of drumming. Her son's acceptance into the class embodied what Soumah came to love about the style.

"African [dance is] about community," she said in an interview with Smithsonian magazine. "It's spiritual, it's about family and it's about culture. Modern ballet is a dance form. But African dance is a dance form and a culture. It's a way of life."

Soumah began to study West African dance in 1992 with Aidoo Holmes, founding artistic director of Wose Dance Theater in Washington, D.C. There she developed her skills in African dance technique, solo performance, drumming and singing. This experience led her to study West African dance intensively in Guinea and Senegal, training with Les Ballets Africains and Bouly Sonko of the National Ballet of Senegal.

=== Coyaba Dance Theater ===
In 1997, Soumah founded Coyaba Dance Theater, which has since become a cornerstone of the African dance community in Washington, D.C. The company performs traditional and contemporary African dance and regularly collaborates with renowned musicians and dancers from West Africa. Coyaba has performed at major venues, including the Kennedy Center and Dance Place, and has toured internationally. In 2001 and again in 2004, Coyaba received the D.C. Dance Award for outstanding group performance.

Soumah has also collaborated with organizations and artists such as Step Afrika and Kingsman Island Festival in Washington, D.C., Usuthu Arts Productions in South Africa, Salamata in Ghana, and Jessica Phillips Silver (Finding Rhythm! The Journey Through The Musical Brain, 2020). She co-choreographed and performed with the touring company What's Going On, directed by Vincent Thomas.

== Educational work ==
Soumah has been a dedicated dance educator, teaching at Dance Place and serving as a teaching artist with Inspired Child. She has led workshops at institutions such as the National Museum of African Art and Washington Performing Arts. She also trains young dancers in traditional African dance forms at the Coyaba Academy, where she emphasizes cultural heritage and artistic expression. She was also featured in an educational music video with Inspired Child, A to Z This is MY DC.

== Awards and recognition ==
In 2013, the Council of the District of Columbia passed the Sylvia Soumah Recognition Resolution of 2013, honoring her for her "extraordinary leadership, dedicated service, and positive contributions to the Washington, D.C. metropolitan area as the Founder and Artistic Director of Coyaba Dance Theater." She has received acclaim for her choreography, particularly her work Year of the Griot, which was praised by The Washington Post.

Soumah received the 2014-2015 Pola Nirenska Award from Washington Performing Arts for her contributions to dance and education and in 2020, she was the recipient of the Marcus Mosiah Garvey Outstanding Community Service Award. Soumah was also honored with the 2024 Pola Nirenska Lifetime Achievement Award for her contributions to dance and education.

== Personal life ==
Soumah has two children: a son born in 1988 and a daughter born in 1996.
