= Dianne McIntyre =

American dancer, choreographer and teacher

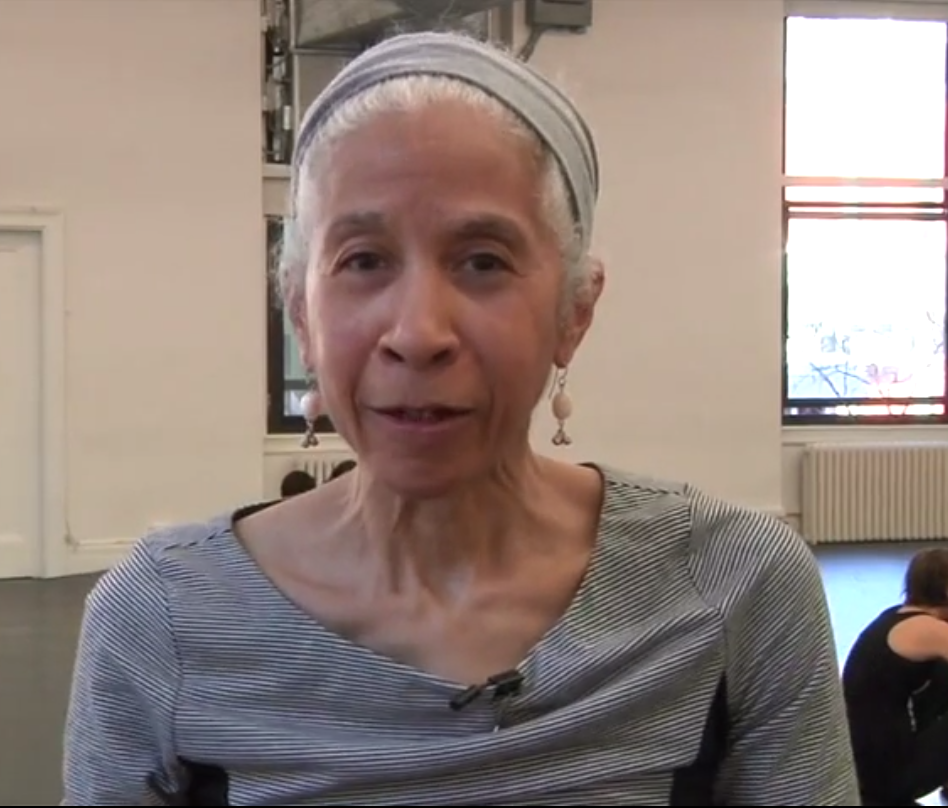
- Born: July 1946 (age 80); Cleveland, Ohio
- Education: Ohio State University
- Occupations: dancer, teacher, choreographer
- Years active: 1970–present
- Parent(s): Dorothy Layne McIntyre and Francis Benjamin McIntyre
- Website: diannemcintyre.com

Dianne McIntyre (born July 1946) is an American dancer, choreographer, and teacher. Her notable works include Their Eyes Were Watching God: A Dance Adventure in Southern Blues (A Choreodrama), an adaptation of Zora Neal Hurston's novel Their Eyes Were Watching God, as well as productions of why i had to dance, spell #7, and for colored girls who have considered suicide when the rainbow is enuf, with text by Ntozake Shange. She has won numerous honors for her work including an Emmy nomination, three Bessie Awards, and a Helen Hayes Award. She is a member of the Stage Directors and Choreographers Society, the American Society of Composers, Authors and Publishers, and the Dramatists Guild of America.

== Early life and education ==
Dianne McIntyre was born in July 1946 in Cleveland, Ohio to Dorothy Layne McIntyre, the first African-American woman to be licensed by the Civil Aeronautics Authority, and Francis Benjamin McIntyre. At the age of four, McIntyre began studying ballet under the tutelage of Elaine Gibbs after seeing Janet Collins in the Metropolitan Opera Company's Cleveland production of Aida. As a teenager, she studied modern dance with Virginia Dryansky.

In 1964, McIntyre graduated from John Adams High School before attending Ohio State University. There, she first studied French with plans to become a linguist with the United Nations, but she became a dance major during her third year after taking a dance history course with Shirley Wynne. McIntyre recalled, "In my third year, I said, I have to stop fooling myself. [...] The dance-history courses really shifted me to say, Yes—go for it if that’s what you want to do." During her time at Ohio State, the university commissioned her to choreograph for an evening with Lucas Hoving, Doris Humphrey, and Anna Sokolow. In 1966, McIntyre attended the American Dance Festival where she would later return as a member of the faculty in the early 1990s and in 2008.

== Career ==
While taking graduate courses at Ohio State University, the head of the dance department, Helen P. Alkire put McIntyre's name up for a position at the University of Wisconsin, Milwaukee, where McIntyre was then hired. There, she choreographed for a year before moving to New York City in 1970.

In New York, McIntyre studied under Viola Farber and Gus Solomons Jr. among others. At a workshop with Anna Sokolow, the Nikolais Dance Theater, Judith Dunn, and Bill Dixon she found herself drawn to the connection between dance composition and avant-garde jazz and free jazz. She began to attend the rehearsals of jazz musicians, such as the Master Brotherhood, where she taught herself how to move to jazz. Her frequent attendance at the Master Brotherhood rehearsals earned her the nickname the "Cancer Dancer," because she was born in July. McIntyre cites "a feeling of that time in the Black Arts Movement" as the source of her passion for combining dance and live jazz. She explained that "many of us artists who were black, in whatever our particular field, we had a consciousness about what our work was saying for the moving forward of the consciousness about our race and our place in the society."

Upon moving to New York in 1970, McIntyre performed with the Gus Solomon Jr.'s dance company for two years. McIntyre held her first solo concert at the Clark Center for the Performing Arts. Under the mentorship of Louise Roberts, the director of the Clark Center, McIntyre founded the Harlem studio and company, Sounds in Motion, in 1972. She then held concerts at the Cubiculo Theatre and Washington Square Church while supporting her endeavors out of her own pocket.

=== Sounds in Motion ===
During this time, she worked part-time at the New York Public Library for the Performing Arts in the dance collection. Upon advice from others, McIntyre began applying for grants in order to fund her project when Sounds in Motion joined the National Endowment for the Arts dance-touring program. Sounds in Motion performed at venues such as the Joyce Theater, Brooklyn Academy of Music, and John F. Kennedy Center for the Performing Arts, as well as touring in Europe. During this time, works by Sounds in Motion included Life's Force (1979), created in collaboration with Ahmed Abdullah while Sounds in Motion was in residency, Take Off From a Forced Landing (1984), which was based on her mother's experiences as an aviator, and a performance in 1986 based on Zora Neal Hurston's 1937 novel, Their Eyes Were Watching God. During the 1970s and 1980s, Sounds in Motion was the only modern dance studio to be found in Harlem. The studio was a space where what McIntyre termed "the culture crowd," a label that included not only dancers and musicians, but scholars, activists, and artists from all fields, could gather and engage in furthering movement of Black consciousness. Many students who studied under McIntyre at the Sound in Motion studio went on to accomplish much in their own right, including Jawole Willa Jo Zollar, founder of Urban Bush Women.

Sixteen years after its founding, McIntyre closed Sounds in Motion in 1988 to pursue independent work. McIntyre is credited with encouraging renewed interest in the work of modern dance pioneer Helen Tamiris through a recreation of Tamiris' 1937 masterpiece, How Long, Brethren? in 1991. As a freelancer, McIntyre choreographed the Broadway productions of Mule Bone (1991), the original and revival of Paul Robeson (1988 and 1995 respectively), and King Hedley II (2001). Off-Broadway, McIntyre also choreographed Obie Award winner Ntozake Shange's Spell #7 at The Public Theater, and for London's West End, she choreographed King, the Musical. Her choreography has also been featured on television in HBO's Miss Evers' Boys (1997), for which she was nominated for an Emmy Award for Outstanding Choreography, and in the 1998 film Beloved, based on the novel of the same name by Toni Morrison. PBS profiled McIntyre in their 2001 three-part documentary, Free to Dance, a co-production between of the American Dance Festival and The John F. Kennedy Center for the Performing Arts.

In 2011, McIntyre acted as choreographer for the film Fun Size. In 2012, Sounds in Motion reunited at the American Dance Guild Festival where they performed Life's Force with Ahmed Abdullah. That same year, she choreographed Crowns at the Goodman Theatre in Chicago.

McIntyre has been a guest artist and teacher at numerous institutions including the American Dance Festival, Jacob's Pillow Dance, and the Bates Summer Dance Festival. She has also been on the faculty of Sarah Lawrence College.

=== Collaboration with Ntozake Shange ===
Ntozake Shange first met McIntyre as a student and performer at McIntyre's dance company, Sounds in Motion. Since then, the two of them have collaborated on a number of works including The Public Theater's 1979 production of Shange's Spell #7, in the 2007 New Federal Theatre's festival Ntozake Shange: A Retrospective, Shange's one-act play, It Hasn't Always Been This Way, and in 2012, Shange's choreopoem, and why i had to dance, produced by Oberlin College and Cleveland’s PlayhouseSquare. Before the premiere of why i had to dance, McIntyre joined Shange in her talk at Oberlin discussing Shange's 2011 work, lost in language & sound: or how I found my way to the arts. In 2013, Barnard College's Africana Studies Program and Consortium for Critical Interdisciplinary Studies hosted a two-day conference titled The Worlds of Ntozake Shange. At the event, McIntyre and Shange discussed their work together and the legacy of their collaboration. In 2014, McIntyre returned to Barnard to hold a movement workshop for a course on Ntozake Shange's work and influence. In 2014, McIntyre choreographed a new choreopoem by Shange which premiered at the Brooklyn and Kelly Strayhorn Theater in Pittsburgh, Pennsylvania.

== Selected works ==
- Life's Force (1979)
- spell #7 (1979)
- for colored girls who have considered suicide when the rainbow is enuf (1982)
- Take Off From a Forced Landing (1984)
- Their Eyes Were Watching God (1986)
- Langston Hughes: The Dream Keeper (1988)
- How Long, Brethren? (1991)
- Miss Evers' Boys (1997)
- Beloved (1998)
- It Hasn't Always Been This Way (2007)
- Joe Turner's Come and Gone (2009)
- Just Yesterday (2010)
- Open the Door Virginia! (2005)
- Front Porch Lies and Other Conversations (2007)
- Daughter of a Buffalo Soldier (2005)
- why i had to dance (2012)

== Awards and recognition ==
- 1989, 1997, 2006 Bessie Awards
- 1993, 1996 Helen Hayes Awards Resident Design
- 1997 Emmy Award for Outstanding Choreography
- 2006 Cleveland Arts Prize Lifetime Achievement Award for Dance
- 2007 John S. Guggenheim Fellowship
- 2008 Balasaraswati/Joy Ann Dewey Beinecke Chair for Distinguished Teaching
- 2009 Honorary Doctor of Fine Arts from State University of New York Purchase
- 2015 Doris Duke Impact Award Doris Duke Performing Artist Award
- 2016 Doris Duke Artist Award Doris Duke Performing Artist Award

== See also ==
- Black Arts Movement
- Choreopoem
- for colored girls who have considered suicide when the rainbow is enuf
- Katherine Dunham
- Ntozake Shange
- Zora Neal Hurston

== Newspaper mentions ==
- "Spell #7: A Geechee Quick Magic Trance Manual"
