= Joan Miller (choreographer) =

American dancer, choreographer, and educator

- Born: September 30, 1936; Harlem, New York City
- Died: March 23, 2014 (aged 77)
- Education: Brooklyn College; Teachers College, Columbia University; Juilliard School
- Occupations: Dancer, choreographer, educator
- Years active: 1970–2007
- Known for: Artistic director of the Joan Miller Chamber Arts/Dance Players

Joan Miller (September 30, 1936 – March 23, 2014) was an American dancer, choreographer, and educator. She was the artistic director of The Joan Miller Chamber Arts/Dance Players, a mixed-media dance company that used satire to make social commentary and provoke social change, from 1970 to 2007. Miller was also the founder and director of the dance program at Lehman College from 1970 to 2000.

== Early life ==
Joan Miller was born Joan Ann Bernadette Theresa Floissac on September 30, 1936, in Harlem, New York City, to Beryl and Hubert Floissac. Joan's mother, Beryl, was of Jamaican heritage while her father, Hubert, claimed ancestry from St. Lucia. She began dancing in a Girl Scout troop on 135th Street. After high school, Miller's parents encouraged her to pursue a stable occupation as an educator. She graduated from Brooklyn College in 1958 with an undergraduate degree in physical education. She received a master's degree in dance education from Teachers College, Columbia University, in 1960, directly followed by attending the Juilliard School on a John Hay Whitney fellowship.

== Career ==
In 1960s, at Juilliard, she began dancing with Ruth Currier's company. As a result, Miller danced as a guest artist with the companies of José Limón and Anna Sokolow and as a member of the Lincoln Center American Dance Theatre Company. During the summers, she had begun to study with modern dance choreographers Doris Humphrey and José Limón at Connecticut College, and with Louis Horst in New York. In 1964, Joan began to dance with the Rod Rodgers Dance Company. From 1965 to 1968, Miller danced with James Waring, Remy Charlip, Yvonne Rainer and Rudy Perez, artists who were associated with the Judson Dance Theater and avant-garde dance communities. Miller was one of the first choreographers to combine explicit references to race, gender, and social conflict with postmodern aesthetics derived from the Judson Church scene.

In 1969 she began to develop Robot Game, a critique of assimilation to normative modes of behavior. Robot Game was originally performed by Milton Bowser (later known as Abdel R. Salaam), founder and artistic director of Forces of Nature Dance Theatre, Chuck Davis (who founded his own company in 1968, and the African American Dance Ensemble in 1984), William R. Munroe, and Wanda Ward.

After a one-year appointment at Smith College, in 1963, she was hired to teach modern and folk dance at Hunter College's branch campus in the Bronx, which became Lehman College in 1968. In 1970, Miller became the director of Lehman's dance program, implementing a B.A. and B.F.A. at the first CUNY school to have a dance program. She would direct Lehman's dance program for the next thirty years. That same year, she founded her company, The Joan Miller Chamber Arts/Dance Players, and premiered her signature solo, Pass Fe White, which she had been working on since 1968. Joan curated professional artists from across New York City to teach in the dance department at Lehman, including Chuck Davis, Yon Martin, Miguel Godreau, Nadine Revine, Louis Falco, Juan Antonio, Rudy Perez, Nancy Topf, and John Parks. Among the choreographers Miller brought in to set work on the Lehman students were Eleo Pomare, Rael Lamb, Alvin Ailey (who choreographed his signature piece Revelations there), and later, Abdel Salaam.

In June 1975, the Joan Miller Chamber Arts/Dance Players performed in a week-long residency at the Ted Shawn Theatre at the Jacob's Pillow Dance Festival. By that time, the company had performed at the Delacorte Theatre, Japan House, the theatre at Riverside Church, Lincoln Center's Alice Tully Hall, New York University, Barnard College and the Hunter College Playhouse, in addition to regular engagements at Lehman College. William Moore (1933–1992), African American dance critic, dancer, researcher, and founder of Dance Herald magazine, managed the company at some point, as he did the company of Eleo Pomare. In 2005, the company hosted its 35th anniversary concert at the Citigroup Theater. It hosted its final concert in 2007 at the John Jay College theater.

== Recognition ==
Miller won several awards and citations, including the Thelma Hill Dance Award, Alpha Omega Theatrical Dance Company Award, the Living Legend Award, and a proclamation from the office of former mayor of New York, David Dinkins.

== Death ==
Miller died on March 23, 2014, at the age of 77.

== Noted works ==
- Protest (1960)
- Freudian Slips/Egomania
- Robot Game/Hereabout the Little Hazards (1969)
- Pass Fe White (1970)
- Homestretch (1972)
- The BUMPS (Black Upwardly Mobile Professionals)/Modern Black Businessman (1974)
- Thoroughfare (1974)
- Gender Hues
- Boots, Backtalk, and Beyond

== Press ==
Pass Fe White 1970

"Miller's Pass Fe White looks better every time I see it. The first section is especially fine. Not only does Miller whip through the dancing with a ferocious drive and focus but the choreography itself is taut and has no wasted places. Part of the reason for the strength is that while the taped voice reads a poem about "passing," the dancer in white racing outfit and goggles steams along her own track. She doesn't attempt to illustrate the poem, and as a result she illumines it."

"[Miller] uses all those elements and the theme is the inequities and oppressions of our society. Milton Bowser's solo is full of dissipating energy: tours, jetés, runs, a snatch of social dancing as the tape announces: 'I am the modern black businessman.' Bowser performs for us and looks frequently to see if we (the society?) approve. Eventually he collapses, exhausted. The tape: 'I am the black businessman, digging his grave.'"

== Quotes ==
"If I was part of the mainstream Black Aesthetic, I would have had more gigs, I would have been on more programs when they wanted collaborations and they wanted a series of Black choreographers. I wasn't asked because I didn't do the slave ship dance and I didn't do the—whatever our –we have our pool of subjects that we address. But I addressed none of them in a way that you knew this was a slave ship and we were all rowing."
