= Chester A. Reynolds =

American businessman

Chester Arthur Reynolds (1887 – December 11, 1958) was an American entrepreneur from Kansas City, Missouri, who served as the President of Lee Jeans and later founded the National Cowboy & Western Heritage Museum (formerly known as the National Cowboy Hall of Fame and Western Heritage Center).

== Career ==
Reynolds was involved in the business sector and held a leadership position at Lee Jeans, one of the leading denim manufacturers in the United States. During his tenure, he played a significant role in expanding the brand’s presence in the market.

In his later years, Reynolds sought to preserve and promote the cultural heritage of the American West. His vision led to the establishment of the National Cowboy Hall of Fame and Western Heritage Center in 1955, which was later renamed the National Cowboy & Western Heritage Museum. The museum, located in Oklahoma City, Oklahoma, is dedicated to preserving and interpreting the history of the American West through exhibits, educational programs, and research.

== Chester A. Reynolds Memorial Award ==
Named in his honor, the Chester A. Reynolds Memorial Award is presented annually at the National Cowboy & Western Heritage Museum’s Western Heritage Awards ceremony. The award recognizes individuals who have made significant contributions to Western culture and heritage.

== Legacy ==
Reynolds' efforts to preserve the traditions of the American West have had a lasting impact. The National Cowboy & Western Heritage Museum remains one of the most prominent institutions dedicated to Western heritage, attracting visitors from around the world.
