= For Colored Girls Who Have Considered Suicide / When the Rainbow Is Enuf =

1976 theatre piece by Ntozake Shange

for colored girls who have considered suicide / when the rainbow is enuf
- 1975 edition (publ. Shameless Hussy Press)
- Written by: Ntozake Shange
- Characters: Lady in Red; Lady in Blue; Lady in Purple; Lady in Yellow; Lady in Brown; Lady in Green; Lady in Orange
- Genre: Choreopoem; Tragedy

Premiere
- Date: September 15, 1976
- Place: Booth Theatre

for colored girls who have considered suicide / when the rainbow is enuf is a 1976 work by Ntozake Shange. It consists of a series of poetic monologues to be accompanied by dance movements and music, a form which Shange coined the word choreopoem to describe. It tells the stories of seven women who have suffered oppression in a racist and sexist society.

As a choreopoem, the piece is a series of 20 separate poems choreographed to music that weaves interconnected stories of love, empowerment, struggle and loss into a complex representation of sisterhood. The cast consists of seven nameless African-American women only identified by the colors they are assigned. They are the lady in red, lady in orange, lady in yellow, lady in green, lady in blue, lady in brown, and lady in purple. Subjects including rape, abandonment, abortion and domestic violence are tackled.

Shange originally wrote the monologues as separate poems in 1974. Her writing style is idiosyncratic and she often uses vernacular language, unique structure, and unorthodox punctuation to emphasize syncopation. Shange wanted to write for colored girls... in a way that mimicked how real women speak so she could draw her readers' focus to the experience of reading and listening.

In December 1974, Shange performed the first incarnation of her choreopoem with four other artists at a women's bar outside Berkeley, California. After moving to New York City, she continued work on for colored girls..., which went on to open at the Booth Theatre in 1976, becoming the second play by a black woman to reach Broadway, preceded by Lorraine Hansberry's A Raisin in the Sun in 1959. Shange updated the original choreopoem in 2010, by adding the poem "positive" and referencing the Iraq War and PTSD.

for colored girls... has been performed Off-Broadway as well as on Broadway, and was adapted as a book (first published in 1976 by Shameless Hussy Press), a 1982 television film, and a 2010 theatrical film. The 1976 Broadway production was nominated for the Tony Award for Best Play and the 2022 Broadway production was nominated for the Tony Award for Best Revival of a Play.

== Title ==
for colored girls who have considered suicide/when the rainbow is enuf is inspired by events in Shange's life. Shange admitted publicly to having attempted suicide on four occasions, at different times in her life, as early as her undergraduate years. In a phone interview conducted with CNN, she explained how she came to the title of her choreopoem: "I was driving the No. 1 Highway in Northern California and I was overcome by the appearance of two parallel rainbows. I had a feeling of near death or near catastrophe. Then I drove through the rainbow and I went away. Then I put that together to form the title." The colors of the rainbow then became the essence of the women in the choreopoem, named only after their color pseudonyms.

Shange also explains that she chose to use the word "colored" in the title of her choreopoem so that her grandmother would be able to understand it.

== Poems ==
- "dark phrases" – Lady in Brown with Ladies in Red, Blue, Orange, Green, Yellow and Purple
- "graduation nite" – Lady in Yellow with Ladies in Blue, Green and Red
- "now i love somebody more than" – Lady in Blue with Ladies in Yellow, Blue, and Green
- "no assistance" – Lady in Red
- "i'm a poet who" – Lady in Orange with Ladies in Red, Yellow, Green, Blue, Purple and Brown
- "latent rapists'" – Ladies in Red, Blue, Purple
- "abortion cycle #1" – Lady in Blue
- "sechita" – Lady in Purple
- "toussaint" – Lady in Brown
- "one" – Lady in Red
- "i usedta to live in the world" – Lady in Blue
- "pyramid" – Lady in Purple
- "no more love poems #1" – Lady in Orange
- "no more love poems #2" – Lady in Purple
- "no more love poems #3" – Lady in Blue
- "no more love poems #4" – Lady in Yellow
- "my love is too" – Ladies in Red, Orange, Yellow, Green, Blue, Purple, Brown
- "somebody almost walked off wid alla my stuff" – Lady in Green
- "sorry" – Ladies in Red, Orange, Yellow, Green, Blue, Purple, Brown
- "positive" – Ladies in Red, Yellow, Purple, Brown
- "a nite with beau willie brown" – Lady in Red, Orange
- "a laying on of hands" – Ladies in Red, Orange, Yellow, Green, Blue, Purple, Brown

== Synopsis ==
Structurally, for colored girls is a series of 20-22 poems, depending on whether "my love is too" and "positive" are included in the list, collectively called a choreopoem. Shange's poetry expresses many struggles and obstacles that African-American women may face throughout their lives and is a representation of sisterhood and coming of age as an African-American woman. The poems are choreographed to music that weaves together interconnected stories. The choreopoem is performed by a cast of seven nameless women only identified by the colors they are assigned. They are the lady in red, lady in orange, lady in yellow, lady in green, lady in blue, lady in brown, and lady in purple. Subjects from rape, abandonment, abortion, and domestic violence are tackled. By the end of the play these women come together in a circle, symbolizing the unity they have found sharing their stories.

- "dark phrases" – Lady in Brown with Ladies in Red, Blue, Orange, Green, Yellow and Purple

The prologue of the choreopoem "dark phrases" begins with the lady in brown describing the "dark phrases of womanhood". All she hears are screams and promises. Each woman states where she is from, by stating they are outside their respective cities. The lady in brown proclaims that this piece is all for "colored girls who have considered suicide / but moved to the ends of their own rainbows". The women then begin to sing children's nursery rhymes, "mama's little baby likes shortnin, shortnin". Then all the ladies start to dance to the song "Dancing in the Street".

- "graduation nite" – Lady in Yellow with Ladies in Blue, Green and Red

The lady in yellow says it was graduation night and she was the only virgin. She was out driving around with her male friends who she has known since the seventh grade in a black Buick, laughing about graduation. After a fight breaks out, the lady in yellow and Bobby leave and end up having sex in the back of the Buick. The other ladies start talking about their sexual preferences.

- "now i love somebody more than" – Lady in Blue with Ladies in Yellow, Blue, and Green

The lady in blue talks about how she used to participate in dance marathons frequently. One night she refused to dance with anyone that only spoke English. Throughout the monologue she intertwines English and Spanish. During this time she discovered blues clubs. She says she became possessed by the music. She ends her monologue by calling it her poem "thank-you for music," to which she states: "I love you more than poem". She repeats "te amo mas que," and the other women join her, softly chanting.

- "no assistance" – Lady in Red

The lady in red addresses an ambiguous "you" throughout the monologue. She has loved this "you" strongly and passionately "for 8 months, 2 wks, & a day" without any encouragement. She decides to end this affair and leaves a note attached to a plant that she has watered every day since she met this person.

- "i'm a poet who does not like you" – Lady in Orange with Ladies in Red, Yellow, Green, Blue, Purple and Brown

The lady in orange begins by saying she does not want to write in neither English nor Spanish, but she only wants to dance. She forgets all about words when she starts to dance. She says "we gotta dance to keep from cryin and dyin" and the other ladies repeat her words. The lady in orange then claims that she is a poet "who writes in english / come to share the worlds witchu".

- "latent rapists'" – Ladies in Red, Blue, Purple

The lady in blue talks about how hard it is to press charges against a friend. The other women begin to ponder and ask questions. They say that maybe it was a misunderstanding, or the woman caused it, and they ask her if she was drinking. The lady in red states that society only believes someone is a rapist if they are a perverted stranger. The women talk about male friends of theirs who have nice smiles and buy them dinner but end up raping women. The women all share the experience of having been violated by a man they knew while being on the lookout for "the stranger we always thot it wd be". The lady in red states that the "nature of rape has changed." The lights change, the women react to an imaginary slap.

- "abortion cycle #1" – Lady in Blue

The lady in blue sets the scene with tubes, tables, white washed windows, and her legs spread open. She could not bear to have people looking at her while she got an abortion so she is all alone.

- "sechita" – Lady in Purple with Lady in Green

The lady in purple describes Sechita's life in the bayou, while lady in green dances out Sechita's life. She is dressed up for the Creole carnival celebration. She embodies the spirit of her namesake, Sechita, the Egyptian goddess of creativity, love, beauty and filth from the 2nd millennium.

- "toussaint" – Lady in Brown

The lady in brown describes falling in love with Toussaint L'Ouverture, finding Toussaint in the library near the train tracks. The lady in brown talks about entering a contest to see which "colored child" could read 15 books in three weeks and the lady in brown won, but she was disqualified because she went into the adult reading room and read about Toussaint instead of reading the children's books. The lady in brown became obsessed with Toussaint despite the fact that he was dead. He was her "secret lover at age 8". The lady in brown wanted to run away to go to Haiti with Toussaint. On her journey the lady in brown meets a young boy whose name is Toussaint Jones. The lady in brown feels likes she has met her real-life Toussaint and she leaves with him.

- "one" – Lady in Red

The lady in red enters begins by describing a beautiful woman wearing orange butterflies, silk roses, and aqua sequins. This woman is deliberate in all her actions. Although she walked slowly to allow men to gaze at her, she never returned their interest with a smile or acknowledging their catcalls. She was "hot / a deliberate coquette". Her goal was to be unforgettable. She takes "those especially schemin/ tactful suitors" to go home with her. In the morning, she becomes her ordinary self by washing off the glitter and the grime from the night before. She asks her lovers to leave. The men would leave in a hurry, and then she cleaned up and put her roses away. She would write about her exploits in her diary and then, cry herself to sleep.

- "i usedta to live in the world" – Lady in Blue

The lady in blue begins her monologue by explaining that she used to live in the world but now only lives in Harlem, and her universe is only six blocks. She used to walk all over the world and now her world is small and dirty. The lady in blue says that when she used to live in the world where she was nice and sweet but now, now she cannot bring herself to be nice to anyone in this "six blocks of cruelty / piled up on itself".

- "pyramid" – Lady in Purple

The lady in purple joins the ladies in blue, yellow, and orange. She starts by describing them as three friends who shared every aspect of their lives. They remember a time when they all were attracted to the same man, but he only could choose one of them. The one who he chose loved him, but worried if her friends could hold out. One day she found the rose she left on his pillow on her friend's desk. The friend said she did not know what was going on, because the man said he was free. The three friends did not want to hurt one another but they know how wonderful this man could be. The friends hug and cry and go to confront the man, whom they find with another woman. The women cry and comfort each other like sisters.

- "no more love poems #1" – Lady in Orange

The lady in orange discusses a relationship that left her heartbroken. She says that ever since she realized that someone would call a "colored girl an evil woman a bitch or a nag" (56) she has tried not to be that person. She tries to not only give joy, but to receive it as well. She finds herself in what she believes to be a real and honest relationship. Yet, the guy keeps going back to his ex-lover. The lady in orange tried to move on by finding another lover, but she was not satisfied. She tried to avoid sadness, but she found herself heartbroken by this man. She could not stand being "sorry & colored at the same time / it's so redundant in the modern world".

- "no more love poems #2" – Lady in Purple

The lady in purple speaks about her relationship to dance and men. She deliberately chooses to dance with men who do not speak English, pops pills, and uses dance as an escape from reality. Then she meets a man who she gave everything: dance, fear, hope and scars. She admits she was ready to die, but now is ready to be herself and accept love. She pleads, "lemme love you just like i am / a colored girl/ i'm finally bein real".

- "no more love poems #3" – Lady in Blue

The lady in blue proclaims that they all deal with too much emotion and that it might be easier to be white. That way they could make everything "dry & abstract wit no rhythm & no / reelin for sheer sensual pleasure". The lady in blue states that they should try to control their feelings and she is going to take the first step by masturbating. However, she finds that this makes her feel lonely and does not know where to look to feel whole.

- "no more love poems #4" – Lady in Yellow

The lady in yellow claims to have lost touch with reality because she used to think she was immune to emotional pain, but she realized she is not. She gave her dance, but her dance was not enough. She says "bein alive & bein a woman & bein colored is a metaphysical / dilemma / i haven't conquered yet".

- "my love is too" – Ladies in Yellow, Brown, Purple, Blue, Orange, Red, Green

The other women come and each repeats, "my love is too...delicate/beautiful/sanctified/magic/saturday nite/complicated/music to have thrown back in my face." The ladies begin dancing and chanting together.

- "somebody almost walked off wid alla my stuff" – Lady in Green

The lady in green says that someone has taken all of her "stuff". She feels that she is the only one that knows and can appreciate the value of her stuff. She describes her stuff as the way she sits with her legs open sometimes, her chewed up fingernails, her rhythm, her voice, her talk, her "delicate leg and whimsical kiss". The person who stole her stuff is a man. She made too much room for this man who has run off with her stuff, especially because he does not even know that he has it. By the end of the monologue she demands her stuff back from this man.

- "sorry" – Ladies in Red, Orange, Yellow, Green, Blue, Purple

The ladies start talking about all the apologies they have received from men. Some examples include: he is sorry because he does not know how she got your number, sorry because he was high, sorry because he is only human, and sorry because he thought she could handle it. The lady in blue then declares that she does not need any more apologies. She goes on to say that men should keep their apologies for themselves, because she does not need them to soothe her soul and she cannot use them. Rather than accepting apologies, she is going to do whatever she wants: yell, scream, and break things. And she will not apologize for any of it.

- "positive" – Ladies in Red, Yellow, Purple, Brown

Lady in yellow, purple, brown, red participate in reciting the next poem about contracting HIV/AIDS; they share the lines and all speak to one woman's experience. The ladies argue about suspicions of cheating in the relationship. The lady in yellow tells her friends how happy she is in her relationship, and her friend tells her they have seen her lover outside the gay bars. The lady in yellow protests, but her friend tells her to get tested. The lady in yellow goes to get tested to put the whole issue to bed. Two weeks later, the doctor calls the lady in yellow with her patient number (#7QYG9) to inform her that she is HIV positive. The lady in yellow confronts her lover who furiously tells her he is not gay and accuses her of cheating on him. She tells him to get tested but he gets angrier and violent. He throws her to the ground and when she wakes up he is gone and she says, "& i was positive / & not positive at all".

- "a nite with beau willie brown" – Lady in Red, Orange

The lady in orange begins the story of Willie Brown by saying there is no air. Beau Willie is all tied up in the sheets, wishing a friend would come over and bring him some blow or any other kind of drug. The lady in red continues the story, saying that Beau Willie claims there is nothing wrong with him. Beau Willie tried to get veterans' benefits but he cannot read, so he starts driving a cab around the city, but the cops always give him a hard time and he is not making any money. The lady in orange and red say that Crystal is pregnant again and Beau beats Crystal almost to death when he hears about her pregnancy. Beau Willie has wanted to marry Crystal since she was 14, but now she laughs in his face saying she will never marry him. She has the baby and there are now two kids, Naomi and Kwame. Crystal ends up getting a court order to keep Beau away from her and the children. Beau Willie comes to the house despite the court order and while he is there he becomes apologetic saying he just wants to marry her and give her things. The two children run to their father as Crystal watches. Suddenly, he grabs the kids and pushes the screen out of the window. Beau Willie tells Crystal she has to agree to marry him. Naomi and Kwame scream and Crystal, at the moment, can only whisper. Beau Willie drops the kids out of the window and they die.

- "a laying on of hands" – Ladies in Red, Orange, Yellow, Green, Blue, Purple, Brown

The ladies begin the last poem saying that they are missing something: a "layin on of hands". The hands are strong, cool, moving, and make them whole and pure. The lady in blue says she feels the gods coming into her, laying her open to herself. She goes on to say that she knows about laying her body open for a man, but still she was missing something. Finally, all the ladies repeat the lines she says, "i found god in myself / & i loved her / I loved her fiercely". They sing to each other and then the audience, and close into a tight circle with each other. The choreopoem ends with lady in brown modifying her earlier statement: "& this is for colored girls who have considered suicide/ but are movin to the ends of their own rainbows."

== Production history ==
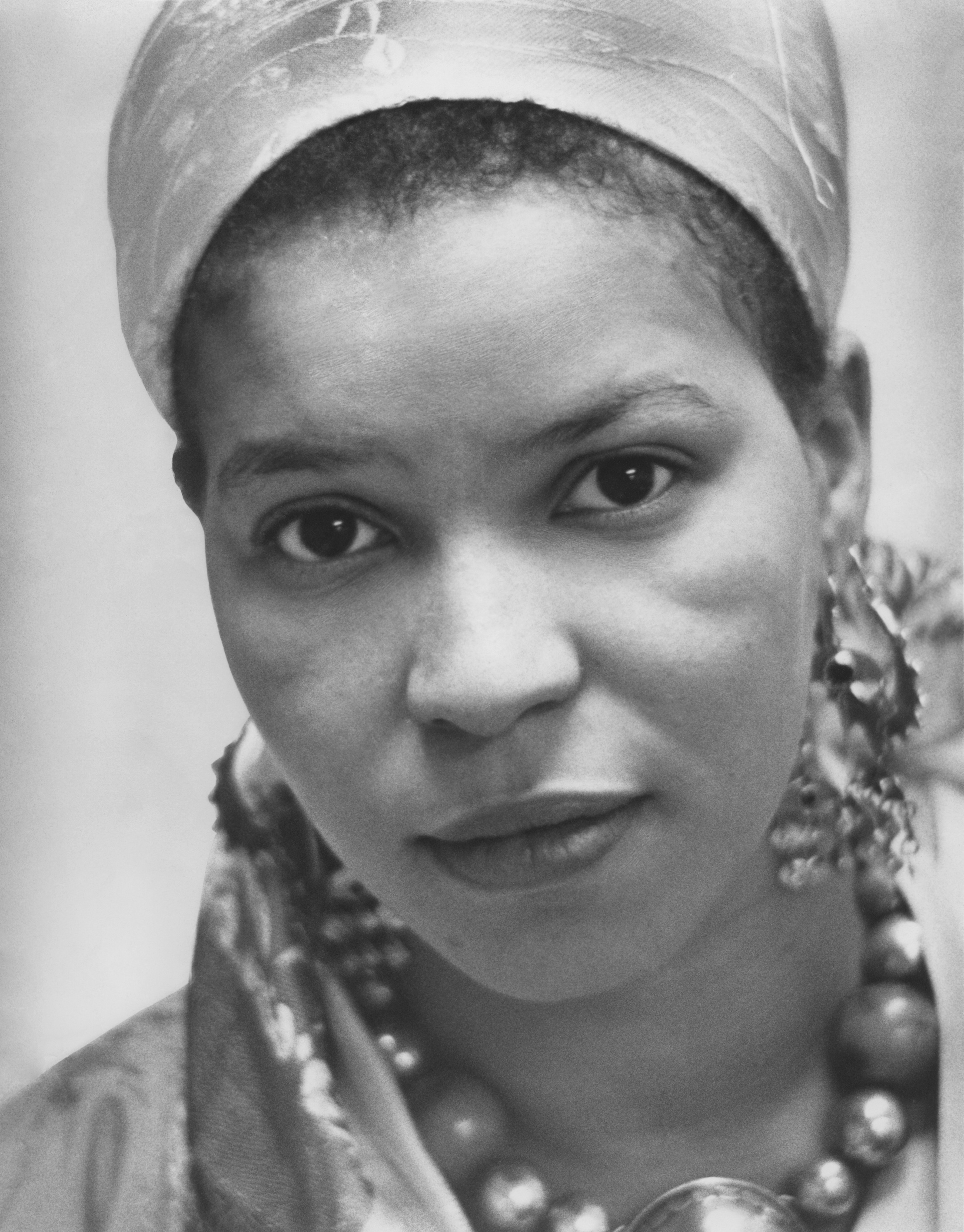
Ntozake Shange, author of for colored girls

for colored girls... was first performed by Shange with four other artists at the Bacchanal, a women's bar, outside Berkeley, California. About six months after performing the work in California, Shange and her collaborator, Paula Moss, decided to move across the country determined to perform it in New York City's downtown alternative spaces. At the age of 27, Shange moved to New York, where, in July 1975, the reworked for colored girls was professionally produced in New York City at Studio Rivbea in 1975. East coast audiences were soon able to experience Shange's performance piece at other venues including the Old Reliable, and DeMonte's beginning in July 1975 and then starting in March 1976 at the Henry Street Settlement's New Federal Theatre. The show grew increasingly popular, especially among African-American and Latino audiences. As a result, for colored girls who have considered suicide/when the rainbow is enuf opened at The Public Theater in June 1976. Three months later, in September, the show was performed at the Booth Theater on Broadway, where it was continued until July 1978 and ran for 742 shows. Shange performed as the "lady in orange" at the Broadway opening. It was also published in book form in 1977 by Macmillan Publishing, followed by a Literary Guild edition in October 1977 and Bantam Books editions beginning in 1980. A cast recording was also released by Buddah Records.

From February to July 1978 the production, presented by the Adelaide Festival Centre Trust and several American entrepreneurs, toured Australia. It was staged first at Her Majesty's in Adelaide, South Australia, as part of the 10th Adelaide Festival of Arts, before touring to Melbourne, Sydney, Townsville, Cairns, and Brisbane, for two- to four-week runs. Original cast members Alfre Woodard, Trazana Beverley, Laurie Carlos, Aku Kadogo, Carol Maillard, and Lynn Whitfield featured in the show, while it was directed by Oz Scott.

In 1982 for colored girls... was adapted for television on WNET-TV, PBS, as part of The American Playhouse series. Although for colored girls went from a play production to television one, this production was dubbed a "telefilm" instead of a teleplay as the performance on WNET-TV was seen as a serious departure from the Broadway production.

The cast of "for colored girls..." at a production held at the Yard Theatre in Hackney, 2026

In 2009 Tyler Perry announced that he would produce Shange's for colored girls who have considered suicide/when the rainbow is enuf. The film was the first project for 34th Street Films, Perry's new production company housed in Lionsgate The cast included Loretta Devine, Kimberly Elise, Whoopi Goldberg, Janet Jackson, Phylicia Rashād, Anika Noni Rose, Kerry Washington and Thandiwe Newton. Originally using the play's full title, the film's title was shortened to For Colored Girls in September 2010.

In the fall of 2019, The Public Theater revived the play. The production was directed by Leah C. Gardiner, with choreography by Camille A. Brown and included Sasha Allen as Lady in Blue, Adrienne C. Moore as Lady in Yellow, Jayme Lawson as Lady in Green, Okwui Okpokwasili as Lady in Green, and deaf actress Alexandria Wailes as Lady in Purple. On July 29, 2021, it was announced the Public Theater's staging of the play would be produced on Broadway in 2022. It was later announced that the production would be directed and choreographed by Brown. It began previews on April 1, 2022 and officially opened on April 20 at the Booth Theatre. On May 3, it was confirmed that the revival would close on May 22, several months ahead of schedule; it was subsequently extended to June 5. The cast features D. Woods, Amara Granderson, Tendayi Kuumba, Kenita R. Miller, Okwui Okpokwasili, Stacey Sargeant, and Alexandria Wailes.

2026 Milestone Revivals

To commemorate the 50th anniversary of the play's development and journey, several prominent productions were staged. In London, The Yard Theatre adapted the play, to mark the anniversary. The production was directed by Diane Page and included Nadine Higgin as Lady in Blue, Tatenda Matsvai as Lady in Yellow/Lady in Green, Ibilola Rossi as Lady in Brown, Cherrelle Skeete as Lady in Red and Alex Thomas-Smith as Lady in Purple/Lady in Orange.The production involved choreography by Ingrid Mackinnon. The soundtrack was composed by Grime MC Jammz. The production was paired with many creative promotional events, including a Burlesque night, a film club, and a ticketed conversation between the production director and English author Bernadine Evaristo.

In the United States, Daryl Stewart Productions also mounted a high-concept, multi-disciplinary revival. Co-directed by Daryl Stewart and Justin Dominic, the production initially debuted as a special, single-night, two-show presentation at The Newark Museum of Art in June of 2026. Following its initial success, the ensemble was invited to perform in September at the historic street co-naming ceremony of "Ntozake Shange Way" on Monroe Street, in Bed-Stuy, Brooklyn, honoring the playwright's enduring legacy.

By November 2026, the Daryl Stewart Productions revival moved to the Mile Square Theatre in Hoboken, New Jersey, for a limited, two-week engagement. Notably, Trazana Beverley, the original Broadway "Lady in Red", who won a Tony Award for the role in 1977, joined the production's creative staff, serving as an acting coach and performance consultant. The US revival cast includes Zaria Monae as Lady in Brown, Dr. Lynn Irby Hill as Lady in Red, Positive as Lady in Blue, Camille Upshaw as Lady in Green, Brissae Valdes as Lady in Yellow, Madison Star Brim as Lady in Orange and CiMa as Lady in Purple.

== Adaptations ==
=== American Playhouse ===
In 1982, the play was adapted for television on PBS station WNET-TV, as part of the American Playhouse. The adaptation, directed by Oz Scott, was seen as a serious departure from the Broadway production. A review by The New York Times states: "What Miss Shange prefers to call a choreopoem has been expanded into realistic settings that too often resemble the sanitized atmosphere of an episode of Good Times. The net result has been a considerable reduction in the work's emotional impact." As a result, the televised production is often seen as a diluted version of the original choreopoem.

Cast

- Sarita Allen: Sechitaa
- Trazana Beverley: Crystal (credited as Trazana Beverly)
- Laurie Carlos: Georgetta
- Gregory T. Daniel: Toussaint
- Jackie Davis: Second Man in Subway
- Pedro De Pool: Emcee
- Lisa Henley: Naomi
- Roger Hill: Second Man at Barbecue
- Brent Jennings: First Man at Barbecue
- Charles Johnson: Boy in Subway
- Oliver Lake: Flute Player
- Jack Landron: Bedroom Companion
- Crystal Lilly: Sarah
- Carol Maillard: Lu Anne (as Carol L. Maillard)
- Ntozake Shange: Woman with baby girl/Lady in Brown
- Alfre Woodard: Woman who lost her stuff
- Lynn Whitfield

=== Theatrical film ===
On March 25, 2009, the film industry magazine Variety reported that Nzingha Stewart, a Black female director, had acquired feature film rights from Shange and that Lionsgate had signed Stewart to write and direct a film adaptation.

Stewart, at Lionsgate's direction, approached Tyler Perry about producing. However, Perry told Lionsgate that if he produced it, he also wanted to write and direct. Perry then usurped the project from Stewart and scrapped her script. The shift prompted controversy over whether Perry had the skill and consciousness to properly depict an iconic feminist work. Stewart remained on in the token position of executive producer. Among those critics were Oprah Winfrey, who expressed doubts over whether the book should be made into a film at all. Others had reservations based on Perry's position at the helm of such an important book in African American literature, particularly considering the controversies raised by Precious, a film he lent his name to.

On September 3, 2009, Lionsgate announced it had acquired distribution to Perry's 34th Street Films adaptation, with filming originally scheduled to take place in Atlanta, Georgia, in November and December 2009. The film, retitled For Colored Girls, stars Thandie Newton, Loretta Devine, Kimberly Elise, Whoopi Goldberg, Janet Jackson, Phylicia Rashad, Anika Noni Rose, Kerry Washington, Tessa Thompson, Michael Ealy, Macy Gray and Omari Hardwick. Mariah Carey was also cast, but dropped out in May 2010, citing medical reasons.

When asked if she held reservations about Perry's adaptation of her work, Shange responded: "I had a lot of qualms. I worried about his characterizations of women as plastic." In reference to post-production, she stated that "I think he did a very fine job, although I'm not sure I would call it a finished film."

== Awards and nominations ==
=== Original Off-Broadway Production ===
Year	Award	Category	Nominee	Result
1977	Theatre World Award		Trazana Beverley	Won
1977	Obie Award	Distinguished Production	Ntozake Shange, Oz Scott, and Cast	Won

=== Original Broadway Production ===
Year	Award	Category	Nominee	Result
1977	Tony Awards	Best Play	Ntozake Shange	Nominated
1977	Tony Awards	Best Featured Actress in a Play	Trazana Beverley	Won
1977	Drama Desk Award	Outstanding Actress in a Play	Trazana Beverley	Nominated
1977	Drama Desk Award	Outstanding Director of a Play	Oz Scott	Nominated
1977	Drama Desk Award	Outstanding Lighting Design	Jennifer Tipton	Won
1977	Drama Desk Award	Unique Theatrical Experience		Nominated
1977	Theatre World Award		Tania Robins	Won

=== 2022 Broadway Revival ===
Year	Award	Category	Nominee	Result
2022	Tony Awards	Best Revival of a Play		Nominated
2022	Tony Awards	Best Featured Actress in a Play	Kenita R Miller	Nominated
2022	Tony Awards	Best Director of a Play	Camille A Brown	Nominated
2022	Tony Awards	Best Choreography	Camille A Brown	Nominated
2022	Tony Awards	Best Costume Design of a Play	Sarafina Bush	Nominated
2022	Tony Awards	Best Lighting Design of a Play	Jiyoun Chang	Nominated
2022	Tony Awards	Best Sound Design of a Play	Justin Ellington	Nominated
2022	Drama Desk Awards	Outstanding Revival of a Play		Nominated
2022	Drama Desk Awards	Outstanding Featured Actress in a Play	Kenita R Miller	Nominated
2022	Drama League Awards	Outstanding Revival of a Broadway or Off-Broadway Play		Nominated
2022	Drama League Awards	Outstanding Director of a Play	Camille A. Brown	Nominated
2022	Drama League Awards	Distinguished Performance	Kenita R Miller	Nominated
2022	Outer Critics Circle Awards	Outstanding Revival of a Play (Broadway or Off-Broadway)		Nominated
2022	Outer Critics Circle Awards	Outstanding Director of a Play	Camille A. Brown	Nominated
2022	Outer Critics Circle Awards	Outstanding Choreography	Camille A. Brown	Nominated
2022	Chita Rivera Awards	Outstanding Choreography in a Broadway Show	Camille A. Brown	Nominated
2022	Chita Rivera Awards	Outstanding Ensemble in a Broadway Show		Won
2022	Chita Rivera Awards	Outstanding Female Dancer in a Broadway Show	Tendayi Kuumba	Won

In addition to receiving several accolades, the play has been described as a landmark piece in African American literature and black feminism. It has since become a cornerstone of black feminist writing and 20th-century drama.

== Legacy ==
The title of For Colored Boys Who Have Considered Suicide When the Rainbow is Still Not Enough: Coming of Age, Coming Out, and Coming Home, a 2012 anthology of essays edited by Keith Boykin, was based on the title of Shange's play. Shange's work has also been transformed using different forms of media. It has been continually performed in colleges and universities, art spaces, and theaters throughout the world. It has been set in beauty shops, prisons, and other historical time periods. A Brazilian production dropped the word "color" in the title, and a group of women in Kentucky made it about class instead of race. In a Season Four episode of A Different World, Freddie (Cree Summer) performs a segment from the play during an audition for the fictionalized Hillman College theater production, where show director Whitley (Jasmine Guy) rejects the piece, sarcastically commenting, "Now I know why colored girls consider suicide."

== Poster art and design ==
The poster for the play and book (as pictured above) are by the New York-based graphic artist, Paul Davis.

== Main source ==
- Shange, Ntozake (2010). for colored girls who have considered suicide/when the rainbow is enuf. Simon & Schuster. ISBN 9781439186817.
