= Choreopoem =

Art form combining poetry, dance, music, and song

A choreopoem is a form of dramatic expression that combines poetry, dance, music, and song. The term was first coined in 1975 by American writer Ntozake Shange in a description of her work, For Colored Girls Who Have Considered Suicide / When the Rainbow Is Enuf. Shange's attempt to depart from traditional western poetry and storytelling resulted in a new art form that doesn't contain specific plot elements or characters, but instead focuses on creating an emotional response from the audience. In Shange's work, nontraditional spelling and African American Vernacular English are aspects of this genre that differ from traditional American literature. She emphasizes the importance of movement and nonverbal communication throughout the choreopoem so that it is able to function as a theatrical piece rather than being limited to poetry or dance.

The "XX Chromosome Genome Project" by S. Ann Johnson is a contemporary example of a choreopoem. It combines poetry, song and dance to illuminate the commonalities and differences between women of various cultures. In this choreopoem, Johnson writes about eight women in search of self-acceptance and liberation. These colorfully dressed women, who are named after flavors of foods, represent international cultures around the world through music, spoken word, and movement.

Another contemporary artist championing the choreopoem is Monica Prince, author of How to Exterminate the Black Woman ([PANK], 2020), and the forthcoming Roadmap (SFWP 2023). Prince teaches the art of the choreopoem at Susquehanna University.

== History ==
Ntozake Shange innovated the genre in 1974 in Berkeley, California at the women's bar “Bacchanal”. It was in the Bay where she was working with a group of women that consisted of dancers, musicians, and poets. During this time, Shange trained in dance with Sawyer, Ed Mock, and Halifu Osumare, who were credited with helping usher Shange into her passion for dance. The concept of choreopoem initially descends from ancient West and Central African traditions however, Shange's modern and diasporic configuration of the practice stemmed not only from an homage to her African roots, but also from her participation in women's studies, dance, and poetry, which all conflated to create her Black American and Atlantic interdisciplinary genre.

Influenced by women from the Black Arts Movement, based on Black Nationalism that encouraged black separatism, and the feminist arts movement, which focused on using art of various mediums as acts against war and in favor of civil and queer rights, Shange was inspired by the Black Arts Movement and the many women of the movement in the late 1960s who were using their work to challenge the Black Aesthetic's disposition and centering of Black patriarchy and masculinity. Thus, her genre and praxis created an explorative and central space for Black Women's various and complex experiences, in a personal, familiar, yet crafted language and voice. Her genre of choreopoem substantiated processes of narrative creation beyond what existed in both European Western theatrical dance practices and in the Black Theatre tradition alike. She understood and criticized the Black Theatre tradition's role in recreating Eurocentric frameworks of creativity and thought within Black communities. She urged Black artists to look to Afrocentric, interdisciplinary, and alternative forms of artistic communication and structures instead.

During summer 1974, while working with choreographer Paula Moss, Shange created about twenty poems that were understood as a larger choreographic project. During this time, her first formal, published, and most renowned choreopoem for colored girls who have considered suicide/when the rainbow is enuf, was developed. Working closely with choreographer Dianne McIntyre, Shange was able to confront her childhood experiences through movement. McIntyre helped to choreograph for colored girls with Shange, as they wanted to convey awareness and community through dance. The inclusion of movement and dance in a choreopoem was as essential to her as the poetry aspect. Shange described that "with dance (she) discovered (her) body more intimately than (she) had imagined possible." Shange’s emphasis on dance was a result of her experience with African dance and movement classes as well as her exposure to Santeria through dance and music as it relates to African dance.

Shange found that Black performance art as a theatrical practice was more suited for the abstract interdisciplinary work she was creating, compared to that of prior Western theatrical traditions. Chorepoem in its nature creates an intersection between the physical materiality of the written poems and the embodied meaning, rhythms, sounds, and experiences embedded within them, thereby creating new possibilities, new theatrical traditions, new languages, new narratives, and new worlds. After for colored girls, Shange continued to explore and utilize choreopoem, creating works such as boogie woogie landscapes (1977), From Okra to Greens/A Different Kinda Love Story: A Play/With Music & Dance (1978), Spell #7 (1979), and A photograph: lovers in motion (1979). Many other artists including her friend and collaborator Dianne McIntyre have also innovated within the choreopoem genre, which has also become increasingly popular and inspirational among younger generations of artists, proving the immense and ongoing creative impact it had, particularly on women of color artists.

== Choreopoems by Ntozake Shange ==
- for colored girls who have considered suicide/ when the rainbow is enuf (1975)
- A Photograph: Lovers in Motion (1977)
- Boogie Woogie Landscapes (1979)
- Spell #7 (1979)
- Daddy Says (1989)

== Choreopoems by other authors ==
- How to Exterminate the Black Woman by Monica Prince ([PANK], 2020)
- Roadmap (SFWP, 2023)
- I Am A Black American by Peter Shaffer
- Langston by Tom Krusinski
- "Love Soup" by Tom Krusinski
- XX Chromosome Genome Project by S. Ann Johnson
- You're All I Need To Get By written by Sababu Norris and Dr. James Mumford, choreographed by Nina Butts, and performed by Hampton University's Department of Speech Communications and Theatre Arts (1985)
- For Black Boys Who Have Considered Suicide When the Hue Gets Too Heavy written by Ryan Calais Cameron first performed in London in 2021
- FOR COLORED BOYZ (on the verge of a nervous breakdown / when freedom ain't enuff) written by Bryan-Keyth Wilson.
- PURPLE: A Ritual in Nine Spells written and choreographed by Sydnie L. Mosley
