= Bess =

Bess or BESS may refer to:

== People and fictional characters ==
- Bess (name), a given name, nickname and surname, including lists of people and fictional characters so named
- Bess (singer), Finnish singer Essi Miia Marianna Launimo (born 1993)

== Geography ==
- Mount Bess, on the border between Alberta and British Columbia, Canada
- Lake Bess, Florida, United States

== BESS ==
- Basic Enlisted Submarine School, the United States Navy's school for enlisted submariners
- Battery energy storage system
- BESS (experiment) (balloon-borne experiment with superconducting spectrometer), a particle physics experiment

== Other uses ==
- List of storms named Bess
- Delta Bessborough or The Bess, a hotel in Saskatoon, Saskatchewan, Canada
- Bess Press, an American publisher
- Bess (Dane), legendary Danish general mentioned in Gesta Danorum
- Bess beetle, a family of beetles
- Porgy and Bess, American opera by George Gershwin
- Secure Web SmartFilter EDU, formerly called Bess, a brand of web filtering software

== See also ==
- BES (disambiguation)
- Besse (disambiguation)
- Brown Bess, nickname of a British Army musket
- Old Bess (beam engine)
