= Besse =

Besse may refer to:

== Places ==
- Besse, Cantal, France
- Besse, Dordogne, France
- Besse, Isère, France
- Besse-et-Saint-Anastaise, Puy-de-Dôme, France
  - Super-Besse, a ski resort
- Besse-sur-Issole, Var, France
- Bessé, Charente, France
- Bèssè, Benin
- Besse, in Koko/Besse Local Government Area, Kebbi State, Nigeria

== People ==
- Bernard of Besse (13th century) French Friar Minor and chronicler
- Besse Cooper (1896–2012), American suffragette and supercentenarian
- Besse Day (1889–1986), American statistician
- Bessé´, fossilised woman (~70,000 years old) at Sulawesi, Indonesia
- Georges Besse (1927–1986), French businessman
- Joseph Besse (1683—1757), English writer, author of Quaker Sufferings

== See also ==
- Bess (disambiguation)
- Bess (name)
- Bese (disambiguation)
- Bessey (surname)
- Bisse (surname)
