= Bessy =

Bessy may refer to:

== People ==
- Claude Bessy (dancer) (1932–2026), French ballerina with the Paris Opera Ballet and director of its school (1972–2004)
- Claude Bessy (writer) (1945–1999), French writer, magazine editor, singer, video producer and painter
- Cyril Bessy (born 1986), French cyclist
- Frédéric Bessy (born 1972), French cyclist
- Bessy Argyraki (born 1957), Greek pop singer
- Bessy Gallardo (born 1984), Chilean politician

== Other uses ==
- BESSY, a synchrotron facility in Germany
- Bessy, Aube, France, a commune
- Bessy (comics), a Belgian comics series (1952-1997), and the title character, a female collie

== See also ==
- Bessy-sur-Cure, Yonne, France
- Bernard Frénicle de Bessy (c. 1604–1674), French mathematician
- Bessie (disambiguation)
