= Betsey =

Betsey may refer to:

- Betsey (ship); one of many vessels that have been named Betsey
- Betsey Island, Tasmania, Australia

== People ==
- Betsey Armstrong (born 1983), female water polo goalkeeper from the United States
- Betsey Bayless, the Republican Secretary of State of Arizona 1997–2003
- Betsey Guppy Chamberlain (1797–1886), Native American writer of sketches and poetry
- Betsey Mix Cowles (1810–1876), early leader in the United States abolitionist movement
- Betsey Johnson (born 1942), American fashion designer
- Betsey Ann Stearns (1830-1914), American inventor
- Betsey Stevenson, economist, Associate Professor of Public Policy at the University of Michigan
- Betsey Stockton (1798–1865), African-American educator and missionary
- Betsey Cushing Roosevelt Whitney (1908–1998), American philanthropist, daughter-in-law of President Franklin D. Roosevelt
- Betsey Wright (born 1943), American lobbyist, activist, and political consultant who worked for Bill Clinton in Arkansas
- Betsey Wynne (1778–1857), the main author of the extensive Wynne Diaries, wife of the Royal Navy officer Thomas Fremantle (1765–1819)

== Other ==
- Betsey Brown, African-American literature young-adult fiction novel by Ntozake Shange, published in 1985
- XOX Betsey Johnson, American reality television series on the Style Network
- Betsey Trotwood, fictional character from Charles Dickens' 1850 novel David Copperfield

== See also ==
- Bese (disambiguation)
- Bete (disambiguation)
- Betsy
