= Besen =

Besen or Bešen is a surname. Notable people with the surname include:

- Gabrijela Bešen-Bartulović (born 1994), Croatian handball goalkeeper, sister of Lucija
- Lucija Bešen (born 1994), Croatian handball goalkeeper, sister of Gabrijela
- Marcus Besen (1923–2023), Australian businessman and philanthropist
- Sunny Besen Thrasher (born 1976), former Canadian child actor
- Ümit Besen (born 1956), represents the darker side of Tarabya school of electronic music
- Wayne Besen (born 1970), American gay rights advocate

== See also ==
- Bese (disambiguation)
- Bessens
