= Toalean culture =

Indigenous peoples of Sulawesi

Toalean Culture
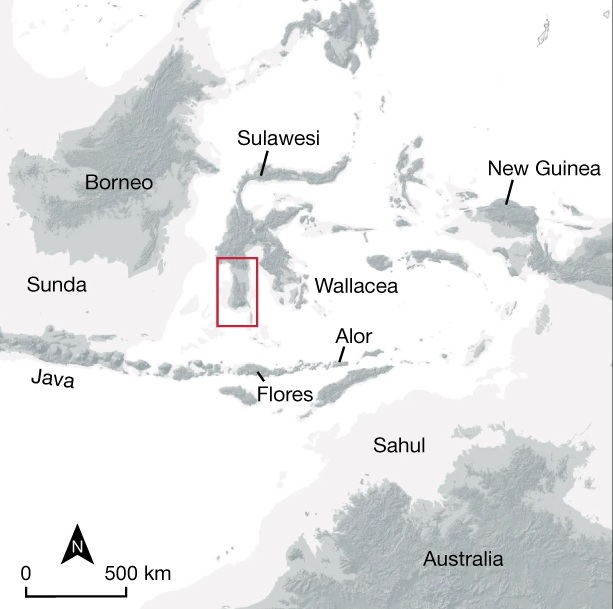
- Geographical range: Southern Sulawesi, Indonesia
- Period: Mid Holocene, Mesolithic Indonesia
- Dates: c. 7000 BCE – c. 500 CE
- Major sites: Leang Panninge (4°46′28″S 119°56′23″E), Leang Bulu' Sipong
- Followed by: Austronesian migrants

The Toalean (or Toalian or Toala in Indonesian) people were hunter-gatherers who inhabited the Indonesian island of Sulawesi during the Mid- to Late-Holocene period prior to the spread of Austronesian Neolithic farmers some 3,500 years ago from mainland Asia.

The term 'Toalean' was assigned by the earliest excavators from the local Bugis word 'Toaleʼ' meaning "forest people", cognate to Proto-Austronesian *Cau-ni-Salas or Proto-Malayo-Polynesian *tau-ni-halas "forest people". The term is misleading as later research has found the Toalean culture to be unrelated to the later forest-dwelling people of southern Sulawesi. The Toalean culture is recognised by the presence of refined bone points, backed microliths, large amounts of shells (especially the freshwater gastropod Tylomelania perfecta), small denticulate stone 'Maros points', and an absence of the ground stone technologies that characterise later local cultures. Toalean artefacts are often associated with skeletal remains of Sulawesi warty pigs. Few examples of Toalean art have been found, and these are limited to portable examples including an engraved bone point from Ulu Leang 1 and a painted shell at Leang Rakkoe. No Toalean cave art has been identified.

== Chronology ==
The earliest peopling of Sulawesi is considered to be related to a wave of migration through Indonesia around 45 thousand years ago, during which some people remained in the area while others continued on to eventually reach Sahul. A number of related Pleistocene sites in the area are known for their rockart. These sites predate the Toalean culture, and an absence of archaeological sites dated to the intervening period between 12-8kya prevent a direct link.

Prior to a standardised chronology, three phases of Toalean culture have been roughly classified as:

- The Early Toalean phase, between 7500–5500 BP, which saw the emergence of bone points and microliths.
- The Late Preceramic Toalean phase, dating to 5500–3500 BP, marked by the appearance of Maros Points.
- The Ceramic Toalean phase, from 3500–2000 BP, which saw traces of the emerging Neolithic culture.

Neolithic-period, Post-Toalean changes in the archaeological assemblages are characterised by ceramics, ground-edge axes, and rice-farming are seen to represent the arrival of Austronesian-speaking or Nusantoa migrants.

== Discovery ==
In 1902, Swiss naturalists Paul and Fritz Sarasin excavated several caves in the highlands of southern Sulawesi. Their work uncovered distinctive and finely crafted stone implements, arrowheads, and small tools fashioned from bone.

Australian archaeologist Fred McCarthy continued excavations in the late 1930s with an interest in the typological similarities between the finely made, serrated Toalean Maros points, and Australia's broadly contemporary "small tool tradition". A series of poorly documented excavations throughout the later 20th century noted serrated artefacts, earthenware sherds, and bone. Some 6,000 artefacts were given to Jakarta's National Museum with uncertain attributions to excavations at Panganreang Tudea and Batu Ejaya by Van Stein Callenfels and Willems.

Excavations of both cave sites and open sites in Southern Sulawesi are ongoing. In October 2023, the team discovered 7,000-year-old tiger shark-tooth knives, the earliest evidence of shark teeth being used in composite weapons worldwide.

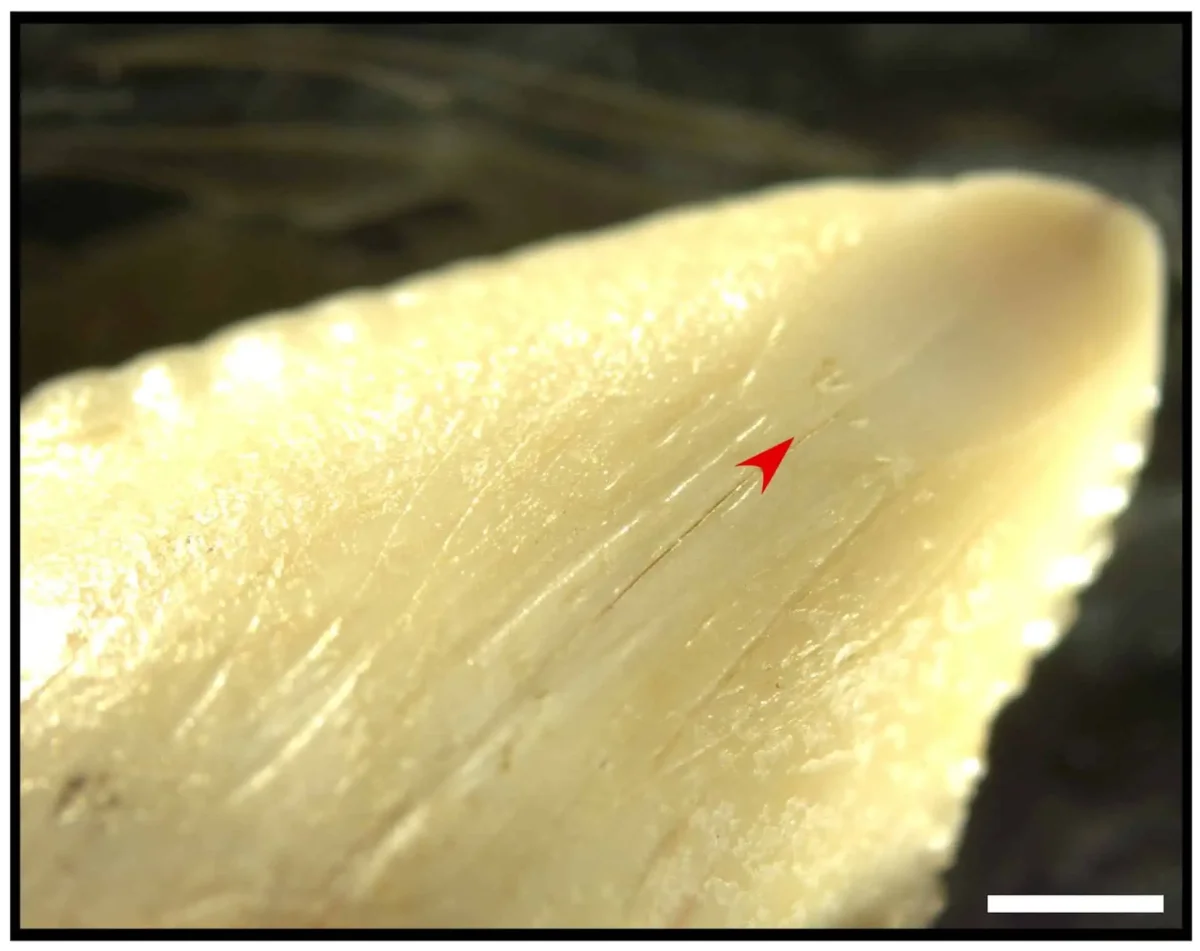
Use-related features of the Leang Panninge shark tooth found in Sulawesi, Indonesia

== Location and extent ==
Known Toalean sites are largely concentrated in the southern third of the southwest peninsula of Sulawesi, in the caves of the limestone karst system, that runs through the lowland plains of the Maros and Pangkajene dan Kepulauan (or 'Pangkep') regencies, to the north-east of Makassar. The southern extent includes Selayar Island. As of 2021, no Toalean sites have been found north of Lake Tempe.

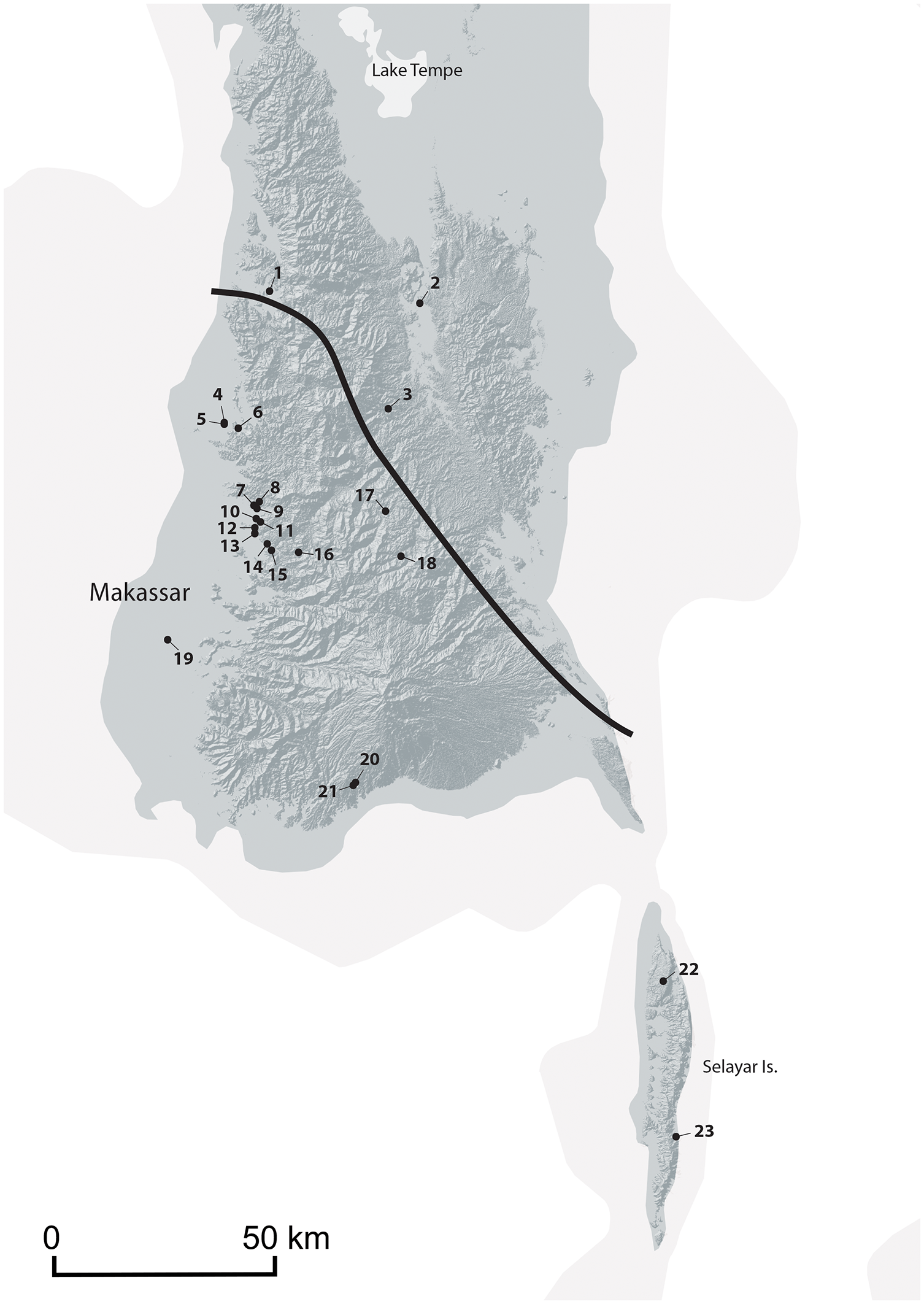
Map of South Sulawesi, Indonesia, showing sites identified with Toalean artefacts. Map by K. Newman & Y.L.Perston

=== Leang Panninge ===
The cave site of Leange Panninge ("Bat Cave") contains dense Toalean assemblages including 138 unbroken backed microliths (many with a regular lozenge shape), Maros points, and various stone scrapers. An intact burial with associated stone tools was discovered in 2015. The Leang Panninge site was designated as a cultural heritage by the Maros Regency Culture and Tourism Office on July 25, 2019.

=== Leang Bulu' Sipong ===
Leang Bulu' Sipong 1 is a low-lying limestone cave at the foot of a limestone karst system on the coastal plains of Pangkep Regency. Excavations here uncovered some 212 retouched points, sawlettes, and bone points that may have been used as fishing spears. The Toalean cave site is less than 100m from the Late Pleistocene rock art site Leang Bulu' Sipong 4 which features a figurative painting of a Sulawesi warty pig (Sus celebensis) dating to at least 43,900 years ago (based on Uranium-series dating).

=== Leang Cakondo ===
The upper chamber of Leang Cakondo in Lamoncong was the main site excavated by the Sarasins in 1902. The densest artefact assemblage, between 10 and 40 cm in depth, contained projectile points, Maros point flake tools with retouched serrated edges, plus bladelets and bone points.

=== Leang Burung ===
A major excavation by a joint Australian-Indonesian Archaeological Expedition in 1969 uncovered Toalean artefacts in various contexts. One trench dated to between 3500–4700 years ago contained 24 Maros points, 24 other stone points, and 19 bone points. A separate trench dated earlier than 3460 years ago contained a ceramic Toalean assemblage with 963 pot sherds, 57 miscellaneous stone points, 51 backed blades, 52 geometric microliths, only 7 Maros points and no more than 7 bone points. Fragments of human bone from secondary burials were also found and judged to date to between 1000 and 2000 years ago.

== Lithic technologies ==
Toalean assemblages include several diagnostic artefact types that distinguish them from earlier or later deposits. These include the hollow-based lithic 'Maros points' with denticulated edges, pirri points, small 'bone' points, backed microliths, and sawlettes.

Archaeologists from Griffith University, the University of New England and the Balai Arkeologi Sulawesi Selatan conducted an analysis of the morphological and technological features of 1,739 Toalean-age lithic artefacts from the limestone caves and shelters of Leang Pajae, Leang Rakkoe, Leang Panninge, Leang Bulu' Sipong 1, Leang Bulu Bettue, Leang Jarie, Leang Lambatorang, and Leang Lompoa, and the open site of Tallasa to form a standardised system of Toalean stone tool classification. This study further divided Maros points into four sub-classes: classic Maros Points, Mallinrung Points, Lompoa Points, and Pangkep Points. The majority of Toalean stone tools from these sites were made on chert, with a small percentage made on limestone or other materials.

The Bulu' Sipong sawlettes are tiny backed microliths with narrow denticulations that were carefully formed using a thin pressure flaker. These were first identified by Muhammad Nur (Unhas) and David McGahan (Griffith University) during their excavation of the Leang Bulu' Sipong 1 cave site in 2018 with further examples found at Leang Jarie. Their function is currently unknown.

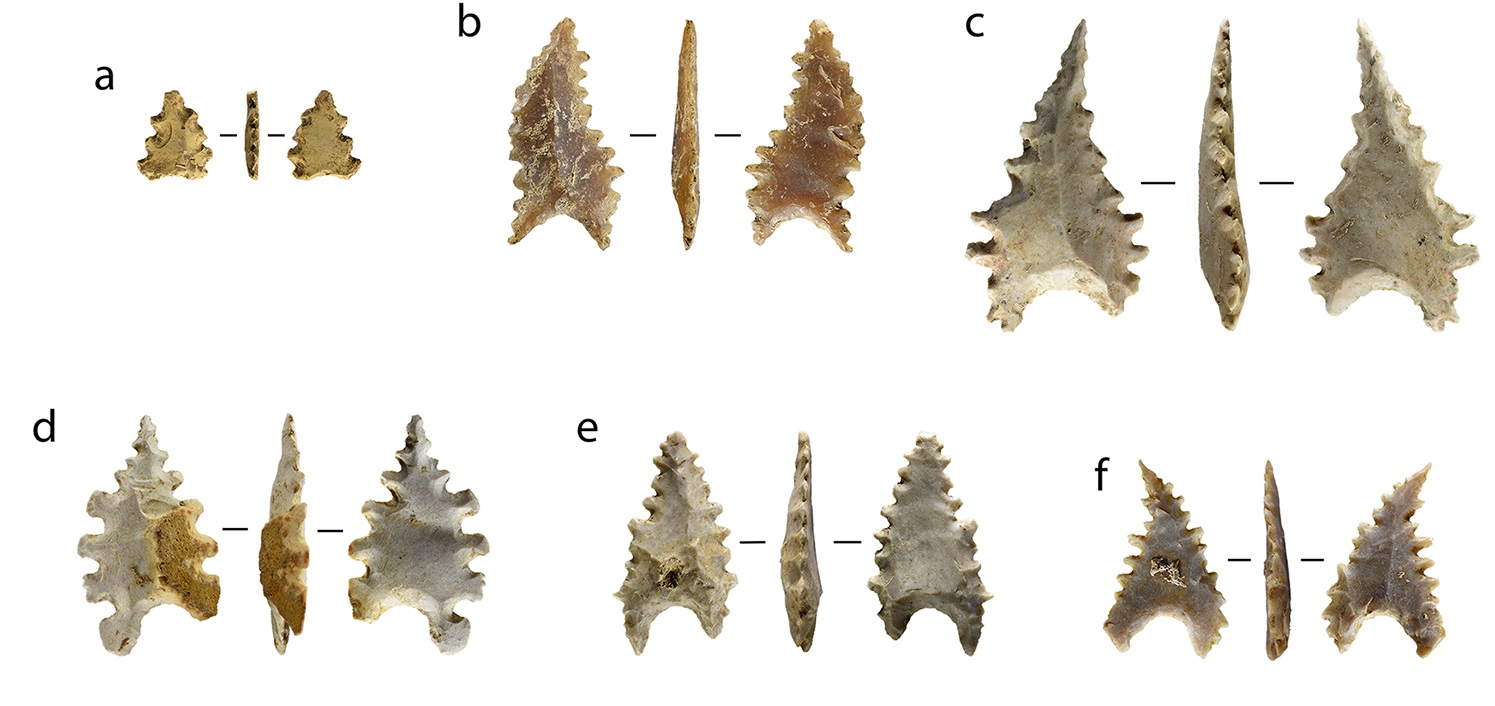
Classic Maros Points with basal indents and denticulated margins.

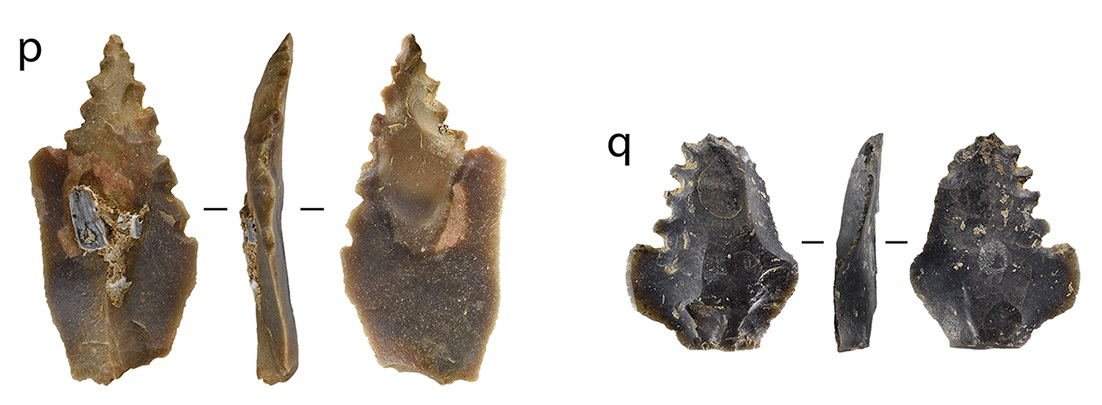
Mallinrung Points have denticulated margins without a basal indent

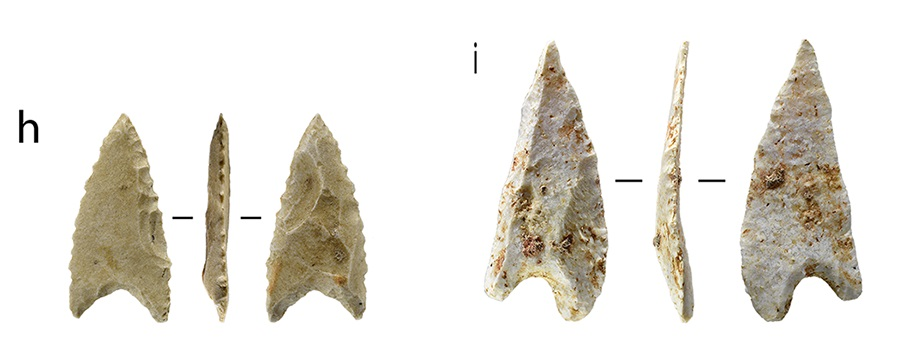
Lompoa Points are a type of Maros point with a basal indent and without denticulations.

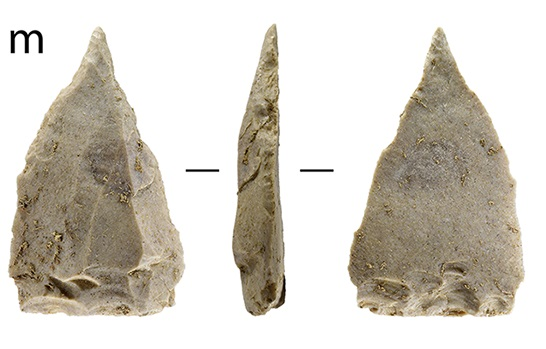
Pangkep Points are Maros Points without denticulations and no basal indent.

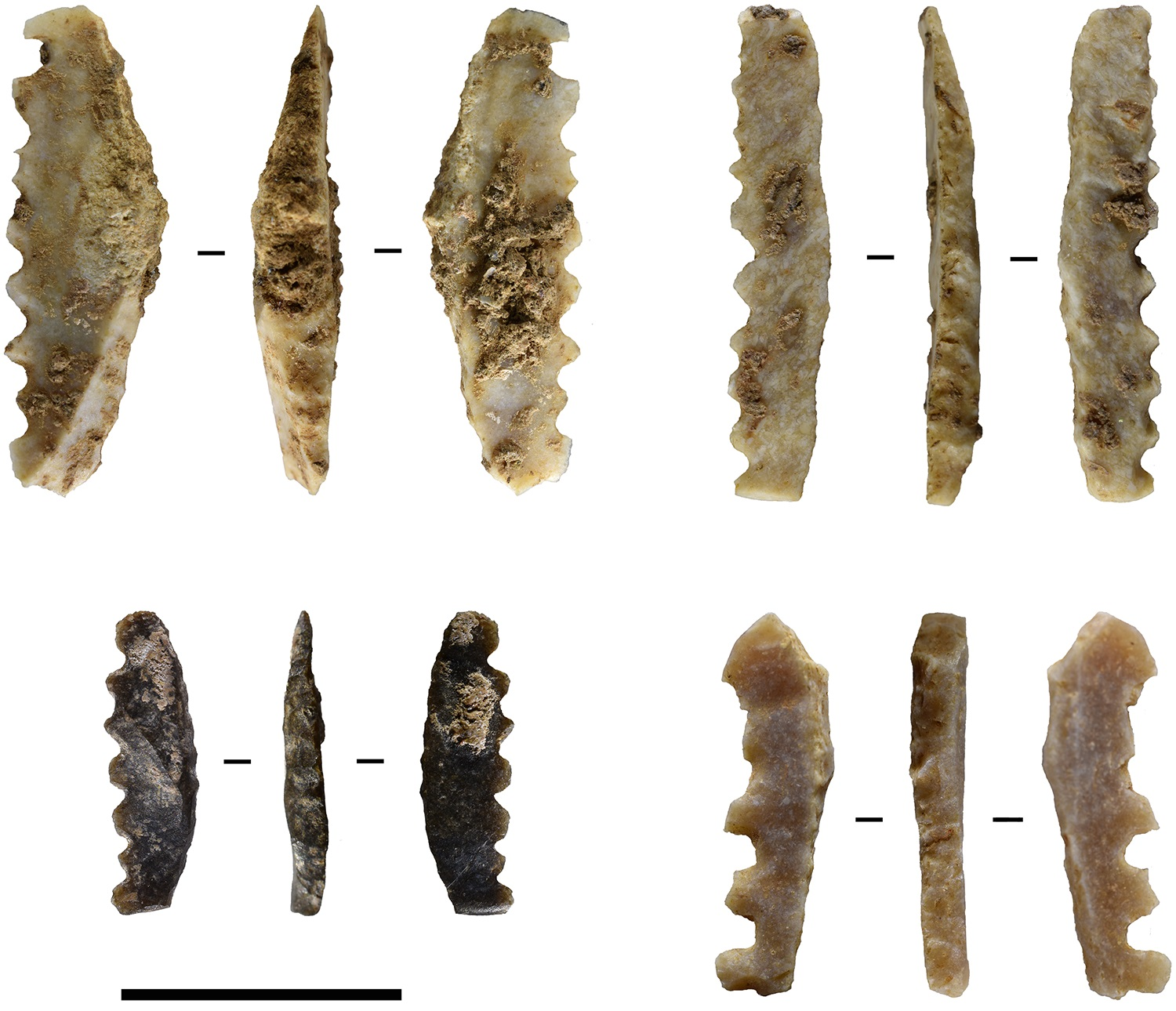
Sawlettes are a distinctive stone tool associated with the Toalean technocomplex.

== Skeletal remains of Bessé' ==
Archaeologists from the University of Hasanuddin in Makassar first discovered human remains at Leang Panninge in the Mallawa district of Maros. In 2015, excavations uncovered the first relatively complete human burial from a secure Toalean context. The burial provided an example of modern human evolution in southeast Asia. The remains were identified as belonging to a young female hunter-gatherer who was aged around 17–18 years at her time of death. Her discoverers named her Besséʼ (pronounced bur-sek), a nickname bestowed on newborn princesses among the Bugis people who now live in southern Sulawesi.

Bessé' was buried in a foetal position and partially covered by large cobbles. Her cause of death is unknown with no obvious signs of injuries or infections that leave their mark in bone. Stone tools (including Maros points) and red ochre were found in her grave, along with the bones of animals known to be hunted. The skull was crushed post-mortem. Burial was dated to 7.3–7.2 kyr cal BP by 14C dating of a galip nut seed (Canarium sp).

DNA from the inner ear bone of Bessé' provided the first direct genetic evidence of the Toaleans. Genomic analysis shows Bessé' belonged to a population with a previously unknown ancestral composition. She shares about half of her genetic makeup with present-day Indigenous Australians and people in New Guinea and the Western Pacific, along with a previously unknown divergent human lineage that branched off approximately 37,000 years ago (after Onge-related and Hòabìnhian-related lineages) including substantial DNA inherited from the now-extinct Denisovans.
