= Lake Ruby =

- Location within Florida
- Location: Polk County, Florida
- Coordinates: 27.9711°N 81.6623°W
- Type: natural freshwater lake
- Basin countries: United States
- Max. length: 4,385 feet (1,337 m)
- Max. width: 3,690 feet (1,120 m)
- Surface area: 259 acres (105 ha)
- Surface elevation: 125 feet (38 m)
- Settlements: Winter Haven, Florida

Lake Ruby is a natural freshwater lake in the suburbs southeast of Winter Haven, Florida. Lake Ruby has a 259-acre (1,050,000 m^{2}) surface area. It is one block south of Cypress Gardens Boulevard. Lake Ruby Drive borders most of the lake's north side. All of the west shore, the southwest shore and the northeast shore is bordered by gated residential communities. The south side of the lake is bordered by private land and just to the east-southeast is Lake Bess. A narrow strip of land, at its narrowest point 40 feet (12 m), separates the two lakes.

Although Lake Ruby is large, the public has access to it only along a section about three blocks wide on the north shore, along part of Lake Ruby Drive. There are no public swimming areas or public boat ramps. The lake shore can be accessed on the north by those wishing to fish. The Hook and Bullet website says the lake contains bullhead, gar and bowfin.
