= Sassafrass, Cypress & Indigo =

1982 novel by Ntozake Shange

- Book dedication: "Sassafrass, Cypress & Indigo is dedicated to all women in struggle."
- Author: Ntozake Shange
- Genre: Novel
- Published: 1982
- Publication place: USA
- Pages: 224 pp (1982 hardcover); 207 pp (2010 paperback)
- ISBN: 0-312-69971-9 (1982 hardcover); 978-0-312-54124-8 (2010 paperback)
- Dewey Decimal: PS3569.H3324 S2 1982
- Preceded by: For Colored Girls Who Have Considered Suicide/When the Rainbow is Enuf
- Followed by: Betsey Brown

Sassafrass, Cypress & Indigo is a 1982 novel written by Ntozake Shange and first published by St. Martin's Press. The novel, which took eight years to complete, is a story of three Black sisters, whose names give the book its title, and their mother. The family is based in Charleston, South Carolina, and their trade is to spin, weave, and dye cloth; unsurprisingly, this tactile creativity informs the lives of the main characters as well as the style of the writing. Sassafrass, Cypress & Indigo integrates the whole of an earlier work by Shange called simply Sassafrass, published in 1977 by Shameless Hussy Press. As is common in Shange's work, the narrative is peppered with interludes that come in the form of letters, recipes, dream stories and journal entries, which provide a more intimate approach to each woman's journey toward self-realization and fulfillment. The book deals with several major themes, including Gullah/Geechee culture, women in the arts, the Black Arts Movement, and spirituality, among many others.

== Plot summary ==
The story starts with Indigo, the youngest daughter of the family, sitting among her beloved hand-made dolls, which each have names and personalities that emerge over the course of the novel. Before the reader learns much about the other sisters or mother, Indigo begins menstruating, is gifted an old fiddle by Uncle John, and consequently initiated into a cult-like group of pre-adolescent boys called the Jr. Geechee Captains. Indigo's first section is full of informal mappings, remedies, and tales such as "Moon Journeys: cartography by Indigo" and "To Rid Oneself of the Scent of Evil: by Indigo". Soon, some of those cartographies are replaced by recipes as the family prepares for and celebrates Christmas, with the ever-present spirit of Daddy, the girls' father, wafting through their annual traditions. Sassafrass and Cypress are back from school in New England and New York City, respectively, and the reader won't see the four women together again until the very last pages of the book.

The reader next meets Sassafrass in Los Angeles, where she lives with Mitch, a struggling and self-destructive jazz saxophonist. Sassafrass is working to find her creative niche, still weaving and cooking, but pining to get to an artists' colony in New Orleans. She eventually leaves Mitch in LA, moving to San Francisco to live with her younger sister Cypress. Sassafrass exists on the periphery of Cypress' bright and full world for some time, planning to dance and write in hopes of regaining herself outside of Mitch's abuse. After a while, Sassafrass returns to LA and Cypress decides to pursue a professional dance career, which eventually lands her back in New York City.

There, the middle sister finds community among feminist and/or lesbian dance collectives, along with a new way of expressing through her body. Idrina, along with Ixchell, Laura, Celine and others, become important characters in Cypress' image of herself, and after breaking off an intense romantic relationship with Idrina, the dancer found herself unmoving and frequenting late-night dive bars. Coincidentally, in one of those bars Cypress found Leroy McCullough, an old musician friend from San Francisco. After a fateful night together, Cypress and Leroy seemingly reinvigorate each other's creativity, living and loving together until Leroy leaves for a summer European tour. During Leroy's absence, Cypress revisits Idrina and recounts an arguably post-apocalyptic dream where women are punished for childbirth and men are locked away.

During that same summer, Cypress joins a dance company that raises money to support the Civil Rights Movement and Leroy asks to marry her before she starts on her first tour with the group. The reader is then taken back into Sassafrass’ world, where she has been living in The New World Found Collective with Mitch for over a year. There, Sassafrass is undergoing the process of initiation into santería as Mitch slips further into a downward spiral. To shake the bad spirit of her man, Sassafrass performs a sort of exorcist as the deity Oshun came into her body and she decides to return home to the South, without Mitch.

Finally, the reader re-enters Indigo’s spheres, where she has been studying violin and midwifery in her Charleston town. Sassafrass has come home and is in labor, with Indigo delivering the baby and Cypress and Mama close at hand, coaxing "a free child" into their world.

== Background/style ==
Sassafrass, Cypress & Indigo is set in Charleston, South Carolina, with major influences from the Sea Islands off the coast of South Carolina, Georgia, and Florida. The Sea Islands, comprising over 100 land masses along the southeastern coast of the United States are home to Gullah culture, sometimes also referred to as Geechee culture. The Gullah represent a unique community of African-descendant Americans; since slaves of various African ethnic groups were brought to the region, they remained relatively isolated from the rest of the contiguous 50 states and developed a distinct culture that included a creolized language and distinguishable africanisms. The slaves brought to the Sea Islands, who were primarily from western Africa, particularly Sierra Leone, cultivated rice, indigo, and cotton on the islands as early as the 17th century. Since then, a culture based on agriculture and featuring several direct links to an African heritage has developed and sustained these communities; their language, use of African names, rice-based cuisine, and reliance on African folktales and craftwork all connect them to the African continent in a way unlike any other region in the United States.

Notably, Gullah communities privileges what is often deemed "women's work" by Western standards — weaving, cooking, and storytelling are all key elements of Gullah life and this female-centered culture greatly inform Shange's feminist writing in the novel. Gullah culture also emphasizes the potential for symbiosis between human life and the natural world, contributing to the important Gullah value of self-sufficiency. The oral and physical knowledge passed down from generation to generation include recipes, remedies, and tales of various natural or supernatural events that both link Gullah culture to Africa and distinguish its isolation within American culture. Sassafrass, Cypress & Indigo borrows from these traditions and reflects an emphasis on the role of women in a society’s functioning, particularly through the sharing of recipes and ways of taking care of oneself and others.

Gullah culture paired with influences from the Black Arts Movement create the cultural context for the novel (Artistic Expression). Shange employs Gullah culture as a point of departure for understanding these women’s lives in the late 20th century and historicizes their experiences as artists against the backdrop of the Black Arts Movement, which "asserted blackness as a countercultural force in opposition to the Eurocentric ideology of white supremacy", but often excluded women from its mainstream. In addition, Shange’s reliance on music, particularly jazz, also reflects a harkening back to the Black Arts Movement, where distinctly "black" forms such as jazz were celebrated. While these influences inform the content of the novel, they are also reflected in Shange’s prose and structural choices, demanding a new kind of reading from her audiences

== Key characters ==
- Indigo: The youngest daughter of the family. Indigo seems to possess a certain magic that is sometimes attributed to "the South in her". She indicates strong relationships with a spiritual realm through her dolls and her interactions with the natural world. The formation of her character contributes greatly to Sassafrass, Cypress & Indigo being read as a magical realist text.
- Cypress: Middle daughter. Cypress is a dancer that struggles with the body norms of the white ballet world, but eventually finds herself as an artist among more political, modern dance circles. She journeys through lovers across the country and sells drugs for a stint to support herself before marrying Leroy at the end of the book. She especially connects with Mama and those around her through music and food, two important themes in much of Shange's work.
- Sassafrass: Eldest daughter. Sassafrass dutifully carries on Mama's tradition of textile weaving, Sassafrass grapples with interpersonal relationships interfering with her art and eventually relies on santería to pull her out of a negative, abusive space. Her relationship with Mitch informs the majority of her young adult life and she is re-centered after returning home to South Carolina to give birth.
- Mama/Hilda Effania: Family matriarch. Mama is an anchor for her girls as they explore themselves and their artistries. Through her letters, her voice, with its Southern wisdom and often old-fashioned conventions, is a constant backdrop to the sisters' journeys throughout the story. She is home for each of her daughters and they depend upon her stability as they adventure toward self-realization. The mother-daughter relationships in the Sassafrass, Cypress & Indigo contribute to a larger theme of female relationships in many Shange texts.
- Daddy: Mama's deceased husband; Sassafrass, Cypress, and Indigo's father. Although Daddy is already dead at the start of the novel, he maintains a strong presence in the family's home life and serves as Mama's confidante, strengthening the family's ties to more spirit-filled worlds. Notably, his distinct absence allows the family's home to be a strictly female space.
- Mitch: Sassafrass' longtime abusive boyfriend. Mitch, an often volatile jazz musician who loves Sassafrass, catalyzes much of the eldest sister's life until the very end of the novel. Mitch was orphaned at age eight and seems incapable of reciprocating the intimacy Sassafrass directs toward him.
- Leroy: Cypress' boyfriend, and eventual husband. Leroy, also a jazz musician, comes from a wealthy St. Louis family, but was left parentless at age 18 when his parents were supposedly burned to death. The product of expensive, integrated prep schools, Leroy studied music at prestigious institutions before meeting Cypress. Although he is initially introduced to the reader as a love interest for Sassafrass, he and Cypress are married by the end of the novel.
- Aunt Haydee: Community healer; Indigo's guide. Aunt Haydee, who can be seen as another matriarch figure in the novel, has "gone to the moon a lot" and unquestioningly trusts Indigo to find her way in a world filled with magic and spirits. Throughout Indigo's life, Aunt Haydee provides guidance and teaches Indigo what she knows about midwifery, which becomes Indigo's primary trade by the end of the novel.
- Sister Mary Louise: One of Indigo's adult friends. Another female role model for young Indigo, Sister Mary Louise performs a ritual with Indigo upon her first menses and entertains both the girl and her dolls. She tells Indigo about the ways of the South at that time and helps shape Indigo's transition from girlhood to womanhood.
- Uncle John: Neighborhood figure; friend of Indigo. Uncle John, known as "the junk man", shows Indigo some magic early in the story and gives her an old tattered fiddle as a gift, which becomes an extension of the young girl early in her life. He is also a Geechee Captain, and Indigo's relationship with him legitimizes her in the eyes of Crunch and Spats, the Jr. Geechee Captains she gets involved with.
- Idrina: Cypress' ex-lover; dancer. After Cypress returns to New York City to pursue dance, she integrates herself into feminist performance spaces where she meets the women of Azure Bosom, including Idrina, Ixchell and others. Idrina, whose longterm girlfriend Laura is out of town for a stint, befriends Cypress and they end up involved in an emotionally intense romantic relationship that leaves Cypress lost after Laura's return.

== List of themes ==
- The arts
- Blackness
- Community
- Family inheritance
- Foodways
- Gender/sexuality
- Gullah/Geechee culture
- Healing
- Mother-daughter relationships
- Nature
- Sisterhood
- Spirituality/religion
- Womanhood
- Women's work

== Reception ==
In The Boston Phoenix, Carolyn Clay wrote that "Shange has filled this fragmented, magical book with (as one of her own colored girls might put it) 'alla her stuff': poetry and pain, music and dancing, life in the fast lane that runs between California and New York, mystical powers passed down from the Geechees, letters from home, recipes permeated with the flavor of the South. And does she know how to strut her stuff. This is a showy novel, yet one without affectation."
