= If i can cook / you know god can =

Culinary memoir by Ntozake Shange

First edition

if i can cook / you know God can (sometimes known as If I Can Cook You Know God Can) is a culinary memoir by Ntozake Shange. It was originally published by Beacon Press, in Boston MA, United States, in 1998. The piece is both memoir and cookbook. Short essays precede recipes written in personal vernacular, and these recipes cover locations such as Cuba, Nicaragua, Brazil, the Dominican Republic, Haiti and the United States.

== Synopsis ==
=== Chapter 1 ===
The book begins with a discussion of celebrations and the food that accompanies them, mentioning Frederick Douglass's lack of enthusiasm for the celebration of the Fourth of July, and asking why "would they want to celebrate the American Declaration of Liberation while the Fugitive Slave Act, which allowed the kidnapping of free slaves back to slave states on the word of any white man, was in effect?" It details a winter during which Shange, determined to give her daughter a traditional Owens/Wilsons holiday, searches Clinton - Washington for ingredients. She looks for ways to recreate the traditional flavors, for she "tried to make again my very colored childhood and my very 'black' adolescence." In this first chapter, Shange expresses feeling a connection to her ancestors through the re-creation of pig's feet, chitlins' Hoppin’ John, baked ham, collard greens and cornbread with syrup despite experiencing the holiday in a friends home and eating alone.

=== Chapter 2 ===
Chapter 2 takes the reader to St. Louis and Shange uses the experience of listening to a short wave radio emanating the sounds of Fidel Castro as a child to talk about her experiences in Cuba as an adult. She says that her child was one of Cuba's Young Pioneers and shared food, recipes and traditions with children from a multitude of other locations, such as Zimbabwe and Palestine. While in Cuba, the author experiences a blackface performance, which she is horrified by. She eats avocado with beer and reminds herself that "history, our history, mustn't scare me." Cuba's slave trade history is discussed, and Shange is concerned with "How'd all these hardworking - cutting cane is torturous labor - Africans get fed and what'd they eat?"

=== Chapter 3 ===
In Chapter 3, Shange is in Nicaragua. She describes it as the "little country with the black people on one side of the mountain and the mestizoes and blancos on the other, while the Amerindians made a way for themselves in the jungles as best they could." She shows the East and West coast as being uncommunicative and disconnected and the area she is familiar with being left with no infrastructure, which she describes as detrimental to the community. Shange's journey to the house of the esteemed poet Rubén Darío leads her to participate in a bus ride during the entire bus singing along to Usted Abuso, by Shange's favorite salsa singer. This makes her feel at home. Shange runs into Carlos Johnson and partakes in the experience of a dance hall. saying "we connect to the culture of the people we live with",

=== Chapter 4 ===
Shange is in Brixton, a working-class West Indian neighborhood and she describes shopping in the area with her daughter, as they look for food items. Savannah and Shange prepare for her friend Leila's birthday dinner, and each of the ingredients used is described. At the end of the chapter, she mentions the fact that Leila's partner Darcus Howe is from Trinidad and Tobago, and makes a reference to the presence of slavery in East India. She ends with the quote: "Now we are independent. We own the soil. We have our own name. We have our own flag. Let us have some wine and some music."

=== Chapter 5 ===
In Chapter 5, Shange is in the world of the Caribbean, and looking at the "matter of the flyin' fish" in Trinidad and Tobago and Barbados. Here, she describes the different ways in which two communities looked at one commodity. The Trinidad and Tobago fishermen were catching the flyin fish that were essential to the Barbadian diet, and didn’t eat it. While the Barbadians argued that it was wrong for them to catch the fish that they didn’t even eat and then sell it back as a profit, they said that they were only supplying the demand. She then says that who knows what would happen if the Barbadians came after shark meat, which is treasured by the Trinidadians.

=== Chapter 6 ===
Chapter 6 is about Brazil. Shange talks about the different colors of the populations of different sections of Brazil, saying that the south is industrialized and "mythologically white", while it's thought that the "Africans" live in the north. She talks about how when she was at a university in Bahia she asked each student to bring in the beginning of a performance piece or something based either off their lives or the world as they knew it. Each student talked about a myth, which she found disturbing and says that "My students were validating themselves as the 'other' where they were not the other." Shange says that "We are not folklore." In terms of Brazil, she says that "the epitome and apex of Brazilian life may be the continually multiplying mulatta, but we must all eat whatever our hue, or the hue and cry over who we are." She then goes about looking at what makes up the primary dishes, focusing on Brazilian rice. Shange makes the point that Brazil has the highest percentage of people of African descent who live outside continent and that "We eat what they eat, just differently. These recipes have stayed with us for centuries, being improvised here and there, where we found somethin' we were accustomed to in, say, Guinea was not available at the mouth of the Amazon."

=== Chapter 7 ===
In Chapter 7, Shange talks about the Juba, "a dance of coutrin'", that is found in the Caribbean and the community of slaves in North America. Chapter 7 briefly discusses dance in slave culture and says that "it's time to tend to our own gardens. Let's grow some sweet potatoes to keep the niggah alive." It mentions the crops that were carried into the new world, and talks about Carolina rice, which Shange was raised on. It talks about different preparations of rice, and Shange relates style of cooking to location. She chides her mother for thinking that spice and a burnt bottom are ruining the rice, when rice with a crusty bottom is common in the Caribbean. Shange then goes back to dance, talking about classes taken at the Clark Center for the Performing Arts.

=== Chapter 8 ===
Chapter 8 talks about the assimilation of people to western territories and how old dishes are adapted to new locations, as well as the lack of knowledge newly arrived slaves had about the treatment of Native Americans. It talks about the ramifications of the Dred Scott decision. Oklahoma is mentioned as "our nearest place of safety", and A. G. Belton is mentioned as an entrepreneur who wrote to the American Colonization Society about the problems of post slavery communities. She questions the Buffalo Soldiers' treatment of the Native Americans and the way that "we changed, made necessary readjustments to our gods and belief systems to accommodate the Christianity thrust upon us as our salvation." (p. 54). She also discusses debate around bones of freemen that were found along Vine Street Expressway in Philadelphia. She says that bones have to be moved to make room for other things and that it was acceptable for the removed bones to be moved because they belonged to what were considered a "lower species of man". This leads to a part about the treatment of deceased African - Americans and what happens to their remains. Shange says that the world of slavery and the European took "what the world was to us out of our control?"

=== Chapter 9 ===
Chapter 9 looks at African Americans in Texas. She says that slaves in Texas weren't immediately informed that they were free until General Order number three was issued. African American Texans created their own independence day (Juneteenth) and she asserts that they found ways of finding community. She describes arenas commanded by African American cowboys who were continuing tradition, as well as her own participation. She says that rodeos were another venue for food, with women producing barbecue; she provides a recipe for Texan beef barbecue. She tells a story about convincing her father to come see her race barrels in Hitchcock, Texas, and about the barbecue they had. She details her father's reaction the barbecue and sauce, and his comparison of it to his own barbecue. Shange makes mention of the fact that "I was raised to experiment with taste and sound, thus my interest in music, language, and food, but more importantly to never turn my nose or chin up to any kinda food that anybody ate."

=== Chapter 10 ===
Chapter 10 begins with a mention of Elijah Muhammad's column "How to Eat to Live". Shange talks about Frank Yerby's play Foxes of Harrow and looks at his characters "defiant and self - determining" and at Yerby as someone who actively rejected Southern antebellum life, without denying its existence. From there, Shange looks at refusing food as "one of many methods Africans used to maintain some dignity, some control of their lives". She discusses the relationship between crackheads, dope fiends and slavery and writes that "Cooking is a way of insisting on living," and saying that "When we are hungry for life, we search out spice, aromas, and texture to entice and please those around us." She uses gumbo as an example here and references the cities of Charleston and New Orleans. She discusses different ways to make roux and then the way to add okra to gumbo, yet says that her own immediate family does not like okra.

=== Chapter 11 ===
Chapter 11 looks at boys. Shange says that from the first, she was expected to serve boys food, and that this was part of a dating ritual "to prove I was of value, valued my visitors and our time together so much that I made a hands-on effort to create something for whoever this person was". She discusses her adolescent reaction to it and her later realization that was being taught an important "Southern/African tradition of sharing the best I had with visitors". (p. 80). She describes the link between cooking and self value, as well as the energy and importance of time in the kitchen. She mentions that music can assist the kitchen process.

=== Chapter 12 ===
Chapter 12 looks at the need "to re-create a 'where' for our people". It looks at people who do not commit to the American way of life. Shange talks about meeting a Rastafarian in Cancun, Mexico, and the ways in which African culture was destabilized during slavery. She uses the limitation of diet as an example. Yvette, a friend, is used as an example; she explains that her vegetarianism is an alternative choice to the meat and dairy diet suggested by America. In this chapter, Shange looks at the idea that African Americans are a "people in transition" describes the first bembe she ever attended and talks about African-American Jews.

=== Epilogue ===
The epilogue contains references to Shange's dance experience and talks about sugar, giving people something to make them happy, and providing dessert recipes.

== Analysis ==
The author herself once described this difficult to define project as one of "writing some thoughts about food", It allows the author to see herself both within the tradition she is exploring as an individual, and is a tribute to black cuisine as a food that reflects the spirit and history of a people. Shange actually moved her bedroom into the kitchen while writing the book. She looks at food as something that celebrates the history, migration and soul of a people. Here, food provides the backdrop and basis for questions of identity that involve origin, relocation and what ultimately has the power to bring people together. The essays before each recipe endow them with historical, emotional, and communal importance. The small essays allow her to "understand or recognize herself in the history and culture of other African - origin people of the world... travels to Cuba, Nicaragua, Brazil, the Dominican Republic, Haiti, or places undeniably products of the African Diaspora launch Shange's thoughts on being and identity." Shange puts extreme value on food, evident in an interview with The Sun Magazine, in which she says that "I believe you should eat and prepare food with the same care you treat a newborn infant",

if i can cook / you know god can explores history, and the ways in which food and culture are intertwined. Different people, cultures and locations come together in the food put on the table, and the recipes that the food comes from. By writing about the food culture she comes from, Shange asserts the importance of the food she details and provides recipes for, the food that is important to her people. She claims this food culture, and history, as important, worthy of recognition, remembrance, and immortality in writing. Shange refuses to let this history be ignored. As stated by Mosaic Literary Magazine: "This is not a cookbook, it's a food lesson, a means by which the African diasporic existence is ultimately justified." Shange sees connection between food and history, and has said that "I also wanted to write about {blacks'} relationship to food as a people in bondage and how that changed." In this work, Shange actively addresses the past, and "goes well beyond mere listings of ingredients to show how various foods reflect the black experience from the slave ships to the present". For example, Shange introduces the readers to "Afro-Atlantic foodways", which is a type of food that came to being on slave ships.

This piece discusses the importance of location in relation to food. Eating brings people together. Shange displays the ways in which recipes are adapted according to location. When people move, they bring a food history with them, and yet it evolves according to the availability of ingredients, culture, traditions and influence of present location. Therefore, recipes are spread to different locations, evolving and yet simultaneously staying true to tradition. In a review in The Booklist by Alice Joyce, she says that Shange "paints a fervent, richly impassioned chronicle of African-American experience, at the same time making note of political situations and discord among the peoples of these nations and recording how connections are made beyond issues of class or skin color. Recipes serve as savory, nourishing garnishes" Shange displays the ways in which certain recipes and traditions have survived over time, allowing people to remember and recall Africa, even when in a different place. Food is a way for "black folks in the Western Hemisphere to be full". For example, Shange "identifies the African-American migration west after the Civil War and how the voyage was fueled by the hunting and farming skills folks learned during slavery. She makes these connections from a fundamental love for and admiration of the development of African contributions to the new world order". Shange claims that by continuing, but adapting, past food culture to location, African Americans declare the presence and importance of their culture in a new location, such as the United States. She is asking the questions "Where did black folks end up? How did they cope with relocation?" and realizing that the answer is "at the table, where hearts, minds, and bellies come together and are made full".

Shange looks at food as a feature of memory as well, for not only is the memory of history bestowed upon food but food, as a product of a long and rich culture, can trigger memory. When Shange spends New Years with her daughter in New York, she has an "insatiable desire to recreate for her daughter the family holidays she remembered".

This work is a tribute to the universality and individuality of food, for it connects an entire group of people and yet can remain a specific, unique experience. As said in The Austin Chronicle, "it's clear in her book that Shange takes a great deal of pleasure in the preparation, presentation, and savoring of well-prepared food". Shange writes her recipes with a specific reader in mind, one who will understand the references she makes and who has a prior knowledge of the foods she discusses. Shange reclaims the food history of her people, while dispelling stereotypes and misconceptions through an identification of facts, experiences, and feelings both cultural, historical, and social. Food ties people together, and Shange makes the point that "Our food isn't reflective of our lack of culture, it is, in fact, the very opposite - it's the foundation from which we grow and continue to thrive."

== Style and tone ==
The recipes and essays are written informally in a personable tone of an experienced person conveying exactly how to recreate a recipe. The recipes make allowances for individual preference and skill level, while at the same time making basic assumptions about the reader's knowledge base. Shange writes in "trademark lilting vernacular" The voice of a piece is extremely important, for Shange said in an interview with Neal A. Lester in 1990 that "I'm a firm believer that language and how we use language determines how we act, and how we act then determines our lives and other people's lives."
