= Ntozake Shange =

American playwright and poet (1948–2018)

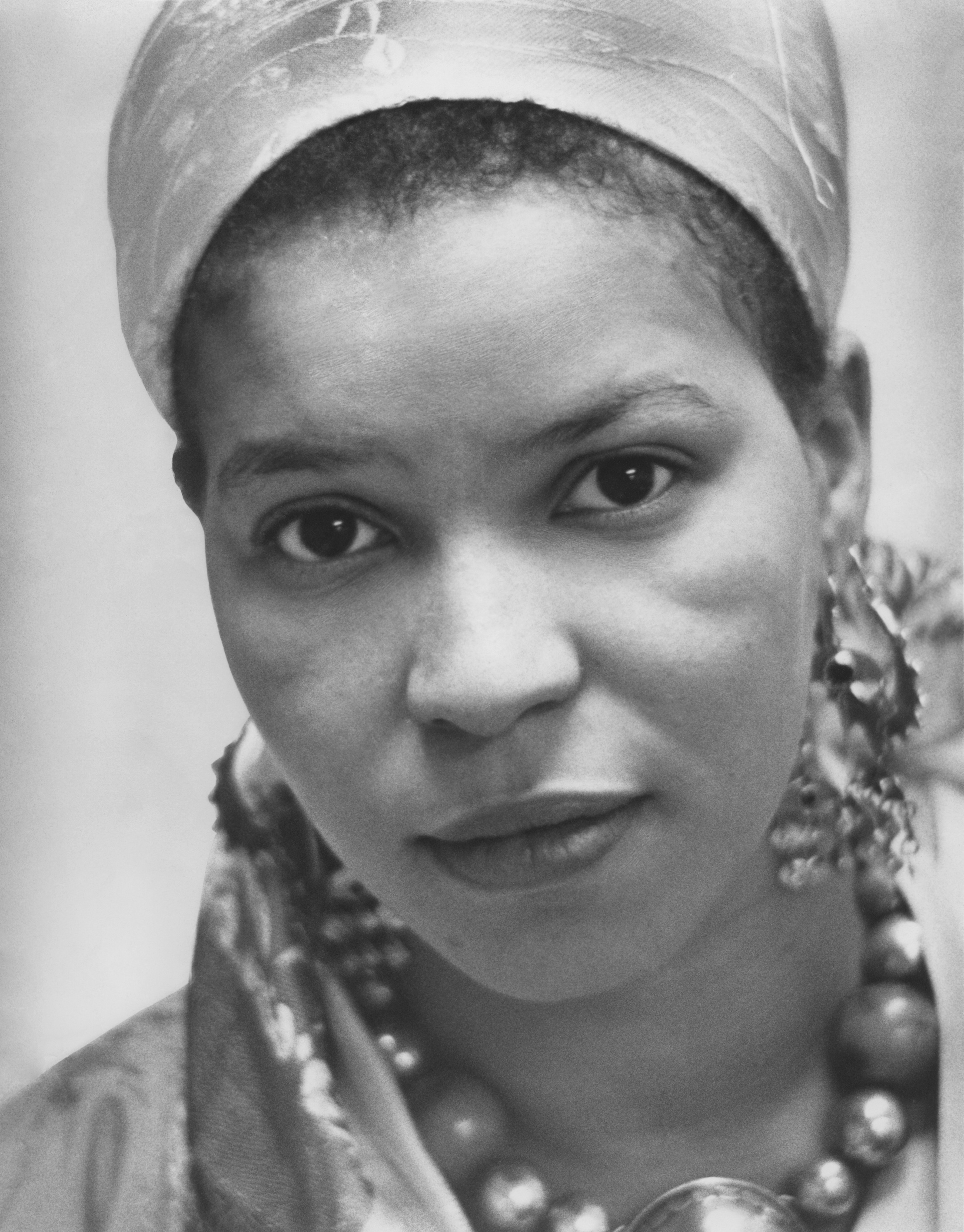
- Shange in 1978
- Born: Paulette Linda Williams; October 18, 1948; Trenton, New Jersey, U.S.
- Died: October 27, 2018 (aged 70); Bowie, Maryland, U.S.
- Education: Barnard College (BA); University of Southern California (MA)
- Occupations: Playwright; author; poet
- Known for: for colored girls who have considered suicide / when the rainbow is enuf (1975)
- Relatives: Ifa Bayeza (sister); Bisa Williams (sister)
- Website: officialntozakeshange.com

Ntozake Shange (/ˌɛntoʊˈzɑːki ˈʃɑːŋɡeɪ/ EN-toh-ZAH-kee SHAHNG-Ê; October 18, 1948 – October 27, 2018) was an American playwright and poet. As a Black feminist, she addressed issues relating to race and Black power in much of her work. She is best known for her Obie Award-winning play, for colored girls who have considered suicide / when the rainbow is enuf (1975). She also penned novels including Sassafrass, Cypress & Indigo (1982), Liliane (1994), and Betsey Brown (1985), about an African-American girl who runs away from home.

Among Shange's honors and awards were fellowships from the Guggenheim Foundation and Lila Wallace Reader's Digest Fund, a Shelley Memorial Award from the Poetry Society of America, and a Pushcart Prize. In April 2016, Barnard College announced that it had acquired Shange's archive.

== Early life ==
Shange was born Paulette Linda Williams in Trenton, New Jersey, to an upper-middle-class African-American family. Her father, Paul T. Williams, was a surgeon, and her mother, Eloise Williams, was an educator and a psychiatric social worker. When she was aged eight, Shange's family moved to the racially segregated city of St. Louis. As a result of the Brown v. Board of Education court decision, Shange was bused to a white school where she endured racism and racist attacks.

Shange's family had a strong interest in the arts and encouraged her artistic education. Among the guests at their home were Dizzy Gillespie, Miles Davis, Chuck Berry, Paul Robeson, and W. E. B. Du Bois. From an early age, Shange took an interest in poetry. While growing up with her family in Trenton, Shange attended poetry readings with her younger sister Wanda (now known as the playwright Ifa Bayeza). These poetry readings fostered an early interest for Shange in the South in particular, and the loss it represented to young Black children who migrated to the North with their parents. In 1956, Shange's family moved to St. Louis, Missouri, where Shange was sent several miles away from home to a non-segregated school that allowed her to receive "gifted" education. While attending this non-segregated school, Shange faced overt racism and harassment. These experiences would later go on to heavily influence her work.

When Shange was 13, she returned to Lawrence Township, Mercer County, New Jersey, where she graduated in 1966 from Trenton Central High School. In 1966, Shange enrolled at Barnard College (class of 1970) in New York City. During her time at Barnard, Shange met fellow Barnard student and would-be poet Thulani Davis. The two poets would later go on to collaborate on various works. Shange graduated cum laude in American Studies, then earned a master's degree in the same field from the University of Southern California in Los Angeles. However, her college years were not all pleasant. She married during her first year in college, but the marriage did not last long. Depressed over her separation and with a strong sense of bitterness and alienation, she attempted suicide.

In 1970 in San Francisco, having come to terms with her depression and alienation, Shange rejected "Williams" as a slave name and "Paulette" (after her father Paul) as patriarchal, and asked South African musicians Ndikho and Nomusa Xaba to bestow an African name. In 1971, Ndikho duly chose Ntozake and Shange, which Shange respectively glossed as Xhosa "She who comes with her own things" and Zulu "She who walks like a lion".

== Career ==
In 1975, Shange moved back to New York City, after earning her master's degree in American Studies in 1973 from the University of Southern California in Los Angeles, California. She is acknowledged as having been a founding poet of the Nuyorican Poets Café. In that year her first and most well-known play was produced — for colored girls who have considered suicide / when the rainbow is enuf. First produced Off-Broadway, the play soon moved on to Broadway at the Booth Theatre and won several awards, including the Obie Award, Outer Critics Circle Award, and the AUDELCO Award. This play, her most famous work, was a 20-part choreopoem — a term Shange coined to describe her groundbreaking dramatic form, combining of poetry, dance, music, and song — that chronicled the lives of women of color in the United States. The poem was eventually made into the stage play, was then published in book form in 1977. In 2010, the choreopoem was adapted into a film (For Colored Girls, directed by Tyler Perry).

In 1978, Shange became an associate of the Women's Institute for Freedom of the Press (WIFP). WIFP is an American nonprofit publishing organization. The organization works to increase communication between women and connect the public with forms of women-based media.

Shange subsequently wrote other successful plays, including Spell No. 7, a 1979 choreopoem that explores the Black experience, and starred dancer and choreographer Dyane Harvey-Salaam, which whom she also collaborated on other works.

Shange's adaptation of Bertolt Brecht's Mother Courage and Her Children (1980) won an Obie Award.

In the 1980s, Shange moved to Texas to be closer to family and took a job teaching at Rice University. She then taught in the Creative Writing Program at the University of Houston from 1984 to 1986. While there, she wrote the ekphrastic poetry collection Ridin' the Moon in Texas: Word Paintings and served as thesis advisor for poet and playwright Annie Finch. Over the course of her career, she also taught or lectured at Prairie View A&M University (1997-2001), Brown University, Villanova University, DePaul University, Yale University, and Howard University, among other academic institutions.

Shange edited The Beacon Best of 1999: creative writing by women and men of all colors (Beacon Press, ISBN 978-0-8070-6221-0), which featured the work of Dorothy Allison, Junot Díaz, Rita Dove, Louise Erdrich, Martín Espada, Ruth Prawer Jhabvala, Ha Jin, Jamaica Kincaid, Barbara Kingsolver, Yusef Komunyakaa, Hanif Kureishi, Marjorie Sandor, John Edgar Wideman, and others.

In 2003, Shange wrote and oversaw the production of Lavender Lizards and Lilac Landmines: Layla's Dream while serving as a visiting artist at the University of Florida, Gainesville.

Shange's individual poems, essays, and short stories have appeared in numerous magazines and anthologies, including The Black Scholar, Yardbird, Ms., Essence Magazine, The Chicago Tribune, VIBE, and Third-World Women, and Daughters of Africa (edited by Margaret Busby, 1992.

=== Relationship to the Black Arts Movement ===
Although Shange is described as a "post-Black artist", her work was decidedly feminist, whereas the Black Arts Movement has been criticized as misogynistic and "sexism had been widely and hotly debated within movement publications and organizations." Amiri Baraka—one of the leading male figures of the movement—denied her as a post-Black artist. With regard to Shange as a part of the black aesthetic and as a post-Black artist, he claimed "that several women writers, among them Michelle Wallace [sic] and Ntozake Shange, like [Ishmael] Reed, had their own 'Hollywood' aesthetic, one of 'capitulation' and 'garbage.'"

=== Honors ===
Among Shange's honors and awards were fellowships from the Guggenheim Foundation and Lila Wallace Reader's Digest Fund, a Shelley Memorial Award from the Poetry Society of America, and a Pushcart Prize. In April 2016, Barnard College announced that it had acquired Shange's archive.

== Personal life and death ==
Shange lived in Brooklyn, New York. Shange had one daughter, Savannah Shange. Shange was married twice: to the jazz saxophonist David Murray and the painter McArthur Binion, Savannah's father, with both marriages ending in divorce.

Shange died in her sleep on October 27, 2018, aged 70, in an assisted-living facility in Bowie, Maryland. She had been ill, having suffered a series of strokes in 2004, but she "had been on the mend lately, creating new work, giving readings and being feted for her work." Her sister Ifa Bayeza (with whom she co-wrote the 2010 novel Some Sing, Some Cry) said: "It's a huge loss for the world. I don't think there's a day on the planet when there's not a young woman who discovers herself through the words of my sister."

== Awards ==
- NDEA fellow, 1974
- Obie Award
- Outer Critics Circle Award
- Audience Development Committee (Audelco) Award
- Mademoiselle Award
- Frank Silvera Writers' Workshop Award, 1978
- Los Angeles Times Book Prize for Poetry, 1981 (for Three Pieces)
- Guggenheim fellowship, 1981
- Medal of Excellence, Columbia University, 1981
- Obie Award, 1981, for Mother Courage and Her Children
- Nori Eboraci Award
- Barnard College, 1988
- Lila Wallace-Reader's Digest Fund annual writer's award, 1992
- Paul Robeson Achievement Award, 1992
- Arts and Cultural Achievement Award
- National Coalition of 100 Black Women (Pennsylvania chapter), 1992
- Taos World Poetry Heavyweight Champion, 1992, 1993, 1994
- Living Legend Award, National Black Theatre Festival, 1993
- Claim Your Life Award
- WDAS-AM/FM, 1993
- Monarch Merit Award
- National Council for Culture and Arts
- Supersisters trading card set (one of the cards featured Shange's name and picture), 1979
- Pushcart Prize
- St. Louis Walk of Fame inductee
- Proclamation of "Ntozake Shange Day" (Borough of Manhattan, New York) by Congressman Charles Rangel on June 14, 2014.
- Langston Hughes Medal, 2016, City College of New York
- Shelley Memorial Award

=== Nominations ===
- Emmy Award, 1977, nominee, Outstanding Writing in a Comedy-Variety or Music Special, An Evening with Diana Ross The Big Event
- Tony Award, 1977, nominee, Tony Award for Best Play, For Colored Girls Who Have Considered Suicide / When the Rainbow Is Enuf
- Grammy Award, 1978, nominee, Grammy Award for Best Spoken Word Album, For Colored Girls Who Have Considered Suicide / When the Rainbow Is Enuf

== Works ==
=== Plays ===
- for colored girls who have considered suicide/ when the rainbow is enuf (1975). Nominated for a Tony Award, Grammy Award, and Emmy Award; first published 1976; updated 2010 with a new section, "Positive" (Scribner).
- A Photograph: Lovers in Motion (1977). Produced Off-Broadway by Joseph Papp's New York Shakespeare Festival at The Public Theater. (Note: First produced under the title A Photograph: A Still Life With Shadows/ A Photograph: A Study in Cruelty in 1977. Produced under the current title A Photograph: Lovers in Motion by the Equinox Theatre in Houston, Texas, in 1979.)
- Boogie Woogie Landscapes (1979). Produced on Broadway at the Symphony Space Theatre. (Note: First presented as a one-woman piece at the New York Shakespeare Festival's Poetry at the Public series on December 18, 1978. Presented in play form at the Symphony Space Theatre as a fundraiser for The Frank Silvera Writer's Workshop on June 26, 1979.)
- Spell #7 (written spell #7) or spell #7: Geechee jibaro Quik magic trance manual for technologically stressed third world people (1979). Produced Off-Broadway by Joseph Papp's New York Shakespeare Festival at The Public Theater.
- Mother Courage and Her Children (1980). Produced off-Broadway at The Public Theater. Winner of a 1981 Obie Award.
- Three for a Full Moon (1982).
- Bocas (1982). First produced at the Mark Taper Forum in Los Angeles.
- From Okra to Greens/A Different Kinda Love Story (1983).
- Three views of Mt. Fuji (1987). First produced in San Francisco at The Lorraine Hansberry Theatre; first New York production at the New Dramatists.
- Daddy Says (1989).
- Hydraulics Phat Like Mean (1998). (Note: Published in Love's Fire: Seven New Plays Inspired by Seven Shakespearean Sonnets (1998). Inspired by Shakespeare's Sonnet 128.)

=== Poetry Collections ===
- Melissa & Smith (1976)
- Natural Disasters and Other Festive Occasions (1977)
- Where the Mississippi Meets the Amazon (1977)
- Nappy Edges (1978)
- Black and White Two Dimensional Planes (1979)
- A Daughter's Geography (1983)
- From Okra to Greens (1984)
- Ridin' the Moon in Texas: Word Paintings (St. Martin's Press, 1987)
- The Love Space Demands (a continuing saga) (St. Martin's Press, 1987)
- A Photograph: Lovers in Motion: A Drama (S. French, 1977)
- Some Men (1981)
- Three Pieces (St. Martin's Press, 1992)
- I Live in Music (1994)
- The Sweet Breath of Life: A Poetic Narrative of the African-American Family (Atria Books, 2004). Photography by Kamoinge Inc.
- "Enuf"
- "With No Immediate Cause"
- "you are sucha fool"
- "People of Watts" (first published November 1993 in VIBE Magazine)
- "Blood Rhythms"
- "Poet Hero"
- Wild Beauty: New and Selected Poems (Atria Books, 2017)
- Freedom's a-Callin Me (Harper Collins, 2012 ISBN 9780061337437)

=== Novels ===
- Sassafrass (Shameless Hussy Press, 1976)
- For Colored Girls Who Have Considered Suicide/When the Rainbow is Enuf (Shameless Hussy Press, 1976)
- Sassafrass, Cypress & Indigo (1982)
- Betsey Brown (St. Martin's Press, 1985)
- Liliane (1994)
- Some Sing, Some Cry (2010) (with Ifa Bayeza)

=== Film ===
- Whitewash (1994)

=== Children's books ===
- Coretta Scott (2009)
- Ellington Was Not a Street (2003)
- Float Like a Butterfly: Muhammad Ali, the Man Who Could Float Like a Butterfly and Sting Like a Bee (2002)
- Daddy Says (2003)
- Whitewash (1997)

=== Essays and non-fiction ===
- See No Evil: Prefaces, Essays & Accounts, 1976–1983 (1984)
- Foreword in The Black Book by Robert Mapplethorpe (1986)
- if i can cook / you know god can (1998)
- Dance We Do: A Poet Explores Black Dance (2020)
- Sing a Black Girl’s Song (2023)
