= Liliane (novel) =

1994 novel by Ntozake Shange

Liliane: Resurrection of The Daughter
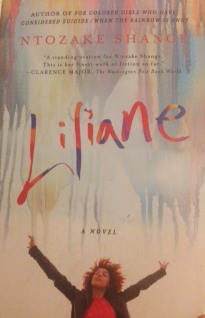
- Front cover
- Author: Ntozake Shange
- Cover artist: Lisa Marie Pompilio
- Language: English
- Genre: Novel
- Published: 1994
- Publisher: St. Martin's Press
- Publication place: United States
- Media type: Print (hardback & paperback)
- Pages: 288 pages
- ISBN: 0312644108
- Preceded by: Betsey Brown
- Followed by: Some Sing, Some Cry

Liliane: Resurrection of The Daughter is a novel by Ntozake Shange. It was originally published by St. Martin's Press in 1994. The novel tells the coming-of-age story of a young Black woman, Liliane Parnell, through the numerous voices of childhood friends, family, lovers, acquaintances, conversations between Liliane and her psychoanalyst, and Liliane herself. Liliane is the daughter of a wealthy and prominent African-American judge, Lincoln Parnell, and his beautiful wife Sunday Bliss Parnell who is working towards reconciling her life as an artist in the present with both the secrets and the expectations of class ascendance from her family's past.

== Plot summary ==
The novel opens with a conversation between Liliane and her psychoanalyst. These conversations become regular interval points within and throughout the novel as the story unfolds. Liliane expresses concern about her current situation, professing that she cannot breathe and that she is looking for somebody and it does not matter who, she says, "as long as he won't hurt me".

As the novel continues, Liliane's character is developed through the lens of those around her with whom she is close. The reader learns that Liliane grew up within a wealthy and prominent Black family that was part of the Talented tenth. Liliane's father pushes her to pursue a husband who will "'...have the backbone to fight for what's never happened, or for dreams.'" These comments lead Liliane to eventually leave her first boyfriend, Danny, and pursue another man, named Granville, who better conforms to her father's ideal of a suitable match.

As Liliane and her close friends grow older, however, they begin to face significant conflicts within their lives. One of Liliane's close friends, Hyacinthe, begins to have mental health troubles early in her adolescence and depends heavily on her brother, Sawyer Malveaux III for support. When he is unexpectedly shot, however, Hyacinthe's mental condition becomes worse and she eventually enters care in a mental health facility. For Liliane, a major hurdle is the disappearance of her mother from her life and the breakdown of her nuclear family. As Liliane transitions to adulthood, the pressures from her father to be the ideal Black woman and mate to a powerful Black leader begin to have less of an impact on her life decisions. While the relationships with the women that Liliane formed throughout her early childhood and adolescence remain deeply important to her (and are maintained throughout the novel), Liliane begins to make romantic, sexual, and platonic connections with men and women from all walks of life. The desires of her father, and the mysterious disappearance of her mother, however, are never far from her mind.

== Characters ==
- Liliane The novel's eponymous protagonist. Liliane is a young artist who is coming to terms both with the social issues of her time surrounding racial uplift and her own family's past and secrets.
- Jean-René One of Liliane's various lovers. He is introduced to the reader in the first chapter to the reader as a man Liliane met at a fast food place next to the Moulin Rouge.
- Roxie One of Liliane's close childhood friends. She remains friends with Liliane throughout Liliane's transition to adulthood.
- Sierra Roxie's daughter.
- Sunday "S." Bliss Liliane's mother. She is described as beautiful and articulate.
- Parnell Liliane's father. He is a judge and a wealthy, prominent, and well respected figure in the African-American community.
- Victor-Jésus Maria Another one of Liliane's lovers, Victor-Jésus Maria is a Puerto Rican photographer living on the Lower East Side of Manhattan. He is boastful and playful.
- Danny Liliane's first boyfriend. Danny hails from a different class background from Liliane and is looked down upon by Liliane's father Parnell Lincoln because he is not seen as a promising enough match for Liliane.
- Sawyer Malveaux III Eldest son in a prominent Creole family residing in St. Louis, Missouri. Malveaux is the charismatic, handsome, and unruly brother of Hyacinthe. He fails to live up to the expectations of his well to do family and is seen as a failure and "good-for-nothing" after having been kicked out of multiple colleges and universities.
- Hyacinthe One of Liliane's childhood friends and the sister of Sawyer Malveaux. She struggles with her mental health.
- Rose Lynne Liliane's good friend from childhood.
- Lollie Liliane's cousin.
- Granville Liliane's boyfriend after Danny. He fits the description of a what Liliane's father would deem a suitable match for Liliane.
- Bernadette One of Liliane's most ambivalent acquaintances. Bernadette is close to Danny and also hails from a different class than that of Rose Lynne and Liliane's.

== Structure ==
The novel's form is seemingly unique as it is divided into chapters narrated by important persons in Liliane's life and conversations between Liliane and her psychoanalyst that occur in between each chapter. These chapters feature anecdotes about the narrating character's interactions with Liliane, usually providing illumination of the conversations Liliane has with her psychoanalyst that are featured prior to the chapter. Because of the multiplicity of narrators throughout the novel, the reader is often forced to make a decision about which narrator to believe. This unique episodic structure allows for the novel to cover a wide range in time periods.

== Major themes ==
=== Racial uplift ===
A central theme in the novel concerns the project of Racial Uplift within the African-American and Black community. Liliane's social standing within an upper middle class prominent Black family seemingly conforms to the model of racial uplift promoted by figures such as W. E. B. Du Bois, who advocated for the instruction of Liberal Arts education to Black people in the United States in order to create a leadership elite often referred to as the Talented Tenth. Liliane's father, a prominent Black judge, is highly invested in maintaining the image of his family as a part of that leadership elite. However, Liliane's contact and social relations with Black individuals who are outside of her own class seemingly problematizes this philosophical project to a certain extent.

=== Mother–daughter relationships ===
The broken relationship between Liliane and her mother, Sunday "S." Bliss operates in the novel as a point of deep internal conflict in Liliane's life. Early on in Liliane's life, Sunday Bliss serves as a role model to Liliane, however, after Sunday "S." Bliss has an affair and marries a white man, Liliane's father, ashamed of his wife's choice to pursue her own happiness over the project of racial uplift, lies to Liliane telling her that her mother is dead. Unable to reconcile her adoration of her mother with her mother's sudden and unexplained absence in her life, Liliane develops a sense of self that is fragmented and, at times, deeply conflicted. Once Liliane recognizes that her mother is, in fact, not dead, she is unable to make sense of the fact that her mother would abandon her to pursue a romantic relationship with a white man.

=== Female sexuality ===
The exploration of Female Sexuality is featured heavily in the novel. Despite her father's attempts to instill Liliane with a sense of obligation to the project of Racial Uplift, and his encouragement of Liliane to become the wife of someone who has the potential to be a powerful leader in the Black community, Liliane's romantic and sexual relationships are varied, diverse, and bridge interpersonal gaps of both class and race throughout the novel. The novel portrays Liliane as a decisive agent in the context of her sexual relationships.

=== Psychoanalysis ===
Liliane is very much emotionally conflicted as a result of her family's past secrets, her desires for herself, and her father's desires for her. Like her mother, Liliane struggles with choosing between honoring herself and the project of Racial Uplift that her father is heavily invested in. Additionally, Liliane is heavily affected by the existential pain of anti-black racism. As a result, Liliane's conversations with her psychoanalyst are often turbulent and disjointed as she struggles to build her sense of self in her transition to adulthood and her growth as a painter.

== Reception and literary criticism ==
Initial reviews of Liliane: Resurrection of the Daughter were mostly positive. In her New York Times book review, Valerie Sayers characterized the novel as a work that is "moving and evocative" as well as "dense, ambitious" and "a worthy song". Other reviewers have described the novel as somewhat frustrating. In a Booklist review, Donna Seaman writes of Liliane: "You admire it, learn from it, desire it, and resist it all at the same time." While little critical scholarship of Liliane exists, Ntozake Shange has spoken about the novel in interviews that have been featured in literary journals, including an interview published in Black American Literature Forum, in which Shange remarks of Liliane's character as a woman who, "goes all over the world, and all over the world she is confronted with sexism".
