= Lorraine Hansberry Theatre =

African American art institution in San Francisco, California

Coordinates: 37.778307°N 122.429268°W

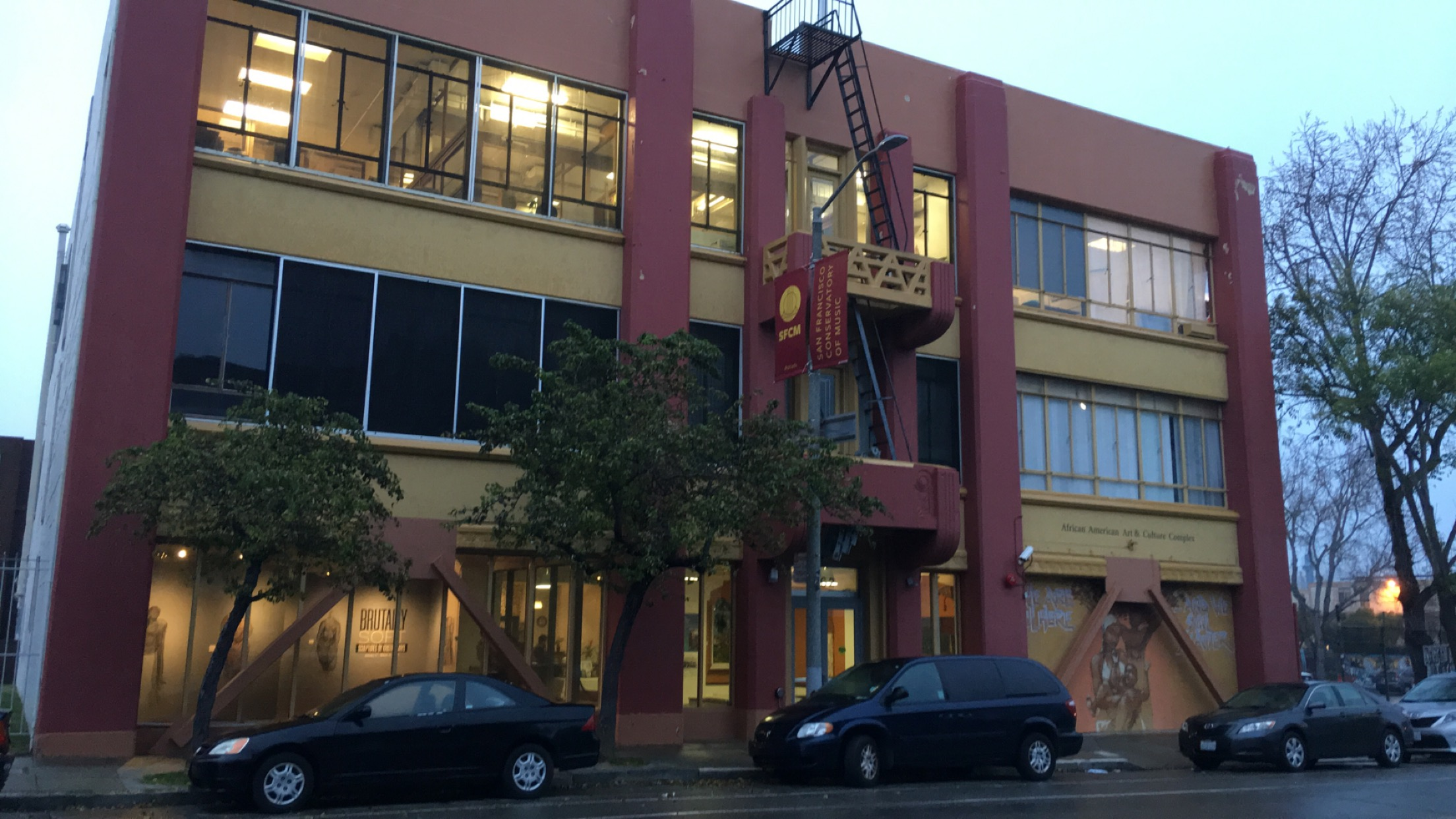
The Lorraine Hansberry Theater at its current location at 762 Fulton St

The Lorraine Hansberry Theatre is an African-American arts institution located in downtown San Francisco. It is named after Lorraine Hansberry, who wrote A Raisin in the Sun while living in Bay Area. Since being founded in 1981, The Lorraine Hansberry Theatre has mounted productions that have included performances by Ruby Dee, Ossie Davis, Danny Glover and Ntozake Shange.

The theatre has mounted more than 100 plays, productions, and theatrical events since its founding, with the theme of exploring the African-American experience. The organization has survived obstacles including declining African-American population in San Francisco, and multiple location changes.

Notable productions include the 1987 production of Ntozake Shange's play Three Views of Mt. Fuji, which completed a six-week run at the Lorraine Hansberry Theatre preceding an opening in New York at New Dramatists. In 1991 African-American playwright Robert Alexander challenged the work of Harriet Beecher Stowe with a production at The Lorraine Hansberry Theatre examining stereotypes in the cabin of Uncle Tom.

== Change of venue ==
In June 2007, the theatre's lease for the YWCA building on 620 Sutter Street was scheduled to expire at the end of the following month (July 2007) and instead of a renewal, the space was going to be purchased by the Academy of Art University. This arts organization was planning to continue to use the building as a dormitory, as it had done since 2005.

A campaign was quickly organized in an attempt to avoid displacement of the theatre. "The heads of the San Francisco Opera, San Francisco Ballet, San Francisco Symphony, SFMOMA, and other major institutions sent a joint letter urging the mayor to take action."

On June 30, the San Francisco’s Board of Supervisors passed a resolution "supporting the Lorraine Hansberry and its contributions to the cultural life of San Francisco" with a unanimous vote of all 10 members present.

The theatre company moved into a venue at 450 Post Street. Executive Director Quentin Easter stated that the company expected to stay at this theatre “for the foreseeable future."

The theatre unexpectedly "...canceled the rest of its season and [withdrew] from its recently announced lease of the former Post Street Theatre. The moves were necessitated by the hospitalization of its founders, Artistic Director Stanley E. Williams and Executive Director Quentin Easter", according to an announcement posted on the company's website.

The theatre announced its move into the 729-seat Post Street space in January 2010. It opened there in February with the gospel musical Mahalia.

As of 2026, the theater is located in the San Francisco African American Historical and Cultural Society at 762 Fulton St.

== Loss of co-founder ==
"(Quentin) Easter co-founded Lorraine Hansberry Theatre with Stanley E. Williams in 1981, and served as its Executive Director since that time. He supervised the renovation and relocation of the theater to its former home at 620 Sutter Street — a one-half-million-dollar project which established Lorraine Hansberry Theatre as the first African-American Arts institution to be located in the high-profile theatre district of downtown San Francisco. Easter served as a panelist for the California Arts Council's Theatre Program, Multicultural Entry Level Program, and Multicultural Advancement Program. He was saluted by KGO-TV 7 in 1990 with its 'Profiles in Excellence' Award; by KQED-TV in 2007 with its 'Local Heroes Award' for community involvement, leadership, and accomplishments. Other awards include the National Council of Negro Women Special Service Award 2006; San Francisco Black Pride Reggie Williams Achievement Award 2006; and the Thurgood Marshall College Fund Award of Excellence 2008. Under his direction, Lorraine Hansberry Theatre was honored with the Bay Area Critics' Circle's Paine Knickerbocker Award, for continued contributions to Bay Area theatre."

The remainder of the season featured Stick Fly by Lydia R. Diamond (The Bluest Eye) and leading local actor Margo Hall in Fabulation by Pulitzer Prize winner Lynn Nottage (Ruined, Intimate Apparel). The first signs of trouble came with the postponement of Stick Fly from March until a later date.

=== New artistic director ===
In September of 2020 the theatre hired Margo Hall as its first female artistic director. Hall was active in Bay Area theatre for over 30 years, with connections to the Lorraine Hansberry Theatre throughout her career.
