= Bessey (surname) =

Bessey is a surname. Notable people with the surname include:

- Charles A. Bessey (1848–1909), American soldier and Medal of Honor recipient
- Charles Edwin Bessey (1845–1915), American botanist
- Chris Bessey (born 1971), British boxer
- Ernst Bessey (1877–1957), American botanist, son of Charles Edwin Bessey
- Joanna Bessey (born 1976), Asian film and television actress
- Joe Bessey (born 1961), NASCAR owner and driver
- Sarah Bessey (born 1979), Canadian author
