= Bese =

The name Bese can refer to the following:

- Bese family, an ancient Swedish noble family
- Bese (Bhatkal district) village in Bhatkal district, Karnataka State, India
- Hungarian name of Stejărenii, a constituent village of Daneș commune in Romania
- Barnabás Bese (born 1994), Hungarian football player
- Gunilla Bese (1475–1553), Finnish noble, fiefholder of Vyborg Castle 1511-1513
- Valeria Bese or Valeria Motogna-Beșe (born 1979), Romanian handball player

== See also ==
- Besse (disambiguation)
- Bessie (disambiguation)
- Betsey (disambiguation)
