= Nappy edges =

1978 book by Ntozake Shange

nappy edges
- First edition
- Author: Ntozake Shange
- Cover artist: Henry Sene Yee
- Language: English
- Genre: Poetry
- Published: 1978 (St. Martin's Press)
- Publication place: United States
- Media type: Print (hardback & paperback)
- Pages: 150 pages
- ISBN: 0-312-06424-1

nappy edges is a collection of poetry and prose poetry written by Ntozake Shange and first published by St. Martin's Press in 1978. The poems, which vary in voice and style, explore themes of love, racism, sexism, and loneliness. It is Shange's third book of poetry, and was met with positive reviews and praise from critics, like Holly Prado of the Los Angeles Times, who said, "this collection of poems, prose poems and poetic essays merges personal passion and heightened language."

== Structure ==
The collection is divided into five sections of poetry and prose. The first section, "things i wd say", contains an opening essay on the nature of poetry called "takin a solo/ a poetic possibility/ a poetic imperative", and is followed by four more sections: "love & other highways", "closets", "& she bleeds", and "whispers with the unicorn". Although each section of the volume is distinct, the poems are all in conversation with each other and cover similar themes.

== Themes ==
The subtitle of the collection is "the roots of your hair/what turns back when we sweat, run, make love, dance, get afraid, get happy: the tell-tale sign of living." The salient themes of the various writings in nappy edges can be tied back to the multifaceted existence and complicated identities of black women. Like her plays, novels, and choreopoems, Shange's poems are as humorous as they are tragic, and explore a variety of themes.

=== Poetry ===
Many of Shange's poems are about poetry itself—what it means to write it, and what it means to read it. In "takin a solo/ a poetic possibility/ a poetic imperative", she implores black writers to cultivate the kinds of distinctive and original voices that we appreciate and expect from black musicians. Her fear is that black voices will fade into indistinction, and eventually their voices won't be recognizable at all.

In "inquiry", Shange explains that poems elicit a visceral reaction out of the reader in the same way that a kiss or cold water would. Following this expectation, Shange focusses some of her poems on the responsibility of the poet to the reader. Generally speaking, the poet is expected to speak on behalf of communities, and to transport the reader to places they've never even been, but Shange emphasizes the necessity of the poet showing you what they know personally. By placing importance on the personal rather than the universal, Shange is able to explore the interiority of her personas' minds.

Shange also looks at what it means to be a black woman poet when the world of poetry is dominated by white men. Particularly during this historical moment in the late 1970s, not long after the Black Arts Movement which was a very male-dominated and patriarchal movement, Shange's position as a black woman poet is groundbreaking. She challenges the idea that words and poetry belong to men, and points to how unfair it is that when a woman does something, an "ess" is added to the title (as in "poetess").

=== Love ===
Stories of love and relationships can be found in each section of nappy edges. Shange explores how traditional gender dynamics can mistreat women. From manipulative men who take advantage of women sexually, to women who stand up for themselves, each poem tells a different story. Shange explores love and relationships as spaces where women should be able to seek their own pleasure, sexual or otherwise. By showing how sex and love can either torment or uplift women, Shange is able to

=== Loneliness and self-care ===
Although the women in Shange's poems are self-sufficient, there is still an overarching theme of loneliness throughout nappy edges. Rather than dwelling on this loneliness, Shange focusses on the theme of self-care as a woman and as a poet. It is clear from these poems that being a woman and being a poet in a patriarchal society is not easy, but Shange relies on herself and her creativity for survival. This self-care takes different forms, from talking to herself to writing poetry, but she insists that black women in particular take care of themselves, and claims that this is both a personal and political struggle.

=== Black womanhood ===
Shange uses her poems to push back against the way in which black women have been allowed a single, monolithic voice and experience. She claims that there is such a profound ignorance about the lives of black women, that they themselves struggle to fully understand themselves, thus creating identity confusion. In the same way that she calls for linguistic specificity from black poets, she fights to carve out a space for subjectivity from black women—a space where they can at least try to articulate themselves more clearly and authentically. Shange returns to the idea of self-care consistently throughout her work, and often stresses its importance for black women in particular. In nappy edges, self-care is a remedy for personal struggles, but it is also a necessary reality of being the kind of black woman that she writes about struggling with abusive men, sexism, racism, and the ways that they all overlap.

== Style ==
Shange's style remains just as integral a part of her poetry as the content. In keeping with her focus on the importance of cultivating a personal writerly voice, she uses language, spelling, grammar, and tone to emphasize her themes. As she does in most of her poetry, Shange uses slashes to demarcate clauses, rather than line breaks. She also chooses not to use standard punctuation like apostrophes, and removes the letters from certain words, such as "wd" instead of "would". This is all a part of her project to express herself the way that she chooses to, not the way that she is expected to by both the confines of standard English and also by those who associate poetry with a specific, formal way of expressing oneself.

Shange is also incredibly influenced by music, particularly jazz and blues artists. Her poems are lyrical and sometimes reminiscent of the style of improvisation in jazz. "i live in music", for instance, is explicitly about Shange's love of music, and does not stick to a particular rhythm or meter (like most of her poems). Shange recorded a version of "i live in music" accompanied by the William Goffigan Ensemble, which demonstrates both the connection between her poems and music, and her poetry's innate musicality.

== Critical reception ==
Although nappy edges is not as widely read as for colored girls who have considered suicide/when the rainbow is enuf or some of Shange's other works, it was well received. Roxanne Brown of the New Pittsburgh Courier called the book "a richly-textiled tapestry of cheeriness and pain, woven together by a musical lyric of women's tears and girlish laughter." The Los Angeles Times' review also said that "Poetry, at its most intense, promises revelation. We don't read poets for information, but for some gasp of insight. There's plenty of revelation in 'Nappy Edges'." Kirkus Reviews called the collection "an energetic, provocative book of poetry. Using the work as a vehicle for confronting life, Shange provides a sense of immediate contact with a volatile and expressive set of emotions. (...) Shange's concerns remain inseparably political and personal, her music distinctive, her method of expression emotional and tempered with enough objectivity to avoid rhetoric. A fine show."

== See also ==
- for colored girls who have considered suicide when the rainbow is enuf
- Black Arts Movement
