= BES =

BES or Bes may refer to:

- Bes, Egyptian deity
- Bes (coin), Roman coin denomination
- Bes (Marvel Comics), fictional character loosely based on the Egyptian deity
- Bes (Artist) Musical artist

== Abbreviations ==
- Bachelor of Environmental Studies, a degree
- Banco Espírito Santo, a Portuguese banking group
- Beryllium sulfide, formula BeS
- The BES Islands (Bonaire, Sint Eustatius, Saba) forming the Caribbean Netherlands
- BES III, Beijing Spectrometer III, particle physics experiment
- BlackBerry Enterprise Server, software
- Brest Bretagne Airport, France, IATA code
- Bloodstream expression site, a transcription unit in a genome
- British Election Study
- British Ecological Society, a learned ecology society founded in 1913

== People ==
- Cristina Bes Ginesta (born 1977), Catalan ski mountaineer
- Maria Elisabeth Bes (1882–1938), Dutch chemical engineer and city councillor in Delft
