= Betsey Brown =

1985 novel by Ntozake Shange

- First edition cover
- Author: Ntozake Shange
- Language: English
- Genre: African-American literature
- Published: 1985
- Publisher: St. Martin's Press
- Publication place: United States of America
- Media type: Print
- Pages: 207
- ISBN: 0312077270
- OCLC: 11624091
- Preceded by: Sassafrass, Cypress & Indigo
- Followed by: Liliane

Betsey Brown is an African-American literature novel by Ntozake Shange, published in 1985.

== Plot ==
Betsey Brown is the story of an adolescent African-American girl growing up in 1959 St. Louis, Missouri, who is part of the first generation of students to be integrated in the public school system. She navigates common adolescent issues such as family dynamics, first love, and identity questions.

== Major themes ==
Thematic concerns of the novel include African-American family life, coming of age, feminism, and racial freedom. One critic described the narrative structure of the novel as paralleling "the personal story of Betsey’s attaining self-confidence with the social achievements of the Civil Rights Movement." This structure allows Shange to address feminist issues in addition to racial issues.

== Development history ==
In order to write the novel, Shange drew on her own experiences growing up in St. Louis, but the resulting novel is not entirely autobiographical. Nevertheless, like Betsey Brown, Shange really did know such African-American celebrities as Chuck Berry and W. E. B. Du Bois.

== Publication history ==
Betsey Brown was published in 1985 by St. Martin's Press.

== Explanation of the novel's title ==
Set in the aftermath of Brown v. Board of Education —the landmark case in which the US Supreme Court ruled that laws establishing separate public schools for black and white students were unconstitutional—the novel is eponymous.

== Literary significance and reception ==
Though perhaps the least known of Shange's work, the novel has been called "a little gem".

== Adaptations ==
Shange adapted the novel into a musical play, which has been performed in various cities.
