= Lake Bess =

- Location of Lake Bess in Florida Location of Lake Bess in the USA
- Location: Polk County, Florida
- Coordinates: 27.9667°N 81.6534°W
- Lake type: natural freshwater lake
- Basin countries: United States
- Max. length: 4,000 feet (1,200 m)
- Max. width: 2,385 feet (727 m)
- Surface area: 147 acres (59 ha)
- Surface elevation: 125 feet (38 m)
- Settlements: Winter Haven, Florida

Lake Bess is a natural freshwater lake southeast of Winter Haven, Florida. It is pear shaped and has a 147-acre (590,000 m^{2}) surface area. Two blocks from its northeast shore is a WalMart supercenter and just north of that is Cypress Gardens Boulevard. On its north-northwest side is a gated residential community. To its west is Lake Ruby. The two lakes are separated by a 40 feet (12 m) strip of land. On its south-southwest shore are residential developments. On its southeast is pastureland. On its east-northeast shore are two country clubs (Lake Bess Country Club and Care Free Country Club) and mobile homes.

Lake Bess is completely surrounded by private property. Therefore, it has no public swimming area or public boat ramp and there is no public access for fishing. Fishing can only be done by obtaining permission from property owners. The Hook and Bullet website, however, says this lake contains blue catfish, gar and crappie.
