= Mount Bess =

Mountain on Alberta/British Columbia boundary in Canada

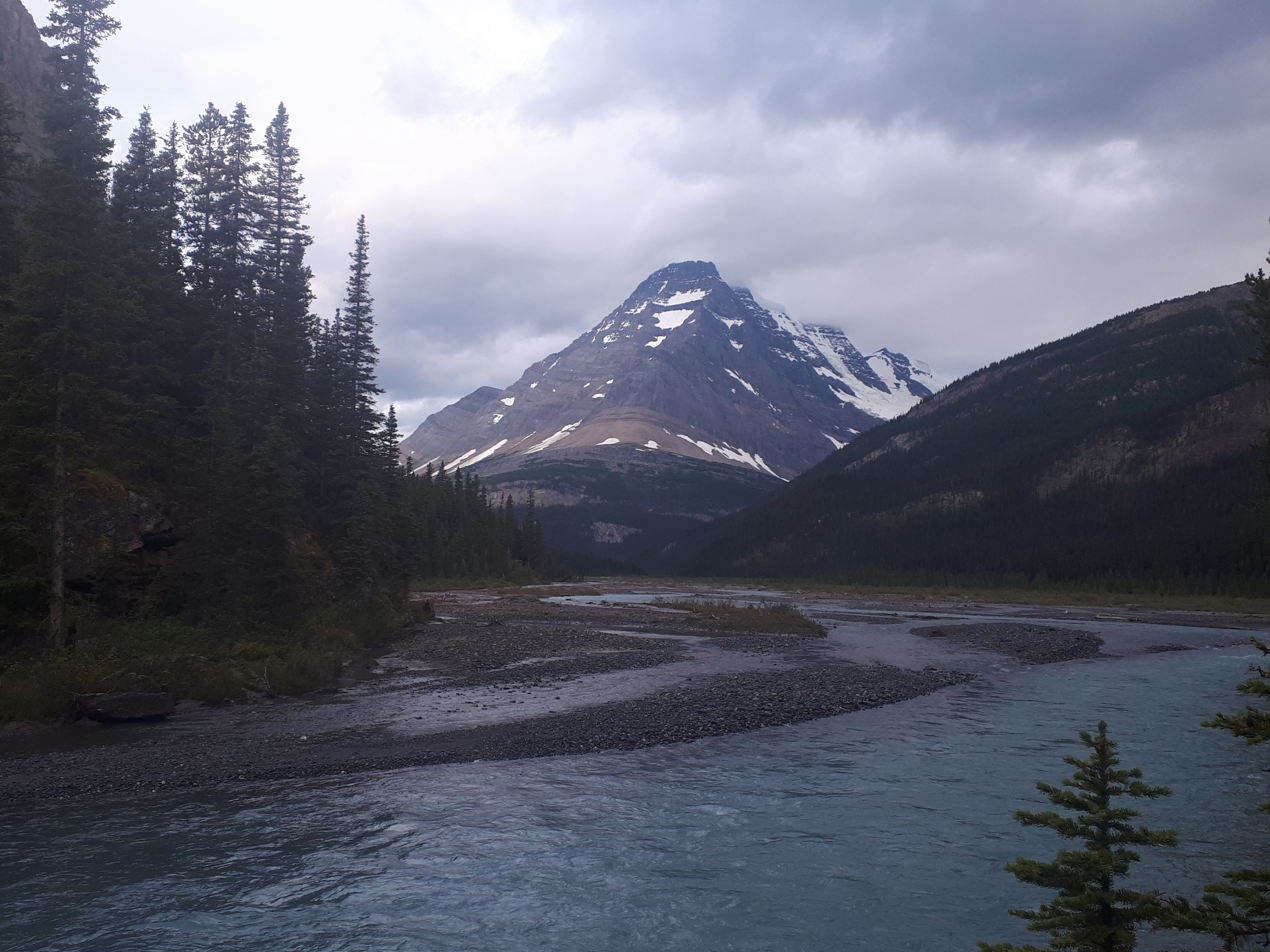
- Mount Bess viewed from Chown Creek

Highest point
- Elevation: 3,203 m (10,509 ft)
- Prominence: 618 m (2,028 ft)
- Parent peak: Mount Chown (3316 m)
- Listing: Mountains of Alberta; Mountains of British Columbia
- Coordinates: 53°20′59″N 119°22′38″W

Geography
- Location within Alberta Location within British Columbia Location within Canada
- Country: Canada
- Provinces: Alberta and British Columbia
- Parent range: Front Ranges
- Topo map: NTS 83E6 Twintree Lake

Climbing
- First ascent: 1911 by J. Norman Collie, A.L. Mumm, J. Yates

Mount Bess is located on the border of Alberta and British Columbia. It is the 83rd highest peak in Alberta. It was named in 1910 by J. Norman Collie after Bessie Gunn, who accompanied Collie's expedition.

== See also ==
- List of peaks on the Alberta–British Columbia border
