= Charles A. Bessey =

American soldier and Medal of Honor recipient

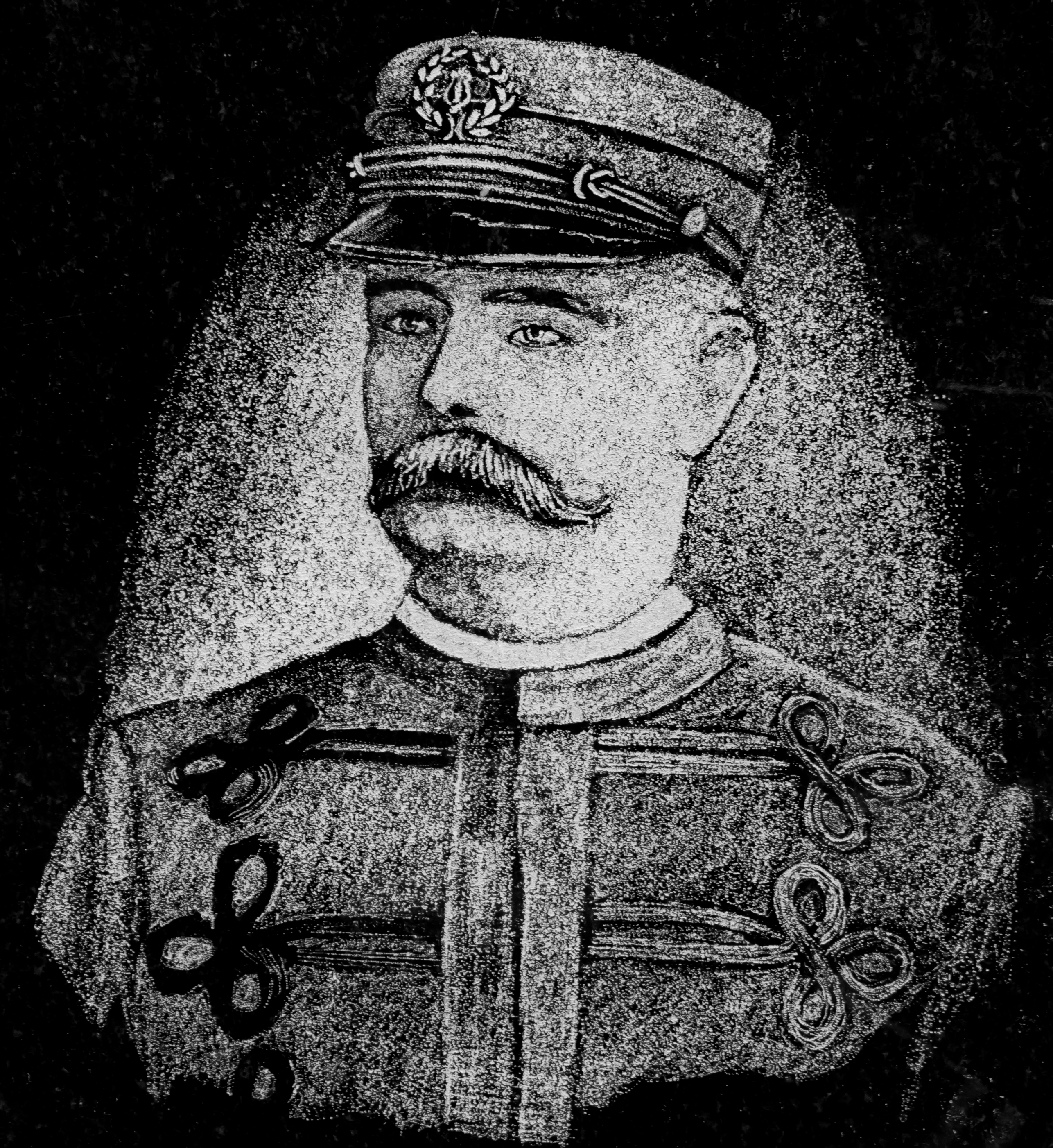
- Etched likeness on grave marker
- Born: 1848; Reading, Massachusetts
- Died: 1909 (aged 60–61)
- Burial place: Biloxi City Cemetery, Biloxi, Mississippi
- Military career
- Allegiance: United States
- Branch: United States Army
- Rank: Sergeant
- Unit: 3rd Cavalry Regiment
- Conflicts: Great Sioux War of 1876-77
- Awards: Medal of Honor

Charles A. Bessey (1848–1909) was a United States Army soldier and a recipient of the United States military's highest decoration, the Medal of Honor, for his actions in the Indian Wars of the western United States.

== Biography ==
Bessey was born in Reading, Massachusetts in 1848. By January 13, 1877, he was serving as a corporal in Company A of the 3rd Cavalry Regiment in the midst of the Great Sioux War of 1876-77.

On that day, Bessey and three privates were repairing a telegraph line between Forts Laramie and Fetterman in eastern Wyoming Territory when they learned that Native Americans had attacked three herders close by, near Elkhorn Creek. Bessey led his small group against the much larger Native American force and successfully rescued the herders, although he and two of his men were wounded in the process. For these actions, the four men were commended in general orders and, thirteen years later on May 15, 1890, Bessey was awarded the Medal of Honor.

Bessey was later promoted to sergeant and became Chief Musician of his regiment. He retired in 1899 and died ten years later of kidney failure, probably caused by the wound he received near Elkhorn Creek. Aged 60 or 61 at his death, he was buried in Biloxi City Cemetery, Biloxi, Mississippi.

After his death, his Medal of Honor was held by his daughter, who displayed it in her home. A hurricane destroyed the house and the medal was thought to be lost, but was eventually found in the wreckage. The family then donated the medal to the Third Cavalry Museum at Fort Hood, Texas.

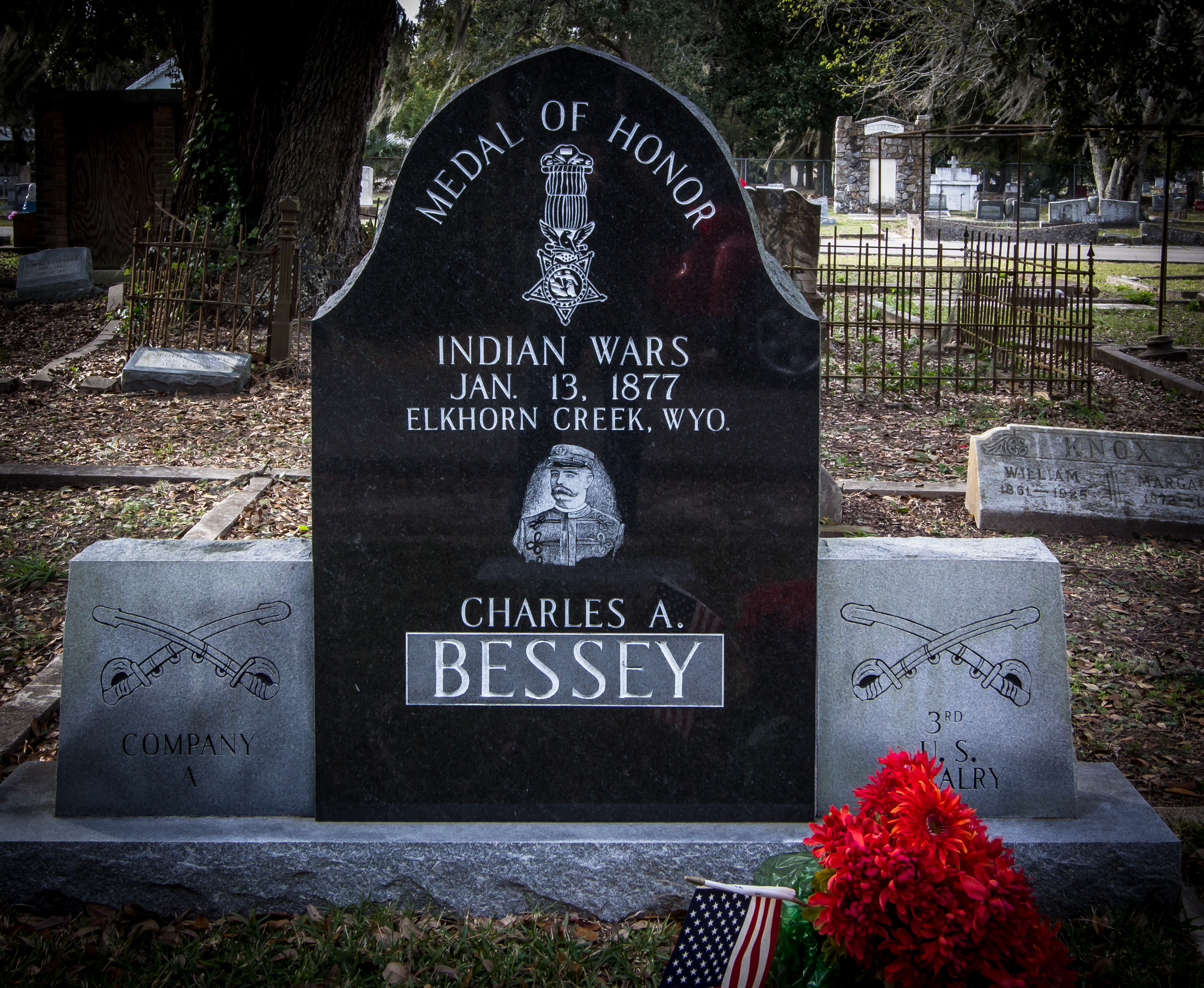
Charles Bessey Grave

== Medal of Honor citation ==
Bessey's official Medal of Honor citation reads:

While scouting with 4 men and attacked in ambush by 14 hostile Indians, held his ground, 2 of his men being wounded, and kept up the fight until himself wounded in the side, and then went to the assistance of his wounded comrades.

== See also ==
- List of Medal of Honor recipients
