= Besséʼ =

Prehistoric fossil from Sulawesi, Indonesia

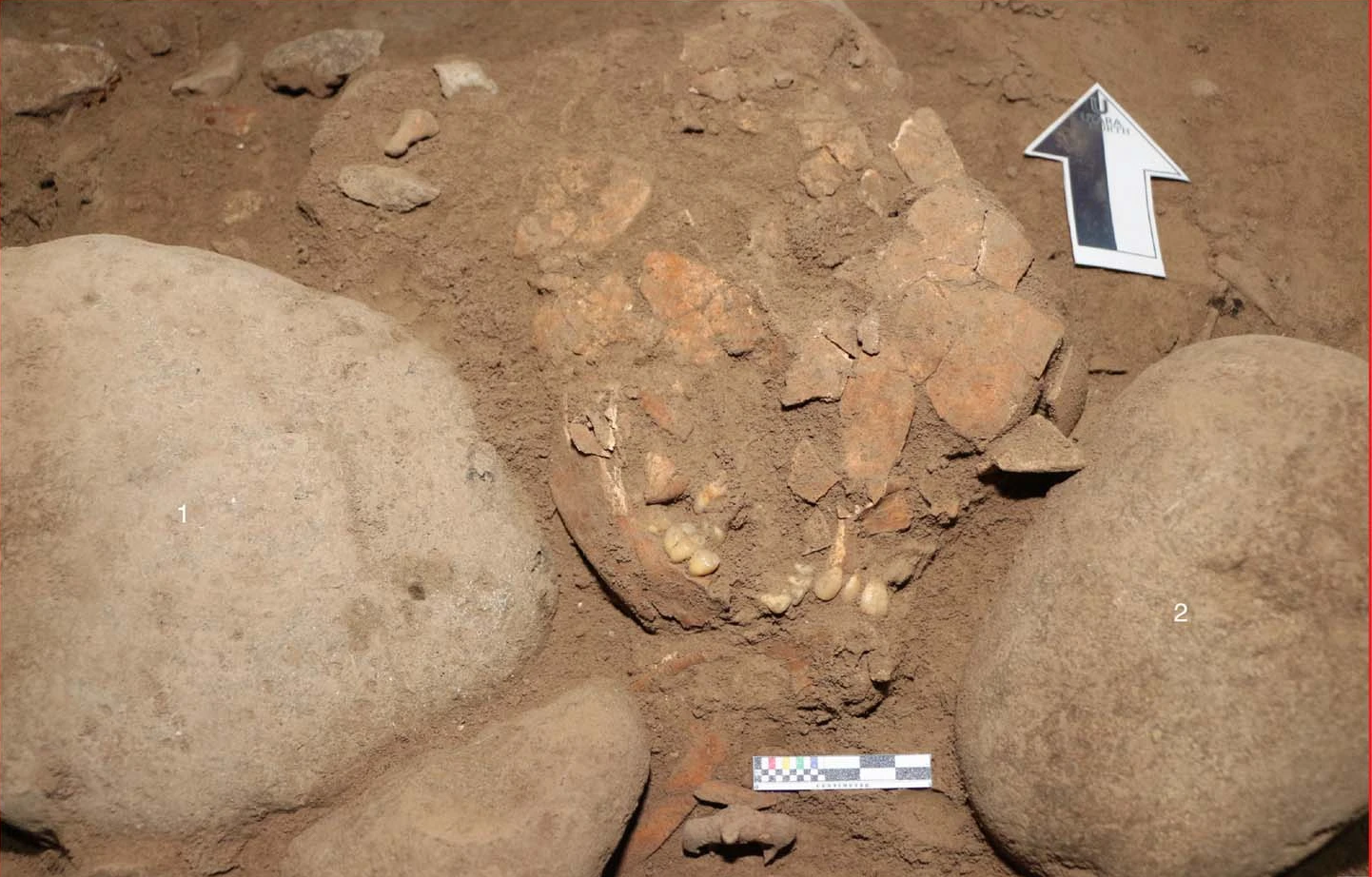
Besséʼ head, cracked and fragmented, surrounded by two cobbles

Besséʼ (pronounced [bəˈsːɛʔ]) is the prehistoric fossil of a young woman over 7,200 years old found in the Indonesian island of Sulawesi. Discovered at Leang Panninge ("bat cave" in Bugis language) at the Maros Regency by archaeologists from the University of Hasanuddin in 2015, its formal description including genome sequencing was published in Nature in 2021. As the first human remain discovered belonging to the Toalean people, it provides critical understanding to human culture and migration during the Holocene period of Asia. The nickname is adopted from the Bugis's custom of affectionately calling their newborn baby girls.

DNA samples recovered from the inner ear bones of Besséʼ became the first ancient human DNA to be genetically analysed and sequenced. For this reason, she is referred to as the "genetic fossil."

== Discovery ==
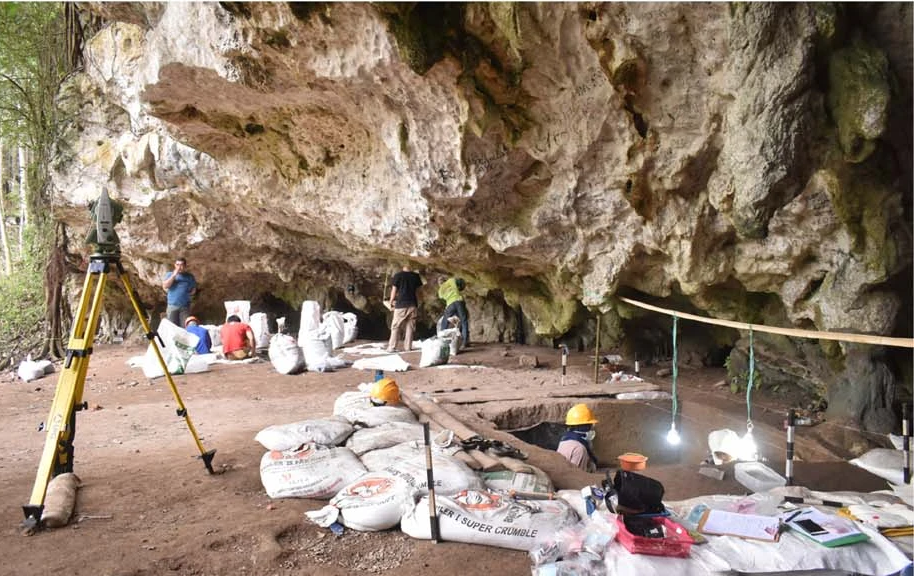
Excavation at Leang Panninge in 2019 showing the burial site

Southern Sulawesi had been a centre of archaeological exploration in understanding the Toalean culture. Research team of the Balai Arkeologi Sulawesi Selatan (South Sulawesi Archaeological Centre) led by Akin Duli from the University of Hasanuddin, Sulawesi, first explored Leang Panninge in 2015. The excavations uncovered many animal remains and stone tools of the Toalean people, including a burial site that contained human remains of one individual. The human remains were discovered after three days of excavation. It was the first time a human remain is discovered that belonged to the Toalean culture.

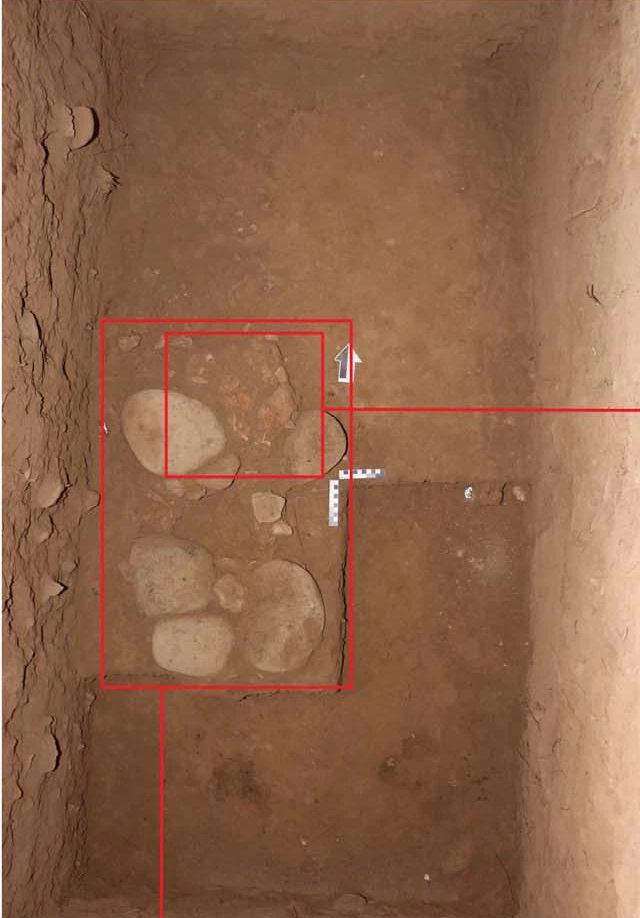
The inside of the grave showing position of the burial

Duli's research team in collaboration with an international team of palaeontologists led by Adam Brumm of the Griffith University, Australia, made a comprehensive excavation and, in 2019, discovered partially intact bones of the inner ear from the human remains. The bone powder yielded sufficient DNA sample for genetic analysis. It was a lucky find because, as Brumm explained, "The humid tropics are very unforgiving on DNA preservation in ancient human bones and teeth." With the help of geneticist Selina Carlhoff of the Max Planck Institute, Germany, DNA analysis was performed that showed it as belonging to a young female hunter-gatherer who was aged around 17–18 years at her time of death. The study published in the August 2021 issue of Nature, became the first ancient DNA of any human in Southeast Asia to be sequenced.

=== Name ===
After the initial discovery in 2015, researchers at the University of Hasanuddin gave the name Besséʼ. The name is used by the Bugis people living in the southern Sulawesi as an affectionate name for their newborn girls. The researchers chose it for the ancient woman remain, which so far remain the only known individual of the Toalean people, as a homage to her people and discovery.

== Burial features ==
Besséʼ was buried in a foetal position and partially covered by large cobbles. The typical burial style also provided an example of modern human evolution and cultural development in Southeast Asia. The tightly flexed burial of Besséʼ with the legs crouched with the legs folded up to the chest was a traditional practice, and use of cobbles to cover the corpses are marks of careful rituals in many prehistoric cultures of the region. With cobbles all around her body and under her head, Bessé' was also evidently buried with proper burial processions.

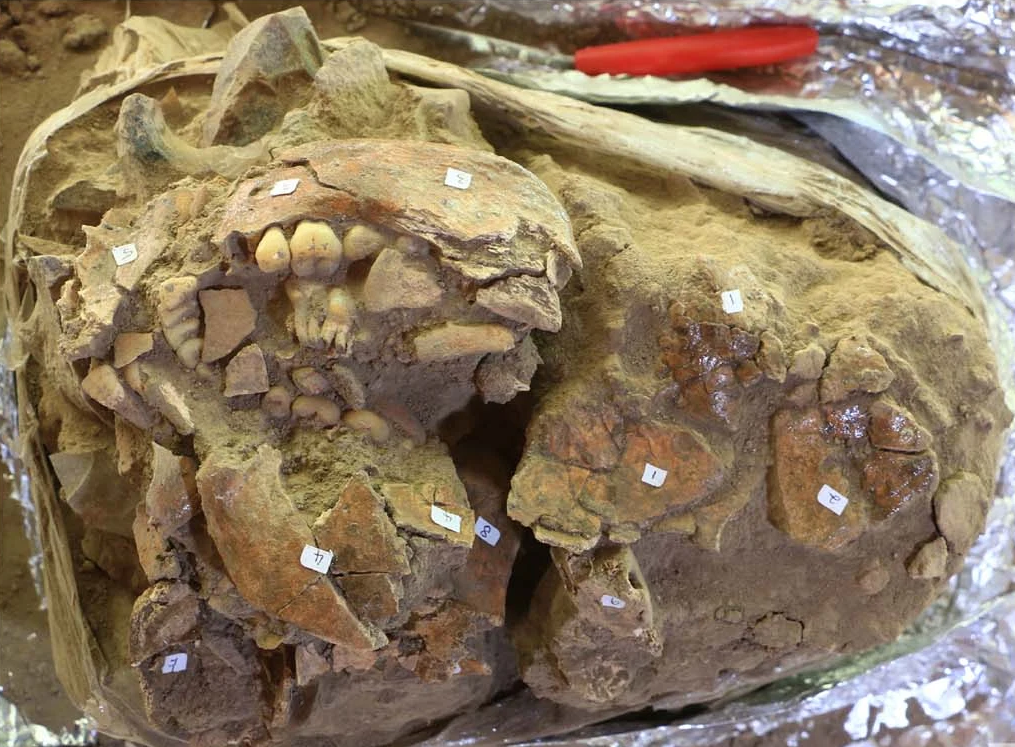
Besséʼ's skull

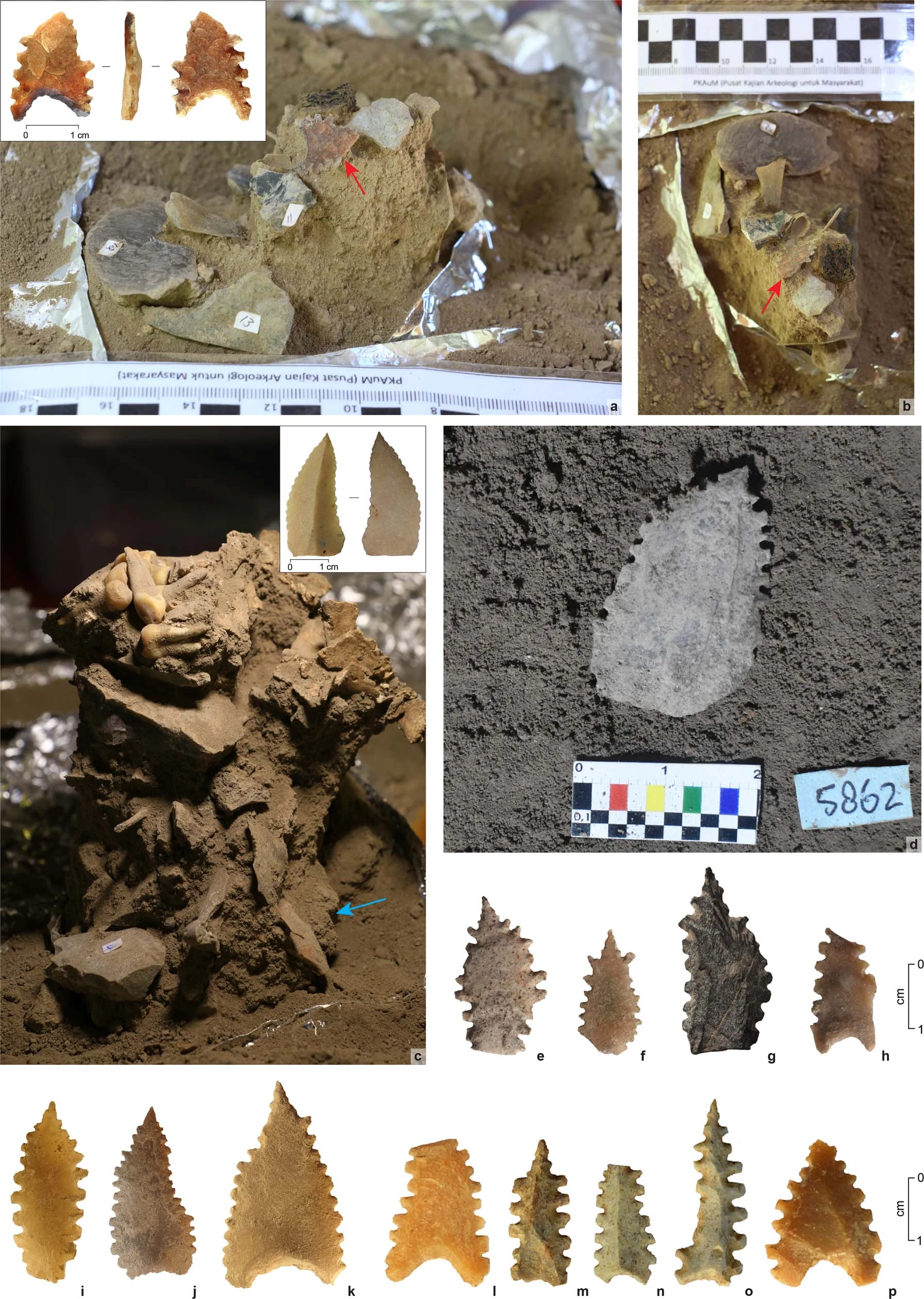
Stone tools at Besséʼ's grave. Maros point is on top inset.

The cause of Besséʼ's death is unknown with no obvious signs of injuries or infections that leave their mark in bone. Stone tools (including stone arrows known as Maros points) and red ochre were found alongside her body, indicating they were buried with her, as well as the bones of animals known to be hunted. The skull was already crushed and was recovered in fragments. Using carbon-14 dating of a galip nut seed (Canarium sp.) found in her grave, she was estimated to have died 7,300 to 7,200 years ago.

== Genetic analysis ==
DNA samples were collected from the petrous part of the temporal bone (inner ear) of Besséʼ. It was the first DNA sample of prehistoric humans in Southeast Asia, and it provided the first direct genetic study of the Toalean people. Genomic analysis shows Besséʼ belonged to a population with a previously unknown ancestral composition. She shares about half of her genetic makeup with present-day indigenous Australians and people in New Guinea and the Western Pacific, along with a previously unknown divergent human lineage that branched off approximately 37,000 years ago (after Onge-related and Hòabìnhian-related lineages) including substantial DNA (about 2.2%) inherited from the now-extinct humans Denisovans.

=== Implication on human migration ===
Besséʼ's age and DNA analysis indicate that she belonged to a group whose ancestors migrated from the mainland Asia towards the south, thereby becoming ancestors of the original inhabitants of Wallacean islands (covering Sulawesi to Australia and New Guinea). She is genetically distinct from modern-day humans of the region and any other known prehistoric humans. She is most (genetically) closely related to the aboriginal Australians and New Guineans. A trace of her genetic lineage with people in east Asia provides evidence of new pattern of migration route never known before in Southeast Asia.

Historical research puts the earliest human colonisation of Wallacea around 3,000 to 4,000 years ago. Genetic evidences normally give the first human migration through Southeast Asia (from Wallacea to then a supercontinent called Sahul) around 55,000 years ago, the oldest estimate being 65,000 years ago. This implies that humans migration into Wallacea must have been much earlier; but, direct evidences are still lacking.

Besséʼ at 7,200 years old is an important variation to the established evidences of Wallacean occupation, indicating that there were people who moved there before any of the previously known migration. It further adds to time range for Toalean culture, which is generally considered as prevailing between 2,000 and 7,000 years ago. Her genetic link to east Asian people indicates that eastward migration could have taken place 50,000 years ago from Sulawesi. It also suggests that modern humans and Denisovans met and interbred at Wallacea, and possibly in Sulawesi.
