= Bessy Gallardo =

Chilean politician

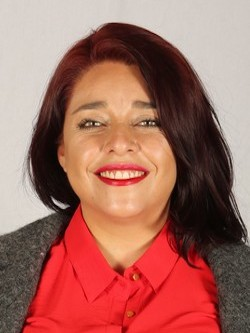
- Bessy Gallardo in 2021.

Member of the Constitutional Convention
- In office 4 July 2021 – 4 July 2022
- Constituency: 8th District

Personal details
- Born: 31 December 1984 (age 41) Santiago, Chile
- Education: University of the Americas (LL.B)
- Occupation: Lawyer

Bessy Gallardo Prado (born 31 December 1984) is a Chilean feminist activist, law graduate, and independent politician.

She served as a member of the Constitutional Convention between 2021 and 2022, representing the 8th District of the Santiago Metropolitan Region.

== Early life and education ==
Gallardo was born on 31 December 1984 in Santiago, Chile. She is the daughter of Omar Gallardo Ulloa and Mireya Prado Ocaranza. She is the mother of three children.

She completed her primary and secondary education at Colegio Santa Teresita del Niño Jesús, graduating in 2002. She later studied law at the Universidad de Las Américas, from which she graduated as a law candidate.

== Professional career ==
Gallardo worked in the retail sector before becoming involved in social activism. She served as vice president of the NGO Red Infancia Chile, an organization dedicated to the promotion and defense of the rights of children and adolescents. She was also legal director of the Fundación Honra, focused on the prevention of violence against women, until 2019.

In addition, she has carried out community-based work in the Ferrocarril informal settlement in the municipality of Maipú.

== Political career ==
Gallardo is an independent politician. In the elections held on 15–16 May 2021, she ran for the Constitutional Convention representing the 8th District of the Santiago Metropolitan Region, as an independent candidate on the Progressive Party ticket within the Lista del Apruebo pact. She was elected with 9,601 votes, corresponding to 2.12% of the valid votes cast.

On 6 December 2021, she announced her resignation from the Apruebo Collective and formally joined the Chile Digno collective on 29 December 2021.
