= Bessie (disambiguation) =

Bessie is a feminine given name. It may also refer to:

- Alvah Bessie (1904-1985), American novelist, journalist and screenwriter blacklisted as one of the Hollywood Ten
- Bessie (lake monster), a legendary Lake Erie monster
- Bessie (narrowboat), a boat in the West Country Living Museum, England
- Bessie Awards in dance, the New York Dance and Performance Awards
- "Bessie", a 1972 biography of Bessie Smith written by American journalist Chris Albertson
- Bessie (film), a 2015 biographical film based on the life of Bessie Smith
- Bessie, Oklahoma, United States, a town
- Besant Nagar, a neighborhood of the Indian city of Chennai sometimes referred to as "Bessie"
