= Betsy =

Betsy is an English feminine given name, often a nickname for Elizabeth.

== People ==
- Betsy Aidem (born 1957), American actress
- Betsy Alison (born 1960), American sailor
- Betsy Ancker-Johnson (1927–2020), American plasma physicist
- Betsy Arakawa (1959–2025), American musician
- Betsy Atkins (born 1953), American business executive and entrepreneur
- Betsy Baker (born 1955), American actress
- Betsy Bakker-Nort (1874–1946), Dutch lawyer and politician
- Betsy Balcombe (1802−1871), English friend of Napoleon I at Saint Helena
- Betsy Bang (c. 1912–2003), biologist, illustrator and translator
- Betsy Barr (born 1981), American soccer player
- Betsy Beard (born 1961), American coxswain
- Betsy Becker, American researcher
- Betsy Beers (born 1957), American television and film producer
- Betsy Beutler (born 1988), American actress
- Betsy Blackwell (c. 1905–1985), American journalist
- Betsy Blair (1923–2009), American actress
- Betsy Bloomingdale (1922–2016), American socialite
- Betsy Dewar Boyce (1913–2007), Canadian historian
- Betsy Boze, American academic and education administrator
- Betsy Brandt (born 1973), American actress
- Betsy Brantley (born 1955), American actress
- Betsy Brown (born 1963), American poet
- Betsy Bryan (born 1949), American Egyptologist
- Betsy Butler (born 1963), American politician
- Betsy Byars (1928–2020), American author
- Betsy B. Carr (born 1946), American politician
- Betsy or Betty Careless (c. 1704 – 1739), English courtesan
- Betsy Clifford (born 1953), Canadian alpine skier
- Betsy Close (born 1950), American politician
- Betsy Coffia (born 1977), American politician
- Betsy Z. Cohen (born 1941), American business executive
- Betsy Colquitt (1927–2009), American writer
- Betsy Cook, American-born singer, songwriter and musician
- Betsy Mix Cowles (1810–1876), American abolitionist
- Betsy Cullen (born 1938), American professional golfer
- Betsy Curtis (1917–2002), American writer
- Betsy Damon (born 1940), American artist
- Betsy Devine (born 1946), American journalist
- Betsy DeVos (born 1958), American businesswoman and politician
- Betsy DiSalvo (born 1969), American professor
- Betsy Drake (1923–2015), American actress, writer and psychotherapist
- Betsy Drambour (born 1965), American soccer player and golfer
- Betsy Driver, mayor of Flemington and intersex activist
- Betsy Dunn, American politician and member of the Vermont House of Representatives
- Betsy Eby (born 1967), American painter
- Betsy Ettorre (born 1948), Anglo-American feminist sociologist
- Betsy Robertson Eyre (1911–1983), New Zealand teacher, community worker and local politician
- Betsy Fagin (born 1972), American poet
- Betsy Fogle, American politician
- Betsy Foxman, American epidemiologist
- Betsy Freese, American editor, blogger, and radio personality
- Betsy von Furstenberg (1931–2015), German-American actress
- Betsy Gay (1929–2025), American yodeler and actress
- Betsy Gotbaum (born 1938), New York City Public Advocate
- Betsy Gray (1780–1798), Irish folkloric figure
- Betsy Brannon Green (born 1958), American novelist
- Betsy Greer, American writer
- Betsy Hager (1750–1843), farmer and blacksmith during the American Revolution
- Betsy Haines (born 1960), American skier
- Betsy Hands, American politician
- Betsy Hannig (born 1963), American politician
- Betsy Harris (born 1972), American basketball coach
- Betsy Harrison Gagne (1947–2020), American botanist
- Betsy Hart (born c. 1963), American journalist
- Betsy Hassett (born 1990), New Zealand football player
- Betsy Haynes, American author
- Betsy Heard (1759–1810s), Euro-African slave trader and merchant
- Betsy Heimann, American costume designer
- Betsy Hill, American rugby union player
- Betsy Ann Hisle (1917–1978), American child actress
- Betsy Hodges (born 1969), mayor of Minneapolis
- Betsy Holden (born 1955), American businesswoman
- Betsy Holland (born 1976), American politician
- Betsy Hoza, American clinical psychologist
- Betsy Humphreys (born 1947), American medical librarian
- Betsy Rivers Jackes (born 1935), Australian botanist and author
- Betsy James, American youth fiction writer and illustrator
- Betsy Jochum (1921–2025), American baseball pitcher
- Betsy Johnson (born 1951), American politician
- Betsy Jolas (born 1926), French composer
- Betsy Jones-Moreland (1930–2006), American actress
- Betsy Joslyn (born 1954), American actress and singer
- Betsy Kaufman, American visual artist
- Betsy King (born 1955), American golfer
- Lizzie Lloyd King (1847–?), also known as Betsy King, alleged murderer of Charles Goodrich
- Betsy Leondar-Wright (born 1956), economic justice activist, sociologist, and author
- Betsy Levy Paluck, American psychology professor
- Betsy Lewin (born 1937), American illustrator
- Betsy Lobb (1868–1956), British businesswoman
- Betsy Love Allen, Chickasaw merchant and planter
- Betsy Markey (born 1956), American politician
- Betsy Martin (born 1970), American journalist
- Betsy McCaughey (born 1948), American politician
- Betsy McLaughlin (born 1960), American businesswoman
- Betsy Flagg Melcher (1900–1991), American miniature portraitist
- Betsy Mitchell (born 1966), American swimmer
- Betsy Munoz, American politician
- Betsy Nagelsen (born 1956), American former professional tennis player
- Betsy Norden (born 1945), American soprano
- Betsy Palmer (1926–2015), American actress
- Betsy Pecanins (1954–2016), American-born Mexican singer, songwriter and record producer
- Betsy Perk (1833–1906), Dutch author
- Betsy Plank (1924–2010), American public relations executive
- Betsy Price (born 1949), American mayor
- Betsy Prioleau, American author
- Betsy Randle (born 1955), American actress
- Betsy Rawls (1928–2023), American golfer
- Betsy Reed (born 1968), American journalist and editor
- Betsy Repelius (1848–1921), Dutch painter and watercolorist who specialized in simple, one-figure, genre scenes
- Betsy Graves Reyneau (1888–1964), American portrait painter
- Betsy Rosenberg, American Radio host
- Betsy King Ross (1922–1989), American actress, anthropologist and author
- Betsy Ross (1752–1836), American patriot credited with sewing the first American flag
- Betsy Rue (born 1979), American actress
- Betsy Russell (born 1963), American actress
- Betsy Ruth (born 1985), American wrestler, ring name Mary Kate
- Betsy Rutherford (1944–1991), American singer
- Betsy Saina (born 1988), Kenyan athlete
- Betsy Schneider, American photographer
- Betsy Shaw (born 1965), American snowboarder
- Betsy Sheridan (1756–1837), Anglo Irish diarist
- Betsy Sholl, American poet
- Betsy Snite (1938–1984), American alpine ski racer
- Betsy Sodaro (born 1984), American actress and comedian
- Betsy Stanko (born 1950), American criminologist
- Betsy Stark, American television journalist
- Betsy Stovall, American mathematician
- Betsy Struthers (born 1951), Canadian poet and novelist
- Betsy Struxness, American actress, singer, and dancer
- Betsy Sullivan (born 1956), Jamaican diver
- Betsy Thom, British sociologist
- Betsy Thomas, American screenwriter
- Betsy Thornton, American novelist
- Betsy Thunder, Native American medicine woman
- Betsy Túrnez (born 1974), Spanish actress
- Betsy Wade (1929–2020), American journalist and columnist
- Betsy Warland, American feminist writer
- Betsy Warrior (born 1940), American feminist and author
- Betsy Weatherhead, American climatologist
- Betsy Weiss, lead singer of Bitch (band)
- Betsy Wergin (born 1952), American politician
- Betsy West, American producer, filmmaker and video journalist
- Betsy Westendorp-Osieck (1880–1968), Dutch painter
- Betsy Whyte, Scottish traveler, traditional-bearer, folksinger and storyteller
- Betsy Wieseman (born 1958), American art historian and curator
- Betsy Wolfe (born 1982), American actress and singer
- Betsy Wolfston, American artist
- Betsy Wollheim (born 1951), American science fiction editor
- Betsy Woodruff Swan (born 1989), American journalist
- Betsy Wyeth (1921–2020), American author and collector
- Betsy Yanik, American mathematics educator
- Betsy Youngman (born 1959), American skier

== Dogs ==
- Betsy (dog), an Austrian Border Collie credited with high intelligence

== Fictional characters ==
- Betsy, main character in the Betsy series of children's books by Carolyn Haywood
- Betsy, recurring character in Curious George
- Betsy Bobbin, in the Oz books
- Elizabeth "Betsy" Braddock, Marvel Comics superheroine also known as Psylocke and Captain Britain
- Betsy Ray, protagonist of the Betsy-Tacy series of novels by Maud Hart Lovelace
- Betsy Chernak Taylor, on the canceled American soap opera Love is a Many Splendored Thing
- Betsy, an infected monkey in the film Outbreak
- Elizabeth Ann, main character of the novel Understood Betsy by Dorothy Canfield Fisher

== See also ==
- Betsey (disambiguation)
