= Yanik =

Yanik or Yanık is a name. Notable people with the name include:

- Yanik Frick (born 1998), Liechtensteiner footballer
- Betsy Yanik, American mathematics educator
- Derya Yanık (born 1972), Turkish politician
- Dorothy Cavalier Yanik (1928–2015), American artist
- Serkan Yanık (born 1987), Turkish footballer
- Viola Yanik (born 1982), Canadian wrestler

== See also ==
- Yanik Tepe, Bronza Age site in Iran
- Yanık Özbekler, Kızılcahamam, neighbourhood in Turkey
- Yannick
