= Alice Howard =

Alice Howard may refer to:

- Lizzie Lloyd King (1847–?), also known as Alice Howard, murderer of Charles Goodrich
- Alice Howard, 1st Countess of Wicklow (died 1807), Anglo-Irish peeress
