= Historians of Netherlandish Art =

Scholarly organization

- Formation: 1983
- Type: Scholarly organization
- Official language: English
- Website: https://hnanews.org/

Historians of Netherlandish Art (HNA) is an international scholarly organization devoted to the study of the art and material culture of the Low Countries from the medieval period through the twenty-first century.

Founded in 1983, the organization promotes research, publication, and professional exchange among scholars, curators, conservators, and students working on Dutch art and Flemish art. The organization organizes biennial conferences held in Europe and North America and supports emerging scholars through grants and awards.

HNA maintains an online platform for news, professional opportunities, and resources related to Netherlandish art history.

== Journal of Historians of Netherlandish Art ==
Journal of Historians of Netherlandish Art
- Discipline: Art history
- Language: English
- Edited by: H. Perry Chapman (2021-), Allison Kettering (2008-2021)

Publication details
- History: 2008–present
- Publisher: Historians of Netherlandish Art
- Frequency: Biannual
- Open access: Yes
- License: Creative Commons Attribution-NonCommercial 4.1 International

Standard abbreviations
- ISO 4: J. Hist. Neth. Art

Indexing
- ISSN: 1949-9833
- LCCN: 2009262075
- OCLC no.: 952809317

Links
- Journal homepage; Online archive

HNA also publishes Journal of Historians of Netherlandish Art (JHNA), peer-reviewed open-access academic journal covering art history publication established in 2008/2009, which features research articles, exhibition reviews, and scholarly roundtables. It appears biannually and features original scholarship on Dutch, Flemish, German, and Franco-Flemish art and material culture.

=== Origins and impact ===
The journal grew out of the newsletters of Historians of Netherlandish Art—which originally included book reviews, and the last edition of that format was published in November 2017. As the newsletters moved into digital form, the reviews also shifted online, and the publication gradually developed into a journal that combined book reviews with peer-reviewed scholarly articles.

The American scholar and professor Allison Kettering was the founding editor in chief of the journal, from 2008-2021.

=== Later development ===
The journal has been discussed within broader scholarship on digital art history and digital publishing in the discipline, and situated alongside other major open-access digital art history journals in discussions of the field's development.

In 2016, the journal received support from the Gladys Krieble Delmas Foundation to modernize its digital architecture and enable digitally enhanced articles. In 2018, the journal announced that it had received a Kress Digital Resources Grant for 2019-2020, which supported the development of digitally enhanced art-historical scholarship.

In 2019, the historian Elizabeth Sutton stated of the journal and its importance to scholarship in the field of art history: "The Historians of Netherlandish Art (HNA), following inroads in digital collaborative and accessible website and archives by Dutch institutions, is currently sponsoring such scholarship through its online journal, JHNA, and digital projects."

=== Role in 2023 Vermeer attribution debate ===
The publication entered wider public view in the Guardian in 2023 when Betsy Wieseman of the National Gallery of Art, one of its contributors to an article on Johannes Vermeer, became a central voice in the widely reported debate over the attribution of the painting Girl with a Flute. The work had long been attributed to Vermeer, with her and her team reversing the attribution, with the Guardian writing: "The paint had been handled in a heavy-handed way that 'pooled and almost dripped', the team wrote in the Journal of Historians of Netherlandish Art."

=== Abstracting and indexing ===
The journal is abstracted and indexed in the Directory of Open Access Journals, EBSCO databases and the International Bibliography of Periodical Literature, and is also listed in MIAR.
