= Linda Williamson (folklorist) =

American-born academic (born 1949)

Linda Jane Williamson (née Rast, born 2 January 1949) is an American-born academic who specialises in the lore of Scotland's travelling people. She is credited with bringing the stories of traveller Duncan Williamson to a wider audience.

== Biography ==
Williamson was born in Madison, Wisconsin, USA to Thomas Robinson Rast and Thelma Jane Cass. From the age of six, she studied classical music, sang in choirs, performed as a pianist, and in chamber music. After graduating from the University of Wisconsin-Madison School of Music, she married American Mark Headlee. They settled in Edinburgh, Scotland so he could pursue a PhD in philosophy, and she entered an interdisciplinary program at the University of Edinburgh School of Scottish Studies, where she worked with several academics, including Hamish Henderson.

While in the program, Williamson began collecting traditional music, songs, stories, and lore of Scotland's Travelling People. She traveled with ethnomusicologist Peter Cooke, and folklorist Alan Bruford, to interview and record the Stewarts of Blair, Betsy Whyte of Montrose, and Jane Turriff of Mintlaw. (Linda is included in Whyte's dedication in her book Yellow on the Broom.) Through these contacts, she learned of Argyllshire Traveller Duncan Williamson, a widower with seven children, and sought him out as a source in 1975. Over the course of her work with him, the two fell in love. She sought a divorce from Headlee - which was granted - and married Duncan on 22 February 1977.

Williamson lived with Duncan in the traditional 'gelly camp', a Scottish Traveller tent structure. While living a rugged life and raising their two children, she completed her doctoral degree in 1985 for the School of Scottish Studies. Her recordings of Duncan's songs and stories, in addition to her collected lore, music, and history of Scotland's Travellers from Argyllshire, Perthshire, and Fife, were deposited in the School of Scottish Studies Sound Archives, catalogued with her commentary from 1975-1993. She worked to write verbatim from Duncan's narrations and secured publication of his stories in Edinburgh, New York, Cambridge, Oxford, London, and Milan.

Their relationship continued until 1993 when they separated, but Williamson continued to work with Duncan on new books and further editions of his stories. She returned to stay with him during the final months before his death from complications of a stroke on 8 November 2007.

Since 2007, Williamson has worked on myth and starlore in the ancient astronomies of Native America and India and performed at Edinburgh's Scottish International Storytelling Festival. She has also continued working as a professional storyteller through the Scottish Storytelling Centre in Edinburgh, Scotland.

=== Publications ===
Tales of the Seal People, a collection of fourteen stories about silkies includes 'The Silkie Painter' which was originally published under the title 'The Old Woman and the Seal' by Collins and was winner of the Scottish Short Story Award in 1984. Other collections published by Canongate (Edinburgh) of Williamson's stories include, Fireside Tales of the Traveller Children, The Broonie, Silkies and Fairies, Tell Me a Story for Christmas, May the Devil Walk Behind Ye, Don't Look Back, Jack!, The King and the Lamp, and The Horsieman: Memories of a Traveller 1928-1958.

Williamson was the editor of three books by Rhona Rauszer, all published by Birlinn Ltd.: Consider an Island: Eilean Sgitheanach (2004), The Light Fantastic: Stories of a Skye Woman (2005), and Ultima Thule: Stories From the Misty Isle - Eilean A' Cheo (2005). In 2009, she edited David Campbell's book, Out of the Mouth of the Morning: Tales of the Celt (Luath Press, 2009).

A doctoral dissertation based on Williamson's collections of her husband's stories was completed by Javier Cardeña Contreras for Universidad de Alcalá in 2014, and a selection of his stories, La Bruja del Mar: Y Otros Cuentos de los Hojalateros Escoceces, was translated to Spanish by Contreras and published by Calambur Narrative (Madrid) 2012.
