= Mark Greenwold =

American painter (born 1942)

- Born: Mark Greenwold; October 19, 1942; Cleveland, Ohio
- Known for: Painting
- Spouse: Betsy Kaufman

Mark Greenwold is an American painter, born in Cleveland, Ohio in 1942, whose subjects often include figures in psychologically charged domestic interiors, executed with pathologically laborious detail. He began exhibiting in New York in the late 1970s, where he currently lives and works. Though he came of age in an art world known for minimalist and conceptual trends, his work has always centered around the figure and his style has fallen somewhere between surrealism and photo realism.

== Biography ==
Mark Greenwold attended the Cleveland Institute of Art from 1962–1966. After which he continued his graduate studies at Indiana University Bloomington, earning his MFA in 1968. At Indiana, his professors were William Bailet and James McGarrell. After grad school, he moved to Seattle, where he got a teaching job. By 1986, he had relocated to Albany, where he had a teaching position at the State University. Mark Greenwold now lives and works in New York, NY.

== Artistic style ==
Mark Greenwold's paintings are best described as humans engaging in discomfiting behavior represented with pathologically laborious detail. He sees his art as a place to put all his mishigas. And, as that mishigas is often human-centered, the figure is absolutely central to what Greenwold paints. The subject matter always appears physiologically charged.

Greenwold's process is painstaking. Some of his paintings have taken him four entire years to complete. His pace has always been slow, steady, and intensive. He uses photography as a starting point, which includes taking source imagery from low-end interior design magazines and photographs of friends and family members. Richard Vine, in a 1993 Art in America review, explains: “Greenwold, who acknowledges an affinity with Woody Allen, subjects a repertory cast of relatives, lovers and friends to various emotional crises, blatant or implicit, while never quite letting go of a self-deprecating humor that is his best—and perhaps only—psychological defense.”

=== 1960s and 1970s ===
When Greenwold first embarked on his painting career after grad school, he was entering an art world concerned with little else other than minimalism and conceptualism. This was an art world dominated by Greenbergian modernism, which opposed everything Greenwold valued: space, content, emotion, sex, violence, and humor. Yet, he remained transfixed by the figure.

While still a student at Indiana, he spent six months working on one single painting: Furlough, which he finished in 1968. The style and pace of this painting would set the tone for the rest of Greenwold's career. The work is very much set within its own time frame. Much of his work in the 1970s, for example, took interiors that were classically seventies or used source imagery from porn magazines. But beyond that, the sexual excess of the seventies is represented by Greenwold as an orgiastic celebration of humanity.

Much of his career has been plagued by controversy. In 1973, Greenwold's Secret Storm was allegedly censored from publication in an exhibition catalogue for the show "12 Painters and the Human Figure" at the Santa Barbara Museum. While Greenwold suggested that the museum had shelved publishing the catalogue - an injustice to the other painters in the show - because of cries to censor his explicit painting, the director of the museum, Paul Mills, suggested that Greenwold's painting was never meant to be in the catalogue and that the production had ceased because Greenwold did not cooperate with other photography.

Along these same lines, an exhibition of one single painting was vehemently protested by art critic Lucy Lippard. The exhibition at Phyllis Kind in 1979, Brown's first solo show, included one single painting, Sewing Room, whose subject matter was a husband stabbing his wife with a pair of scissors. Lippard bemoaned Kind's exhibition of a painting that clearly glorified domestic abuse. Greenwold came to his own defense again, penning a letter for the Village Voice, in which he explained that simply depicting an event does not mean he was glorifying it.

=== 1980s and 1990s ===
By the 1980s, Greenwold was still focused primarily on placing the human figure in gaudy interiors. However, his style shifted slightly away from the tight almost photo realistic look of his previous paintings to a looser style. Also, in an effort to speed up his process, he shifted away from acrylic on large canvases and instead began using gouache and watercolor on a much smaller scale. Richard Vine, writing in Art in America in 1993, explained how Greenwold's style was reminiscent of Giotto and other Sienese painters of the fourteenth and fifteenth centuries. Grace Glueck described his style as similar to that of magic realism and surrealism, where every inch of the painting is rendered in precise detail; though his paintings are intense they are just ever so slightly too staged to be convincing.

=== 2000s ===
In the early 2000s, abstract designs made out of colored lozenge forms start appearing in Greenwold's paintings. These may be a reference to forms used by his friends and fellow artists, Chuck Close and James Siena. He stays true to the subject matter he always focused on, including interiors from architecture magazines and a depiction of the psychological landscape of dysfunctional family life.

== Exhibitions ==
=== Solo exhibitions ===
1979

- Mark Greenwold, Phyllis Kind Gallery, New York

1986–1987

- Mark Greenwold: Family Secrets, Phyllis Kind Gallery, New York, December 1986–January 1987

1993

- Mark Greenwold: Recent Works, Phyllis Kind Gallery, New York, March–April

1995–1996

- Mark Greenwold: The Odious Facts, 1975–1995, Colby College Museum of Art, Waterville, Maine, November 5–December 29, 1995; Neuberger Museum of Art, State University of New York, Purchase College, April 21–May 19, 1996

1997

- Mark Greenwold: A Man’s Worst Enemies, Phyllis Kind Gallery, New York, March 1–April 15

2002

- Mark Greenwold: You Must Change Your Life, DC Moore Gallery, New York, October 10–November 9

2007

- Mark Greenwold: A Moment of True Feeling, DC Moore Gallery, New York, October 10–November 10

2010

- Mark Greenwold: Secret Storm, 1967–1975, DC Moore Gallery, New York, March 18–April 17

2013

- Mark Greenwold: Murdering the World, Sperone Westwater Gallery, New York, May 10–June 28

2016

- Mark Greenwold: The Rumble of Panic Underlying Everything, Garth Greenan Gallery, New York, February 18–April 2

=== Group exhibitions ===
1968

- Drawings USA: 1968, Saint Paul Art Center, Minnesota

1969

- Annual Drawing and Small Sculpture Show, Ball State University, Muncie, Indiana, March 1–31
- Selections from Drawings USA, Charles H. MacNider Museum, Mason City, Iowa, July 27–September 3

1971

- San Francisco Art Institute Centennial Exhibition, Fine Arts Museums of San Francisco, January 15–February 28
- Drawings USA: 1971, Minnesota Museum of Art, Saint Paul, April 15–June 27

1973

- California Representation: Twelve Painters and the Human Figure, Santa Barbara Museum of Art, California, January 6–February 28

1975

- Artists of the Mohawk-Hudson Region, Art Gallery, State University of New York, Albany, June 27–August 8
- Unordinary Realities, Xerox Square Exhibition Center, Rochester, New York, September 12–November 2

1981

- Crimes of Compassion, Chrysler Museum of Art, Norfolk, Virginia, April 16–May 31

1988

- Art and the Law, Minnesota Museum of Art, Saint Paul, June 5–July 31

1991–1992

- Art on Paper, Weatherspoon Art Gallery, University of North Carolina, Greensboro, November 24, 1991 – January 5, 1992

1992

- My Father’s House Has Many Mansions, Phyllis Kind Gallery, New York, January–February
- Goodbye to Apple Pie: Contemporary Artists View the Family in Crisis, DeCordova Museum and Sculpture Park, Lincoln, Massachusetts, September 19–November 29

1993

- Invitational Exhibition of Painting and Sculpture, American Academy of Arts and Letters, New York, March 1–28

1994

- A Garden of Earthly Delights, Phyllis Kind Gallery, Chicago, April–March

1994–1995

- It’s How You Play the Game, Exit Art, New York, November 5, 1994 – February 11, 1995

1995

- American Art Today: Night Paintings, Art Museum, Florida International University, Miami, January 13–February 18
- Murder, Bergamot Station Arts Center, Santa Monica, California, February 3–April 1; Thread Waxing Space, New York, May 2–June 10; Centre Gallery, Wolfson Campus, Miami-Dade Community College, September 7–October 17

1998

- Original Scale, Apex Art, New York, January 8–February 7
- The Risk of Existence, Phyllis Kind Gallery, New York, November 7–December 30

2000

- S.P.s, Poor Traits, Idols, and Icons, Phyllis Kind Gallery, New York, April 22–May 13
- Private Worlds, Art in General, New York, May 29–July 8
- Plots and Intentions, Berrie Center for the Performing and Visual Arts, Ramapo College, Mahwah, New Jersey, November 1–December 6

2000–2001

- Collecting Ideas: Modern and Contemporary Works from the Polly and Mark Addison Collection, Denver Art Museum, November 18, 2000 – March 11, 2001

2001

- Self-Made Men, DC Moore Gallery, New York, April 4–May 5

2002

- The 177th Annual Exhibition of Contemporary American Art, National Academy Museum, New York, May 1–June 9

2003

- Ballpoint Inklings, K.S. Art, New York, April 10–May 24

2004

- Endless Love, DC Moore Gallery, New York, January 7–February 7
- It’s a Wonderful Life: Psychodrama in Contemporary Painting, Spaces Gallery, Cleveland, March 19–May 14
- Colored Pencil, K.S. Art, New York, April 1–May 8
- About Painting, Frances Young Tang Teaching Museum and Art Gallery, Skidmore College, Saratoga Springs, New York, June 26–September 26

2004–2005

- Disparities and Deformations: Our Grotesque, SITE Santa Fe, July 18, 2004 – January 9, 2005

2005

- Solitude and Focus: Recent Works by MacDowell Colony Fellows in the Visual Arts, Aldrich Museum of Contemporary Art, Ridgefield, Connecticut, January 23–June 22

2006

- The Space Between Us, Art Gallery, State University of New York, Albany, January 24–April 9
- Subject, Lyman Allyn Art Museum, New London, Connecticut, May 14–August 14
- The Figure in American Painting and Drawing, 1985–2005, Ogunquit Museum of American Art, Ogunquit, Maine, August 27–October 31

2006–2007

- Creative Imaginings: The Howard A. and Judith Tullman Collection, Mobile Museum of Art, Alabama, October 6, 2006 – January 7, 2007

2007

- The 182nd Annual Exhibition of Contemporary American Art, National Academy Museum, New York, May 16–June 24

2007–2008

- The Diane and Sandy Besser Collection, Fine Arts Museums of San Francisco, October 27, 2007 – January 13, 2008

2008

- Invitational Exhibition of Painting and Sculpture, American Academy of Arts and Letters, New York, March 6–April 6
- Sparks! The William T. Kemper Collecting Initiative, Nelson-Atkins Museum of Art, Kansas City, Missouri, May 3–July 20

2010

- Wall-to-Wall, Daniel Weinberg Gallery, Los Angeles, June 5–August 14
- Domestic Disturbances, David Klein Gallery, Birmingham, Michigan, September 10–October 16

2012–2013

- Untitled (Giotto’s O), Sperone Westwater Gallery, Lugano, Switzerland, November 30, 2012 – February 15, 2013

2014

- If You’re Accidentally Not Included, Don’t Worry About It, Galerie Zürcher, New York, April 5–May 3

2015

- Embracing Modernism: Ten Years of Drawings Acquisitions, Morgan Library and Museum, New York, February 13–May 24
- Intimacy in Discourse, Mana Contemporary, Jersey City, October 8–December 28

== Collections ==
- Cleveland Museum of Art
- Colby College Museum of Art, Waterville, Maine
- Hirshhorn Museum and Sculpture Garden, Smithsonian Institution, Washington, DC
- Indiana University Art Museum, Bloomington
- Metropolitan Museum of Art, New York
- Morgan Library and Museum, New York
- National Academy Museum, New York
- Nelson-Atkins Museum of Art, Kansas City, Missouri
- Whitney Museum of American Art, New York
