= Kate Ali =

American sculptor & educator (born 1977)

Kate Ali (born 1977) is an American visual artist based in Eugene, Oregon. She is a sculptor, teaching artist, and local arts education advocate who creates public works and sculptures. She is also a project manager for the Oregon Arts Commission’s Percent for Art program.

== Early life and education ==
Ali was born in 1977. Her father Walter Ali is a potter, and her mother, a seamstress. Ali attended Lane Community College in 2003 and Emily Carr Art Institute in 2004, earning a BFA from California College of the Arts in 2007.

== Career ==
Ali is Project Manager for the Oregon Arts Commission’s Percent for Art program. She also teaches at Lane Community College in the division of the arts.

As a member of Lane Arts Council’s board of directors, Ali helped shape arts education programs and a multi-year model of arts integration called Artcore, explorations in music, dance, theater, and visual arts disciplines, to "create an arts program that enhances the current curriculum as well as providing professional development for teachers".

Liora Sponko of the Lane Arts Council said, "Kate is an artist and a huge advocate for the arts in Lane County... an inspiration and often a go-to consultant in the arts for many of us. I so appreciate her vision and creativity and willingness to contribute". According to Bob Keefer of the Eugene Weekly, "Ali has considerable experience in public art as both an artist and as a project manager."

== Selected exhibitions ==
"Shelter in Place:Brick and Mortar", with Lee Imonen

"Don't Feed the Animals", 2017

"Dining Dynamics", 2006

"Ear to Wall", 2005

== Awards and honors ==
Ali received an Oregon Arts Commission Fellowship Grant for Visual Arts in 2008.

In 2014, Ali and artist Betsy Wolfston each received a 3-year $210,000 Oregon Community Foundation grant, "...to create an arts program that enhances the current curriculum as well as providing professional development for teachers". They developed curriculum in drawing and painting, sculpture, 3D art, multimedia arts, graphic design, theater and technology.
