= Duncan Williamson =

Scottish storyteller and singer

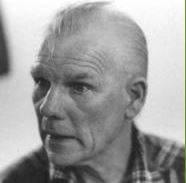
- Williamson in 1986
- Born: Duncan James Williamson; 11 April 1928; Loch Fyneside, Argyll and Bute, Scotland
- Died: November 8, 2007 (aged 79)
- Occupation: Storyteller

Duncan James Williamson (11 April 1928, Loch Fyneside, near Furnace, Argyll - 8 November 2007) was a Scottish storyteller and singer, and a member of the Scottish Traveller community. The Scottish poet and scholar Hamish Henderson once referred to him as "possibly the most extraordinary tradition-bearer of the whole Traveller tribe."

== Family ==
Williamson is reputed to have been born in a bow-tent on the banks of Loch Fyne, near the village of Furnace in Argyll, to Jock Williamson and Betsy Townsley, and was one of 16 children. He learned his repertoire of stories and songs from family, and other members of the Traveller community. His illiterate father was a basketmaker & tinsmith, and insisted that his children get an education, sending Williamson to school in Furnace. Like other Scottish travellers, the Williamson family lived in a fairly large tent during the winter months and took to the roads for the summer, walking from camping place to camping place and picking up seasonal work as they went. At age fourteen, he was apprenticed to a stonemason and dry stane-dyker. A year later, he left home with an older brother, travelling all over Argyll and Perthshire. He worked as a farm labourer, and later as a horse dealer. He was married to his first wife, Jeannie Townley (a distant cousin) in 1949 and had seven children together. Jeannie died in 1971.

On 22 February 1977, Williamson married the American-born musicologist/folklorist Linda Headlee, with whom he had two children. For the first four years of their marriage they lived in a tent, following which they lived in a cottage in Fife. It was largely through her that Duncan came into demand as a storyteller in Scottish schools, as well a featured performer at storytelling festivals both in the UK and abroad.

== Songs ==
Williamson inherited many old songs from his family and community which he had recorded between the 1970s and the early 2000s, many of which had almost never been recorded from traditional singers. These include the Child Ballads Thomas the Rhymer, Tam Lin and Bonnie George Campbell.

== International recognition ==
Williamson's life on the road in his teens and as a young married man is recounted in his oral autobiography, The Horsieman: Memories of a Traveller 1928-1958. From early on he developed a zest for storytelling as well as a love for the conviviality that attends "having a crack" (trading talk with friends or companions). His repertory of songs and stories continued to expand throughout his life, particularly after he gained entry to the world inhabited by folklorists by taking part in Scotland's folksong and storytelling revivals during the 1960s, 1970s, and 1980s.

In 1967 Williamson met the travellers' rights activist Helen Fullerton, a collector of traditional folktales, who had previously recorded his mother and siblings in 1958. Fullerton told another collector, Geordie MacIntyre, about Williamson, with MacIntryre making further recordings, also in 1967. In 1968, Williamson performed at the Blairgowrie Folk Festival.

Williamson met BBC producer David Campbell in 1987, who recorded his story "Mary and the Seal", and with whom he became friends.

Thanks chiefly to Linda's skill in editing his tape-recorded performances, a number of Duncan's stories came into print during his lifetime. A few audio recordings of his songs and stories have been issued commercially as well. Many more recordings remain in storage in personal or public archives, including the Sound Archive of the Department of Celtic and Scottish Studies at the University of Edinburgh and the Archive of Folk Culture at the Library of Congress, Washington DC.

Williamson's talents as a storyteller are celebrated in several books written by specialists in Scottish tradition and the art of oral narrative, including John D. Niles, author of Homo Narrans (1997); Timothy Neat, author of The Voice of the Bard (2002); Donald Braid, author of Scottish Traveller Tales (2002); and David Campbell, author of a pair of volumes titled A Traveller in Two Worlds. His colleague, John D. Niles, has written a biography and homage for Williamson.

== Works ==
=== Books (a select list) ===
- Fireside Tales of the Traveller Children (Edinburgh: Canongate, 1983)
- The Broonie, Silkies and Fairies: Travellers' Tales (Edinburgh: Canongate, 1985)
- Tell Me a Story for Christmas (Edinburgh: Canongate, 1987)
- A Thorn in the King's Foot: Folktales of the Scottish Travelling People (with Linda Williamson; New York: Penguin, 1987)
- May the Devil Walk Behind Ye! Scottish Traveller Tales (Edinburgh: Canongate, 1989)
- Don't Look Back Jack!: Scottish Travellers' Tales (Edinburgh: Canongate, 1990)
- The Genie and the Fisherman and Other Tales from the Travelling People (with Linda Williamson; Cambridge: Cambridge University Press, 1991)
- Tales of the Seal People: Scottish Folk Tales (Edinburgh: Canongate, 1992)
- The Horsieman: Memories of a Traveller 1928-1958 (Edinburgh: Canongate, 1994) (Autobiography)
- Rabbit's Tail (Cambridge: Cambridge University Press, 1996)
- The King and the Lamp: Scottish Traveller Tales (with Linda Williamson; Edinburgh: Canongate, 2000)
- The Land of the Seal People (Edinburgh: Birlinn, 2010) (Expanded edition of Tales of the Seal People, edited by Linda Williamson.)
- Jack and the Devil's Purse (Edinburgh: Birlinn, 2011) (Expanded edition of May the Devil Walk Behind Ye!, edited by Linda Williamson.)

=== Recordings (a select list) ===
- Put Another Log on the Fire: Songs and Tunes from a Scots Traveller. Veteran, 1994.
- Mary and the Seal and Other Folktales. Springthyme, 1986.
- Travellers Tales: Volumes 1 and 2. Recorded by Mike Yates. Kyloe, 2001–2002. Recordings of multiple individuals of whom one is Duncan Williamson.

== See also ==
- School of Scottish Studies, at Edinburgh University
