= Betsy Hands =

American politician

Member of the Montana House of Representatives from the 90th district
- In office 2007–2013

Personal details
- Party: Democratic Party
- Education: University of Michigan

Betsy Hands is a former Democratic Party member of the Montana House of Representatives who represented the 99th district from 2007 to 2013.

== Personal information ==
Betsy Hands knows how to speak French.

== Education ==
The schools that Betsy Hands attended were:

- University of Montana
- University of Michigan
- Breck School

== Career ==
Hands currently is the executive director at Montana Smart Growth Coalition and Representative at Montana State Legislature.

=== Previous career ===
- Energy and conservation director at Western Environmental Law Center
- Director at Hands on Consulting
- Mickelson Fellow at Western Governors' Association
- Executive director at Homeword
- Adjunct professor and research assistant at University of Montana
- Intern at Rocky Mountain Institute
- Instructor and course director at Outward Bound
- Community extension agent at Peace Corps
