= Betsy Hager =

- Born: Elizabeth Hager c. 1750 or 1755; Boston, Province of Massachusetts Bay, U.S.
- Died: July 12, 1843 (aged 88–93); Pennsylvania, U.S.
- Occupation(s): Blacksmith, farmer
- Spouse: John Pratt

Elizabeth Hager (c. 1750 or 1755 – 12 July 1843), known as Betsy or Betsey, was an American farmer and blacksmith who prepared weapons used in the early stages of the American Revolution. Betsey Hager had worked for a blacksmith and farmer named Samuel Leverett in Massachusetts. After the Battle of Concord, she noticed cannons that had been abandoned by the British. They were brought to Leverett's smithy, repaired, and subsequently used by the American forces. At the smithy, Hager repaired firearms and prepared ammunition. She also tended to the sick and wounded and was said to be proficient at using herbal remedies.

The Betsey Hager Chapter of the National Society Daughters of the American Revolution is located in Grand Island, Nebraska.

== Personal life ==
Hager married John Pratt on July 22, 1787, in Newton, Massachusetts. Both of them were from Framingham, Massachusetts. The couple moved to Pennsylvania in the early 1800s.

She died July 12, 1843, and is buried in the Vroman Hill Cemetery in West Burlington, Bradford County, Pennsylvania.
