= Betsy Thunder =

Native American medicine woman

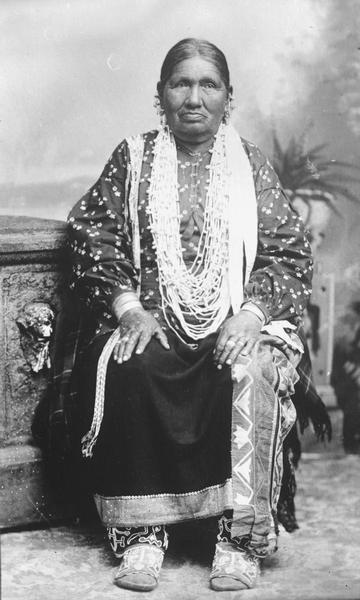
Betsy Thunder

Betsy Thunder (c. 1850s – 1913) was a medicine woman of the Ho-Chunk tribe, also known as the Winnebago Sky Clan. Thunder is believed to have been born in the 1850s on native Ho-Chunk land near Black River Falls in Wisconsin. Her exact birth year is not known due to the loss of spoken history. Thunder was part of the respected Decorah bloodline. Betsy Thunder married William Thunder, a medicine man to whom she became an apprentice for many years. William Thunder trained her to become a medicine woman with the hope of passing on the skills and practices of medicine men and women to future generations. Betsy Thunder had four sons to whom she passed down these skills to, one of which, John, also became a medicine man. Despite knowing little to no English Betsy Thunder is known for treating both Ho-Chunk and white patients alike. Thunder was paid for her healing services in common goods such as food, clothing, blankets and other essential goods.

== Medical practices ==
The practice of medicine men/women in the Ho-Chunk tribe before European contact, like in many other tribes at the time, consisted of the use of traditional dances and cultural rituals to heal the patient's soul. However, Betsy Thunder is said to have used herbs and other natural remedies to heal her patients. She first learned the practice of medicine by working as a nurse for her husband William Thunder. Betsy Thunder achieved her late husband's wishes of passing on the tradition and practices of medicine to her children and grandchildren. Both her son John Thunder and grandson Frank C. Thunder went on to become medicine men.

== Greatest accomplishment ==
Betsy Thunder was known for treating both Ho-Chunk and white patients alike. One of her greatest accomplishments was healing John Mills, the son of a white businessman, Hugh B. Mills, after all other white medical practices failed to improve John's health. Hugh B. Mills had Betsy Thunder brought to his house as a last effort to save his son's life. After several days of Thunder's remedies, using herbs and roots, the child recovered. Hugh Mills was extremely thankful for Thunder's work and in turn gave her enough lumber for a small cabin. The Mills family continued to show their gratitude for Betsy Thunder's work, so much so that when John Mills grew up to be a successful banker, he built a room in his house for Betsy Thunder to use when she visited the city and he went on to invite her to special family events such as dinners and weddings. An oil painting honoring Betsy Thunder was added to the Black River Memorial Hospital art collection in recognition of her respected position as medicine woman.

== Residence ==
Betsy Thunder lived near Black Rivers Falls on the land she called home. She stayed in the small cabin she earned through healing Mills for the rest of her life. The people in her community helped her build the small cabin on the lot of land that she owned out of gratitude for her work in the community. She resided in the small cabin until the early nineteen hundreds. As the U.S. government continued to expand into Ho-Chunk territory, the Ho-Chunk were forced to move from Wisconsin to Nebraska. However, Betsy Thunder refused and instead remained in her ancestral land in the mountains at Jackson County for the years leading up to her death in nineteen thirteen.

== Lineage ==
Betsy Thunder was a member of the Ho-Chunk tribe which originally resided in Fox River Valley in Aurora, Illinois. The Ho- Chunks first encounter with European settlers was when they met Jean Nicolet, a French explorer, in sixteen thirty-four. The Ho-Chunk people were described by the French as powerful and skilled warriors who were often in conflict with other tribes. The first French settlers also wrote of the strong role that women played in the Ho-Chunk tribe including that they also fulfilled the role of chief.

The Ho-Chunk tribe had a matrilineal society in the 1700s which is believed to be why women were allowed to fulfill positions of power which was not common to many other tribes at the time. The Ho-Chunks' last female chief was Ho-poe-kaw, meaning “Glory of the Morning”. She inherited her chiefdom from her father who is said to have been a powerful Ho-Chunk chief. She ruled for decades despite the losses of land and crops that came with European expansion. Ho-poe-kaw resisted such losses and continued to reside in her homelands, and like many others at the time, married a French fur trader with whom she had several children. Ho-poe-kaws bloodline, the Decorah bloodline, became a well respected name. The Decorah family is said to have become one of the most powerful Winnebago families, with many of its kin becoming respected members of the Ho-Chunk tribe and participating in the signing of peace treaties in the early 1800s. In the mid-1800s, when Betsy Thunder was born, some of the Ho-Chunk continued to reside in their ancestral lands in Wisconsin, but they continued to face challenges with western expansion. Betsy Thunder, like others in the Decorah lineage, gained the respect of her people through her practices as a medicine woman, and resided in her ancestral land until the time of her death.
