= Betsy Atkins =

American business executive and entrepreneur

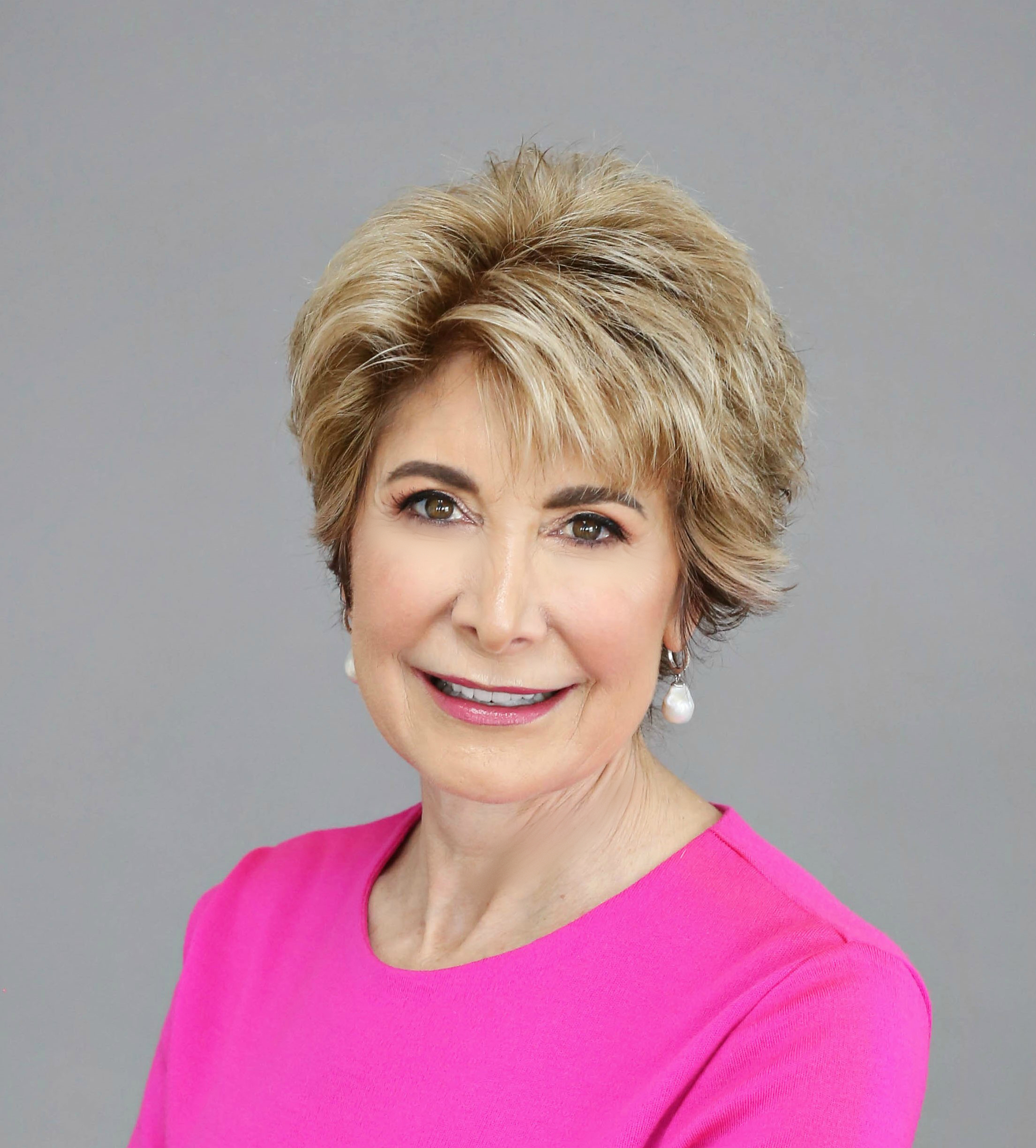
- Occupations: American business executive and entrepreneur
- Employer(s): Baja Corp, Clear Standards, Inc.
- Television: CNBC, Bloomberg, and Yahoo Finance as a corporate governance commentator
- Title: President and CEO
- Board member of: Wynn Resorts, Volvo Car Corporation, Florida International University's Health Care Network, Council on Foreign Relations
- Website: betsyatkins.com

Betsy Atkins is an American businesswoman. She was the chairman and chief executive officer (CEO) of the software provider Clear Standards, Inc. (acquired by SAP in 2010). She is president and CEO of Baja Corp, a venture capital investment firm she founded in 1993. Atkins is on the board of directors of Wynn Resorts and Volvo Car Corporation. She was chairman of the SAP AG advisory board and a member of the ZocDoc advisory board. She was a member of the NASDAQ LLC Exchange board of directors, and is a member of Florida International University's Health Care Network board of directors. She is a member of the Council on Foreign Relations. Atkins has appeared on CNBC, Bloomberg, and Yahoo Finance as a corporate governance commentator.

== Early life and education ==
Atkins was born in the suburbs of Boston. She attended the University of Massachusetts Amherst, receiving a bachelor's degree in liberal arts, magna cum laude, Phi Beta Kappa.

== Career ==
Atkins started her career in the industrial automation and semiconductor industry at General Electric.

Atkins co-founded Interlan, an Ethernet network controller card systems company. The company was acquired by Micom Systems in 1985. In 1988, Atkins became the CEO of Key Computer Labs, selling the company to Amdahl Corporation.

In 1989, she co-founded Ascend Communications and served as a board member and Global CRO and EVP marketing and services. Ascend was acquired by Lucent in 1999. Atkins joined the Lucent board in 2000.

She became the CEO of NCI, Inc., a nutraceutical functional food company, building the company until it was acquired by Artal Luxembourg in 1993.

Atkins has also worked in corporate governance, as an expert witness on the Adelphia bankruptcy case in 2003, and as chairman of the special litigation committee at HealthSouth Corporation.

=== Board work ===
Atkins has been on more than 27 public boards and various private boards and a number of private equity and venture-backed boards in various industries. She has been through 13 IPOs and has directorship experiences in America, Canada, France, China, and Sweden. According to a Harvard study, she has been on the second most public boards of any woman.

=== Books ===
Atkins released her first book, Behind Boardroom Doors: Lessons of a Corporate Director, in 2013, which was intended to offer practical advice for those who serve on the boards of global, complex enterprises. In 2017, she released an updated version of the book, which includes new material about cybersecurity and digitization.

In 2019, Atkins published her third book, Be Board Ready: The Secrets To Landing A Board Seat And Being A Great Director.

=== TV appearances ===
Atkins has appeared on CNBC, Bloomberg, and Yahoo Finance as a corporate governance expert commentator.

She has commentated on the role of the CBS board and its special committee review of Les Moonves.

=== Other work ===
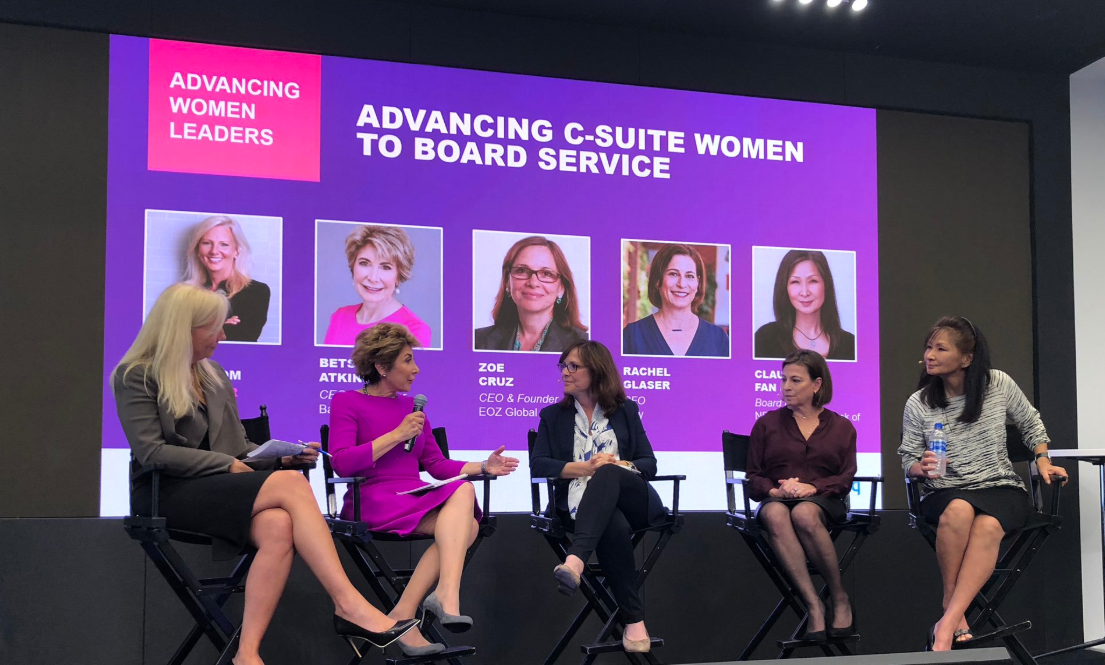
Atkins speaking at the Nasdaq: Advancing Women Leaders event in 2018

Atkins is a Forbes contributor focusing on corporate governance and business trends.

She is a proponent of women leadership in corporate settings. In 2018, she hosted a Women in Leadership luncheon at Volvo HQ in Sweden.

Atkins joined the Wynn Resorts board of directors in 2018, and participated in the inaugural launch event of the Wynn Resorts Women's Leadership Forum.

== Controversy: Maine beach access ==
In June 2014, Atkins, president of Gables Real Estate, LLC, purchased Cedar Beach Road, required for public access to a private beach on Bailey Island, Maine, and vowed to keep it private.

A nonprofit group was formed to encourage access and after exhausting all avenues, filed a lawsuit for usage. A Maine court granted a prescriptive easement to town residents to access a private road in order to gain beach access after demonstrating nine decades of continuous usage by locals and summer residents.

In July 2016, the Maine Law Court overturned the lower court's decision to grant a prescriptive easement across Cedar Beach Road. As a result, the road is now entirely private, and its use is at the discretion of the owner, Gables Real Estate, LLC. Atkins has indicated that she will decide whether or not to continue to allow public access to the beach on an annual basis. The town has taken measures to preserve beach access for all by deploying beach monitors.
