= Betsy Wieseman =

American art historian and curator (born 1958)

- Born: Marjorie Elizabeth Wieseman; 1958 (age 67–68)
- Education: University of Delaware (BA, MA); Columbia University (PhD)
- Occupations: Curator; art historian
- Known for: Scholarship on seventeenth-century Dutch and Flemish painting

Betsy Wieseman (born 1958) is an American art historian and curator whose work focuses on early modern Northern European painting, especially seventeenth-century Dutch and Flemish art.

From 2019 to 2025, she served as Curator and Head of the Department of Northern European Paintings at the National Gallery of Art in Washington, D.C.

Her scholarship centers on seventeenth-century Netherlandish art, with particular emphasis on Dutch portraiture, genre painting, Peter Paul Rubens, portrait miniatures, technical art history, and the history of art collecting.

Before joining the National Gallery of Art, she held curatorial posts at the Cleveland Museum of Art, the National Gallery, London, the Museum of Fine Arts, Boston, the Allen Memorial Art Museum at Oberlin College, and the Cincinnati Art Museum.

== Education ==
She studied at the University of Delaware and received her PhD in art history from the University of Maryland, writing it on the life and work of the painter Caspar Netscher.

== Career ==
=== Museum of Fine Arts, Boston ===
Wieseman began her museum career as a research assistant at the Museum of Fine Arts, Boston, where she worked on exhibitions devoted to Dutch landscape painting and seventeenth-century Flemish painting. She contributed to the catalogue for The Age of Rubens, held at the Museum of Fine Arts, Boston and the Toledo Museum of Art in 1993–1994.

=== Allen Memorial Art Museum ===
Wieseman later worked at the Allen Memorial Art Museum at Oberlin College as Curator of Western Art before 1850. Her projects there included exhibitions on seventeenth-century Dutch painting, American landscapes, German Expressionist paintings, and portrait miniatures.

=== Cincinnati Art Museum ===
Wieseman served as Curator of European Painting and Sculpture at the Cincinnati Art Museum. Her exhibitions there included A Brush with Nature: The Gere Collection of Landscape Oil Sketches in 2003, Drawn by the Brush: Oil Sketches by Peter Paul Rubens in 2004, and Perfect Likeness: European and American Portrait Miniatures from the Cincinnati Art Museum in 2006.

=== National Gallery, London ===
In 2006, Wieseman joined the National Gallery, London as Curator of Dutch Paintings 1600–1800. In 2012, her work expanded to include Flemish paintings of the seventeenth and eighteenth centuries. Her exhibitions in London included Dutch Portraits: The Age of Rembrandt and Frans Hals in 2007, Close Examinations: Fakes, Mistakes and Discoveries in 2010, Vermeer and Music: The Art of Love and Leisure in 2013, Rembrandt: The Late Works in 2014–2015, and Dutch Flowers in 2016.

Wieseman curated Vermeer's Women: Secrets and Silence at the Fitzwilliam Museum in Cambridge in 2011–2012. The exhibition drew record attendance for the museum, with The Guardian reporting 117,000 visitors by January 2012.

In 2013, she curated Vermeer and Music: The Art of Love and Leisure, an exhibition on music in seventeenth-century Dutch painting.

Rembrandt: The Late Works, organized by the National Gallery, London with the Rijksmuseum, examined paintings, drawings, and prints from the final phase of Rembrandt's career. It received coverage in the BBC, The Guardian, and The New York Times.

In 2016, Wieseman curated Dutch Flowers at the National Gallery, London.

=== Cleveland Museum of Art ===
In 2017, Wieseman joined the Cleveland Museum of Art as the Paul J. and Edith Ingalls Vignos Jr. Curator of European Paintings and Sculpture, 1500–1800. She later served as chair of European art from classical antiquity to 1800 and curator of European paintings and sculpture 1500–1800.

At Cleveland, Wieseman co-curated Renaissance Splendor: Catherine de’ Medici’s Valois Tapestries, an exhibition organized with the Gallerie degli Uffizi. She also reinstalled three Northern European galleries at the museum.

=== National Gallery of Art ===
In 2019, Wieseman was appointed Curator and Head of the Department of Northern European Paintings at the National Gallery of Art in Washington, D.C., a newly created position combining the museum's former Northern Baroque and Northern Renaissance painting curatorships. She retired from the post in 2025.

At the National Gallery of Art, Wieseman worked on Vermeer’s Secrets in 2022 and curated Clouds, Ice, and Bounty: The Lee and Juliet Folger Fund Collection of Seventeenth-Century Dutch and Flemish Paintings. During her tenure, the department also mounted Little Beasts: Art, Wonder, and the Natural World.

In 2025, she curated Thuis bij Ter Borch: Kunstenaarsfamilie in Zwolle at Museum de Fundatie in Zwolle.

== Exhibitions curated ==
Her research often explores the technical and emotional depth of Northern European paintings, bringing new insights to understanding of art produced during the Dutch Golden Age. Through her curatorial work, Wieseman has contributed extensively to academic publications and exhibition catalogs:

- Thuis bij Ter Borch (September 6, 2025 – February 1, 2026), Museum de Fundatie in Zwolle.
- The Tudors: Art and Majesty in Renaissance England (February 26, 2023 – May 14, 2023), National Gallery of Art.
- Vermeer's Secrets (October 8, 2022 – January 8, 2023), National Gallery of Art.
- Clouds, Ice, and Bounty: The Lee and Juliet Folger Fund Collection of Seventeenth-Century Dutch and Flemish Paintings (October 17, 2021 – February 27, 2022), National Gallery of Art.
- Renaissance Splendor: Catherine de’ Medici’s Valois Tapestries (November 18, 2018 – January 21, 2019), Cleveland Museum of Art.
- Dutch Flowers (April 6, 2016 – August 26, 2016), The National Gallery.
- Late Rembrandt (February 12, 2015 – May 17, 2015), National Gallery.
- Rembrandt: The Late Works (October 15, 2014 – January 18, 2015), The National Gallery.
- Vermeer and Music: The Art of Love and Leisure (June 26, 2013 – September 8, 2013), The National Gallery.
- Vermeer’s Women: Secrets and Silence (October 5, 2011 – January 15, 2012), Fitzwilliam Museum.

== Conferences and symposia ==
- America and the Art of Flanders: Collecting Paintings by Rubens, Van Dyck, and Their Circles (May 13-14, 2016), Frick Collection.
- Godefridus Schalcken – Fascination and Impact (January 21-23, 2016), Wallraf-Richartz-Museum & Fondation Corboud.
- Johannes Vermeer. On Reflection (November 9, 2021).
