= Betsy Holden =

American businesswoman

Betsy DeHaas Holden (born October 19, 1955) is an American businesswoman and corporate director of the Tribune Company. Holden is a senior advisor to McKinsey & Company and a member of the Duke University board of trustees.

From 2001 to 2004, Holden served as co-CEO of Kraft Foods.

== Early life ==
Holden was born in Lubbock, Texas, and raised in Washington, Pennsylvania. Her father was an obstetrician and her mother was a former accountant.

Holden received her B.A. from Duke University in 1977, and an M.Ed. and an MBA from Northwestern University in 1978 & 1982.

== Career ==
Holden began her career as an assistant product manager in the desserts division of General Foods Corporation. In 1998, Holden was named executive vice president of Kraft Foods. In 2000, she was named president and CEO of Kraft Foods North America, and then in 2001 became co-CEO of Kraft Foods. In 2004, Holden was named president of Global Marketing and Category Development. She resigned from Kraft Foods Inc in 2005.
