= Betsy Whyte =

Scottish Traveller, tradition-bearer, folksinger, and storyteller (1919–1988)

Betsy Whyte, née Townsley (1919–1988), was a Scottish Traveller. She was an accomplished singer and a noted virtuoso of traditional Scottish storytelling. Recordings of her performances are held in the permanent collection of the School of Scottish Studies, part of the University of Edinburgh. She wrote her autobiography in two parts: Yellow on the Broom, published in 1979, and its sequel, Red Rowans and Wild Honey, published posthumously in 1990. The Yellow on the Broom was the first memoir published by a Scottish Traveller.

== Life ==
Whyte was born in 1919 in Old Rattray, a suburb of Blairgowrie to Alexander (Sandy) Whyte and Margaret (Maggie) Townsley. She was awarded a scholarship to Brechin High School, where she was the only Traveller pupil.

She married Bryce Whyte, another Traveller, in 1939. Bryce served with the Seaforth Highlanders during the war, but he was invalided out of the army in 1943. The couple moved to the fishing village of Usan, near Montrose. They later moved to Ferryden, and then into central Montrose.

Whyte was recorded by several different folklorists from the School of Scottish Studies between 1973 and 1988, including Linda Williamson. She and other traditional storytellers frequently visited the School of Scottish Studies. The School holds 331 separate recordings of Betsy Whyte performing songs, traditional tales, stories of the supernatural, and riddles, and recounting customs and beliefs, traveller cant, and biography.

The Muckle Sangs LP (1975) included two of her performances of ballads, The Twa Sisters (Child 10) and Young Johnstone (Child 88).

== Significance ==
The Scots Magazine called Whyte's autobiography, Yellow on the Broom, "a minor classic".

Her significance as a storyteller was that she was a traditional storyteller from the Traveller community rather than a member of the revival movement. She was also largely an oral storyteller, able to retain and construct the story in her head before writing it down. She was the only recorded source on the Scottish mainland of a Gaelic story, The Vision of Mac Con Glinne, and had several Gaelic stories in her repertoire.

She was also significant as a singer of Scottish ballads by virtue of her personal connection to them; she was related to the Johnstone family of Young Johnstone (Child 88), which she performed in 1974.

Recordings of her performances are held in the permanent collection of the School of Scottish Studies, part of the University of Edinburgh.

== Books ==
- Whyte, Betsy (1979). The Yellow on the Broom: The Early Days of a Traveller Woman. Edinburgh: W. and R. Chambers.
- Whyte, Betsy (1990). Red Rowans and Wild Honey. Edinburgh: Canongate.)

== Recordings ==
- The Story of the Laird of the Black Arts
- The Story of the Two Brothers

The School of Scottish Studies made 331 recordings of Betsy Whyte.

== In popular culture ==
The song Yellow on the Broom, by Adam McNaughtan, on his album Words, Words, Words (1983), is based on the book. The song was also performed by Cilla Fisher and Artie Trezise on their album Reaching Out (1986); Sheena Wellington on her album Clearsong (1990); Jean Redpath on her album Summer of my Dreams (2000); Gordon Easton on his album The Last of the Clydesdales (2007); and by Claire Hastings and Robyn Stapleton on their 2015 tour.

The 1989 play Yellow on the Broom, by Ann Downie, was based on the book, and was performed in 2018 at the Dundee Rep Theatre.

Betsy Whyte's great-grandson, David Pullar, has produced a children's book about her life, entitled Wee Bessie. It is based on her book, Yellow on the Broom.
