= Betsy Schneider =

American photographer

- Occupation: Photographer

Academic background
- Education: University of Michigan; School of the Art Institute of Chicago

Betsy Schneider is an American photographer who lives and works in the Boston Area.

== Biography ==
After her graduation from the University of Michigan in 1987, she studied and received a second bachelor's degree in film and photography at the School of the Art Institute of Chicago 1990, from 1993 to 1995, she worked as an assistant to photographer Sally Mann she earned an MFA from Mills College in 1997. In 1997 she moved to London with Electro-acoustic composer Frank Ekeberg where their daughter Madeleine was born. During that time her work was exhibited frequently in the UK and Scandinavia.

In 2001, they moved to Norway where her son Viktor was born, and in 2002 the family moved to Tempe, Arizona, accepting a position on the faculty in the School of Art at Arizona State University. In addition to being an artist Schneider is an educator and has taught in several programs in addition to Arizona State among them Massachusetts College of Art and Design, Harvard University, Hampshire College, Wellesley College and Emerson College.

In 2011 Schneider received a Guggenheim Fellowship. and over the next four years completed To Be Thirteen, a project consisting of videos and view camera portraits of 250 Thirteen-Year olds from around the US. The work is a traveling exhibition that originated at the Phoenix Art Museum in 2018, a book published by Radius Books and includes an essay by Rebecca Senf, Chief Curator at the Center for Creative Photography in Tucson, as well as a 55 minute film, Triskaidekaphobia. In 2021 she received a Seed Grant from the Global Sport Institute at Arizona State to collect stories and make portraits of 50 female-identified athletes who played on otherwise all male sports teams.

In 2004, her photography caused some controversy in the UK when the police received complaints about nude photographs of her daughter, on display in Spitz Gallery in a group exhibition, "Inventories", an exhibition of four artists whose work addressed family photography. The images were part of a series of pictures from a body of work entitled Quotidian and consisted of three 63-day blocks of daily images of her daughter from birth to nine weeks, two years and five years old. The artist herself was somewhat taken aback by the reaction to her photos and was quoted in the Guardian as saying:

The aim of these pictures is not to provoke or to shock. The idea is to show time, change and growth.

In 2011 she was awarded a Guggenheim Fellowship.

Schneider is represented by Tilt Gallery in Scottsdale, Arizona.

== Publications ==
- Schneider, Betsy (2017). To be Thirteen. Rebecca A. Senf, Phoenix Art Museum, Santa Fe, NM. ISBN 9781942185260

== Exhibitions ==
- Phoenix Art Museum, "To Be Thirteen: Photographs and Videos by Betsy Schneider," May 4, 2018 – November 11, 2018.
