= Betsy James =

Writer, illustrator

- Born: Missouri

Betsy James is an American writer and illustrator of children's books, books for young adults, and nonfiction. She has been nominated for the World Fantasy Awards and the James Tiptree Jr. Memorial Award.

== Early life and education ==
James was born in Missouri, United States. She went to Mount Holyoke College as well as the University of Utah where she earned a degree in English. James works as a freelance writer and illustrator. She lives in Albuquerque, New Mexico. There she works on her books and teaches.

== Bibliography ==
=== Nonfiction/memoir ===
- Breathing Stone: Living Small in a Southwest Village (2023)

=== Series ===
- What's That Room For? (1988)
- Natalie Underneath (1990)
- Long Night Dance (1989)
- Dark Heart (1992)
- Listening At the Gate (2006)
- Roadsouls (2016)

=== Collections ===
- Sandspurs and Sawgrass (2000)

=== Picture books ===
- The Red Cloak (1989)
- The Dream Stair (1990)
- He Wakes Me (1991)
- Mary Ann (1994)
- The Mud Family (1994)
- Blow Away Soon (1995)
- Flashlight (1997)
- Tadpoles (1999)
- My Chair (2004)
