= Betsy Kaufman =

American visual artist

- Born: 1957 (age 67–68); San Francisco, California, US
- Education: Rhode Island School of Design
- Known for: Abstract painting, works on paper, needlepoint sculpture
- Spouse: Mark Greenwold
- Website: Betsy Kaufman

Betsy Kaufman (born 1957) is a visual artist based in New York known for abstract paintings and works on paper, as well as needlepoint sculptures. Critics distinguish her work by its subversion of modernist systems (e.g. the grid structure, seriality) and its insertion of strong emotion, humor, and narrative into geometric abstraction. Writer Ingrid Schaffner observed that Kaufman's paintings are "inherently based on disruption … She has made the accidents, oppositions, contradictions, and mercurialness, which most organizing impulses work hard to minimize, into the rationale that guides the unpredictable and forceful narrative of her abstractions." Kaufman has exhibited at the Brooklyn Museum, Musée d’art moderne de Saint-Etienne (France), Queens Museum of Art, Staatsgalerie Stuttgart (Germany) and the Tang Museum, among other venues.

== Education and early career ==
Kaufman was born in San Francisco in 1957 and raised in the Bay Area. She attended Hampshire College before earning a BFA from Rhode Island School of Design. In 1980, she moved to New York City, where she is based.

Kaufman's early 1980s paintings combined abstract shapes suggesting land masses on a map and fragments of statuary alluding to the human figure. She placed these elements in a deep space derived from the Renaissance painting practice of structuring perspectival recession through the checkerboard grid patterns of depicted pavements. By the late 1980s, she had gradually flattened and reduced this imagery to the landforms and, by 1990, to spare large abstractions of circles, rectangles, blobs, and blips. Recognizing some of the contradictory qualities that became more pronounced in her later work, Artforum critic Ronnie Cohen wrote that the clarity of these images spoke "directly of order and structure" while simultaneously offering "something wonderfully whimsical" in their compositions.

In her early career, Kaufman appeared in group exhibitions at the Queens Museum of Art, Renaissance Society, Artists Space, and Carnegie Museum of Art, and had solo shows at Wolff Gallery and Julian Pretto/Berland Hall in New York, and the Center for Contemporary Art in Chicago.

Betsy Kaufman, Wavers Landscape, 56" x 78", 2008.

== Abstract paintings and works on paper ==
In 1997, Kaufman began exhibiting at Leslie Tonkonow Artworks + Projects in New York. Through 2022, she has had nine solo shows there. Other featured exhibitions have taken place at Akademie Schloss Solitude in Germany (1996 and 1997) and Kerry Schuss Gallery in New York (2019). She also appeared in group exhibitions at the Brooklyn Museum, Staatsgalerie Stuttgart, Hyde Collection Art Museum, Butler Institute of American Art, Tang Museum and Pace Gallery, among others.

Writers have compared Kaufman's later work to the minimalism of Agnes Martin, but distinguish it for its greater variety and embrace of unpredictability, both within and across individual works. Kaufman employs simple means—geometric shapes, skewed and parallel lines, semi-transparent, solid or brushy bands and grounds—with finely calibrated differences in brightness and hue to achieve states of density, dissolution, and movement. Critics identify her overlaying of different yet exacting configurations and systems as a characteristic strategy that introduces slippage (or non-alignment) into the work and wreaks havoc with order and symmetry.

In the mid-1990s—and extending into the latter 2000s—Kaufman revisited the grids of her early work, this time as her primary subject, deploying them less as a means to regularity or seriality than as a vehicle for disruption and unpredictability. Critic Barry Schwabsky characterized these paintings as "contrapuntally active, even a bit jumpy, rather than contemplative," noting that each achieved a "complete particularity" derived from unexpected syncopations between them. Describing the work as "the softest hard-edge paintings you could possibly imagine" in one essay, he has noted the varied effects Kaufman attains with contiguous color blocks, ranging from stained-glass transparency to staccato movement (Rose Garden, 1993) to spatial illusionism suggesting blown-up, digitized photography (Sugar Street, 1994).

In reviews of shows at Leslie Tonkonow, critic Jed Perl wrote that Kaufman brought "new energy to old games" through a mischievous use of regular patterns to produce irregular effects, while The New York Times's Ken Johnson described paintings such as Wavers and Blue Text (2000) as "unpredictably various" and "at once mathematical and poetic." Perl highlighted Insulate (1997) as "an engaging conversation" between seventeen horizontal, end-to-end white lines and a series of brilliantly colored, jostling vertical units below, all set upon a rosy terracotta ground.

Kaufman's later exhibitions often centered on modestly sized works. In a 2011 three-person show (with Robert Watts and Lawrence Weiner), she presented a series of small, minimal yet expressive, roughly square images of overlapping polygons, hazy parallelograms and portal-like shapes that were likened to forms in the act of solidifying or turning into gas. A 2014 exhibition juxtaposed small pieces with a central, 39-panel work of various red and pink squarish shapes that resembled architectural elements, arranged on ~~a~~ gray wall (A Story of Red, 2013). John Yau wrote that looking at the four large acrylic paintings and 20 small works on paper in Kaufman's 2016 show was "an act of meditation, of sensitivity to difference and placement" that evoked the "computer screens and the floating ambience of the digital world—a feeling of being both rooted and uprooted." The two-person show of small-scale works, "Through Thick & Thin" (Kerry Schuss Gallery, 2019), paired and contrasted Kaufman's subtle, precise, and thinly painted works on paper with the thick, brightly hued ceramics of Polly Apfelbaum.

Betsy Kaufman, BLYP (diptych), wool on needlepoint canvas, velvet, stuffing, 25" x 13" x 10", 2020–21.

== Sculpture ==
In 2018, Kaufman expanded her interest in form and color to include volume, creating needlepoint sculptures referencing pillows as a humorous device; she also produced one-inch-thick works she termed "drawings in needlepoint." She exhibited this work in "14 Sculptures, 1 Painting" (Leslie Tonkonow, 2022), displaying the sculptures on pedestals and platforms. Hyperallergic writer Ela Bittencourt contended that the sculptures "coaxed humor and joy" out of analytical styles such as constructivism and likened them to work by Sophie Taeuber-Arp and Eva Hesse that undermined modernist sculptural hierarchies such as the privileging of fine over applied arts or hard, rigid form over soft. She wrote that the "domestic" works pushed "the grid’s implausible pliability until it gives, causing 'slippage' or sag ... corners bend, squares bulge out of their frames, asymmetries get thrown off by bits of plushy excess." This body of work was also exhibited at Pace Gallery and Hunter Dunbar Projects in New York in 2022.

== Recognition ==
Kaufman's work belongs to the public collections of the Eli Broad Family Foundation, Sheldon Museum of Art, Staatsgalerie Stuttgart, and the West Collection at SEI, among others, as well as to private and corporate collections. In 1995, she received a fellowship residency from Akademie Schloss Solitude in Germany.
