= Technical art history =

Technical art history is an interdisciplinary field of study at the cross-section of science and humanities in which an increasingly wide range of analytical tools is employed to shed light on the creative process from idea to artwork. Researchers from varying fields – among which art history, conservation, and conservation science – collaborate in an interdisciplinary manner to gain “a thorough understanding of the physical object in terms of original intention, choice of materials and techniques as well as the context in and for which the work was created, its meaning and contemporary perception.”

The scientific analysis of art was initially simply referred to as “technical studies”, a term that was used in early publications by the Straus Center for Conservation and Technical Studies at the Harvard Art Museums in the 1930s. These technical studies entered the discipline art history in the first half of the twentieth century. Since then, the field has evolved rapidly from an auxiliary science into an independent scholarly field and there have been regular attempts to define its scope and aim in published texts. As the field and its name are still rather young, the definitions and objectives that are presented may vary from scholar to scholar. It is clear that with the emancipation of the field, it has exceeded the collaboration of just art historians, conservators and conservation scientists. A broad definition is therefore required to include methodologies from various fields such as anthropology, philology, history of science, and material culture. In a recent report commissioned by the Samuel H. Kress Foundation, Erma Hermens summarised a widely shared view emerging from interviews with experts:

Technical Art History places the object itself at the forefront of investigation as the primary source of information. It addresses the ‘when, why, who, what, where and how’ questions of Art History, by prioritising the understanding and contextualising of an object’s making and material composition. Technical Art History employs a holistic, multifaceted and interdisciplinary research approach to construct object biographies and itineraries, offering comprehensive answers to these questions.

Earlier attempts to define the field include David Bomford’s description in Looking through Paintings (1998) of Technical Art History as an “inclusive evocation of the making of art and the means by which we throw light on that process”, and Maryan Ainsworth’s characterisation of it as the “connoisseurship of the twenty-first century” (Getty Newsletter, 2005).

Two main pathways are followed to explore the physical reality of a work of art: an experimental approach, and the research of documentary sources. The experimental approach includes the direct analysis of works of art and artisanal materials by technical means. Documentary sources include books of secrets and other contemporary writings that deal with artists’ techniques and materials. These sources are vital to the interpretation of the experimental data. It is the combination of these two pathways that calls for the broad range of methodologies and interdisciplinarity of research in the field of technical art history.

== History and development ==
In the early twentieth century the first laboratories focusing on applying scientific techniques on artworks were established around the world. In 1888, the Rathgen-Forschungslabor was founded in Berlin as the first museum laboratory in the world, and in 1928, Edward Forbes established the first conservation research centre in the United States at the Fogg Art Museum at Harvard University (now the Straus Centre for Conservation and Technical Studies). Rutherford John Gettens at the Fogg was the first scientist, world-wide, employed to study fine art. The establishment of these and other similar institutes was imperative to the development of a new approach of studying materials and techniques, and to the shift of conservation from a craft to a science-based practice.

In the decades preceding the inclusion of scientific techniques in the realm of art, the production process of the artwork was of lesser importance to the understanding of an object. Instead, artworks were considered strictly as expressions of human genius and intuition. Consequently, material and technique were considered merely necessary accessories to this process, not influencing the artist's creative decisions. This point of view is part of a broader hierarchical dichotomy within art history between the mind and the hand, or the intellectual and material side of works of art. The research that was conducted in these institutes, and the development of new analytical techniques such as X-radiography and infrared reflectography did not only support more scientifically oriented conservation practices, but also allowed art historians to (re-)gain an understanding of the artist's way of working.

Coinciding with the development of new scientific techniques was the emergence of the so-called ‘new’ art histories (such as feminist art history) in the mid-1970s. These new discourses in art history focused on the relevance of art to social constructs, ignoring traditional approaches and terms like “connoisseurship”, “quality”, “style”, and “genius”. Interestingly, technical art history is not a part of the ‘new’ art histories, even though the establishment of the field was in full progress during this time. Whereas the new art histories in fact move further away from the actual object, by placing it in its social context, technical art history moves further towards the objects, and uses new methods to investigate more traditional targets such as style, provenance, and authenticity. Instead, technical art history could be seen as a part of the material turn, or new materialism, within art history.

The 1996 Grove Dictionary of Art (nowadays Grove Art Online) was lacking the term “technical art history” even though technical examinations had been a part of the artworld for several decades already. The absence of the term could be explained by the fact that it was only first coined at a conference in 1992 by David Bomford, and first published in text in 1996. Even though technical analyses, and examination of artistic techniques had existed for decades, it is in this last quarter of the twentieth century that the truly collaborative, and most importantly interpretive, interdisciplinary study of technical art history established itself. Technical art history as it is known in the 21st century goes beyond what scientific techniques can shed light on, by relying on methodologies from other fields to interpret the experimental scientific data. Whereas the latest developments in sciences will extend the reach of art historians, art history will challenge the sciences for the development and improvement of diagnostic tools or theories.

== Methodologies and aim ==
Technical art historical research often takes one of two pathways: an experimental scientific approach towards materials and techniques, and research into documentary sources on techniques and materials. These two pathways were first set out in 1972 by Joyce Plesters, one of the early pioneers of technical art history, and they still remain as the principal methods by which research attempt to approach the physical reality of artworks.

=== Experimental approach ===
The rapid development of scientific analytical applications has provided unique insight into the material composition of works of art and their subsequent deterioration process. Often used techniques for the analysis of artworks include multispectral imaging, X-radiography, scanning macro-XRF, neutron activation autoradiography, dendrochronology and gas chromatography-mass spectrometry (GC-MS). An overview of the continuously growing list of commonly used techniques is presented in the Handbook of Scientific Techniques for the Examination of Works of Art.

The data gained from these analytical techniques is crucial for understanding the present condition of an artwork, including its material history and the changes it has undergone.

=== Documentary sources ===
To accurately interpret and understand the data from scientific techniques, a thorough understanding of the artist's working process is required. Multidisciplinary research into documentary sources on artist's techniques and materials brings researchers closer to the original voice of the artist as it is found in diaries, treatises, correspondence, and other (near˗)contemporary writings. Methodologies from various disciplines such as philology and history of science are incorporated to provide insight into the context in which the artists worked with certain materials, and the mentality towards techniques that were used to manipulate these materials.

A commonly used method to research documentary sources is the reconstruction of historic artisanal recipes. These reconstructions shed light on artist's workshop practices and the process of making in the workshop.

=== Aim ===
As the field is so interdisciplinary, identifying one single aim is a futile endeavour that would undoubtedly neglect the many different research possibilities that technical art history offers. Through collaborative interpretation, the multidisciplinary data can shed light on a broad range of subjects such as the material history of artworks, the artist's working process, and their use of specific materials. Knowledge of the physical and material aspect of artworks can assist in the authentication of artworks, and as such the field has also been described as a modern connoisseurship. The Rembrandt Research Project is an example of a well-known large research initiative that employed methodologies from technical art history to analyse and authenticate works by Rembrandt.

Although a large part of the research within technical art history is focused on these material aspects, many new types of research have developed within the field that try to achieve a broader view of the process of making that includes historic techniques, workshop practices, the context in which artists worked, and the transmission of tacit knowledge through manuscripts. Two examples of research initiatives that investigate the process of converting (tacit) craft knowledge into (scientific) written knowledge are the Making and Knowing project (Columbia University), and the ARTECHNE project (Utrecht University and University of Amsterdam). Instead of focusing on an artwork as the primary object, these projects focus on written documents, to improve understanding on how techniques in the arts were transmitted among artists and craftsmen.

New insight into the material histories of artworks, from its moment of creation until its current condition in the 21st century, will encourage to look at works of art with fresh eyes and might lead to new insights in art history. Subsequently, every new observation on a work of art – in material or methodological terms – will spark new experimental and documentary research for confirmation. Finally, being re-engaged with artists “and all their processes and ambitions for making art” brings us back closer to the hand of the artist, allowing us to critically reflect on our interpretation of their works.

== Educational programmes ==
Technical art history was one the emerging ‘new’ art histories in the 1970s and 1980s. Nowadays, several universities around the world offer training and research programmes based on technical art history.

- New York University
- Stockholm University
- Courtauld Institute of Art
- University of Amsterdam
- University of Delaware
- University of Glasgow
- Yale University
- West Virginia University

== See also ==
- Art history
- Archaeological science
- Conservation and restoration of cultural heritage
- Conservation science (cultural heritage)
- Conservation scientist
- New materialism (in art history)
- Rembrandt Research Project
