= Betsy Harrison Gagne =

American botanist (1947–2020)

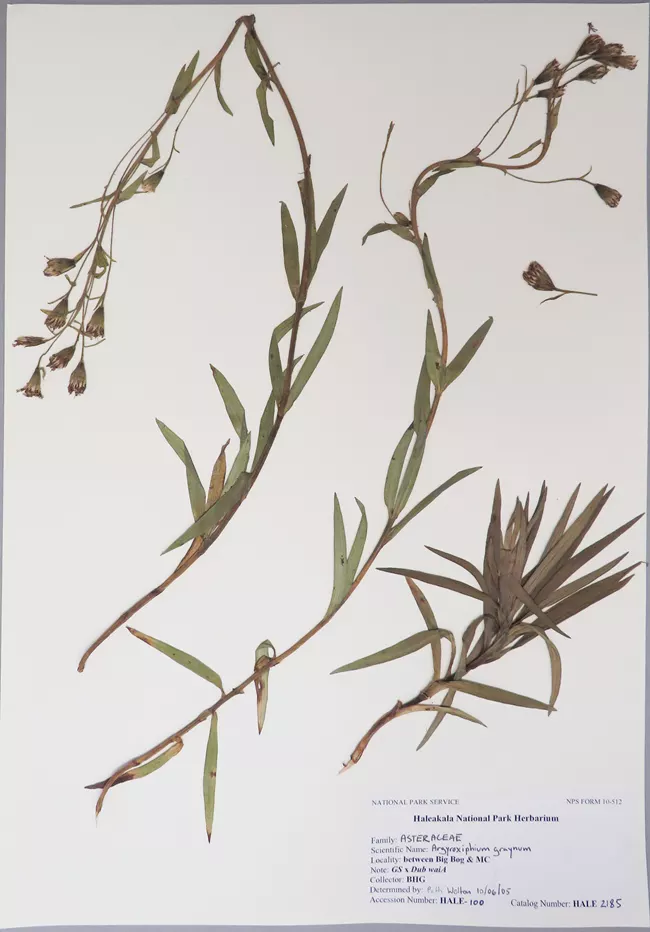

Betsy Clarke Harrison Gagne (or Gagné; 29 November 1947, Honolulu, Hawai‘i – 27 March 2020, Honolulu, Hawai‘i) was a botanist, conservation biologist and environmental activist.

== Early life ==
Betsy Clarke Harrison was born in November 1947 and raised on the island of Oahu, where she dedicated much of her career to conservation biology. While a student at Roosevelt High School in Honolulu, Gagne was employed at Bishop Museum as a curatorial assistant under Yoshio Kondo. Motivated by her appreciation for the unique native flora and fauna, she followed her mother's example by becoming an environmental activist. In 1970, she and her mother, Elizabeth Harrison, were whistle blowers in a campaign to bring attention to illegal Koa tree (Acacia koa) logging operations near the Hāmākua coast on Hawai'i Island.

== Higher education and early career ==
In 1973, she graduated with a degree in botany from the University of Hawai'i at Mānoa and was soon after hired to work on the island of Maui as a member of the Hāna Rain Forest Project field team. Her main role was to establish research camps in remote areas in Waiho'i Valley. According to her colleagues, she had the ability and knowledge to lead research teams into the deepest sections of Maui's cloud covered forests and could work in any condition. During her work with the Hāna Rain Forest Project, she gained an extensive amount of experience and knowledge regarding the natural ecology of Hawai'i.

It was during these years that she met her future husband Wayne Charles Gagné (died May 24, 1988), a Canadian entomologist originally from Quebec, with whom she worked closely on several expeditions. They formed a close relationship that later led to their marriage. During their marriage they made several significant contributions to the field of conservation biology.

== Contributions ==
She worked with her husband in Papua New Guinea from April 1976 to 1979 where they developed several conservation initiatives and programs at the Wau Ecology Institute. During her first year in Papua New Guinea she taught at Bulolo Forestry College and helped develop an educational conservation program. She also assisted in the conception of the Composted Contour-mound Agro-Silviculture Project which aimed to create protocol for sustainable agricultural systems to prevent future destruction of primary forests due to slash and burn methods. The demonstration garden that they built was later recognized by the United Nations University which led to additional support for the program and the eventual integration of the methods into government supported operations.

In 1976, Gagne served on several field expeditions and surveys in the highlands of Papua New Guinea where she assisted scientists, such as botanist Pieter van Royen, in the study of alpine flora within the region. In 1980, she created a poster of the major plant groups of alpine New Guinea as requested by the Papua New Guinea Department of Environment and Conservation and functioned as a research liaison officer for the Wau Ecology Institute's visiting researchers. She later assembled a collection of ethnologically significant cultural items from Papua New Guinea which is still displayed at Bishop Museum.

In the 1980s, Gagne returned to Hawai‘i and focused her efforts on local conservation projects by joining the Resource Management field crew that was responsible for building the fence around the Haleakala National Park habitat enclosure on Maui. Hawai'i has suffered many major extinction events due in large part to the introduction and naturalization of invasive species within native forest ecosystems. Fenced areas were installed in order to protect vulnerable habitats known to have high amounts of biodiversity from invasive grazing mammals and pests.

In 1991, Miconia calvescens, a noxious weed that had previously infiltrated forests of Tahiti, was first sighted by Gagne in Hāna, Maui. Because she was familiar with the damage that the invasive weed can inflict on endemic ecosystems, Gagne and her colleague Steven Montgomery launched a fifteen-year long campaign to add the plant to the official Hawaii Noxious Weed List. Gagne and Montgomery's lobbying paid off in 1992 by getting Miconia calvescens added to the List, which then led to the formation of a Melastome Action Committee, now referred to as the Invasive Species Committee. This committee allowed for an organized response between conservation organizations state wide. The Invasive Species Committee is responsible for large scale conservation efforts that take place throughout the main Hawaiian Islands today. In later years, Gagne and colleagues Lorrin Gill and Dana Peterson lobbied for the revival of a biocontrol program for another noxious weed, Clidemia hirta.

Gagne verified the discovery of the Astelia bug in Kīpahulu Valley in 1998, which led to the description of a new genus, Asteliamiris.

== Later years ==
Gagne continued her work and advocacy for conservation efforts throughout the Hawaiian islands until her death in March 2020 from cancer. When a new species of Hawaiian land snail was discovered for the first time in 60 years in 2020, the snail was named Auriculella gagneorum in honor of Gagne's impactful career and lifelong dedication to the endemic biodiversity in Hawaii.

== Select publications ==
- Loope, L. L., Medeiros, A. C., Gagne, B. H. (1991). Aspects of the history and biology of the Montane Bogs. Studies in the Montane Bogs of Haleakalā National Park (76), 1-43.
- Loope, L. L., Medeiros, A. C., Gagne, B. H. (1991). Recovery of vegetation of a Montane Bog following protection from feral pig rooting. Studies in the Montane Bogs of Haleakalā National Park (77), 1–23.
- Loope, L. L., Medeiros, A. C., Gagne, B. H. (1991). Degradation of vegetation in two Montane Bogs: 1982–1988. Studies in the Montane Bogs of Haleakalā National Park (78). 1–31.
- Young, L. C., Vanderwerf, E. A., Smith, D. G., Polhemus, J., Swenson, N. Swenson, C., Liesemeyer, B. R., Gagne, B. H., Conant, S., (2009). Demography and natural history of Laysan Albatross on Oahu, Hawaii. The Wilson Journal of Ornithology, 121(4), pp. 722–729.
- Haworth, F. G. & Gagne, B. H. (2012) Development of insect conservation in Hawaii. Insect Conservation: Past, Present and Prospects, pp. 359–376.
