= Betsy Freese =

American editor, blogger, and radio personality

- Education: Iowa State University (BS)
- Occupations: Editor, blogger, radio personality
- Employer: Meredith Corporation

Betsy Freese is an American editor, blogger, and radio personality who focuses on small and large-scale agriculture journalism as executive editor for Successful Farming and Living the Country Life. She was the host of both the Living the Country Life radio series and TV show. She produces the exclusive annual Pork Powerhouses ranking of the largest 25 pork producers in the U.S. and Canada.

== Early life ==
Betsy Freese was raised in Maryland, one of three children. She was exposed to agriculture from a young age through her father, Phil Johnson, who raised pigs and grew corn. In 1975, her father purchased a turkey farm from his father, Warren Johnson. The farm was originally used to grow turkeys, and provided one of the first turkeys for the White House Thanksgiving under president Harry S. Truman. Freese's father converted the farm to raise confinement hogs and grow strawberries.

== Education ==
Freese attended Iowa State University, majoring in agricultural journalism. There she met her future husband, Robert Freese, who was a major in animal science. She served as Issue Editor for the Iowa State University Yearbook, writing stories on agriculture and politics. She graduated in 1984 with a degree in agricultural journalism.

== Career ==
Freese began her career at Meredith Corporation, working for the farming focused magazine Successful Farming. There she started her annual exclusive article Pork Powerhouses, which ranks the largest 25 pork producers in the U.S. and Canada.

In the early 2000s, Betsy began working on a new project under Meredith Corporation aimed at small farms and acreages. Freese recognized that agricultural journalists needed to expand past just using print media into new forms such as the internet. This culminated in Living the Country Life, which would consist of a quarterly magazine, internet presence via blogging, radio and television show. The Living the Country Life magazine was first released in 2002 and is produced quarterly.

Launched in 2004, the Living the Country Life television show aired on RFD-TV, running for a total of 5 seasons. Freese was chosen to host the TV program because of her passion for country living as well as believability on the topic of running a small farm. Betsy hosted the first four seasons of the show, while a fifth was hosted separately.

The Living the Country Life radio show launched in 2007, and continues to air on 307 stations reaching 1.9 million listeners. The show is hosted by Freese and Jodi Henke and features stories and advice on small farms and acreages.

== Honors ==
- 1993 - Master Writer, American Agricultural Editors’ Association
- 1994 - Oscar in Agriculture
- 2003 - Award for Best Team Story, American Agricultural Editors' Association
- 2005 - Writer of Merit, American Agricultural Editors’ Association
- 2009 - Bill Zipf Presidential Award, North American Agricultural Journalists
- 2015 - President's Award, American Agricultural Editors’ Association
- 2016 - Fellow, American Agricultural Editors’ Association
