= Betsy Thom =

British sociologist

- Born: Elizabeth Whyte Thom
- Education: London School of Hygiene & Tropical Medicine (PhD)
- Scientific career
- Fields: Sociology
- Institutions: Middlesex University
- Thesis: Alcohol treatment policy 1950-1990: from alcohol treatment to alcohol problems management (1997)
- Doctoral advisor: Virginia Berridge

Betsy Thom is a British sociologist and Professor of Health Policy in the Department of Mental Health & Social Work at Middlesex University She is known for her works on substance abuse and substance use policy. She is the head of the Drug and Alcohol Research Centre at Middlesex University

She has made notable contributions to the literature as an author in the area of drug and alcohol policy; her contributions were recognised by the Society for the Study of Addiction in their Addiction Lives series and in the journal Addiction (journal).

She was Editor-In-Chief at the Taylor & Francis journal Drugs: Education, Prevention and Policy for over 20 years. Professor Thom helped to establish the network International Society of Addiction Journal Editors, a collective of Editors and Editorial Board members working in the Addiction field.

== Books ==
- Butler, S., Elmeland, K., Nicholls, J. and Thom, B. Alcohol, power and public health: A comparative study of alcohol policy, Routledge 2017
- Kolind, T., Thom, B. and Hunt G. Handbook of Drug and Alcohol Studies, SAGE 2016
- Growing up with risk, edited by Betsy Thom, Rosemary Sales and Jenny Pearce, Policy Press 2007
