= Betsy Ettorre =

Anglo-American feminist sociologist

Elizabeth Mary Ettorre (born 28 June 1948) is an Anglo-American feminist sociologist.

== Career ==
Ettorre completed a Bachelor of Arts degree in sociology at Fordham University, New York, before earning a Ph.D. in the subject with a thesis 'The Sociology of lesbianism: female "deviance" and female sexuality' at the London School of Economics and Political Science. She attended the UK's first National Lesbian Conference in Bristol in 1974 and helped to organise the UK's ninth national Women's liberation movement conference in London in 1977. Ettorre did sociological research at Institute of Psychiatry, Birkbeck College and Charing Cross and Westminster Medical School all of the University of London in the 1970s – 1980s; became Professor of Sociology at University of Plymouth and as of 2011 is emeritus professor of sociology, University of Liverpool and Honorary Professor, Aarhus University, Denmark. Since the mid-1990s, Ettorre has been a Docent in Sociology at Åbo Akademi University and University of Helsinki. Aside from lesbianism and feminism, her academic interests include women and substance use, reproduction and genetics and autoethnography.

== Personal life ==
Since 1990, Ettorre has lived in Helsinki, Finland with her wife, Irmeli Laitinen, a Finnish feminist psychotherapist and group analyst.

== Selected publications ==
- Autoethnography as feminist method: sensitizing the feminist ‘I’(London: Routledge, 2017) ISBN 978-1138647886 doi:10.4324/9781315626819.
- (with E. Annandale, V.M. Hildebrand, A. Porroche-Escudero and B. Katz Rothman) Health, Culture & Society: Conceptual legacies and contemporary applications (Basingstoke: Palgrave Macmillan, 2017) doi:10.1007/978-3-319-60786-3.
- (with Nancy Campbell) Gendering addiction: the politics of drug treatment in a neurochemical world (Basingstoke: Palgrave Macmillan, 2017) ISBN 978-0-230-22855-9.
- (2010) “Nuns, dykes, drugs and gendered bodies: An autoethnography of a lesbian feminist’s journey through ‘good time’ sociology”, Sexualities,13, 3: 295–315, doi:10.1177/1363460709363137.
- Revisioning Women and Drug use: Gender, Power and the Body (Basingstoke: Palgrave Macmillan, 2007) ISBN 1-4039-2174-1.
- (Editor) Making Lesbians visible in the Substance Use Field (New York: The Haworth Press, 2005) ISBN 1-56023-616-7.
- (2000) Exploring Lesbian Archetypes or Reviving 'drooping wings' Journal of Lesbian Studies, 4, 1: 127-143 doi:10.1300/J155v04n01_08.
- Reproductive genetics, gender and the body (London, Routledge, 2002) ISBN 0-415-21384-3.
- Women and Alcohol: From a private pleasure to a public problem? (London: Women's Press, 1997) ISBN 0-7043-4437-8.
- (with E. Riska) Gendered Moods: Psychotropics and Society. (London: Routledge, 1995) ISBN 0415082137
- Women and Substance Use (London, Macmillan, 1992) ISBN 0-333-48311-1.
- (1985) 'Compulsory heterosexuality and psycho-trophy' Women's Studies International Forum, 8, 421–428, doi:10.1016/0277-5395(85)90074-3.
- Lesbians, Women and Society (London: Routledge and Kegan Paul, 1980) ISBN 07100-0546-6.
- (1980) 'Sappho revisited: a new look at lesbianism', Women's Studies International Quarterly, 3, 415–442.
- (1978) 'Women, urban social movements and the lesbian ghetto', International Journal of Urban and Regional Research, 2, 499-520 doi:10.1111/j.1468-2427.1978.tb00764.x
- In The Wiley Blackwell Encyclopedia of Social Theory, Ettorre has provided the definition for the word, “lesbianism”. doi:10.1002/9781118430873.est0211
