= Betsy Hart =

American journalist (born c.1963)

Betsy Hart (born c. 1963) was a professional writer for the conservative organization The Heritage Foundation, syndicated columnist for the Scripps Howard News and conservative commentator who is a frequent contributor to CNN and the Fox News Channel. She also appeared frequently on ABC's show Politically Incorrect.

== Works ==
Until 2013, Hart wrote a column on family and cultural issues titled “From the Hart”. The column was distributed each week to hundreds of newspapers all over the country.In 2014 Hart retired from public life to focus on fundraising for The Heritage Foundation, and later as a consultant to conservative pro-family organizations.

== Appearances ==
Hart has also appeared on The Oprah Winfrey Show, where she was featured as one of America’s top five women columnists.

== Family ==
Hart is the mother of four children and author of the book It Takes a Parent: How the Culture of Pushover Parenting is Hurting Our Kids... and What to Do About It (Penguin Putnam 2005).

Hart holds traditional conservative values, and is now active promoting those values in her local community.

== Education ==
In 1985 she graduated from the University of Illinois with a B.A. in Russian Studies.
