= Betsy Wolfston =

American artist

Betsy Wolfston is an American ceramicist whose works include large public installations and smaller high-relief tiles. She is based in Eugene, Oregon.

== Education ==
Wolfston earned a Bachelor of Science degree in 1983 at the University of Oregon. She attended the West African program of the Parsons School of Design, and she was Artist in Residence at the Contemporary Crafts Gallery in Portland, Oregon, in 1991. In 1995 she participated in the Watershed for the Arts in Edgecombe, Maine.

== Critical reception ==
Wolfston's public art project was a topic of discussion during a local Q&A session in Eugene in December 2011. It was asked whether her collaborative work with David Thompson was part of an anti-German conspiracy. The work, Marker of Origin, is a tower/column in front of the train station which includes the word "Welcome" engraved in many languages, except for German. Wolfston responded that the work was more focused on "esoteric" languages such as Gaelic, Kalapooian and Icelandic. The Karen Clarke Gallery described her drawings as "mysterious, impressionistic, vaguely abstract forms, often resembling land or seascape".

== Selected exhibitions ==
- Second Annual Objects of Desire, Passionflower Design (Eugene), February 2011.
- Colorful Historical Stories: an Exploration of the Historical Experiences with Food. In the exhibition series, The Tale of Two Palettes/Palates. David Joyce Gallery at Lane Community College, February 2015.
- Illuminations, Schrager & Clarke Gallery, February - March 2015.

=== Solo exhibitions ===
- [unknown title], Contemporary Crafts Gallery (Portland, Oregon), circa 1992
- Seasons of Origins, Foster/White Gallery (Kirkland, Washington), circa 1995.

== Commissioned public works ==
- The Four Seasons, ceramic and clay tiles and metal (1996), Broadway Plaza, Eugene.
- Moon Tiles, twelve low-relief ceramic tiles (1996), Broadway Plaza, Eugene.
- [unknown title], ceramic tiles (1999), University of Oregon's William W. Knight Law Center Library.
- Our Sun's Family, painted ceramic tile inlaid into concrete (2002), 3401 N. W. Orchard Ave., Corvallis Oregon.
- Marker of Origin, handmade and machined tile with cement, 24 kt gold leaf and steel (2006), train depot parking lot, Eugene. Collaborative work with David Thompson.

== Awards ==
1991 — Artist-in-Residence, Contemporary Crafts Gallery (Portland, Oregon)

2012 — Eugene Arts and Letters award — Wolfston was cited "for her lifetime of work, including public art projects at the Eugene train depot, the University of Oregon law library, the Vivian Olum Child Care Center, FOOD for Lane County, the Hilyard Community Center, the Pearl Street Garage and the Lane Community College Health and Wellness Center".

2014 — Wolfston and artist Kate Ali each received a 3-year $210,000 Oregon Community Foundation grant, "...to create an arts program that enhances the current curriculum as well as providing professional development for teachers". They developed curriculum in drawing and painting, sculpture, 3D art, multimedia arts, graphic design, theater and technology.
