= Betsy Hoza =

American clinical psychologist

- Born: Pittsburgh, Pennsylvania

Academic background
- Education: BA, History, 1981, Princeton University; PhD, Clinical Psychology, 1989, University of Maine
- Thesis: Development and validation of a method for classifying children's social status based on two types of measures: popularity and chumship (1989)

Betsy Hoza is an American clinical psychologist. She is the Bishop Joyce Chair of Human Development Professor of Psychology at the University of Vermont.

== Early life and education ==
Growing up in Pittsburgh, Pennsylvania, Hoza was a top-seeded competitive tennis player who won the 1974 Middle States Girl 16-and-under Hardcourt Tennis Tournament. Standing at over 6 feet, Hoza played on Princeton University's Women's volleyball team under coach Susanna Occhi and on their rowing team. She earned her Bachelor of Arts degree from Princeton in 1981 before enrolling at the University of Maine for her PhD in clinical psychology.

== Career ==
Upon graduating from the University of Maine, Hoza became a specialty counselor and assistant professor of psychiatry at the University of Pittsburgh Medical Center (UPMC), where she had completed her postdoctoral fellowship. In 1995, she left the UPMC to accept an assistant professor position at Purdue University. While at Purdue, Hoza was appointed the faculty supervisor for Purdue's Child and Adolescent Clinic where she studied children with attention deficit hyperactivity disorder (ADHD). In this role, she advocated for parents to try behavior management techniques on youth with ADHD before medication and argued for medicine dosages to be cut in half when paired with behavioral treatment. The following year, she co-published The Development and Validation of the Children’s Hope Scale with Charles R. Snyder which was based on the premise that "children are goal-directed and that their goal-related thoughts can be understood according to two components: agency and pathways." As a result of her research, Hoza was promoted to associate professor of psychological sciences in 1998.

In 2000, Hoza led a study for the National Institute of Mental Health which found that treatment methods for children with ADHD should be patient-specific and not "one size fits all." She reached this conclusion after studying nearly 600 seven to nine-year-old patients with ADHD and randomly assigning them to a treatment program which included; medication management, behavioral treatment, a combination of both, or routine care by their own community practitioners. She was shortly thereafter promoted to Full professor of psychological sciences but left Purdue in 2005 for a similar position at the University of Vermont.

While at the University of Vermont, Hoza co-published ADHD status and degree of positive illusions: moderational and mediational relations with actual behavior in the Journal of Attention Disorders. The aim of their research was to discover if children with behavior problems who exhibit positive illusions were able to improve their behavior in a summer program setting. She followed up this study as the lead investigator of the Does Childhood Positive Self-Perceptual Bias Mediate Adolescent Risky Behavior in Youth from the MTA Study? Hoza believes that children with ADHD often have positive illusions as a management technique because they are often met with failure as a result of their ADHD. As a result of her research, Hoza was appointed a University Scholar in recognition of her "sustained excellence in research and scholarly activities."

In 2014, Hoza was promoted to the Bishop Joyce Chair in Human Development for a four-year renewable term. In this role, she studied the effect exercise had on children with ADHD and designed a highly structured, research-based fitness program called Children and Teachers (CATs) on the Move. Hoza also collaborated with researchers from Michigan State University to research whether exercise before the school day could reduce the symptoms of ADHD in the classroom and at home.

== Selected publications ==
- Academic task persistence of normally achieving ADHD and control boys : performance, self-evaluations, and attributions, 2001
- Self-perceptions of competence in children with ADHD and comparison children, 2004
- What aspects of peer relationships are impaired in children with attention-deficit, 2005
- Using Physical Activity to Manage ADHD Symptoms:The State of the Evidence, 2016
