= Betsy Yanik =

American mathematics educator

Elizabeth Greenwell Yanik
- Born: Catherine Elizabeth Greenwell; Huntington, West Virginia, U.S.
- Other names: Betsy Yanik, C. E. Greenwell-Yanik
- Citizenship: United States
- Education: Bachelor's degree in Mathematics and Physics, Master's degree, Ph.D. in Mathematics
- Alma mater: Marshall University; University of Kentucky
- Occupations: Mathematics educator, Professor
- Employer(s): Emporia State University, Louisiana State University, Virginia Commonwealth University
- Organization(s): Women and Mathematics Education
- Known for: Contributions to mathematics education mentoring women in mathematics
- Title: Roe R. Cross Distinguished Professor (2007); Associate Vice-President for Academic Affairs
- Spouse: Joe Yanik
- Awards: Mary F. Headrick Award (2001); Ruth Schillinger Award (2002); Presidential Award for Excellence in Science, Mathematics, and Engineering Mentoring (2004); Fellow of the Association for Women in Mathematics (2022)

Elizabeth (Betsy) Greenwell Yanik (née Catherine Elizabeth Greenwell; also published as C. E. Greenwell-Yanik) is an American mathematics educator, formerly a professor of mathematics at Emporia State University in Kansas, the 2007 Roe R. Cross Distinguished Professor at Emporia State, and the university's former associate vice-president for academic affairs.

== Education and career ==
Yanik is originally from Huntington, West Virginia. She majored in both mathematics and physics at Marshall University in West Virginia, before doing graduate studies at the University of Kentucky, where she received a master's degree and her doctorate. Her 1982 doctoral dissertation, Finite Element Methods for Partial Integro-Differential Equations, concerned applied mathematics and was supervised by Graeme Fairweather.

She joined Emporia State University in 1990, together with her husband, mathematician Joe Yanik. Before that, she was on the faculty at Louisiana State University and Virginia Commonwealth University.

In 2008, she was listed as the university's associate vice-president for academic affairs. She has served as president of Women and Mathematics Education, an affiliate organization of the National Council of Supervisors of Mathematics.

== Recognition ==
Yanik was the 2001 recipient of the Mary F. Headrick Award and the 2002 recipient of the Ruth Schillinger Award, both of the Emporia State Ethnic and Gender Studies Program, for her activities encouraging women in mathematics both at the university and nationally. She was the university's 2007 Roe R. Cross Distinguished Professor.

In 2004, she was a recipient of a Presidential Award for Excellence in Science, Mathematics, and Engineering Mentoring. She was named as a Fellow of the Association for Women in Mathematics in 2022, "for extraordinary sustained outreach efforts to precollege women and girls, especially underrepresented populations, through conferences and summer programs; for service on AWM’s Executive and Education Committees; and for nearly two decades of organizational leadership, serving as president of Women and Mathematics Education and as director of the Women and Mathematics Network".
