= Lizzie Lloyd King =

American murderer

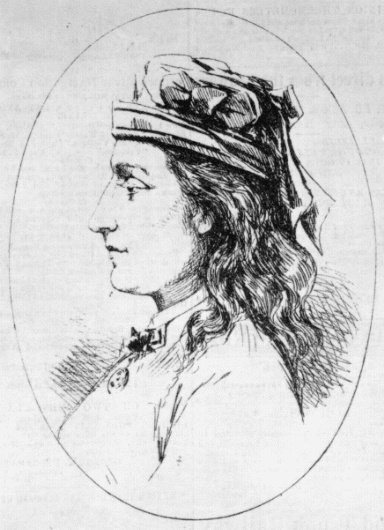
- An 1873 profile of Lizzie Lloyd King from the Canadian Illustrated News
- Born: 1847; Plymouth, Massachusetts, US
- Died: Unknown
- Other names: Elizabeth Lloyd King, Betsy King, Kate Stoddard, Kate Stoddart, Alice Howard, Minnie Waltham, Amy Snow, Amy Stone, Amy Gilmore, Amy G.
- Occupations: milliner, teacher
- Known for: Murder

Elizabeth Lloyd King (born 1847) was the murderer of Charles Goodrich, whom she is said to have shot three times in the head on 20 March 1873 in Brooklyn, New York, United States. The murder was headline news in the city, until her capture more than three months after the event. Her inquest drew large crowds, and prisoner church sermons drew requests for attendance from the general public, some of whom were granted entry. After a year in jail, a psychological assessment deemed that she was unfit to stand trial, and she was committed to a life sentence at the State Lunatic Hospital at Auburn.

Her inquest was held on the same day and at the same court as that for Mary Ann Dwyer, who had murdered her three children, making the story even more sensational for the New York press. The New York Times story headline the next day was "TWO INSANE WOMEN".

The chief of police who handled her case, Patrick Campbell, would recall her case decades later as "a great one", and one of the most memorable of his career.

== Description ==
King was described as a "remarkable woman", who was "attractive in face, manner and figure, and was a fine musician". She was also intelligent:

When she was eighteen, she commenced to go to school again; she studied very hard, graduated at the head of her class of fourteen or fifteen girls.

— The New York Times

== Early life ==
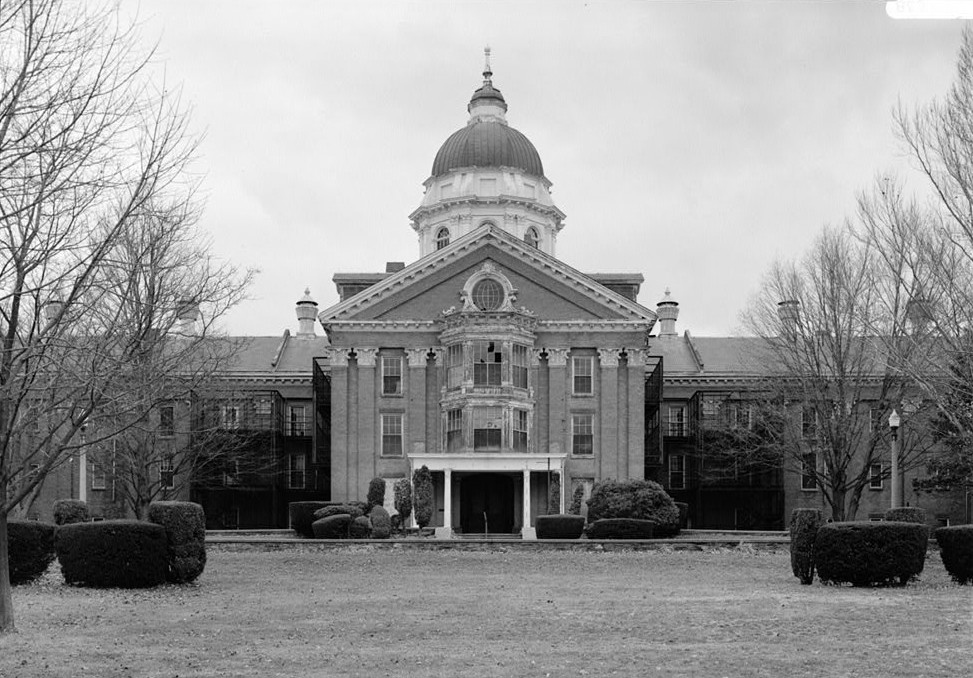
The Taunton Lunatic Asylum, now known as the Taunton State Hospital.

King was born Elizabeth Lloyd King in Plymouth, Massachusetts to Isaac B. King and Harriet A. Hoyt, and had an older sister. She was described to have a normal childhood, for which her mother could not recall King as having "ever said an immodest word". After puberty, "she grew more and more unnatural and strange", and led a troubled youth, leaving and returning to school at her whim. When in school, she did well in her studies.

She left home shortly afterward. On 25 April 1867, a probate court in Boston committed her to the Taunton Lunatic Asylum, during which time she was also known as Alice Howard. Her attending physician was Norton Folsom, who indicated the "form of her disease was mania, which was manifested by excitement, irascibility, incoherence of speech and violent conduct", and that her condition was "caused by some disease peculiar to females". He indicated that by 10 May 1867, she appeared better. She was discharged on 10 September 1867. From then until 1873, she worked as a milliner and teacher in New York City, Philadelphia, and Hartford, not returning to her hometown during this period.

== Relationship with Charles Goodrich ==
In New York City, she roomed with Mary Handley at 45 Elizabeth Street from February 1872, until late June or early July of that year. Handley knew King by the name Kate Stoddard, an alias in recent use by her, and the name by which she was commonly known at the time. She was an inmate of the Working Women's Home, and worked as a milliner making straw bonnets at a warehouse on the corner of Broadway and Spring Street.

King met Charles Goodrich after responding to a personal ad in a newspaper, identifying herself to him as Kate Stoddard. A relationship between King and the widower Goodrich ensued, established no later than early 1872. In a letter to Goodrich from early 1872, King refers to him as "my dear Charlie".

She would write seven more letters to Goodrich between then and March 1873, and he would write to her five times. She would sign her letters to him using the alias Amy, or sometimes Kate. The letters indicate that the two had married on 20 May 1872, after which her letters to him are addressed "my dearest husband". Goodrich always addressed King as "Amy" in his letters to her.

Her letters revealed that from June 1872 to February 1873, she had been living at a house on Degraw Street.

His second letter to her after their marriage states that "it is better for both that we should separate". Goodrich's last letter to King states his intention of providing her with a room in New York City and to aid her financially, if she would cease to refer to herself as his wife, and not mention their relationship to his family.

=== Eviction, and a letter to William Goodrich ===
King refused the proposal, and on the evening of 15 February 1873 wrote a letter to his brother William W. Goodrich, sending it to his office.

In that letter, King made many revelations, including that she has been living in the third Brownstone house from Fifth Avenue on Degraw Street. Seven units had been built and owned by Charles Goodrich, and were completed in the fall of 1872; he had assumed residence of the unit at 731 Degraw Street. The letter also indicated that Goodrich had married King in what she now knew was a mock marriage, since the clergyman who conducted the ceremony was Reuben Smith, a doctor by trade and a friend of Goodrich. Further, it notes that Goodrich had treated her cruelly, that they had a child in December, and that on the day she wrote her letter, he had evicted her, throwing her trunks and clothing into another unit. She lamented that she had neither friends nor money, and that "it seems like some dreadful nightmare". She signed the letter Amy G., intended to mean Goodrich.

At the urging of his brother, Charles Goodrich temporarily separated from King for about a week, but she had returned to live with him for at least a few days before he was shot.

== Shooting and investigation ==
When Goodrich attempted to finally terminate the relationship and evict her from his home, King shot him in the head three times. The murder occurred at his home. King had descended to the basement, with Goodrich following her, during an argument. He insisted that she leave his house, and reiterated that he "would do all he could afford for her". At this, she shot him in the head, dragged his body near the fireplace grate, and cleaned off the blood.

A search of the house by police netted a set of letters with "only the Christian name of the writer" (that is, the given name) signed therein.

During the first few days of the investigation, it was hypothesized that Goodrich had committed suicide. The post-mortem investigation revealed that he had been shot three times, the "three bullets in the brain...being as fatal to the theory of self-destruction as they were to the victim". Others persisted in the suicide conjecture; the claim was that he shot himself once, and that the person who discovered him shot him twice more to give the appearance of a murder, and then wiped away the blood. By 25 March, this conjecture was abandoned.

Despite daily questioning of the neighbors up to 26 March, an accurate account of the events could not be established because they offered conflicting information. It was unanimous that a woman was either visiting or living at Goodrich's house, but little was known about her:

We have very little to work on, and there is nobody to give us anything. If this woman has been visiting or stopping at the house, as is alleged, I should think it not unnatural to suppose that somebody should know her name or where she belongs, State or town. Now, I will say emphatically that there is nobody to give any information of this woman, or where she belongs, notwithstanding all that has been stated about letters, and all that. No name is known. I wish it was; the papers would have it mighty quick.

— The New York Times'

The neighbours also unanimously endorsed the hypothesis that it was murder, and that the woman was "directly concerned in the affair".

=== Reward offer ===
Goodrich's body was removed from his residence at 17:00 on 22 March, placed in a hearse, and transported to Cumberland Street, to the residence of his brother William Goodrich. A funeral service was conducted there on the afternoon of 23 March, and his body was then transported on that evening's train to Albany, where he was buried in a family vault the next day. Three days later, William Goodrich offered a $2,500 reward for the capture of the woman who had sent him the letter. On 2 July 1873, Brooklyn Common Council unanimously adopted the motion to offer another $1,000 in reward for the capture of King, bringing the total reward to $3,500.

King had been the primary suspect from the start of the investigation, according to the New York Times:

Yesterday's developments were trivial and unimportant, going only to further establish the undeniable complicity of a woman, and her presence in the house on the night of the murder

— The New York Times'

The name Kate Stoddard was first considered for suspicion in the murder when a book of poems was found in Goodrich's home by detectives Folk and Videtto during their search for evidence. Her name appeared on one of the pages of that book.

By 1 April 1873, several suspects for the murder had been proposed: an Englishman named Barnet or Barrett; a man named James, using the alias "Pop" Tighe, and two other burglars; a Spaniard named Roscoe; and Kate Stoddard, based on several letters that were found during the initial investigation of the crime scene. The suspicion of Roscoe was based on an interview of Lucette Meyers by Chief of Police Patrick Campbell, in which she proposed that Goodrich had been "followed to his house and killed by a man—an enemy". The police efforts were by now being criticized, having failed to apprehend or even nominate a viable suspect. When a New York detective apprehended a Frenchman named Charles Dalzen, of "Hayti, West Indies" (sic), mistakenly believing him to be Roscoe, the New York Times noted:

The clumsy and ineffectual efforts of the Brooklyn detectives were yesterday imitated by a New-York officer.

— The New York Times

Lucette Armstrong had been in jail at this time, unable to make a $1,000 bail. She had refused to divulge information she claimed to know about the murder. The police resorted to using an undercover female detective, labeled a petticoat by the press, "by whose wiles it was confidently expected Mrs. Armstrong would be induced to tell all she is supposed to know about the Goodrich murder". She was placed in the same room as Armstrong, posing as a witness named Lucy in a civil case, but failed to elicit any relevant discussion from Armstrong.

Goodrich's father made a request to coroner Whitehill on 19 April 1873 to inspect the pistol used in the murder. He stated that it was not his son's pistol, which "had a white handle, ivory or pearl, while this is wood". The location of the son's pistol was unaccounted. Lucette Meyers corroborated the father's account in May.

The burglar conjecture was largely ignored as implausible by this time. Various stories regarding Roscoe were known, and by July 1873, he was deemed an accomplice of King to the murder.

Having failed in their search for Stoddard, increasingly the prime suspect in the case, the police hired Mary Handley, making her a detective to the chief of police, paying her a stipend of $2 per day for 40 days. Handley had revealed to the police that she was an "intimate friend" of King's, and had approached the police to assist in searching for her. At first, she dealt with a cold trail as had the other detectives on the case, but after a public tip "relating to the former haunts of Kate Stoddard" was given to the chief, Handley was "put on the track". She made trips to Glen's Falls, Gloversville and Albany, but none were productive.

=== Capture ===
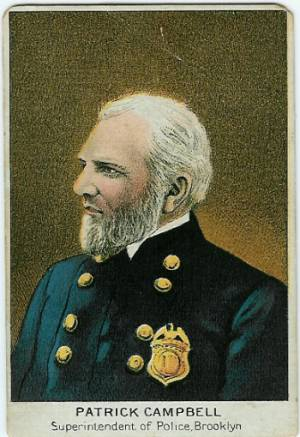
Patrick Campbell, Chief of Police of Brooklyn in 1873, would later become Superintendent of Police for Brooklyn.

By chance, on the afternoon of 8 July 1873 Handley was returning to Brooklyn from Manhattan via the Fulton Ferry, exiting the gates at the ferry dock, when she observed King headed that way, presumably on her way to Manhattan. Handley asked officer Doherty, the on-duty ferry officer, to arrest King. He did so after some persuasion, and took both Handley and King to the Second Precinct Station of the Brooklyn police, at York Street. On the way there, King was seen to discard several letters onto the street, which were collected by the officer.

Here, Handley introduced King to Chief Campbell and Captain James McConnell as the fugitive Kate Stoddard. King was interviewed, but denied the charge that she was Kate Stoddard. Campbell noticed a large gold locket pendant from a chain about her neck, and requested to see it. King denied, but Campbell took it anyway. After fumbling with it for some time, it opened, some of its contents falling to the floor. King picked them up and ate them. They were flakes of desiccated blood. Upon inquiry from the chief, she replied "that's blood—dried blood", then refused to answer any further questions.

She was later taken to the Raymond Street Jail. Meanwhile, Campbell inspected the letters, which were addressed to individuals in Manhattan and New Jersey, and inferred that King must reside in Brooklyn.

At this time, the police were reticent with the media, not yet having ascertained the identity of the woman. The police had, to their embarrassment, mistakenly arrested Lucette Meyers earlier in the investigation.

... their answers to all questions relating to it varying from weak prevarication to flat denial. Captain McConnell, of the Second Precinct, and his sargeants profess astonishment at being suspected of having charge of any prisoner connected with the Goodrich case; Chief Campbell and his detectives know, or profess to know, nothing of the arrest ...

— The New York Times

Meanwhile, detectives were continuing their search for Roscoe, who was now also considered a myth in some circles, and had summoned Dr. Reuben Smith and Charles Green to the police station. Smith and Green were friends of Charles Goodrich, and had met King during her relationship with Goodrich. This would allow the police to identify the woman in jail as Stoddard, whom they knew to be the author of the Amy G. letters.

=== Identification ===
Her identity was incontrovertibly confirmed by 11 July 1873, and King confessed to being Kate Stoddard and to the murder of Goodrich. She also admitted that she had been boarding at the home of the widow Ann Taylor, at 127 High Street in Brooklyn, a three-story brick house near Jay Street. Taylor's daughter Anna Knight would later testify at the inquest, indicating that King used the alias Minnie Waltham in association with Taylor.

King had been living at High Street since the third week of April, continuing to work in Manhattan. By June, however, she discontinued her work commute, instead working from her room at Taylor's house. She had friendly and frequent association with the Taylor family, who were unaware of her true identity; they became concerned about her disappearance on 8 July 1873, but King's friends suggested she had gone to visit her parents, whom she had said lived in Trenton, New Jersey. They learned of her capture by police two days later, when as a result of the confession, an officer was dispatched to Taylor's house.

Taylor was brought to the Second Precinct for questioning, where she identified King by her alias Minnie Waltham.

=== Evidence ===
Subsequently, a police officer and a detective executed a search of King's room at the Taylor residence, where they found two trunks, one of which contained a watch, pocket book, revolver, a ring, and two seals, all possessions of Goodrich, which were seized as evidence.

If the police regarded her confession with doubt, here was corroborative and unmistakable evidence, and in a moment all mystery surrounding the affair had vanished.

— The New York Times

Handley's friends urged her to apply for the reward.

By the time she was captured, King had reverted to using the name Lizzie Lloyd King, and had abandoned the Stoddard alias. She was interested in news about herself, and requested the day's papers while in jail.

After tea in the prison she was provided, at her own request, with the evening papers, and seating herself under the gas-light in the corridor near the cell, she eagerly read over the reports of the earlier proceedings at the inquest, and all else pertaining to herself.

— The New York Times

== Inquest ==
An inquest was held on 12 July 1873 at the court house on Livingston Street. Stoddard arrived by carriage with Captain McConnell at 11:00 that morning, but the court room was already full by 10:00, as some had believed the inquest to start at that time. Spectators who wished to attend the inquest thus had to endure several hours of petty cases, or relinquish their seats to those waiting outside.

The spectators were therefore forced either to relinquish the advantageous positions gained by early attendance or to listen patiently to the hearing of petty larceny cases for two hours.

— The New York Times

The captain escorted King to coroner Whitehill's office, where they met with the jury in consultation for about an hour. Infrequently, the coroner or a juror would enter the courtroom, causing excitement among those assembled of the imminent commencement of the inquest, but they returned to the coroner's office almost immediately. At 13:00, the captain entered the courtroom with Mary Handley, causing a "decided sensation, the majority of the spectators evidently mistaking Miss Handley for Kate Stoddard". By this time there was a throng of people in the hallways wishing to enter the courtroom, though "none but reporters, officials, and the influential outside few were admitted" to the already overcrowded courtroom. The jurors entered the courtroom via the clerk's office at 13:10, promptly taking their seats. King entered the courtroom shortly after via the main corridor, accompanied by Captain McConnell and her counsel William C. de Witt, to a great uproar.

=== Testimony ===
Nine people provided testimonials to the court. Lucette Meyers, who had been quoted in newspapers regarding the murder, identified King by several of her aliases, including Kate Stoddard, Amy Snow, Amy Stone and Amy Gilmore; "she is called by all of these names". She also identified various articles. Adeline Pabor, who had been engaged to Goodrich for months before the murder, testified that Goodrich had introduced her to King, claiming King was his sister. She also identified articles presented to her.

Mary Handley testified next, and stated that she had known King when they had roomed together at an apartment at 45 Elizabeth Street, between February and June or July 1872. At the time, King was known as Kate Stoddard, and made straw bonnets. King then left for the Working-women's Home, and they did not see each other again until Handley spotted King on Fulton Street in Brooklyn, at which time she requested an officer apprehend King. Handley was employed as a detective for chief Campbell at this time.

Anna Knight was the fourth person to testify. She indicated that King boarded at a home owned by Knight's mother at 127 High Street, and diligently paid her rent of $2.50 per week despite being "in rather poor circumstances". Knight indicated that King used the alias Minnie Waltham during her stay from April 1873 until her capture. She worked in New York, or sometimes brought it home with her.

The father of the victim, David Goodrich, was next to take the stand. He identified various items, but noted that the wooden-handled pistols were not like that owned by his son, which was white-handled. He also noted that in February 1872, a woman brought him a letter, signed Amy G.; he had verified some of the contents of the letter with his son, and advised him that he extricate himself from the position resultant from the association with King.

Captain McConnell testified that he had seized a trunk from King's boarding room on High Street, and that it contained the items presented to the court, and two pistols, one of which was used to fire the three shots that killed the victim. He noted that King had been apprehended and brought to the Second Precinct station at noon the previous Tuesday.

Charles Green noted that he had spent a night in Goodrich's house with King, during which she penned the letter signed Amy G., and identified the articles presented to the court.

General Jourdan, the president of the Board of Police Commissioners, testified that the day before the trial, he had warned King "not to commit herself to the Jury without the advice of counsel".

Patrick Campbell, the Chief of Police of Brooklyn, indicated that King had made statements "as to the manner in which Charles Goodrich came to his death", and that she requested that she be called Amy G. during her first interrogation at the police station. He also stated that he had hired Mary Handley as a detective "on account of her personal acquaintance with Kate Stoddard".

Finally, King herself was called to the stand, and identified herself as Lizzie Lloyd King, and that she was a bonnet maker. She declined further comment regarding Goodrich, on advice from her counsel, and was dismissed.

=== Verdict ===
The jury retired at 16:00, and at 16:30 returned to the courtroom to announce that the testimony was sufficient to render a verdict. They received the usual instructions from the judge, then retired for final deliberations, during which time the courtroom crowd openly discussed the possible outcome.

At 18:00, the jury returned, and rendered the verdict:

We find that the said Charles Goodrich came to his death by pistol-shot wounds in the head, inflicted by Lizzie Lloyd King, alias Kate Stoddard, with intent to cause death, on the evening of the 20th or morning of the 21st of March, 1873, at his aforesaid house on Degraw-street, Brooklyn.

— The New York Times

== Jailhouse ==
King was remanded into the custody of sheriff and keeper Courady of the county jail at Raymond Street, where she was assigned to a room by herself on the second floor. Three prisoners at the jail, Fanny Hyde, Mrs. Burgess, and Mrs. Simmons, were assigned to keep constant watch over her to prevent a suicide attempt. Simmons and Burgess were pardoned by the governor on 19 July 1873, and subsequently released from jail and their supervisory duties. Miss Palin, betrothed to Goodrich, visited King on 14 July 1873 and stayed until late in the evening. The police were still looking for Roscoe at this time, and sent a description of him to "the police of all the cities in the United States and Canada".

On 22 July 1873, her father and brother-in-law visited her at the jail, with her counsel for the future trial, O.T. Gray of Hyde Park. During the visit, which lasted over three hours, nobody else was allowed into that part of the prison. By this time, her family resided at Walbridge, Massachusetts.

Her new counsel, D.B. Thompson, made an application to the court on 2 March 1874 to release himself from "further conduct in the case", citing the actions of King to dismiss various previous counsels, and that "so many embarrassments had been put in their way". Judge Gilbert denied the request, and instructed Thompson and Lowe to act as defense counsel for King. Thompson indicated that although the defense was insanity, "the accused is not now insane, but was insane at the time of the crime, if any crime is proven, was committed".

While in jail, she was deemed to be of normal disposition:

Her conduct in jail continues without any marked eccentricity, although it is mysteriously whispered among the lower ranks of the police force that the prisoner is insane.

— The New York Times

She was also said to be "pretending to be very religious", reading the Bible and Episcopal prayer book.

== Commitment to State Lunatic Asylum ==
Dr. Charles Corey examined King sometime in May 1874 to evaluate her psychological condition, and on 21 July 1874 she was committed to State Lunatic Asylum in Auburn, New York. King had stated a preference for the new asylum in Poughkeepsie, and to stay at the Raymond Street Jail until that facility's completion. On 14 July 1874 the District Attorney had sent a letter requesting information about the status of the Poughkeepsie facility, and whether it would be accepting patients. A court investigation into her state of mind concluded on 15 July 1874 that she was not fit for trial, and that an order of commitment would be issued pending a reply from the Poughkeepsie facility. Even when sent to Auburn, she inquired whether she could be transferred to the Poughkeepsie facility upon its completion: "If I go to Auburn now, I wish to know if I can be transferred to Poughkeepsie as soon as there is any room for me there".

She continued to read stories about herself, even sending complaint letters to newspapers about inaccuracies in the reports she read. On 17 July 1874, she objected to the wording of the commitment announcement by Judge Moore, noting that he misrepresented the jury's indictment from the inquest:

Your Honor's attention I wish to call to the wording of your commitment of me in yesterday's newspapers. It reads that I was indicted for having "feloniously, and willfully, and of her malice aforethought, killed and wounded Charles Goodrich." Please, your Honor, I was present when the indictment was read, July, 1873, and it read: "That Charles Goodrich came to his death by pistol shot wounds in the head, inflicted with intent to cause death."

— The New York Times

A syndicated report in the Oswego Daily Times of 18 May 1880 indicates that at the asylum, King had composed a curious letter:

... by cutting separate letters from a book furnished by the American Bible Society. These were arranged so as to make a readable letter, and then sowed letter by letter, word by word, sentence by sentence, until two full sheets (both sides) were covered. Even the directions on the envelope were wrought in the same way. She resorted to this method in order to carry her purpose, inasmuch as the inmates are prohibited from having either pens, ink, paper, knife or scissors.

— Oswego Daily Times

King was criticizing the New York state "lunacy law" authorizing that those indicted for a crime, but not convicted, be sent to an insane asylum. She considered this an ex post facto law. The letter was given to Alonzo B. Cornell, the Governor of New York.

== Aftermath ==
Neighborhood residents were concerned about "the unpleasant associations" of the name of their street to the murder, that within days they had petitioned to change it to "Lincoln Place", in honor of Abraham Lincoln. The name of the street, between Fifth Avenue and Sixth Avenue, was changed from Degraw Street to Lincoln Place on 15 April 1873 by the Brooklyn Common Council. Eventually, the remainder of the eastward segment, to Prospect Park, was also renamed to Lincoln Place.

In May 1873, Goodrich's father filed a lawsuit against Mrs. Finlay of Staten Island. They had an apparent agreement to exchange the brownstone houses owned by Charles Goodrich for the clipper brig Hattie Haskett owned by Finlay. The suit was denied because it was signed by Finlay's husband, who "had not been shown to be an authorized agent for his wife".

By 1874, Handley had made an application to claim the $1,000 reward offered by Brooklyn Common Council in June 1873. After the Law Committee of the council heard testimony on 24 November 1874 from Handley, and corroboration from Patrick Campbell and General Jourdan, it passed a resolution recommending the payment of that reward; the committee would present the resolution to council when it next convened.

In the book Women Who Kill, Ann Jones argues that women like Lizzie Lloyd King, who are subjugated from childhood and then abandoned by their mates, are capable of engaging in crimes they would not otherwise commit to prevent their own destitution.

Their stories are almost interchangeable. Like Amelia Norman and like the typical seduced-and-abandoned maiden sketched in the pages of the Advocate, all of these women were young, poor, friendless, and innocent.

— Women Who Kill, page 153

== Recollections ==
A newspaper report in 1889 about Charles McElvaine, who murdered a grocer, recounted the Goodrich murder. It incorrectly noted that Stoddard "remained in hiding for over six months" (it was actually three and a half months).

Those involved in the case would reminisce about it years later. In 1895, speaking to officers at police headquarters after announcing his retirement, Patrick Campbell spoke about the loyalty necessary to conduct police duties, citing the King case as an exemplary demonstration of that loyalty:

There's where the loyalty of the Captains came in. It would have been death to me to have made a failure. The community would have risen up against me for interference with personal rights. I don't think I could have lived in this city if it had been a non-success. This case is an example of your loyalty to me. I have tested your loyalty, and I say to you that I'll never forget you as long as I live.

— The New York Times

In a 1906 interview with the Brooklyn Daily Standard Union, Campbell, 80 years old at this time, recounted a few of his most memorable cases. He was chief of police for Brooklyn from 1870 until 1895, and identified the Kate Stoddard case as "a great one". Although he accurately recounted many details, he also stated that "as she made no effort to escape we got her easily enough". After she was sent to the asylum in 1874, he no longer kept track of her. "A commission adjudged her insane and she was sent to an asylum. She may be living yet, for all I know."
