= William Latimer =

William Latimer may refer to:

- William Latimer (epidemiologist), American infectious disease epidemiologist and academic administrator
- William Latimer (priest) (c. 1467–1545), English clergyman and scholar of Ancient Greek
- William Latimer (Australian politician) (1858–1935), New South Wales politician
- William Latimer, 4th Baron Latimer (1330–1381)
- William Latymer (1499–1583), English evangelical clergyman
- William Latimer, 1st Baron Latimer (died 1304)
- William Latimer, 2nd Baron Latimer (died 1327), Baron Latimer
- William Latimer, 3rd Baron Latimer (c. 1300–1335), Baron Latimer
- William Thomas Latimer (1842–1919), Irish Presbyterian minister, antiquarian, and historian
