= Lief =

Lief may refer to:

- Harold Lief (1917–2007), American psychiatrist
- Jacob Lief (fl. 1989–2018), American humanitarian
- Leonard Lief (1924–2007), president of Lehman College

== See also ==
- Lev (disambiguation)
- Leif, a given name
