= Matt O'Dowd =

Matt O'Dowd may refer to:

- Matt O'Dowd (astrophysicist) (born 1973), Australian academic and science communicator
- Matt O'Dowd (runner) (born 1976), British Olympic marathon runner
