= Alyshia Gálvez =

American anthropologist

- Awards: 2012 ALLA Book Award

Academic background
- Thesis: In the name of Guadalupe: Religion, politics and citizenship among Mexicans in New York (2004)
- Doctoral advisor: Thomas A. Abercrombie

Academic work
- Discipline: Anthropology
- Sub-discipline: Medical Anthropology, Cultural Anthropology
- Institutions: Lehman College
- Website: https://www.alyshiagalvez.com

Alyshia Gálvez is a cultural and medical anthropologist. She is a professor of Latin American and Latino Studies at Lehman College of City University of New York (CUNY). Gálvez was substitute chair of the Department of Latin American and Latino Studies at Lehman College. She is the author of three single-authored books. Her book Patient Citizens, Immigrant Mothers: Mexican Women, Public Prenatal Care, and the Birth-weight Paradox won the 2012 ALLA Book Award by the Association of Latino and Latina Anthropologists (ALLA).

== Early life ==
Gálvez completed her PhD in Anthropology from New York University in 2004.

== Research and writing ==
In 2012, she was the founding-director of the Mexican Studies Institute at CUNY. At the time, 43 percent of the student body in Bronx was Latino. One of its founding missions was to provide support for research, community projects, and organisations engaging with New York's Mexican diaspora.

=== Patient Citizens, Immigrant Mothers: Mexican Women Public Prenatal Care, and the Birth-weight Paradox ===
Patient Citizens is a book published by Rutgers University Press in 2012. It is a multisited ethnographic study conducted in New York as well as Mexican states of Oaxaca and Puebla. The book engages with two interrelated phenomena associated with the birth-weight paradox. One, the pregnancy-related care practices of Mexican immigrants. Two, the rapid decline in these practices. The brisk decline in some of these cultural practices is also related to erosion of associated memory or gap between generations. Patient Citizens accounts for the participation of women in abandoning some of these practices while maintaining the efficacy for them. Immigration to United States has an erosive impact on the protective benefits that Mexican women would have had back home. Migrant women's decisions around pregnancy never exist in a vacuum. They are embedded in broad societal trends, events, and pressures. Thereby, these decisions are intertwined with family's immigrant stories, socio-economic background, perceptions of around bearing a child at that moment, and much more. Central to this book are 'the enthusiasm many immigrant women have for what they perceive to be a technologically superior, modern health care system and the role accessing that system plays in their stories of immigration aspiration.' Through her research, Gálvez finds,

when Mexican immigrant women access public prenatal care, they enter a system in which their prior knowledge about self-care in pregnancy and childbirth is often displaced, and they are instructed to behave as particular kinds of needy patients. These processes may ultimately undermine the protective and healthful habits and attitudes with which they entered the system. It is important to trace some of the ways this displacement occurs. It is my contention that these processes go a long way toward explaining the perinatal advantage of recent immigrant women and its decline with increased duration in the United States.

Medical Anthropologist Nicole S. Berry praises the book as an 'excellent addition' to Migration studies, Women's health, American studies, and Medical anthropology. Sociologist Elena Gutiérrez points that the strength of the book is its rich ethnographic data drawn from binational sample and sites of analysis.

The book received the 2012 ALLA Book Award by the Association of Latino and Latina Anthropologists (ALLA).

=== Eating NAFTA: Trade, Food Policies, and the Destruction of Mexico ===
Published by the University of California Press in 2018, this multi-sited ethnography, looks at how the North American Free Trade Agreement (NAFTA) has caused drastic decline in Mexico's crop diversity, alienated millions of farmers with small land holdings, and resulted in a public health crisis. At the center of the book's narrative is the changing political and social life and inequalities emerging from the NAFTA-induced farming system in Mexico. The book received the Anne G. Lipow Endowment Fund in Social Justice and Human Rights. In her review of the book, Anthropologist Laura Kihlström writes that the book is 'timely and well-research... on how neoliberalism, through trans-national trade deals and ideological shifts, impact people's sovereignty in defining their food systems and foodways.' Elites and other privileged class often reap benefits from such agreements while marginalized communities experience devastating consequences. Thereby, the book is a critical intervention in the existing literature on food security.

In 2019, the book was one of the two honourable mentions at the Latin American Studies Association's Best Social Science Book Award in the Mexico section.

In 2022, the book was published in Spanish on Fondo de Cultural Ecónomica as Comer con el TLC: Comercio, políticas alimentarias y la destrucción de México. In a 2024 review in Revista Mexicana de Sociología, Libertad Castro Colina wrote that the book is "una espléndida obra y por su profundo análisis, que refleja la realidad alimenticia mexicana a los dos lados de la frontera," is a splendid work that with its deep analysis, reflects the reality of the Mexican food system on both sides of the border.

=== Guadalupe in New York: Devotion and the Struggle for Citizenship Rights among Mexican Immigrants ===
Published by New York University Press in 2009, Guadalupe in New York is Gálvez's first book, revised from her PhD dissertation. This multi-sited ethnography examines the activism for immigration reform by organizations called comités guadalupanos, confraternal social organizations that were then linked under the umbrella of Asociación Tepeyac. In small and large forms of activism, devotional practices to Our Lady of Guadalupe and community organizing, the members of these organizations sought to achieve immigration reform enabling Mexican migrants in the United States to regularize their status.

== Select journal articles ==
- 2022. Valdez, N., Carney, M., Yates-Doerr, E., Saldaña-Tejeda, A., Hardin, J., Garth, H., Gálvez, A. and Dickinson, M. (2022), Duoethnography as Transformative Praxis: Conversations about Nourishment and Coercion in the COVID-Era Academy. Feminist Anthropology.
- 2022 Yates-Doerr, E., Vasquez, E., Saldaña Tejeda, A, Brady, J., Gálvez, A., The politics and practices of representing bodies in capitalism. A discussion about public health in Mexico & beyond. Critical Dietetics, 6(2).
- 2021 Saldaña, S, and Gálvez, A. ““I’m not like that”: Navigating stereotypes, social contexts, and identity among people who follow restrictive dietary regimens,” Food Studies, 11 (2): 1-20.

=== Works cited ===
- Gálvez, Alyshia (2012). Patient Citizens, Immigrant Mothers: Mexican Women, Public Prenatal Care, and the Birth Weight Paradox. Rutgers University Press.
- Gálvez, Alyshia (2018). Eating NAFTA: Trade, Food Policies, and the Destruction of Mexico. University of California Press.
- Gálvez, Alyshia (2009). Guadalupe in New York. New York University Press.
