= Andrea Apolo =

American medical oncologist

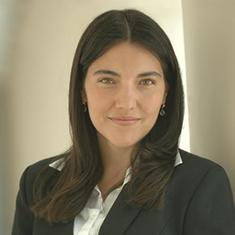
- Education: Lehman College (BS); Albert Einstein College of Medicine (MD)
- Scientific career
- Fields: Medical oncology, clinical trials
- Workplaces: National Cancer Institute

Andrea B. Apolo is an American medical oncologist specialized in bladder cancer research. She is an investigator in the National Cancer Institute's genitourinary malignancies branch and head of the bladder cancer section.

== Education ==
Apolo graduated summa cum laude from Lehman College with a Bachelor of Science in chemistry and biochemistry. She earned her medical degree at Albert Einstein College of Medicine. Apolo completed residency training in internal medicine at New York-Presbyterian Hospital and then completed a medical oncology fellowship at Memorial Sloan Kettering Cancer Center.

== Career ==
In 2010, she was recruited to the National Cancer Institute’s (NCI) Physician-Scientist Early Investigator Program to build a translational bladder cancer program. Apolo serves within the Center for Cancer Research of the National Cancer Institute as Head of the Bladder Cancer Section of the Genitourinary Malignancies Branch and Director of the Bladder Cancer and Genitourinary Tumors Multidisciplinary Clinic.

Apolo serves on national and National Institutes of Health committees. She has been an investigator on over 35 clinical trials and authored more than 80 scientific papers or chapters which have been cited over 1,800 times. She serves on a number of editorial boards, and has made over 100 scientific presentations at universities and national/international meetings.

=== Research ===
Apolo designs and implements clinical trials to test novel agents for the treatment of urologic cancers. Her research focuses on developing targeted therapies for bladder cancer and rare genitourinary tumors, including immunotherapies, angiogenesis inhibitors, and agents that target MET, and in identifying molecular alterations that will serve as targets for individualized treatment strategies. Apolo manages clinical development of immunotherapeutic agents and immunotherapeutic combinations in cancer and genitourinary tumors. She led the bladder cancer study of avelumab that resulted in FDA approval in advanced bladder cancer.

== Awards and honors ==
Apolo received a 2011 National Institutes of Health Award of Merit, the 2014 Lasker Clinical Research Scholars Program Award, the 2018 National Cancer Institute's Director's Award for Clinical Science, the 2018 Advancing Cancer Treatment Award for leadership in genitourinary clinical trial patient access, and the 2020 Arthur S. Flemming Award for leaders who make an impact in public service. She was also recognized as one of the 100 Influential Women in Oncology by OncoDaily.
