= Raphael Rakowski =

American entrepreneur and investor

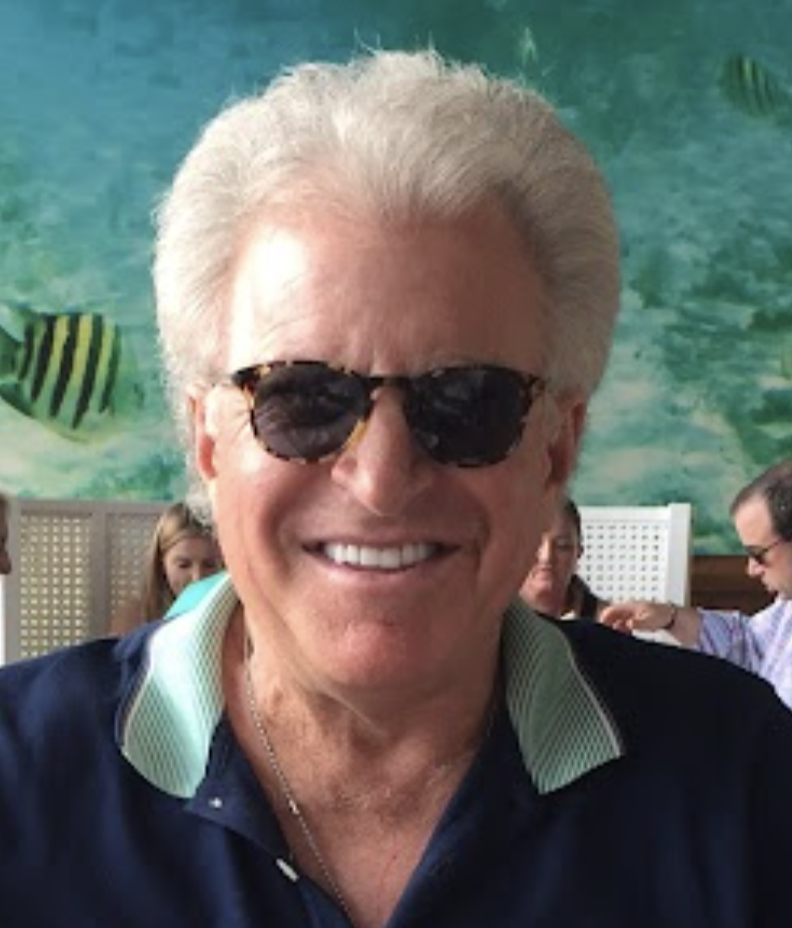
- Rakowski in 2022
- Born: Richard Rakowski; 1952 (age 73–74)
- Occupations: Entrepreneur, investor, healthcare system disruptor
- Known for: Founding Medically Home Group

Raphael Rakowski (born Richard; 1952) is an American entrepreneur and investor. He has had a 45-year career in sales, engineering consulting, and entrepreneurial start-ups in health care services and renewable energy. He is a public speaker and advocate for changes to the American health care system. He is the subject of a documentary film examining the effects of the Holocaust on his childhood.

== Life and career ==
Raphael Rakowski graduated from Lehman College in 1973 with a bachelor's degree in political science. He then served as a Rotary Foundation ambassador of good will in Germany, where he studied the Holocaust. He began his career in Honeywell as a sales engineer. He then became an operations consultant to Fortune 100 clients in North America, South America and Europe working with over 100 manufacturing and distribution facilities.

From 1980 to 1986, Rakowski provided strategic and operating consulting services for Fortune 500 manufacturing companies.

In 1986, he launched Evan Kristen Specialty Foods, which developed technology for washing, cutting and packaging fresh produce.

From 1989 to 1992, Rakowski was a partner at Marketing Corporation of America (now the Growth Platforms Institute, a part of the Interpublic Group), where he provided marketing counsel to Fortune 100 companies.

In 1992, he founded and led New Paradigm Ventures (NPV), a consulting and investment firm in the health care and food industry markets. A study conducted by NPV on medical outcomes improvement resulted in the care enhancement strategy that Mr. Rakowski brought to American Healthways to respond to perceived gaps in the U.S. health care system. During his tenure, Healthways stock grew from $18 per share to a non-split-adjusted $53 per share on a roughly 10% increase in volume. New Paradigm Ventures developed new business ventures in conjunction with international brands such as Campbell Soup Company and General Nutrition Centers.

He served as President of American Healthways (now Healthways, Inc.), a large market cap health care company based in Nashville, TN, which serves the needs of patients with chronic and acute health conditions. He founded Klinger Advanced Aesthetics (now Cosmedicine Companies), a company that focused on bringing medicinal clinical trials research to the beauty products market. His work in health care and aesthetics has been featured in the New York Times, Wall Street Journal, Time Magazine, and other media outlets.

In 2007, he founded Intersection, LLC, a company that developed and funded new business strategies in the health care and renewable energy fields and c-India, a new company designed to bring best practice clinical research to India while supporting Indian public health initiatives.

In 2010, Rakowski led a team of engineers and clinicians in the creation of Clinically Home, the first commercially scalable model to enable safe, high acuity hospitalization at home. A published clinical trial in 2015 validated the model. In 2017, Raphael and his team created a next-gen version of Clinically Home called Medically Home and joined forces with Atrius Health to bring the Program to market, where patients are being treated with the model today.

After his role as founder and CEO, in 2022, Raphael was named Executive Chairman of Medically Home Group, Inc. In 2022, Medically Home operated in 18 states with a large number of strategic customers and partners, including Mayo Clinic, Kaiser Permanente, the Cleveland Clinic, Yale New Haven Health, Baxter Health and Cardinal Health. By 2025, Medically Home's model of care has been used for more than 50,000 patients. He is a frequent speaker at healthcare events including the Digital Health Summit at CES in Las Vegas. The recent book, "Beyond the Walls" by Zeev Neuwirth, featured Mr. Rakowski's highly disruptive work in leading the care decentralization movement.

In 2024, in response to a challenging event with a relative involving opioids, Mr. Rakowski founded Neurofinity, a firm dedicated to developing advanced next generation treatment solutions for patients suffering with substance use disorder.

Mr. Rakowski and his father were featured in the documentary film Mr. Rakowski, which premiered at the International Documentary Film Festival Amsterdam and examines the effects of the Holocaust on his childhood and their relationship.

He resides in Sedona, AZ, and is the father of six children and grandfather of four.

== See also ==
- Health care
