= David Freeman Hawke =

American historian

David Freeman Hawke (died 1999 at age 75) was an American historian. His book Benjamin Rush: Revolutionary Gadfly became a National Book Award nominee in 1972. Hawke was born in Philadelphia and held degrees from Swarthmore College, the University of Wisconsin and the University of Pennsylvania. He taught at Pace College for 14 years before joining Lehman College in 1972. He retired in 1986.

== Life ==
Hawke was born in Philadelphia, Pennsylvania, United States.

He died in 1999 in Madison, Connecticut, United States.

== Career ==
He was professor emeritus of American history at Lehman College of the City University of New York.

== Bibliography ==
- Hawke, David Freeman (1964). A Transaction of Free Men: The Birth & Course of the Declaration of Independence. Scribner. ISBN 9780306803529.
- Hawke, David Freeman (1971). Benjamin Rush: Revolutionary Gadfly. Bobbs Merrill. ISBN 978-0672515996.
- Hawke, David Freeman (1976). Captain John Smith's History of Virginia. The Bobbs-Merrill Company. ASIN B001F8C0V8.
- Hawke, David Freeman (1989). Everyday Life in Early America. Harper & Row. ISBN 978-0060912512.
- Hawke, David Freeman (1976). Franklin. Harper & Row. ISBN 978-0060117795.
- Hawke, David Freeman (1976). Honorable Treason: The Declaration of Independence and the Men Who Signed It. Viking Adult. ISBN 978-0670378579.
- Hawke, David Freeman (1980). John D. The Founding Father of the Rockefellers. Harper & Row. ISBN 978-0060118136.
- Hawke, David Freeman (2012). In the Midst of a Revolution. Literary Licensing. ISBN 978-1258228699.
- Hawke, David Freeman (1988). Nuts & Bolts of the Past: A History of American Technology 1776-1860. Harper & Row. ISBN 978-0060159016.
- Hawke, David Freeman (1974). Paine. Harper & Row. ISBN 978-0060117849.
- Hawke, David Freeman (1998). Stranded at Plimoth Plantation 1626. Topeka Bindery. ISBN 978-0613105323.
- Hawke, David Freeman (1980). Those Tremendous Mountains: The Story of the Lewis & Clark Expedition. Norton. ISBN 978-0393013054.
- Hawke, David Freeman (1966). U.S. Colonial Readings and Documents. Bobbs-Merrill. ISBN 978-0672607073.
