= Patricia Thompson (writer) =

American novelist (1926–2016)

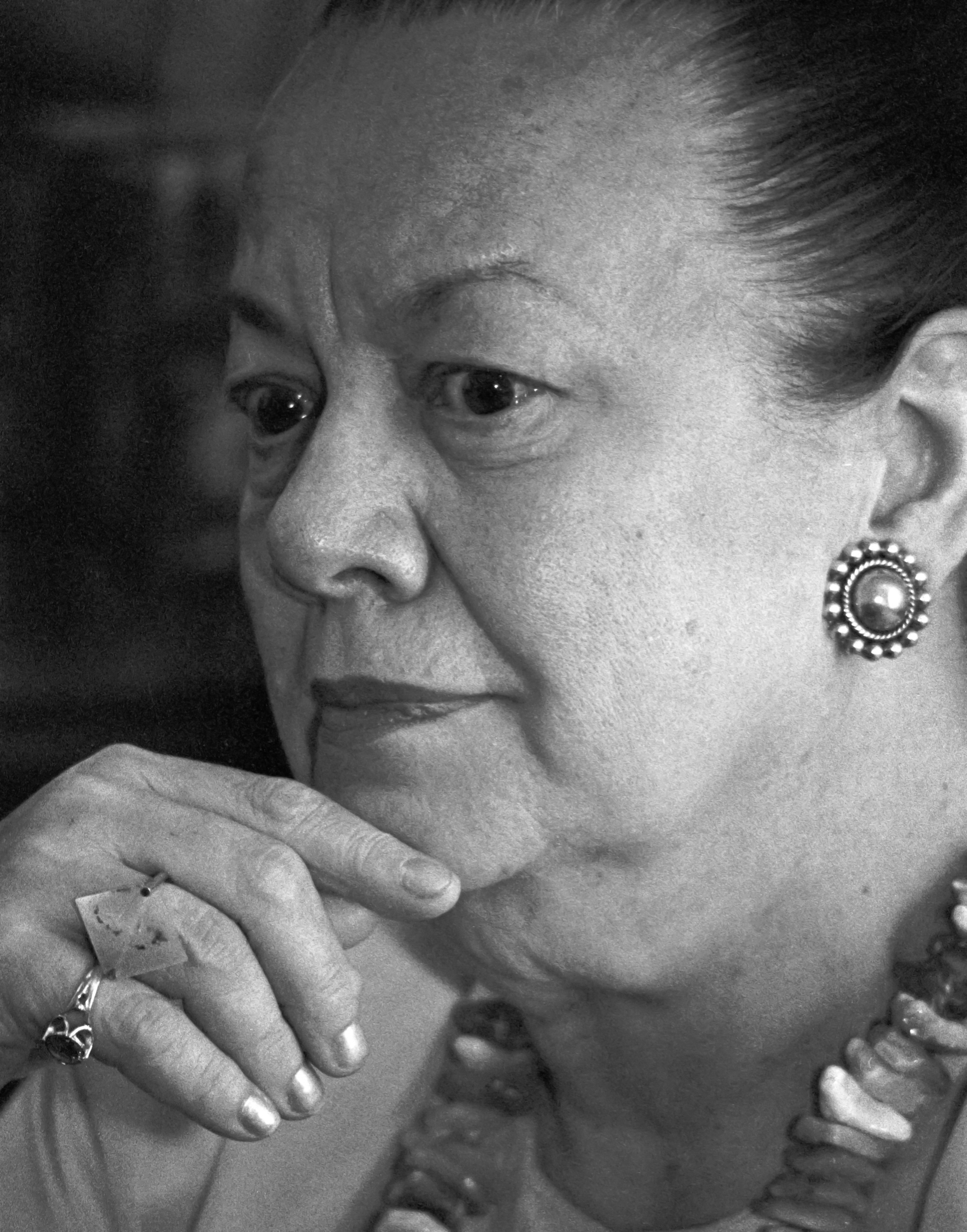
- Born: June 15, 1926; New York City, U.S.
- Died: April 1, 2016 (aged 89); New York, U.S.
- Other name: Yelena Vladimirovna Mayakovskaya (Russian: Елена Владимировна Маяковская)
- Partner: Olin Thompson
- Children: Roger Thompson
- Parent(s): Vladimir Mayakovsky; Elli Jones
- Relatives: Lyudmila Mayakovskaya (aunt)

Patricia J. Thompson (June 15, 1926 – April 1, 2016), also known as Yelena Vladimirovna Mayakovskaya (Russian: Елена Владимировна Маяковская), was an American philosopher and author of more than 20 books. She was one of the two known children of the poet Vladimir Mayakovsky, the other being Gleb-Nikita Lavinsky (1921–1986). This fact was kept a secret until 1991.

== Biography ==
In summer 1925, Vladimir Mayakovsky visited New York, where he met Russian émigré Elli Jones (born Yelizaveta Petrovna Zibert), an interpreter who spoke Russian, French, German, and English fluently. They fell in love, for three months were inseparable, but decided to keep their affair secret. Soon after the poet's return to the Soviet Union, Elli gave birth to Patricia. Mayakovsky saw her just once, in Nice, France, in 1928, when she was three.

By the time Thompson was born, her mother married George Jones, who treated Thompson as his own daughter, both privately and officially – Patricia had his last name in her youth. He taught English to Patricia, who then spoke a little bit of Russian, German and French. Later, when she gave birth to a son, she named him George after her stepfather.

Thompson became a professor of philosophy and women's studies at Lehman College in New York. She published a book describing her parents' love affair, based on her mother's unpublished memoirs and their conversations. In 1991, after the death of her mother and during the final months of the collapse of the Soviet Union by the end of the year, she traveled to Russia with her son, where they were welcomed with respect. From that point until her death, she kept dual names, Patricia Thompson and Yelena Vladimirovna Mayakovskaya. In 2015 she expressed her wish to learn Russian, which she could not speak anymore, and to obtain Russian citizenship.
