= Thomas Kurtzman =

Thomas Kurtzman is an American physical chemist most notable for his research into the use of convolutional neural networks (CNNs) to improve pharmaceutical design. According to Bioworld, Kurtzman's research "reached the devastating conclusion that 'the entirety'" of apparent deep learning produced over the course of several years by a CNN dataset highly regarded in academia and industry was illusory. The perceived scientific progress, Kurtzman wrote, was due to CNNs' effective learning of the deficiencies in the dataset. "This is alarming," the article continued, "as companies have been built on this research.

During the COVID-19 pandemic, a computational tool Kurtzman developed, GIST, was used to research potential new drugs to treat the illness.

Kurtzman is a professor of chemistry at the Lehman College and the Graduate Center of the City University of New York. His research is conducted at the affiliated Kurtzman Lab and funded by the National Institutes of Health.

He is married to Mor Armony, vice dean for faculty and research at New York University's Stern School of Business.
