= Lehman College =

Public college in the Bronx, New York, US

- Other name: Herbert H. Lehman College
- Former name: Bronx Branch of Hunter College (1931–1968)
- Type: Public college
- Established: 1931
- Parent institution: City University of New York
- Endowment: $35 million
- President: Fernando Delgado
- Undergraduates: 12,639
- Postgraduates: 2,148
- Location: New York City, New York, United States; 40°52′21″N 73°53′38″W
- Campus: 37 acres (15 ha); Urban
- Colors: Royal blue, Vegas gold, and white
- Nickname: Lightning
- Sporting affiliations: NCAA Division III, City University of New York Athletic Conference (CUNYAC)
- Mascot: Lightning Bug
- Website: www.lehman.cuny.edu

Lehman College (/ˈliːmən/ LEE-mən) is a public college in New York City, United States. Founded in 1931 as the Bronx campus of Hunter College, it became an independent college in 1967. The college is named after Herbert H. Lehman, a former New York governor, United States senator, and philanthropist. It is a senior college of the City University of New York (CUNY) and offers more than 90 undergraduate and graduate degree programs and specializations.

== History ==
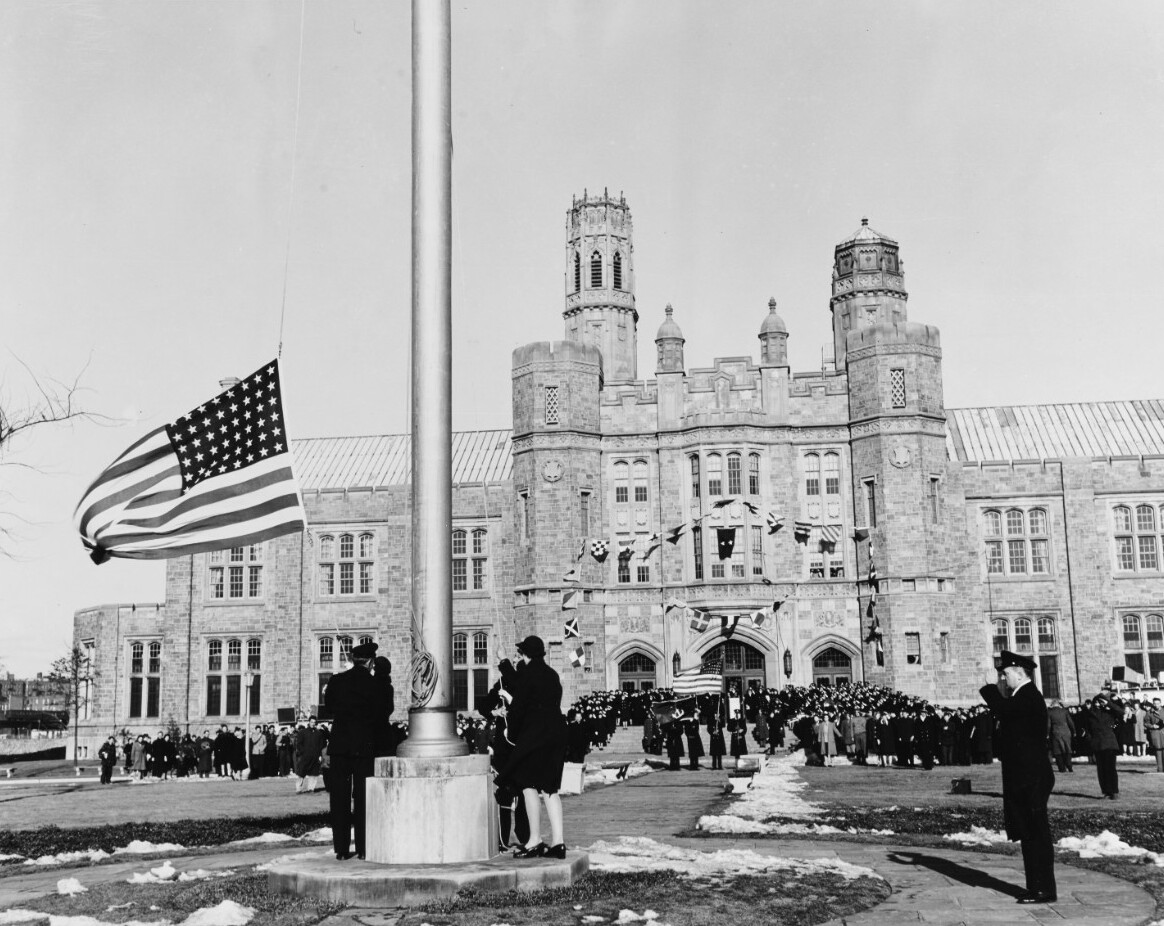
First flag raising, commissioning ceremonies for the U.S. Naval Training Center, Women's Reserve, Bronx, on February 8, 1943

The Bronx Branch of Hunter College was first established in 1931.

The campus was the main national training ground for women in the military during World War II. For a decade before the entry of the United States in World War II, only women students attended, taking their first two years of study at the Bronx campus and then transferring to Hunter's Manhattan campus to complete their undergraduate work. During the war, Hunter leased the Bronx Campus buildings to the United States Navy who used the facilities to train 95,000 women volunteers for military service as WAVES and SPARS.

When the Navy vacated the campus, the site was occupied for six months in 1946 by the nascent United Nations, which held its first Security Council sessions at the Bronx campus. From March to August 1946, the first American meetings of the United Nations Security Council were held in the Gymnasium Building where intercollegiate basketball, archery, swimming, and other sports have been played. During festivities marking the 40th anniversary of the United Nations in 1986, the Southern New York State Division of the United Nations Association presented the college with a commemorative plaque, now displayed outside the Gymnasium Building. The college participated in the United Nations' 50th anniversary activities in 1995–96.

The process of separating Lehman College from its Hunter College-affiliated predecessor began in 1967, culminating in the establishment of an independent unit of the City University of New York on July 1, 1968. This new college, known as Herbert H. Lehman College or Lehman College, was established as a senior undergraduate college. The newly established school was named after Herbert H. Lehman, the former, four-term governor of New York. Lehman College's founding president was Leonard Lief.

A Lehman-Hiroshima campus existed from 1990 to 1994. This campus was established as a study-abroad opportunity for CUNY students as well as an institution for Japanese students to experience an American education system.

President Lief was succeeded by Ricardo R. Fernández in 1991. In 2016, José Luis Cruz was appointed as the third president of the college. In 2019, Cruz was appointed as the CUNY Executive Vice Chancellor and stepped down from the Lehman presidency. On February 21, 2021, the CUNY board of trustees appointed Fernando Delgado to succeed interim president Daniel Lemons as the fourth president of the college.

The college switched to remote learning on March 11, 2020, in response to the coronavirus outbreak. Later, in April, the university released a study that concluded that the virus could be spread through a building's ventilation system. On October 5, 2020, 98% of classes were fully online due to the coronavirus pandemic. On May 26, 2022, after two years of conducting commencement ceremonies online due to the COVID-19 restrictions regarding mass gathering in NYC, Lehman held its first commencement ceremony post COVID-19 lockdowns.

== Campus ==
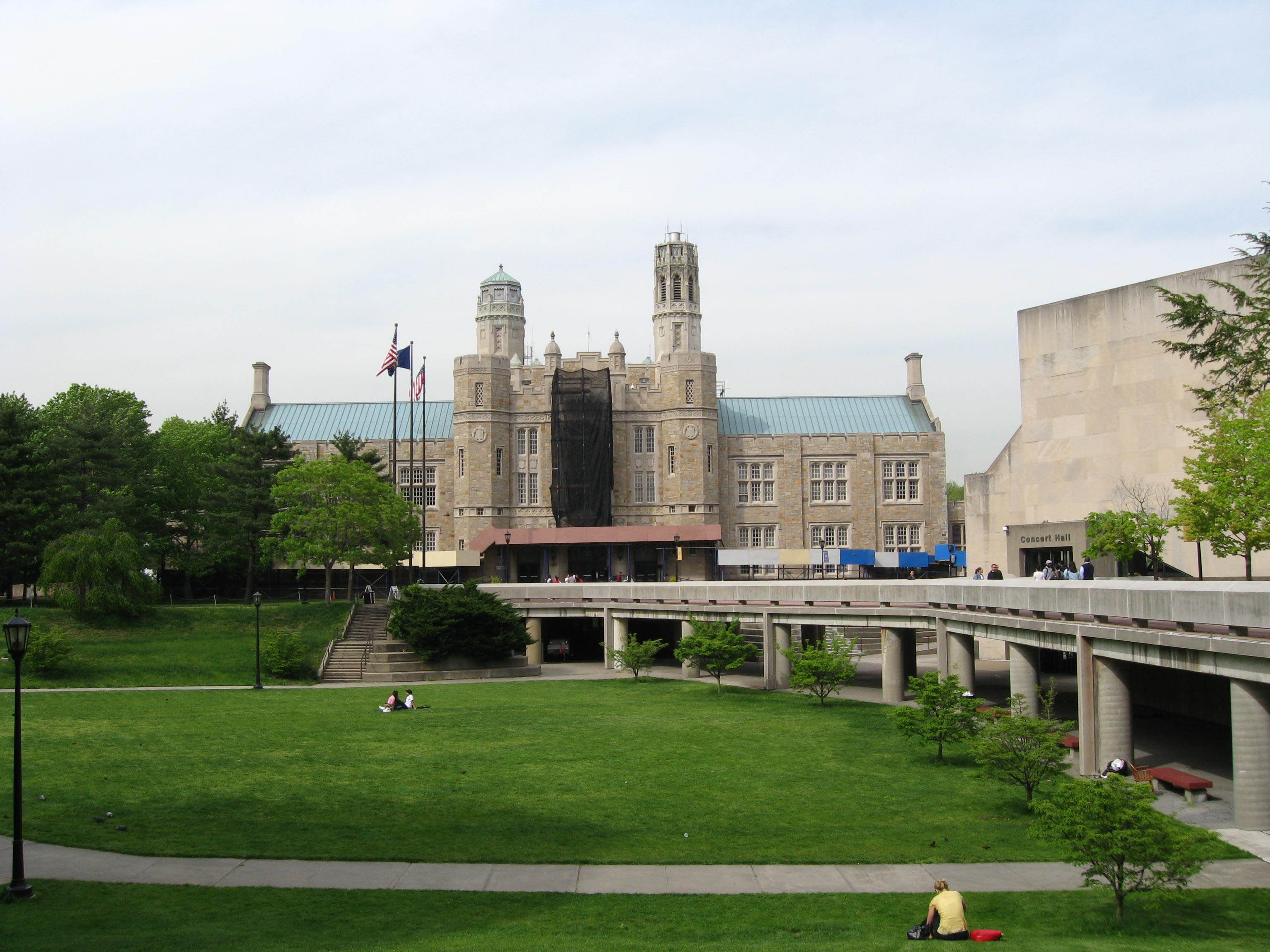
Lehman College Plaza and Music Building

Lehman has a 37-acre (15 hectare) campus with a combination of Collegiate Gothic and modern architecture, located near the Jerome Park Reservoir at 250 Bedford Park Boulevard West (250 West 200th Street). The school's architects were Kerr Rainsford, John A. Thompson, and Gerald A. Holmes; they had earlier designed the Archdiocesan Cathedral of the Holy Trinity in Manhattan's Upper East Side.

Lehman College houses a multimedia center in Carman Hall, comprising an acoustically designed recording studio, audio and video production control rooms, editing suites, student newsroom, media conversion room, graphics room, and "technology-enhanced" classrooms. BronxNet public access channel is also headquartered in Carman Hall, where many programs are produced including Bronx Talk and Open.

In 2012, Lehman dedicated its new $70 million Science Hall, a four-story building equipped with high-tech classrooms and laboratories, as well as a rooftop teaching and research greenhouse. In 2013, Science Hall was awarded a LEED platinum rating from the U.S. Green Building Council, the first CUNY building to earn the top green building rating. Leslie E. Robertson Associates (LERA) served as the structural engineers for this project.

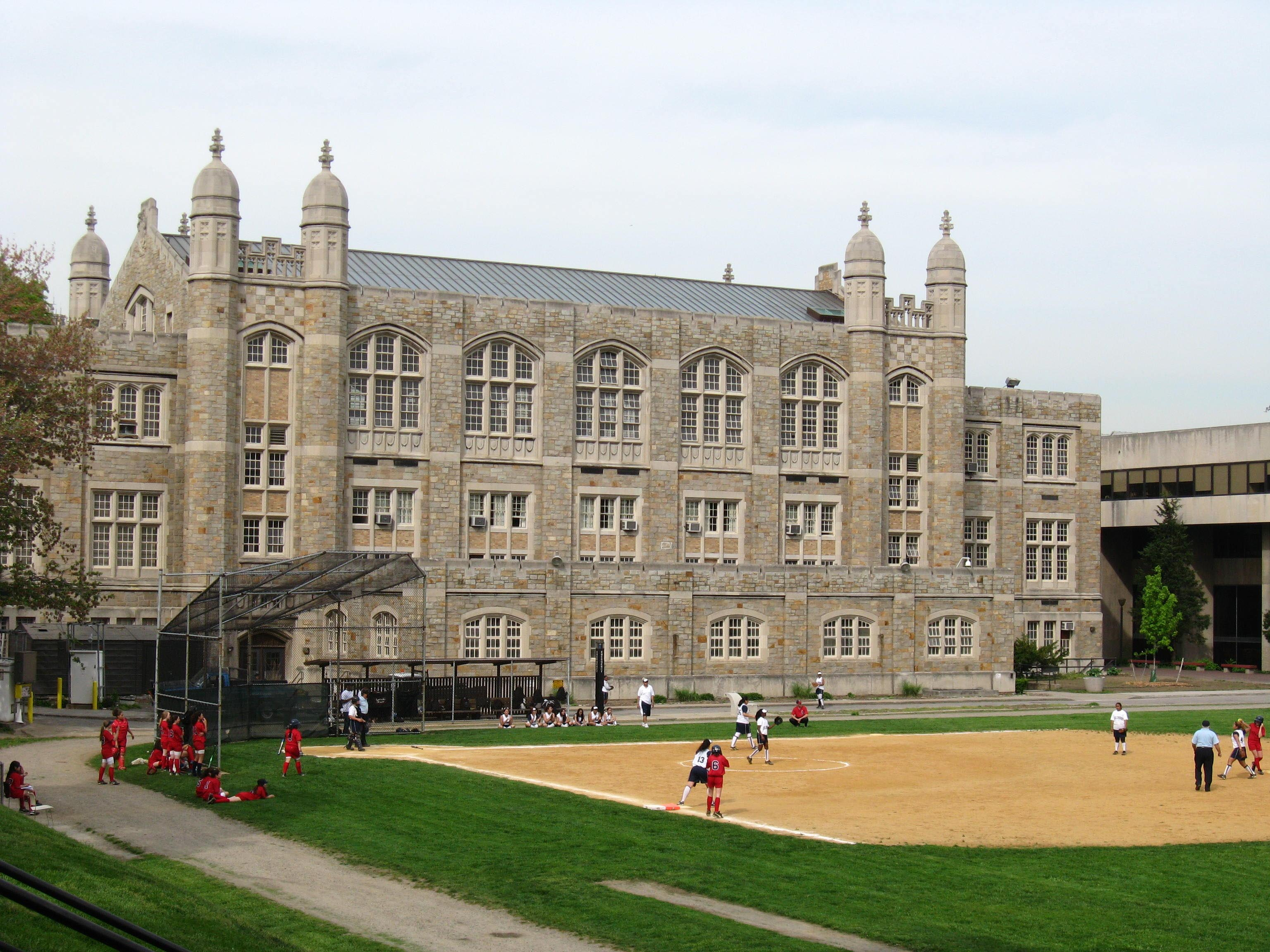
Old Gymnasium

The Lehman College Center for the Performing Arts is a professional theater which seats 2,310. The campus is also home to the Lehman College Art Gallery.

The Apex, Lehman College's post-modern style athletic and fitness facility, opened in 1994. Designed by architect Rafael Viñoly, the Apex stands in contrast to the original Gothic Revival buildings that define the campus.

In 2024, Lehman opened a new building dedicated to nursing. The $95 million building, designed by Urbahn Architects, is four stories high.

== Public transit access ==
The New York City Subway's Bedford Park Boulevard–Lehman College station, served by the 4 train, is located near the campus and is named for the college. The college can also be reached with the Bx10, Bx25, Bx26 or Bx28 bus.

== Student life ==
Undergraduate demographics as of fall 2023
Race and ethnicity	Total
Hispanic	57%
Black	27%
Asian	7%
White	4%
International student	3%
Two or more races	2%
Economic diversity
Low-income (Note: The percentage of students who received an income-based federal Pell grant intended for low-income students.)	63%
Affluent (Note: The percentage of students who are a part of the American middle class at the bare minimum.)	37%

Students at Lehman College are from multiple ethnic and racial identities, multiple language backgrounds, various social classes, and diverse sexual orientations with many international students.

Enrollment (2023–2024 academic year) of Lehman College:

- Undergraduates: 11,227
- Graduate students: 1,884
- Total: 13,111 students

== Academics ==
Lehman College is organized into six schools, plus the Macaulay Honors College. Lehman College offers undergraduate and graduate programs in its Schools of Arts & Humanities, School of Education, School of Natural and Social Sciences, School of Business, School of Health Sciences, Human Services, and Nursing, and School of Continuing Education.

=== Macaulay Honors College at Lehman ===
The highly selective Macaulay Honors College at Lehman provides a full tuition scholarship, Apple laptop computer, and opportunities fund of $7,500 that can be used for various activities such as study abroad, reimbursements for internships or research, and service learning. Students in the honors college are required to take 4 seminars relating to New York City, maintain a 3.5 grade point average, and graduate within four years. They also must take four Lehman Scholars Program Seminars, or "LSP"s.

=== Lehman Scholars Program ===
The Lehman Scholars Program is designed for capable and highly motivated students who have the desire and ability to pursue a somewhat more independent liberal arts course of study. The program includes special courses, seminars, and individual counseling. Students in the program are exempt from all of the normal degree requirements. They must, however, pass the CUNY Skills Assessment Tests to be admitted to the program and meet all course prerequisites and requirements for their major field.

=== College Now ===
The College Now program allows selected high school students to take college courses. The program is offered during the spring, summer and fall semesters and the courses are taught at the main Lehman campus.

=== Freshman Year Initiative ===
The Freshman Year Initiative is a program involving "blocks" of classes, similar to many high schools, which allows for new and first year students to get to know each other and become familiar with the college environment. All first-year students participate in the program, which promotes an interdisciplinary curriculum, faculty collaboration, and peer support. All students take mathematics and writing courses as well as a Freshman Seminar when they arrive to prepare them for the rest of their college courses.

== Research ==
=== Mexican Studies Institute at CUNY ===
The Mexican Studies Institute at CUNY includes faculty, students, staff, and community organizations focused on research, advocacy, and services related to Mexico and Mexicans in the U.S. Its goals are to create courses and programs across CUNY campuses, support Mexican and Mexican-American student success, host annual conferences and events on Mexican topics, and serve as a resource and hub for community-based organizations. The institute also provides internships, research assistantships, and service-learning opportunities for students with institutions serving New York City's Mexican population.

=== Institute for Irish-American Studies ===
The CUNY Institute for Irish-American Studies (IIAS): Located at Lehman College in the Bronx, New York, the IIAS is a research unit that supports scholars and students studying Irish and Irish American history, culture, and society. They offer public events, distance education courses, and publications.

=== CUNY Institute for Health Equity ===
The central aim of the City University of New York (CUNY) Institute for Health Equity (CIHE) is to coordinate research, teaching, service, and community engagement to eliminate health inequalities, reduce health disparities, and promote health.

== Athletics ==
Lehman College teams participate as a member of the National Collegiate Athletic Association's Division III. The Lightning Bugs are a member of the City University of New York Athletic Conference (CUNYAC). Men's sports include baseball, basketball, cross country, soccer, swimming & diving, track & field, tennis and volleyball; women's sports include basketball, cross country, soccer, softball, swimming & diving, tennis, track & field, volleyball, and cheerleading.

In 2012–13, the Lightning Bugs won CUNYAC Championships in men's swimming and diving and women's outdoor track and field. The school produced two All-Americans in women's outdoor track: Tobi Alli (100 m) and Jasmine Springer (triple jump).

=== Conference affiliations ===
- Eastern College Athletic Conference (ECAC)

== Notable faculty ==
There are nearly 400 full-time faculty. Notable faculty include:

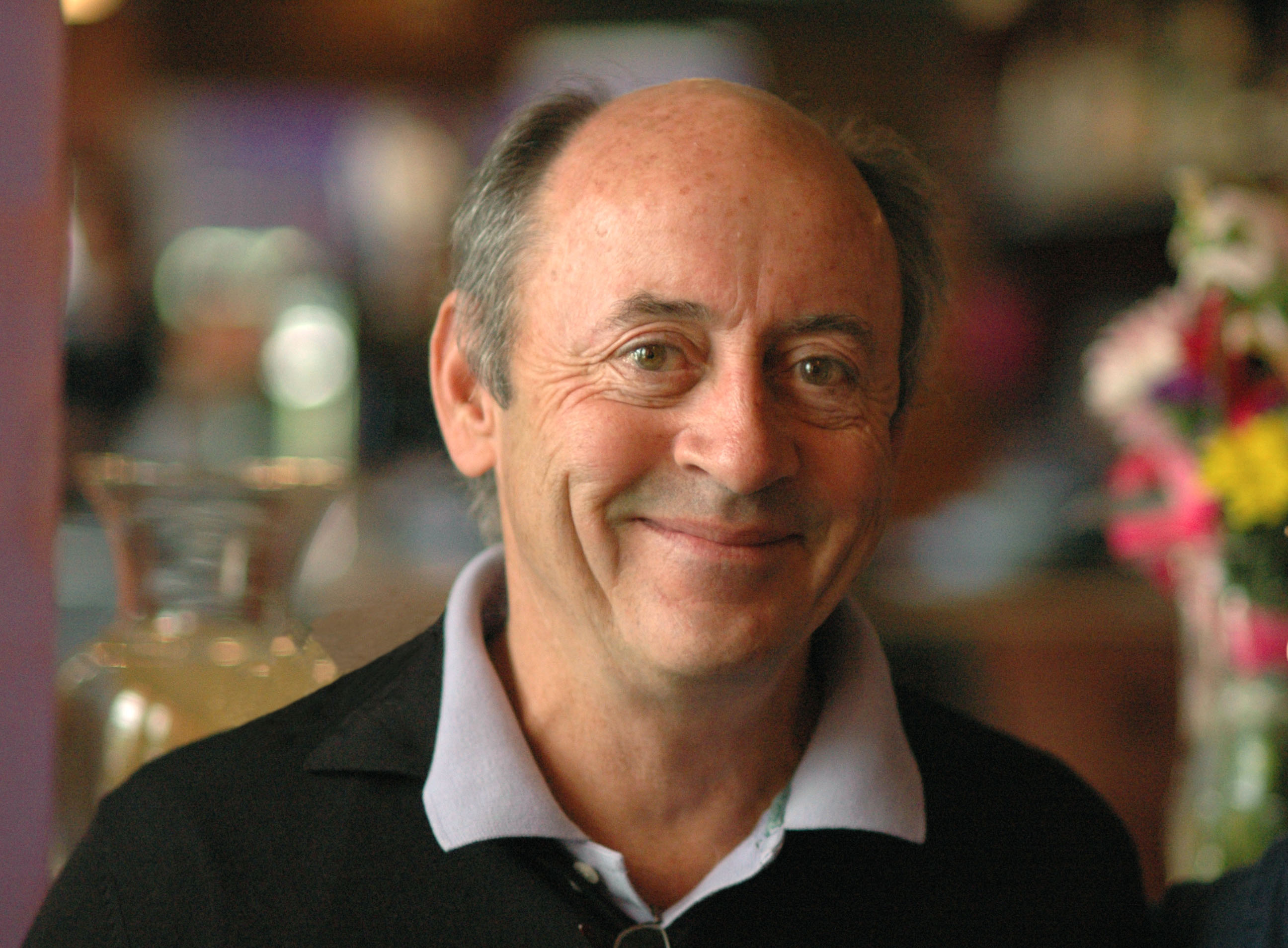
Billy Collins

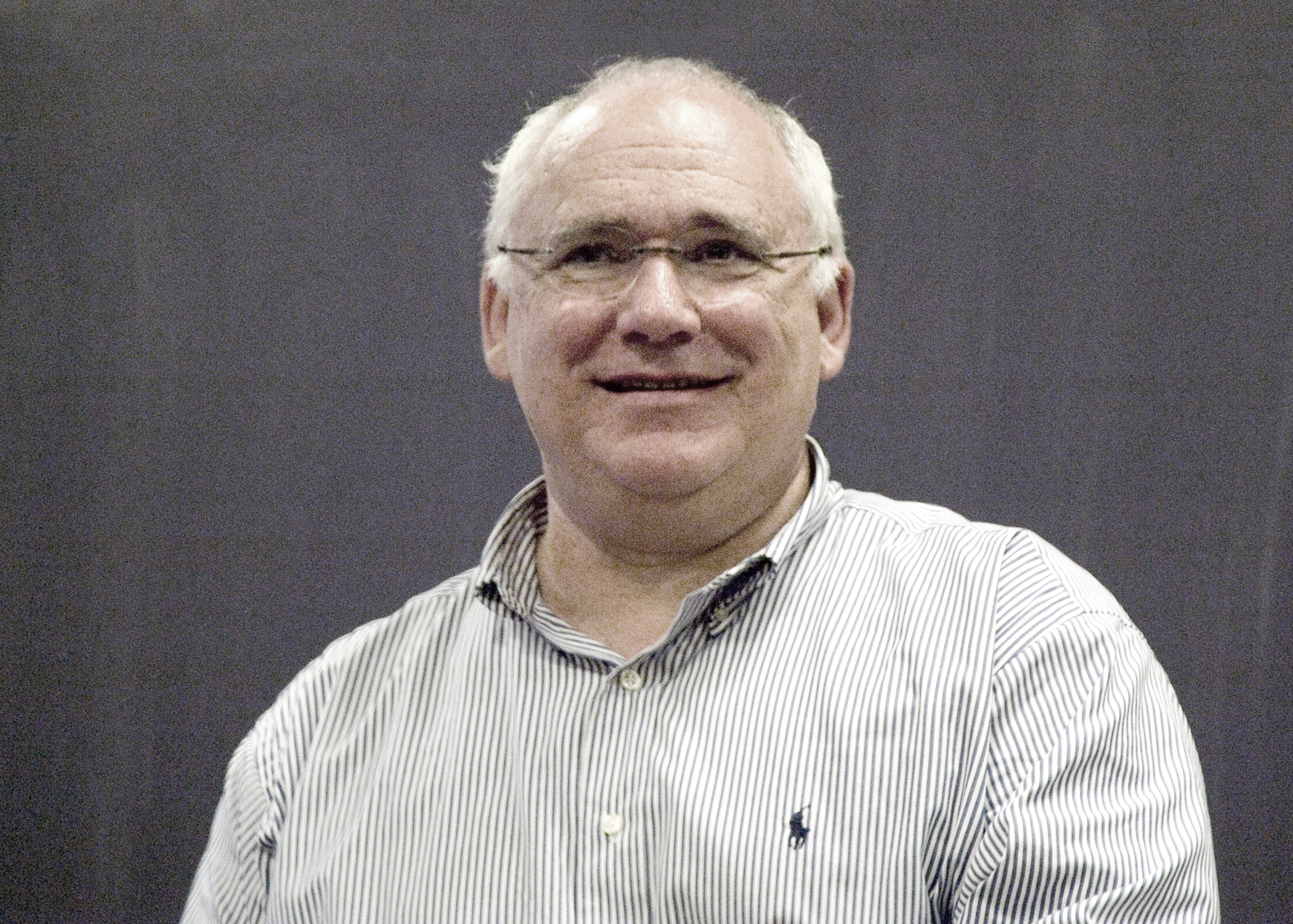
Melvyn B. Nathanson

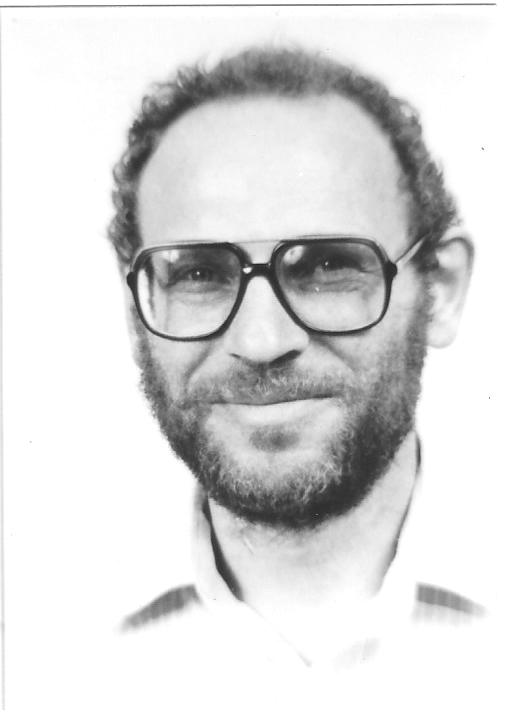
Victor Pan

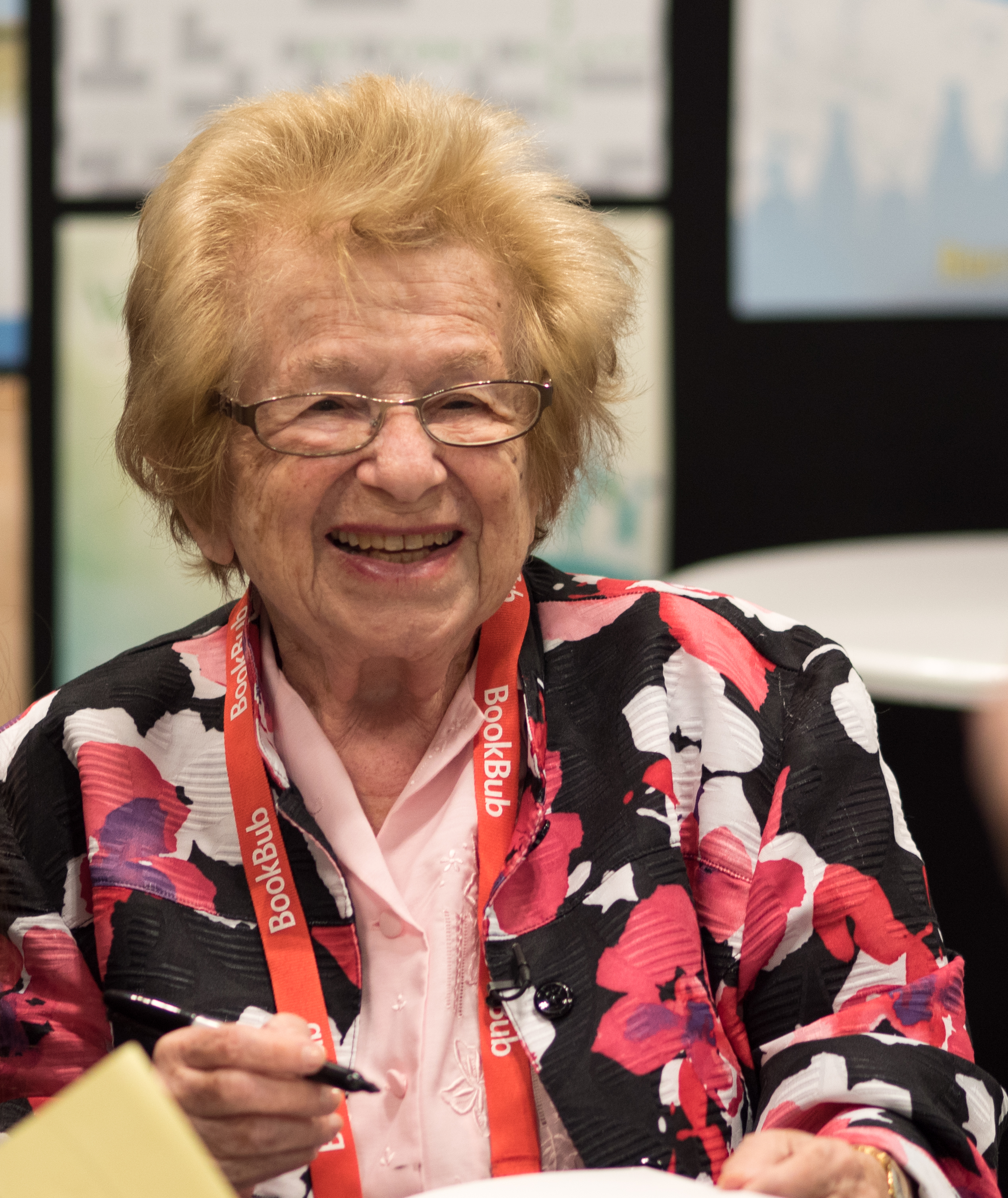
Dr. Ruth Westheimer

- Allison Amend (born 1974), professor of English, novelist, and short story writer
- Michael Bacon, associate professor of music, Lehman alumnus, and Emmy Award winning composer and songwriter; performs in the band the Bacon Brothers with his brother Kevin Bacon
- Jason Behrstock, professor of mathematics and computer science, Sloan Fellowship winner
- Laird W. Bergad, distinguished professor of Latin American and Puerto Rican studies
- Jerome Charyn, former professor of English, novelist, and film critic
- Eugene M. Chudnovsky, distinguished professor of physics
- Jane K. Cleland, lecturer in English
- Billy Collins, professor emeritus of English, United States Poet Laureate 2001–2003
- John Corigliano, distinguished professor emeritus of music, Academy Award winner
- María Teresa Babín Cortés, professor emeritus of Latin American and Latino studies
- Joseph W. Dauben, distinguished professor of history
- J. Yellowlees Douglas, former assistant professor of English
- Martin Duberman, distinguished professor emeritus of history
- May Mayko Ebihara, professor emerita of anthropology (in memoriam)
- Melvin Fitting, professor emeritus of mathematics and computer science
- J. E. Franklin, former lecturer in education
- Alyshia Gálvez, professor of Latin American and Latino studies
- Dmitry Garanin, Russian-American professor of physics
- Nancy Griffeth, professor of mathematics and computer science
- Michael Handel, professor of mathematics
- Nicholas Hanges, professor emeritus of mathematics (in memoriam)
- David Freeman Hawke, professor emeritus of history (in memoriam)
- William M. Hoffman, associate professor of theatre (in memoriam)
- Ulysses Kay, distinguished professor of music (in memoriam)
- Linda Keen, professor emerita of mathematics, Noether Lecturer
- Ádám Korányi, Hungarian-American distinguished professor emeritus of mathematics and computer science
- Thomas Kurtzman, professor of chemistry
- William Latimer, professor of health sciences
- Robert Lekachman, distinguished professor emeritus of economics (in memoriam)
- John L. Locke, professor of language science
- Ursula Meyer, professor emerita of sculpture (in memoriam)
- Margot Mifflin (born 1960), professor of English
- Joan Miller, former professor of dance and founder of the dance program
- Melvyn B. Nathanson, professor of mathematics
- Matt O'Dowd, associate professor of astrophysics
- Victor Pan, distinguished professor of mathematics and computer science
- Sondra Perl, professor emerita of English
- Shauneille Perry, former associate professor and director of theatre
- Richard Popkin, distinguished professor emeritus of philosophy (in memoriam)
- Lawrence Raphael, professor emeritus of speech science
- Stanley Renshon, professor of political science
- Marjorie Rosen, professor of journalism, communication, and theatre
- Rob Schneiderman, professor of mathematics
- Raymond Smullyan, distinguished professor emeritus of mathematics and philosophy (in memoriam)
- Marilyn Sokol (born 1944), distinguished lecturer of theatre
- Christina Sormani, professor of mathematics
- Katherine St. John, professor of mathematics and computer science
- Dannielle Tegeder, professor of art
- Patricia Thompson (born Yelena Vladimirovna Mayakovskaya), professor of philosophy and women's studies (in memoriam)
- Annita Tuller, professor emerita of mathematics and computer science (in memoriam)
- Joseph Tusiani, professor emeritus of languages and literature (in memoriam)
- Concetta M. Tomaino, adjunct professor of music
- Lloyd Ultan, former adjunct professor of history
- Ruth Westheimer (born Karola Siegel, 1928; known as "Dr. Ruth"), German-American sex therapist, talk show host, author, professor, Holocaust survivor, and former Haganah sniper
- Eric Wolf, former distinguished professor of anthropology
- Eleanore Wurtzel, professor of biology, AAAS fellow
- Naomi Zack, professor of philosophy

== Notable alumni ==
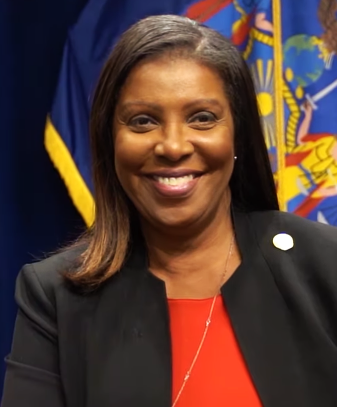
Letitia James

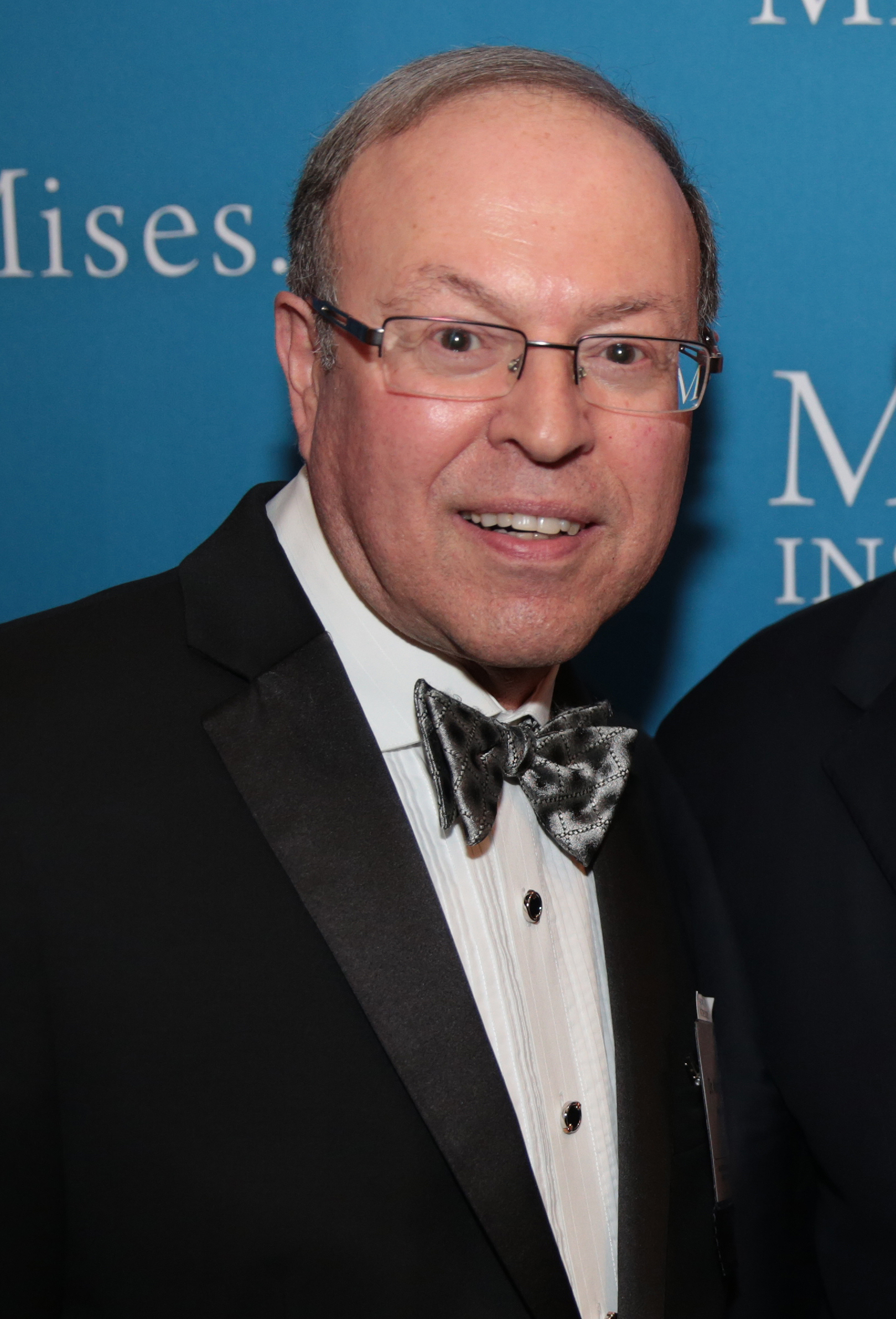
Murray Sabrin

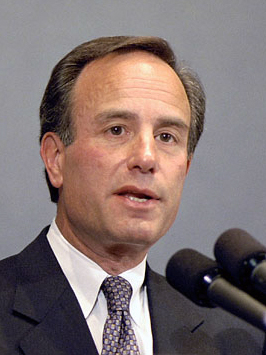
Ivan Seidenberg

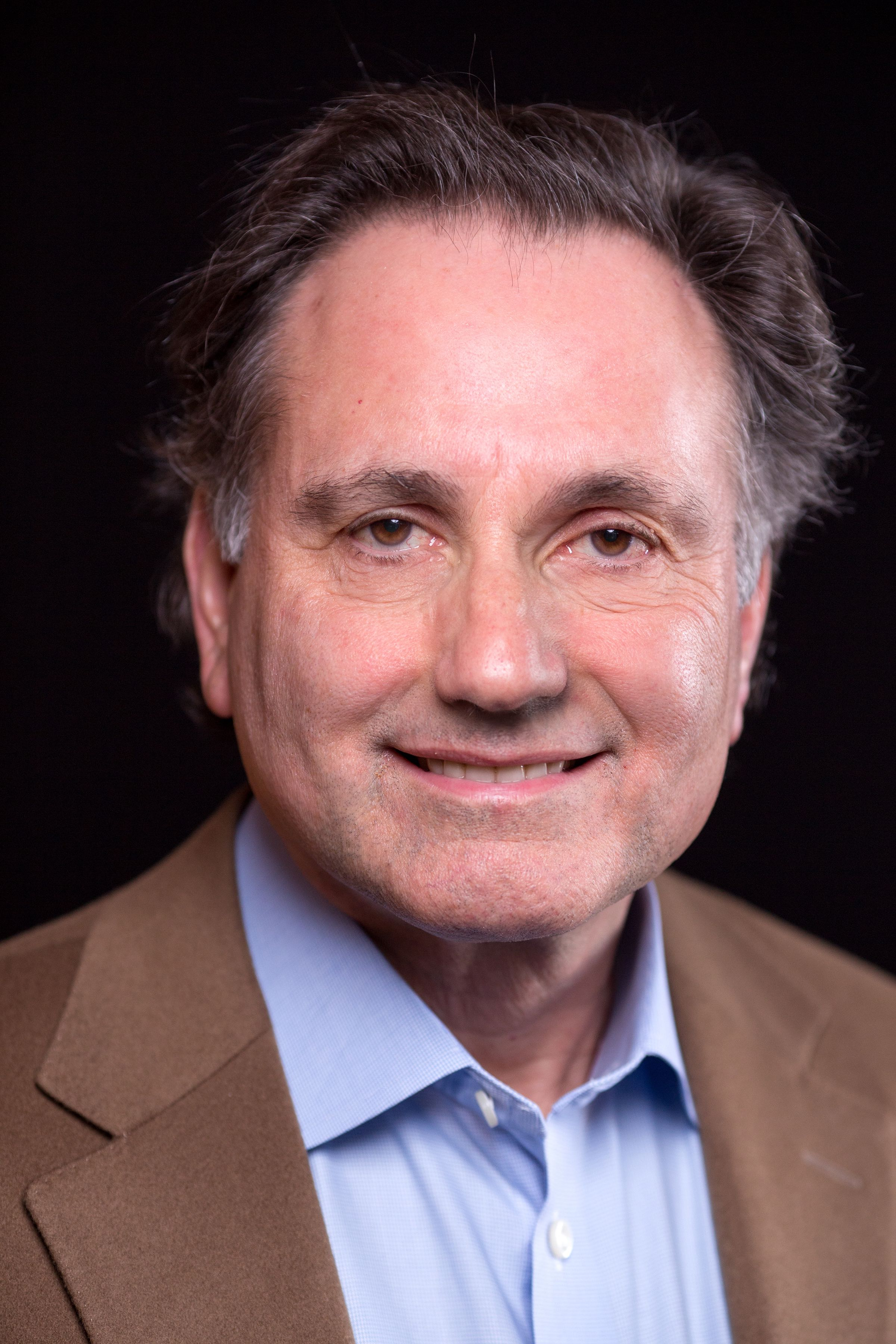
David L. Spector

- André Aciman, writer, author of Call Me by Your Name, and professor at CUNY Graduate Center
- Debo Adegbile, commissioner for the United States Civil Rights Commission
- Andrea Apolo, medical oncologist and researcher at the National Cancer Institute
- Gary Axelbank, journalist, disk jockey and TV personality based in the Bronx
- Diana Ayala, politician, New York City Council member for the 8th district and deputy speaker of the New York City Council
- Michael Bacon, Emmy Award-winning composer and songwriter, and associate professor of music at Lehman College; performs in the band the Bacon Brothers with his brother Kevin Bacon
- Jacqueline Bishop, writer, visual artist and photographer from Jamaica and a professor at New York University
- Steven Contursi, businessman and numismatist
- Blondell Cummings, modern dancer and choreographer
- Rubén Díaz Jr., borough president of the Bronx in New York City 2009–2021
- Rubén Díaz Sr., member of the Democratic Party; represented the 32nd district in the New York State Senate 2003–2017
- Jeffrey Dinowitz, politician who represents District 81 in the New York State Assembly
- Brandon M. Easton, professional writer, screenwriter, and educator
- Christopher Emdin, professor in the Department of Mathematics, Science, and Technology at Teachers College, Columbia University
- Eliot Engel, U.S. representative for New York's 16th congressional district (1989–2021)
- Oswald Feliz, councilmember representing District 15 of New York City
- Ailene Fields, sculptor and stone-carving teacher
- Nabie Foday Fofanah, Guinean sprinter, also known as the Speed Doctor
- Philip Foglia, prosecutor and Italian American civic rights activist
- John Fox, former novelist and short-story writer
- Joe Foy, Major League Baseball third baseman
- Eve Franklin, Democratic, represented Great Falls in the Montana Senate 1991–2002, served in the Montana House of Representatives 2003–2007
- Lewis Gordon, philosopher, works in Africana philosophy, philosophy of human and life sciences, and phenomenology
- Micki Grant, singer (soprano), actress, writer, and composer
- Lowell Hawthorne, Jamaican businessman, founder of Golden Krust Caribbean Bakery & Grill
- Andre Harrell, founder of Uptown Records, president/CEO of Motown Records, and the first half of the hip hop duo Dr. Jeckyll & Mr. Hyde
- Ramona Hernández, community leader, sociologist and historian, professor of Sociology at the City College of New York, and director of the CUNY Dominican Studies Institute
- Letitia James, attorney general of New York since 2018
- Janet Kaplan, poet and professor
- Matt Kilcullen, director of athletics at Mercy College
- Woodie King Jr., theatre and film director and producer and founding director of the New Federal Theatre in New York City
- Jeffrey R. Korman, politician who was a member of the New York State Senate (33rd District) 1990–1992
- Graig Kreindler, painter and illustrator
- Sabor Latino, hip hop artist and author
- Don Leicht, visual artist who has worked as a painter and sculptor in the Bronx
- Robert McCullough, former basketball player
- Kenney Mencher, painter and associate professor of art and art history at Ohlone College
- Steve Mirsky, writer for Scientific American and the host of the magazine's weekly science podcast, Science Talk
- Jacqueline Moody, writer, editor, and producer, and founder and chief executive of YadaYadaCo
- Devon J. Moore, poet and author
- Jenn Morel, Dominican singer and songwriter
- Pepón Osorio, Latino artist
- Ron Perlman, actor and voice actor, best known for playing the comic book character Hellboy in both Hellboy (2004) and its sequel Hellboy II: The Golden Army (2008), and Clay Morrow on the television series Sons of Anarchy (2008–2013)
- Richard Rakowski, entrepreneur, investor, and health care and energy consultant
- Christopher "Kid" Reid, actor, comedian and former rapper, formerly known as Kid (shortened from his original MC name, Kid Coolout)
- Elizabeth Rodriguez, Puerto Rican actress who plays Aleida Diaz in the Netflix series Orange Is the New Black (2013–2019)
- Ediberto Roman, professor of law at Florida International University College of Law
- Jimmy Rowser, jazz double-bassist
- Murray Sabrin, professor of finance at Ramapo College and candidate for US Senate in 2018
- Abdel R. Salaam, choreographer, director, producer, mentor, and educator, and co-founder and director of Forces of Nature Dance Theatre
- Davi Santos, Brazilian-born actor best known for playing Sir Ivan, the Gold Ranger on the television series Power Rangers Dino Charge
- Ivan Seidenberg, former chairman and CEO of Verizon Communications Inc.
- José Enrique Serrano, member of the United States House of Representatives since 1990
- David L. Spector, cell and molecular biologist and professor at Cold Spring Harbor Laboratory (CSHL) and head of the Gene Regulation and Cell Proliferation program of the CSHL Cancer Center
- Bob Stewart, jazz tuba player
- Andrea Stewart-Cousins, Democrat who represents District 35 in the New York State Senate
- Andrea Stone, journalist and until 2019, the director of career services of the CUNY Graduate School of Journalism (later the Craig Newmark Graduate School of Journalism)
- Theodore Swetz, actor, theatre director, and educator and head of acting at UMKC Theatre at the University of Missouri-Kansas City
- Al Taylor, Democrat and assembly member for the 71st District of the New York State Assembly
- Michelle Tokarczyk, author, poet, and literary critic and a professor of English and former co-director of the writing program at Goucher College
- Celines Toribio, Dominican actress, model, and Spanish-speaking television personality
- Julius Penson Williams, African-American composer, conductor, and professor at the Berklee College of Music in Boston
- Karen Yu (born 1992), professional wrestler, also known as "Karen Q" and "Wendy Choo"
