= Nicholas Hanges =

American mathematician (died 2019)

Nicholas William Hanges
- Born: October 5, 1949
- Died: July 20, 2019
- Citizenship: United States
- Education: City College of New York (B.S.); Purdue University (M.S., Ph.D.)
- Known for: Partial differential equations
- Spouse: Carol Hanges
- Awards: Alfred P. Sloan Fellow
- Scientific career
- Fields: Mathematics
- Workplaces: Lehman College
- Thesis: "Parametrices And Local Solvability For A Class Of Singular Hyperbolic Operators" (1976)
- Doctoral advisor: M. Salah Baouendi

Nicholas William Hanges (October 5, 1949 – July 20, 2019) was a mathematician and professor at Lehman College of the City University of New York, known for his work in partial differential equations and the theory of several complex variables.

== Education and career ==
Hanges earned his B.S degree in mathematics from the New York City College in 1970. He received his M.A. (1975) and Ph.D. (1976) from Purdue University, under the supervision of M. Salah Baouendi. He was a visiting scholar at the Institute for Advanced Study in 1977–1978, 1980–1981, 1991-1992 and again in 1994. In 1983, Hanges joined the faculty of Lehman College of the City University of New York as a professor of mathematics from the University of Pittsburgh. From 2017 he served as Chairman of the Mathematics Department.

== Awards and honors ==
- In 1982, Hanges received an Alfred P. Sloan Research Fellowship.

== Selected publications ==
- Hanges, Nicholas (1990). "Explicit formulas for the Szegö kernel for some domains in C^{2}". Journal of Functional Analysis. 88 (1): 153–165. doi:10.1016/0022-1236(90)90123-3.
- Hanges, Nicholas (2004). "Analytic regularity for an operator with Treves curves". Journal of Functional Analysis. 210 (2): 295–320. doi:10.1016/j.jfa.2003.12.006.
- Cordaro, Paulo D.; Hanges, Nicholas (2009). "Hyperfunctions and (analytic) hypoellipticity". Mathematische Annalen. 344 (2): 329–339. doi:10.1007/s00208-008-0308-2. MR 2495773. S2CID 121525806.
- Cordaro, Paulo D.; Hanges, Nicholas (2009). "A new proof of Okaji's theorem for a class of sum of squares operators". Annales de l'Institut Fourier. 59 (2): 595–619. doi:10.5802/aif.2442. MR 2521430.
- Cordaro, Paulo D.; Hanges, Nicholas (2012). "Hypoellipticity in spaces of ultradistributions—Study of a model case". Israel Journal of Mathematics. 191 (2): 771–789. doi:10.1007/s11856-012-0011-6. MR 3011496. S2CID 255398748.
