= Janet Kaplan =

American poet and professor (born 1958)

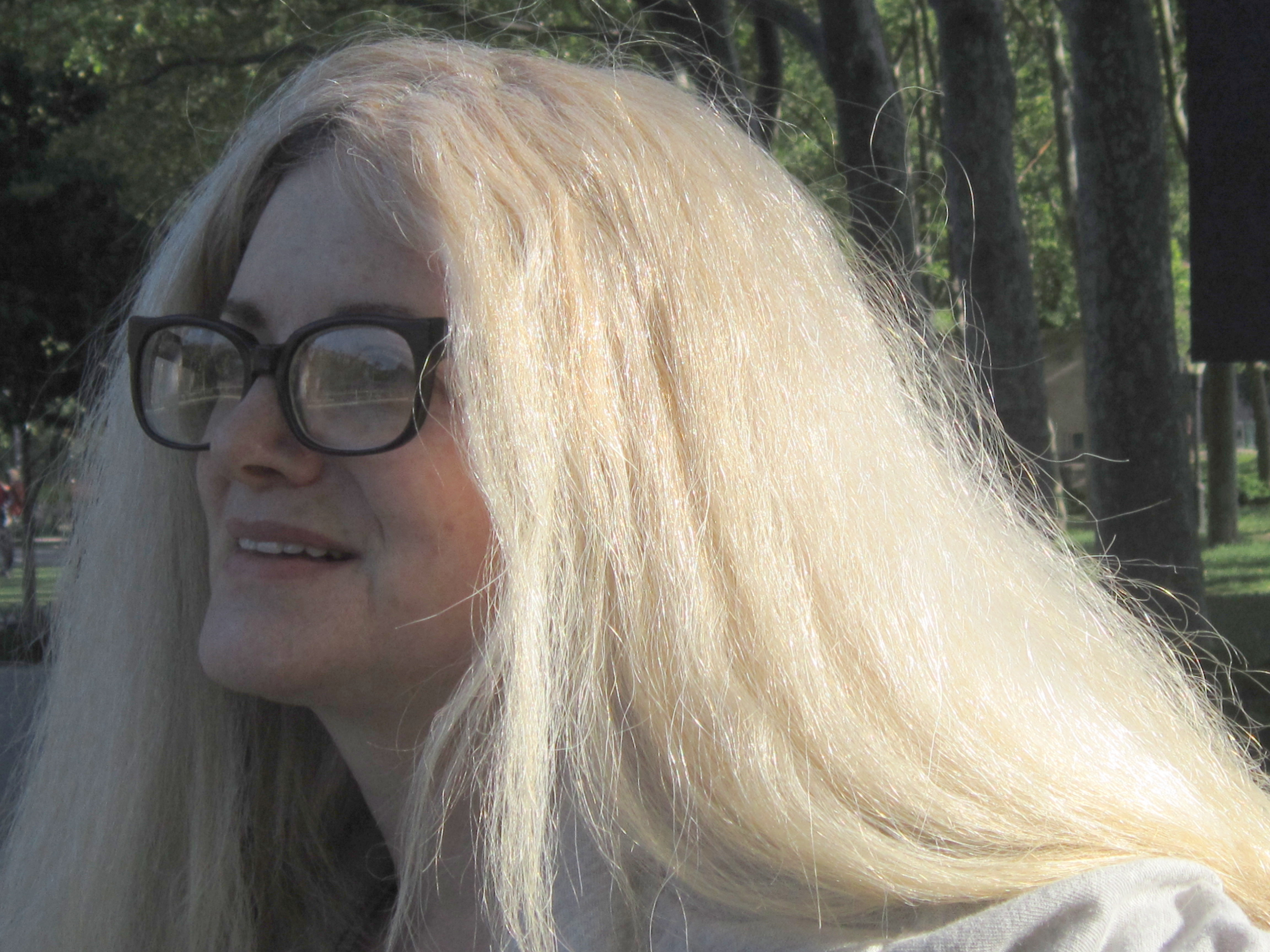
- Born: 1958 (age 67–68)
- Education: Lehman College; Columbia University; Sarah Lawrence College (MFA)
- Occupations: Poet; professor

Janet Kaplan (born 1958) is an American poet and professor. She is the author of four full-length books: The Groundnote (Alice James Books, 1997), "The Glazier’s County," winner of the 2003 Poets Out Loud Prize from Fordham University Press, Dreamlife of the Philanthropist: Prose Poems & Prose Sonnets, winner of the 2011 Ernest Sandeen Prize (University of Notre Dame Press), and "Ecotones" (Eyewear Ltd., forthcoming 2021).

Her honors include fellowships at Yaddo, The Virginia Center for Creative Arts, and the Ragdale Foundation in Illinois. She has received the Bronx Council on the Arts’ BRIO award for Excellence in Poetry and a New York Foundation for the Arts Fellowship in Poetry. In 2011, her limited edition chapbook, Ascending Descending (BroBroo Books), was adapted to the opera in a soprano song cycle by Martin Hennessy.

== Education ==
Kaplan attended Lehman College and Columbia University. She earned her MFA from Sarah Lawrence College.

== Career ==
For several years, Kaplan worked as Poet in Residence at Fordham University. She currently teaches poetry and creative writing at Hofstra University, where she edits AMP, an international digital literary magazine. From 2011 to 2015 she edited, designed, and published Red Glass Books, a small press with titles from Kate Greenstreet, Edwin Torres, Margaret Diehl, and Patricia Spears Jones, among others.
