= Eve Franklin =

American politician

Member of the Montana Senate
- In office 1991–2003

Member of the Montana House of Representatives from the 24th district
- In office 2003–2007
- Succeeded by: Steve Bolstad

Personal details
- Born: August 14, 1954 (age 72) New York, U.S.
- Party: Democratic Party
- Education: Lehman College, Gonzaga University

Eve Franklin (born August 14, 1954) is an American Democratic politician from Montana. She served as a member of the Montana Senate, representing Great Falls from 1991 through 2003, and then as a member of the Montana House of Representatives from 2003 to 2007. A registered nurse, she then served as a state mental health ombudsman and Governor Brian Schweitzer's Health Policy Advisor.
