= Margot Mifflin =

American author

- Born: September 12, 1960 (age 66); Swarthmore, Pennsylvania
- Occupations: Book author, freelance journalist, professor, lecturer
- Website: margotmifflin.com

Margot Mifflin is an American author and journalist who has written for The New York Times, ARTnews, The New Yorker, Entertainment Weekly, Elle Magazine, The Chronicle of Higher Education, The Los Angeles Review of Books, and other publications.

Mifflin holds an M.A. in journalism from New York University and a B.A. in English from Occidental College in Los Angeles, where she was friends with Barack Obama, an experience she has written about for The New Yorker and The New York Times. In 1982 she was awarded a Thomas J. Watson Fellowship to study the role of dreams in creativity.

She is a professor in the English Department of Lehman College (City University of New York).

Her book Bodies of Subversion: A Secret History of Women and Tattoo became the first history of women's tattoo art when it was released in 1997. A third edition was published in 2013. The Blue Tattoo: The Life of Olive Oatman, was a finalist for the 2010 Caroline Bancroft History Prize. Looking for Miss America: A Pageant's 100-Year Quest to Define Womanhood won the Popular Culture Association’s 2021 Best Book in Women’s Studies Award.

== Bibliography ==
- Bodies of Subversion: A Secret History of Women and Tattoo. Juno Books, 1997. ISBN 1-890451-00-2; Powerhouse Books, 2001, 2013, 978-157687-613-8.
- The Blue Tattoo: The Life of Olive Oatman. University of Nebraska Press, 2009. ISBN 0-8032-1148-1; Bison Books (paperback) 978-0-8032-1148-3.
- Looking for Miss America: A Pageant's 100-Year Quest to Define Womanhood, 2020. 978-1640092235; Counterpoint Press.
