= David L. Spector =

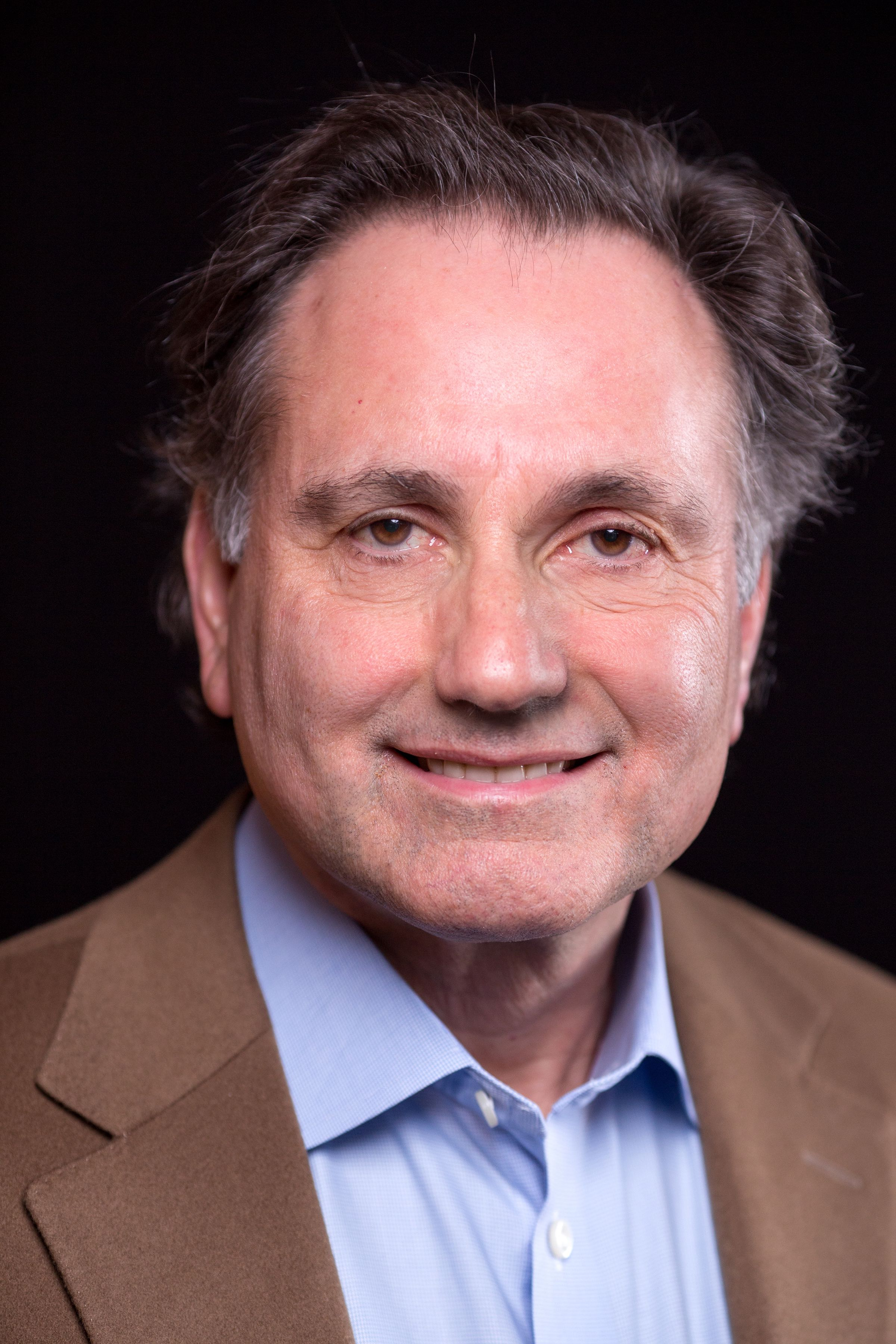
- Born: December 6, 1952; New York City, New York
- Education: City College of New York, Herbert H. Lehman College, Rutgers University
- Awards: Alumni Achievement Award, Herbert H. Lehman College, New York; Elected Member, American Academy of Arts & Sciences; Elected Associate Foreign Member, European Molecular Biology Organization; Rutgers 250 Fellow
- Scientific career
- Fields: Cell biology, Molecular biology
- Workplaces: Cold Spring Harbor Laboratory

David L. Spector (born December 6, 1952) is a cell and molecular biologist best recognized for his research on gene expression and nuclear dynamics. He is currently a professor at Cold Spring Harbor Laboratory (CSHL). From 2007 to 2023, he served as Director of Research of CSHL.

== Education and faculty positions ==
Spector was born in New York City. He received a Bachelor of Science degree from City College of New York in 1973, a master's degree from Herbert H. Lehman College in 1977, and a Ph.D.in cell biology from Rutgers University in 1980. After completing his Ph.D. he accepted a position as assistant professor in the Department of Pharmacology at Baylor College of Medicine in Houston, Texas. In 1985 he relocated to Cold Spring Harbor Laboratory and has been promoted through the ranks to his current position of professor. In 2007 he was appointed director of research.

== Professional activities ==
Spector is a pioneer in unraveling our understanding of the inner workings of the cell nucleus. His early investigations centered on the unusual chromosome structure of dinoflagellates. Recent studies in his laboratory are focused on examining the organization and regulation of gene expression in living mammalian cells. His laboratory has developed approaches to elucidate the spatial and temporal aspects of gene expression and in identifying and characterizing the function of nuclear retained long non-coding RNAs.

His most seminal research accomplishments include the direct visualization in living cells of the recruitment of factors involved in gene expression to active genes; the development of a biochemical fractionation approach to purify a sub-nuclear domain (nuclear speckles) and characterize its protein constituents; the development of a live cell imaging system to visualize a stably integrated genetic locus and follow in real-time its mRNA and protein products; the elucidation of a rapid-response mechanism of regulating gene expression through RNA nuclear retention; identification of a mechanism by which a single genetic locus can produce a long nuclear retained non-coding RNA and a small cytoplasmic tRNA-like transcript, the identification and characterization of a long nuclear retained non-coding RNA that is involved in organizing a sub-nuclear organelle (paraspeckles), and determining that knockout or knockdown of the lncRNA Malat1 results in the differentiation of mammary tumors and a significant reduction in metastasis.

In addition, Spector has co-edited numerous microscopy techniques manuals (i.e. Basic Methods in Microscopy, Live Cell Imaging: A Laboratory Manual), and a treatise of The Nucleus, that are used in laboratories throughout the world.

== Honors and awards ==
- 1973: City College of New York, Bedesem Award in Biology
- 2006: Winship Herr Award for Excellence in Teaching, Watson School of Biological Sciences, Cold Spring Harbor Laboratory.
- 2009-2012: Council Member, The American Society for Cell Biology.
- Since 2010: Robert B. Gardner Jr. Professor, Cold Spring Harbor Laboratory.
- 2012: Alumni Achievement Award, Herbert H. Lehman College, New York.
- 2014: Elected Member, American Academy of Arts & Sciences
- 2014: Elected Associate Member, European Molecular Biology Organization
- 2016: Rutgers 250 Fellow
- 2017: Elected Fellow, The American Society for Cell Biology, Lifetime Fellow Recognition for Distinguished Contributions to the Advancement of Cell Biology
