= Jacob Lief =

Jacob Lief is an internationally recognized social entrepreneur, author, and Founder and CEO of Ubuntu Pathways, a nonprofit organization based in Port Elizabeth, South Africa that breaks the cycle of poverty by providing vulnerable children with a holistic support system of education, healthcare, and social services.

== Early years ==
In 1989, Lief's family moved to London where he studied at the American School in London. He went on to attend the University of Pennsylvania, where he first became interested in South Africa and international development. In 1994, Lief visited South Africa to observe the country's transition to democracy. The experience had a profound impact on him, and when he returned to the US, he knew he wanted to become part of “the new South Africa.”

In 1997, Lief returned to South Africa. He met Malizole “Banks” Gwaxula, a South African school teacher in a local shebeen in Port Elizabeth. Bonding over their shared passion for education, they founded Ubuntu Education Fund (renamed Ubuntu Pathways in 2017) to create equal educational opportunities for township children in Port Elizabeth.

== Career ==
Soon after they began working in Port Elizabeth, Lief and Gwaxula realized they needed to pivot the mission to focus on the deeper issues affecting poverty. Today, Ubuntu's mission has significantly expanded into a holistic approach, aimed at providing South Africa's most vulnerable children with comprehensive education, health, and social support from birth/infancy to adulthood.

This change spurred the organization's growth, pushing Ubuntu from its broom-closet origins to its position as an internationally recognized organization with offices on three continents. The organization recently launched the Ubuntu Advisory, a global consultancy practice that leverages the Ubuntu Model to help others achieve social impact.

Lief's autobiography, I Am Because You Are, chronicles his journey as a young founder and his struggles to establish a quality nonprofit in post-apartheid South Africa. His vision has set forth what has been heralded as “a new, bold vision for breaking the cycle of poverty” (Rodale Inc, 2015).

== Recognition/Awards ==
In 2016, Lief appeared in Fortune Magazine’s ‘40 Under 40’ list of the most influential young people in business.

Lief was a lecturer at the University of Pennsylvania’s School of Social Policy and a visiting fellow at the University's new global policy research center, Perry World House. He was also the host of Philanthropy Unfiltered, a collaboration with the Center for High Impact Philanthropy at the University of Pennsylvania.

Lief serves as a member of the Clinton Global Initiative Advisory Committee, was named one of the world's 101 Most Innovative Visionaries at the Decide Now Act Summit, has been recognized by the World Economic Forum as a Young Global Leader, and was selected as an Aspen Institute Global Fellow.

Jacob Lief has published in The Guardian, The Huffington Post, Fast Company, Devex, Mic, and Forbes.

== Personal ==
Jacob is married to Lindsay Lief, a physician at Weill-Cornell, and together they have two sons. He divides his time between Port Elizabeth, South Africa and New York City, United States.
