= Matt O'Dowd (astrophysicist) =

Australian astrophysicist (b. 1973)

- Born: Matthew John O'Dowd; January 5, 1973 (age 53); Australia
- Education: University of Melbourne (BSc, PhD)
- Occupation: Astrophysicist
- Employer: Lehman College (City University of New York)
- Known for: PBS Space Time

Matthew John O'Dowd is an Australian astrophysicist. He is an associate professor in the Physics and Astronomy Department at the Lehman College of the City University of New York and the writer and host of PBS Space Time. He is a frequent guest on Science Goes to the Movies on CUNY TV and on StarTalk radio with Neil deGrasse Tyson.

== Education ==
O’Dowd attended the University of Melbourne, beginning his Bachelor's in Science in 1992 and concluding in 1994 with a major in physics. In 1995, he completed his First Class Honours in physics. In 2003, he completed his Ph.D. in astronomy and astrophysics between the University of Melbourne and the Space Telescope Science Institute in Baltimore, under Johns Hopkins University, with his thesis, titled: 'The Host Galaxies of Radio-loud AGN'.

== Career ==
O'Dowd is an associate professor in the Physics and Astronomy Department at the Lehman College of the City University of New York. He is a staff scientist at the American Museum of Natural History. Since 2015, he has been the writer and host of PBS Space Time, a video series by PBS Digital Studios. O'Dowd is a crew member of Black Rock Observatory, a mobile observatory that debuted at Burning Man in 2012.
