= William Latimer (epidemiologist) =

American infectious disease epidemiologist

William W. Latimer
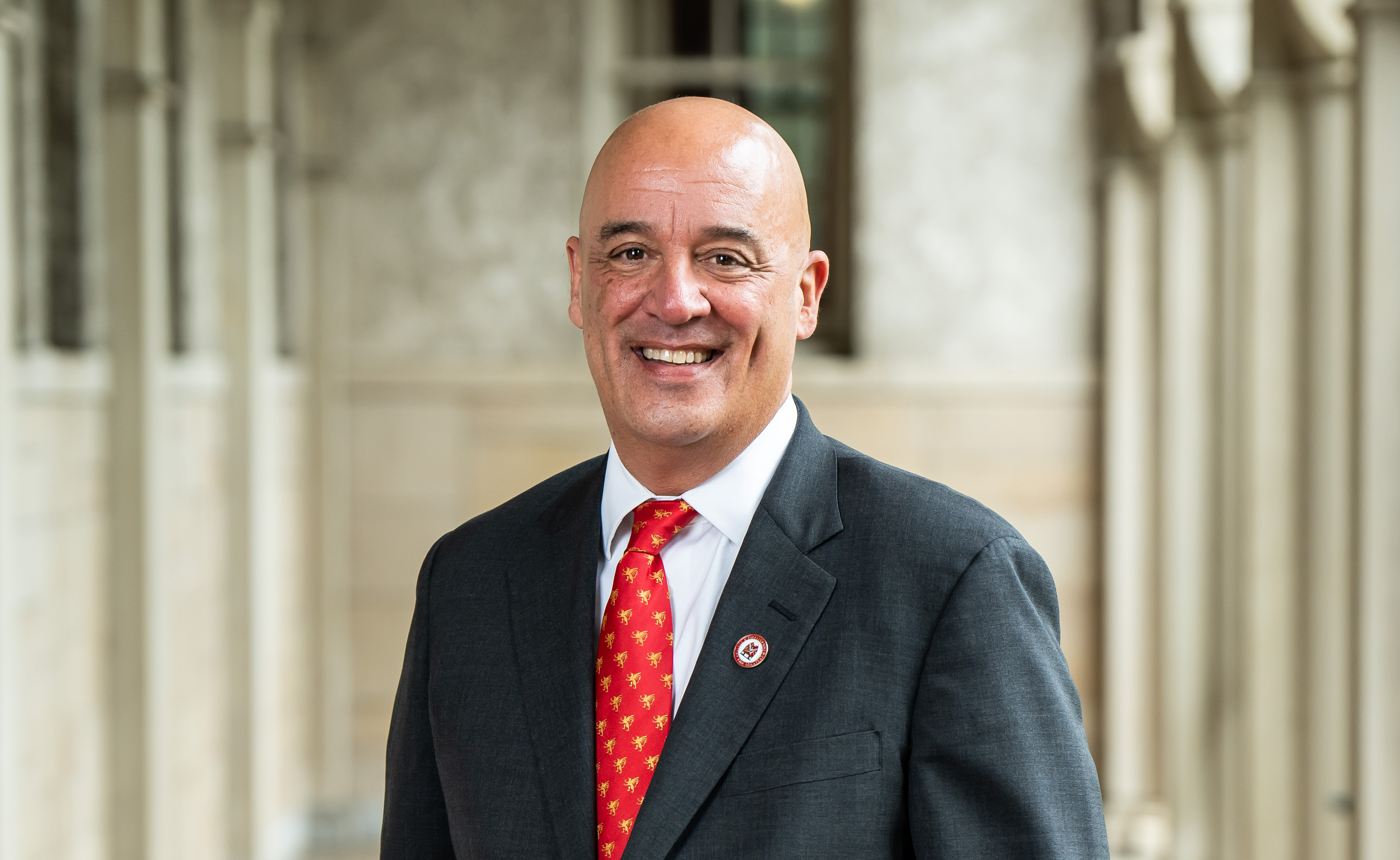
- Dr. William W. Latimer
- Born: Schenectady, New York
- Education: Hobart College; Columbia University; University of Minnesota; University of Rhode Island
- Known for: Infection Epidemiology; Behavioral Interventions; Academic Achievement
- Scientific career
- Fields: Epidemiology; Psychology
- Workplaces: Chestnut Hill College; Mercy University; The College of New Rochelle; Lehman College, CUNY; University of Florida; Johns Hopkins University

William W. Latimer is an infectious disease epidemiologist and academic administrator. He recently served as the 7th President of Chestnut Hill College in Philadelphia, Pennsylvania and previously served as the 14th President of the College of New Rochelle.

== Early life and education ==
Latimer was born in Schenectady, New York, in 1963. He graduated magna cum laude, Phi Beta Kappa from Hobart and William Smith Colleges in 1985 with a double major in English and psychology, having studied American literature with John Lydenberg. During his Master's education at Columbia University he was introduced to cognitive and educational psychology by Dr. Joanna Williams, which was to partially shape his NIH-funded research in later years focusing on the development of cognitive executive functions to promote health equity and resilience in vulnerable populations. He received his Ph.D. in clinical psychology from the University of Rhode Island (1993), completed his internship at Albany Medical College with Mike Nichols, Ph.D. (1993), a post-doctoral fellowship in the Division of Pediatrics and Adolescent Health at the University of Minnesota Children's Hospital, and a Master's in Public Health in epidemiology from the University of Minnesota (2000).

== Academic career ==
Latimer completed his post-doctoral training in adolescent health at the University of Minnesota Children's Hospital, Division of Pediatrics and Adolescent Health (1993-1995) which culminated in a Scientist Development Award from the National Institutes of Health (NIH). He was research associate at the University of Minnesota, Institute on Community Integration, College of Education and Human Development (1995-2000). He then served as both an assistant and associate Professor of Mental Health at the Johns Hopkins Bloomberg School of Public Health (2000-2011) where he led as PI multiple NIH research project grants (R01), an NIH Institutional Training Grant in Epidemiology, and a U.S. State Department funded Humphrey Fellowship Program. He was the inaugural Elizabeth Faulk Chair of Clinical and Health Psychology at the University of Florida, College of Public Health and Health Professions from 2011-2014 where his leadership team eliminated a significant departmental budget deficit in part by increasing net revenue of the psychology clinic and establishing new collaborative partnerships that provided faculty research support.

From 2014 to 2018, he was the Founding Dean of the School of Health Sciences, Human Services and Nursing, at Lehman College, City University of New York, where his leadership team increased enrollment by 23% while simultaneously increasing graduation rates by 16% largely among first generation college students and students of color. He was appointed the 14th President of The College of New Rochelle on April 15, 2018. His leadership team graduated 1200 students at the 2019 commencement, representing a 33% increase from the prior year.

Latimer was named the Vice President of the Bronx Campus of Mercy University in August 2019. There he led efforts to further establish the Bronx Campus as a hub of professional undergraduate and graduate training grounded in the liberal arts.

He was appointed the 7th President of Chestnut Hill College in Philadelphia on July 1, 2022, where he successfully organized its turnaround by developing new nursing programs and streamlining operations.

== Research ==
Latimer has published over 100 papers on neurodevelopmental factors related to infectious disease transmission, treatment engagement and outcome in vulnerable populations. His research has been funded by the National Institutes of Health since 1995, including multiple research project grants, an NIH-funded T-32 Drug Dependence Epidemiology Training Program and a State Department-funded Humphrey Fellowship Program. A primary focus of his research has been an examination of how variations in neuropsychological executive functions in adolescence and adulthood predict an array of health outcomes, including infectious disease transmission, academic achievement, and incarceration. Latimer has conducted studies to prevent infectious disease transmission and promote health in adolescent and adult populations in the US, South Africa, Russia, Mexico, and Puerto Rico.

== Public Health Minute ==
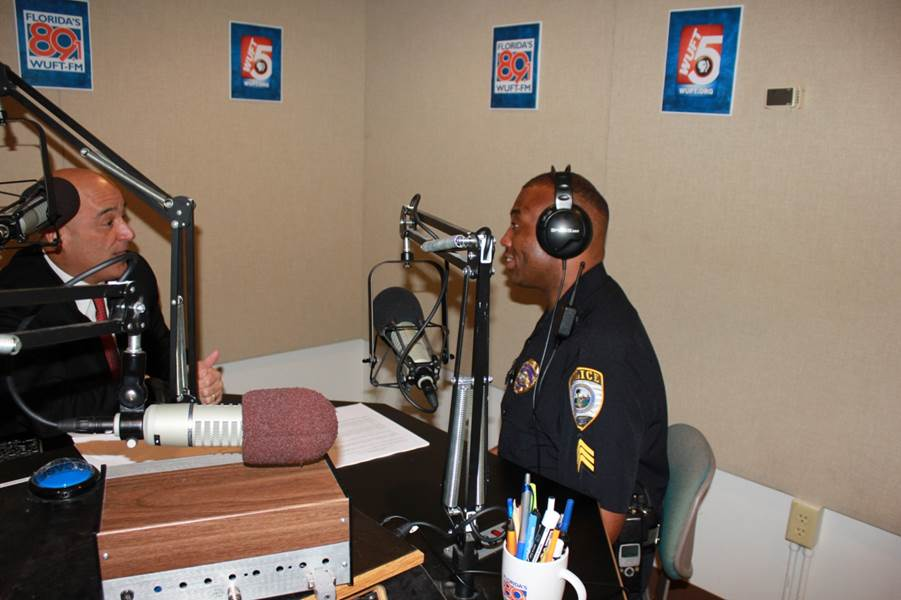
Latimer recording Public Health Minute at the University of Florida, Public Radio member station WUFT, 89.1

In 2013, Latimer founded Public Health Minute a radio show initially broadcast on Public Radio station member, WUFT at the University of Florida. The 60-second radio show is designed to translate current research findings from expert researchers to communities. The show was originally developed based on reports by the Institute of Medicine that evidence-based practices take 17 or more years to reach the public. The radio show provides advice on health-related issues to communities in real-time as research findings are published in scientific, peer-reviewed journals. Public Health Minute reaches 2.5 million listeners nationwide each week airing after Morning Edition and All Things Considered on Public Radio member stations, including WUFT (Gainesville, Florida), WVAS (Montgomery, Alabama), KBFT (Bois Forte Tribal, Minnesota), WDSE-FM (Duluth, Minnesota), WTIP (Grand Marais, Minnesota), KGLT (Bozeman, Montana), KTXK (Texarkana, Texas), WOJB (Reserve, Wisconsin), WMSV (Mississippi State University, Mississippi), and WCBU (Peoria, Illinois).

== Public Health America ==
In 2019, Latimer launched Public Health America, a 30-minute television program in partnership with BronxNet, a public access cable television network in The Bronx airing on multiple Cable Vision and Verizon channels, to celebrate the unparalleled value of a liberal arts education. During the first-half of the program, guests from a wide array of fields across the liberal arts and professional disciplines discuss their work. During the second-half of the program, guests talk about their journeys through higher education by discussing their challenges and triumphs to serve as role models to viewers who might then consider higher education as a path to establish their own vibrant professions. Recent Public Health America segments have included Dr. Anna Bershteyn (NYU), Dr. David Bell (Columbia University), Dr. Glenn Morris (University of Florida, Gainesville), Dr. Marie Smith-East (Duquesne University), and Dr. David Contosta (Chestnut Hill College).

== Select publications ==
- Dunne, E. M., Burrell, L. E., Diggins, A. D., Whitehead, N. E. and Latimer, W. W. (2015), Increased risk for substance use and health-related problems among homeless veterans. American Journal on Addictions, 24, 676–680.
- Trenz, R. C., Dunne, E. M., Zur, J., & Latimer, W. W. (2015). An investigation of school-related variables as risk and protective factors associated with problematic substance use among vulnerable urban adolescents. Vulnerable Children and Youth Studies, 10(2), 131–140.
- Hearn, L. E., Whitehead, N. E., Khan, M. R., & Latimer, W. W. (2014). Time Since Release from Incarceration and HIV Risk Behaviors Among Women: The Potential Protective Role of Committed Partners During Re-entry. AIDS and Behavior, 1–8.
- Keen, L., Khan, M., Clifford, L., Harrell, P. T., & Latimer, W. W. (2014). Injection and non-injection drug use and infectious disease in Baltimore City: Differences by race. Addictive behaviors, 39(9), 1325–1328.26
- Harrell P.T., Trenz R., Scherer M., Martins S., Latimer W. (2013). A latent class approach to treatment readiness corresponds to a transtheoretical ("Stages of Change") model. Journal of Substance Abuse Treatment. [Epub ahead of print].
- Whitaker, D., Graham, C.M., Severtson, S.G., Furr-Holden, C.D. & Latimer, W.W. (2012). Neighborhood & Family Effects on Learning Motivation among Urban African American Middle School Youth. Journal of Child and Family Studies. 21(1):131-138.
- Trenz, R. C., Harrell, P., Scherer, M., Mancha, B., & Latimer, W. (2012). A model of school problems, academic failure, alcohol initiation, and the relationship to adult heroin injection. Substance Use and Misuse. 47(10): 1159–1171.
- Mancha, B.E., Rojas, V.C., & Latimer, W.W. (2012). Alcohol use, alcohol problems, and problem behavior engagement among students at two schools in northern Mexico. Alcohol. 46(7): 695–701.
- Hedden, S.L., Hulbert, A., Cavanaugh, C.E., Parry, C., Moleko, A.G., Latimer, W.W. (2011). Alcohol, drug and sexual risk behavior correlates of recent transactional sex among female black South African drug users. Journal of Substance Use. 16(1), 57–67.
- Severtson, S. G., Mitchell, M. M., Hulbert, A., Latimer, W. (2010). The relationship between performance on the Shipley Institute of Living Scale (SILS) and hepatitis C infection among active injection drug users in Baltimore, Maryland. The American Journal of Drug and Alcohol Abuse. 36(1), 61–65.
- Floyd, L. J., Alexandre, P. K., Hedden, S. L., Lawson, A. L., Giles, N., & Latimer, W. (2010). Adolescent drug dealing and race/ethnicity: A population based study of the differential impact of substance use on involvement in drug trade. The American Journal of Drug and Alcohol Abuse. 36(2), 87–91.23
- Hedden, S., Whitaker, D., Floyd, L., & Latimer, W. (2009, April). Gender differences in the prevalence and behavioral risk factors of HIV in South African drug users. AIDS and Behavior, 13(2), 288–296.
- Severtson, S., & Latimer, W. (2008, April). Factors related to correctional facility incarceration among active injection drug users in Baltimore, MD. Drug and Alcohol Dependence, 94(1), 73–81.
