= Leonard Lief =

American academic (1924–2007)

- Born: June 14, 1924; Manhattan, New York, US
- Died: July 30, 2007 (aged 83); New Rochelle, New York, US
- Occupations: English professor; college president
- Known for: Founding president of Herbert H. Lehman College
- Children: 3

Academic background
- Education: Syracuse University

Academic work
- Discipline: Shakespearean scholar
- Institutions: Hunter College, Herbert H. Lehman College
- Notable works: "American Colloquy" (1963), "Story and Critic" (1963), "Modern Age: Literature" (with James F. Light, 1967)

Leonard Lief (June 14, 1924 – July 30, 2007) was the founding president of Herbert H. Lehman College a Bronx institution that is one of the senior colleges of the City University of New York. Lief was the college's president for more than two decades, from 1968 to 1990, solidifying it as a college with a liberal arts focus on a tree-lined campus.

Leonard Lief was educated at New York University on the G. I. Bill, obtained a master's degree at Columbia University, and a doctorate at Syracuse University in 1953. He became a member of the Hunter College faculty in 1955, and moved to the Bronx campus in 1963 He later became the provost of the Bronx campus, before it was made into Herbert H. Lehman College.

Lief, an Elizabethan scholar, died after a long bout with Parkinson's disease at the age of 83, on July 30, 2007, at his Willow Towers home in New Rochelle, New York. The Lehman College's campus library is named Leonard Lief Library in his honor. His successor as president of Lehman College was Ricardo R. Fernández.

Lief wrote three English textbooks, "American Colloquy" (1963), "Story and Critic" (1963), and "Modern Age: Literature" (1967).

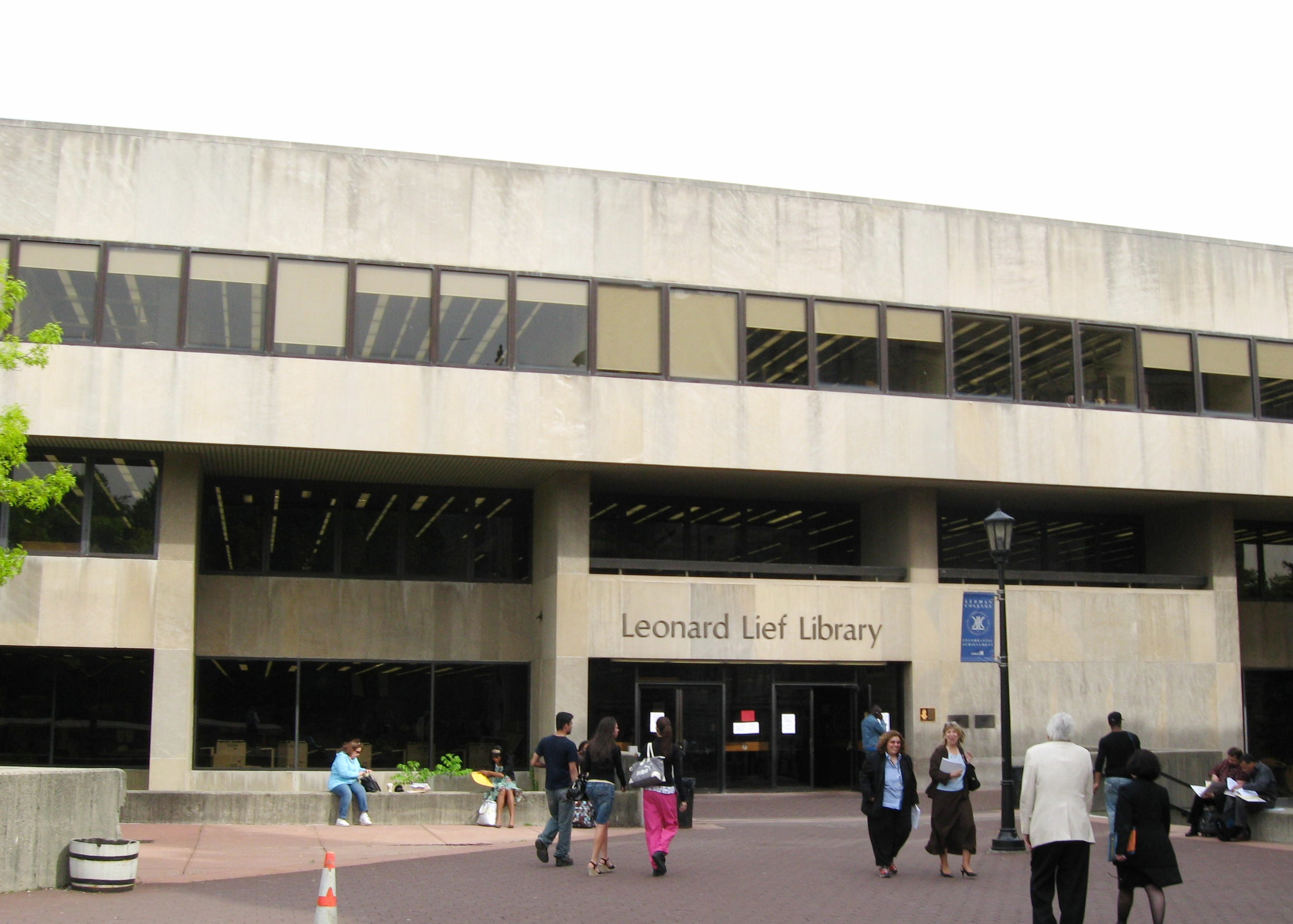
Leonard Lief Library at Herbert H. Lehman College
