= William Thomas Latimer =

- Born: 1842; Ballynahetty, County Tyrone, Ireland
- Died: July 19, 1919 (aged 76–77); Eglish, County Tyrone, Ireland
- Education: Queen's University Belfast
- Occupations: Presbyterian minister, historian, author
- Organisation: Presbyterian Church in Ireland
- Known for: Authoring A History of the Irish Presbyterians (1893)
- Title: Reverend Dr.

William Thomas Latimer (1842 – 19 July 1919) was an Irish Presbyterian minister, antiquarian, and leading historian of the Presbyterian Church in Ireland. He is best known for his foundational academic texts detailing the socio-religious history of Ulster and Irish Presbyterian migrations.

== Early life and education ==
Latimer was born in 1842 in Ballynahetty, County Tyrone, Ireland. He pursued his higher education at Queen's University Belfast, graduating with a Bachelor of Arts. In recognition of his extensive lifelong contributions to Irish ecclesiastical history, he was awarded a Doctor of Divinity (DD) degree in 1915.

== Ecclesiastical and historical career ==
Latimer was ordained into the ministry of the Presbyterian Church in Ireland in 1872 at Eglish, County Tyrone, where he remained for the duration of his pastoral career.

In June 1906, Latimer, alongside Professor J. Heron, became one of the foundational minds behind the establishment of the Presbyterian Historical Society of Ireland, petitioning the General Assembly in Belfast to formally collect, preserve, and index historical church records, regional genealogical transcripts, and portraits.

As an author, his historical works were highly regarded for their meticulous objectivity. His seminal text, A History of the Irish Presbyterians (1893), received high academic praise from the prominent Irish historian W. E. H. Lecky. Latimer wrote widely on local Ulster history, battle analysis, and family migrations, frequently publishing regional accounts in the Belfast Presbyterian weekly newspaper, The Witness.

== Selected bibliography ==
- A History of the Congregation of Eglish (1890)
- A History of the Irish Presbyterians (1893; expanded edition 1902)
- Life of Dr. Cooke (1897)
- Ulster Biographies Relating Chiefly to the Rebellion of 1798 (1897)
- The Battles of the Yellow Ford and Benburb (1919)

== Death and legacy ==
Latimer died on 19 July 1919 in County Tyrone. His extensive research notebooks, personal diaries, newspaper clippings, and transcribed 17th- and 18th-century church records are preserved as a core archival collection within the Special Collections department at the Queen's University Belfast Library.
